= 1995 Men's British Open Squash Championship =

1995 sporting competition

British Open Squash Championships
- 57th British Open Championships

Details
- Location: Cardiff, Wales
- Venue: Cardiff International Arena
- Dates: 19–26 March 1995

The 1995 Leekes British Open Championships was held at the Cardiff International Arena from 19–26 March 1995.
Jansher Khan won his fourth consecutive title defeating Peter Marshall in the final.

== Seeds ==
1. (Pakistan) Jansher Khan
2. (England) Peter Marshall
3. (Australia) Rodney Eyles
4. (Australia) Brett Martin
5. (Scotland) Peter Nicol
6. (England) Chris Walker
7. (England) Simon Parke
8. (England) Mark Chaloner
9. (England) Del Harris
10. (New Zealand) Ross Norman
11. (Australia) Anthony Hill
12. (Pakistan) Zarak Jahan Khan
13. (Finland) Sami Elopuro
14. (England) Danny Meddings
15. (England) Jason Nicolle
16. (England) Mark Cairns

== Draw and results ==
=== Final Qualifying round ===
Player One	Player Two	Score
(Republic of Ireland) Derek Ryan	(South Africa) Craig Wapnick	15-9 15-8 7-15 16-17 15-7
(France) Julien Bonetat	(Australia) Byron Davis	15-7 15-12 15-3
(England) Mark Chaloner	(England) Tim Garner	15-9 15-7 15-8
(Scotland) Martin Heath	(Belgium) Stefan Casteleyn	14-15 15-11 15-13 15-6
(England) Nick Taylor	(Hong Kong) Faheem Khan	15-11 17-15 15-13
(Egypt) Ahmed Barada	(New Zealand) Glen Wilson	15-6 15-4 12-15 15-12
(England) Angus Kirkland	(Netherlands) Lucas Buit	15-5 15-8 15-7

=== Main draw ===
First round
1	(Pakistan) Jansher Khan	15	15	15
(England) Angus Kirkland	5	8	13
10	(New Zealand) Ross Norman	15	15	7	9	15
(Egypt) Ahmed Barada	5	10	15	15	5
11	(Australia) Anthony Hill	15	15	15
(England) Nick Taylor	12	7	1
6	(England) Chris Walker	17	16	15	15
(England) Paul Gregory	14	17	11	12
3	(Australia) Rodney Eyles	15	13	15	15
(Germany) Hansi Wiens	12	15	13	5
(Egypt) Amir Wagih	11	15	15	17
15	(England) Jason Nicolle	15	9	7	16
(France) Julien Bonetat	15	3	17	15
5	(Scotland) Peter Nicol	14	15	15	8
12	(Pakistan) Zarak Jahan Khan	8	15	15	15
(England) Paul Johnson	15	5	11	10
2	(England) Peter Marshall	15	15	15
(New Zealand) Paul Steel	10	7	8
16	(England) Mark Cairns	15	15	15
(Republic of Ireland) Derek Ryan	6	12	11
(England) Stephen Meads	15	12	15	15
8	(England) Mark Chaloner	11	15	8	11
14	(England) Danny Meddings	15	15	6	15
(Wales) Adrian Davies	14	7	15	11
4	(Australia) Brett Martin	17	12	15	15
(Australia) Craig Rowland	16	15	7	10
9	(England) Del Harris	15	15	15
(Scotland) Martin Heath	13	13	9
(England) Phil Whitlock	15	15	15
13	(Finland) Sami Elopuro	12	13	11
7	(England) Simon Parke	15	11	17	17
(England) Tony Hands	10	15	16	15

Second round
1	(Pakistan) Jansher K	15	15	15
10	(New Zealand) Norman	6	8	4
11	(Australia) Hill	15	15	17
6	(England) Walker	7	11	14
3	(Australia) Eyles	15	15	15
(Egypt) Wagih	10	11	10
(France) Bonetat	12	15	15	11	15
12	(Pakistan) Z J Khan	15	14	8	15	10
2	(England) Marshall	15	15	4	15
16	(England) Cairns	10	13	15	4
(England) Meads	15	16	15	15
14	(England) Meddings	9	17	9	10
4	(Australia) B Martin	14	15	15	14	15
9	(England) Harris	15	13	9	15	9
(England) Whitlock	15	15	5	15
7	(England) Parke	7	12	15	11

Quarter-finals
1	(Pakistan) Jansher K	15	12	15	15
11	(Australia) Hill	7	15	6	8
3	(Australia) Eyles	15	15	11	15
(France) Bonetat	7	10	15	7
2	(England) Marshall	15	15	12	15
(England) Meads	7	7	15	4
4	(Australia) B Martin	17	13	15	15
(England) Whitlock	14	15	10	10

Semi-finals
1	(Pakistan) Jansher K	12	15	15	15
3	(Australia) Eyles	15	9	12	7
Final
1	(Pakistan) Jansher K	15	15	15
2	(England) Marshall	4	4	5
2	(England) Marshall	15	15	6	15
4	(Australia) B Martin	7	7	15	12

Preceded by 1994	British Open Squash Championships; Wales (Cardiff); 1995	Succeeded by 1996
