= 1998 Men's British Open Squash Championship =

British Open Squash Championships
- 60th British Open Championships

Details
- Location: Birmingham, England
- Venue: National Indoor Arena
- Dates: 27 March – 5 April 1998

The 1998 British Open Championships was held at the National Indoor Arena in Birmingham, from 27 March – 5 April 1998.
Peter Nicol won the title defeating Jansher Khan in the final. This win put an end to Khan's six year winning streak.

== Seeds ==
1. (Scotland) Peter Nicol
2. (Pakistan) Jansher Khan
3. (Canada) Jonathon Power
4. (Australia) Rodney Eyles
5. (Egypt) Ahmed Barada
6. (Wales) Alex Gough
7. (England) Simon Parke
8. (Australia) Anthony Hill
9. (England) Mark Chaloner
10. (Australia) Dan Jenson
11. (England) Del Harris
12. (England) Paul Johnson
13. (England) Chris Walker
14. (Australia) Byron Davis
15. (Scotland) Martin Heath
16. (England) Mark Cairns

== Draw and results ==
=== Final Qualifying round ===
Player One	Player Two	Score
(Finland) Juha Raumolin	(Australia) John Williams	9-15 15-7 7-15 15-9 15-12
(Australia) Joseph Kneipp	(England) Danny Meddings	9-15 15-11 15-7 15-2
(Wales) David Evans	(Australia) Stewart Boswell	15-9 8-15 15-5 15-10
(Australia) David Palmer	(Malaysia) Ong Beng Hee	15-5 15-14 15-4
(England) Nick Taylor	(England) Bradley Ball	15-13 13-15 15-10 15-11
(England) Lee Beachill	(South Africa) Glenn Whittaker	15-12 15-11 9-15 15-7
(Scotland) John White	(Finland) Mika Monto +	15-10 15-14 13-15 15-10
(South Africa) Rodney Durbach	(England) Iain Higgins	15-9 15-10 7-15 15-4

+ Lucky loser

=== Main draw ===
First round
1	(Scotland) Peter Nicol	15	15	15
(England) Lee Beachill	2	10	10
13	(England) Chris Walker	15	13	15	17
(Republic of Ireland) Derek Ryan	8	15	10	15
7	(England) Simon Parke	15	13	15	15
(Finland) Juha Raumolin	12	9	15	9
9	(England) Mark Chaloner	17	15	15
(France) Julien Bonetat	16	7	12
4	(Australia) Rodney Eyles	15	15	15
(Egypt) Amr Shabana	6	10	7
16	(England) Mark Cairns	15	15	15
(Egypt) Amir Wagih	13	8	10
(Scotland) John White	15	15	15
15	(Scotland) Martin Heath	12	13	10
(Australia) Joseph Kneipp	15	15	9	13	15
6	(Wales) Alex Gough	13	6	15	15	14
2	(Pakistan) Jansher Khan	17	3	17	5	15
(Belgium) Stefan Casteleyn	15	15	15	15	6
14	(Australia) Byron Davis	15	15	15
(South Africa) Rodney Durbach	12	12	10
12	(England) Paul Johnson	15	13	15	15
(Finland) Mika Monto	10	15	9	13
8	(Australia) Anthony Hill	15	17	15
(Australia) David Palmer	11	14	8
10	(Australia) Dan Jenson	15	15	9	17
(England) Nick Taylor	8	7	15	14
(Canada) Graham Ryding	16	15	15	15
5	(Egypt) Ahmed Barada	17	6	7	3
(Wales) David Evans	9	15	15	15
11	(England) Del Harris	15	11	7	9
3	(Canada) Jonathon Power	15	15	15
(England) Tony Hands	14	14	7

Second round
1	(Scotland) Nicol	15	15	15
13	(England) Walker	12	7	9
7	(England) Parke	13	8	15	15	15
9	(England) Chaloner	15	15	12	7	11
4	(Australia) Eyles	7	15	15	7	15
16	(England) Cairns	15	11	11	15	10
(Scotland) White	15	15	7	13	15
(Australia) Kneipp	13	9	15	15	8
2	(Pakistan) Jansher K	15	15	15
14	(Australia) Davis	12	13	11
12	(England) Johnson	15	9	15	15
8	(Australia) Hill	12	15	10	6
10	(Australia) Jenson	10	10	15	15	15
(Canada) Ryding	15	15	11	14	2
(Wales) Evans	9	15	6	w/o
3	(Canada) Power	15	17	3	ret

Quarter-finals
1	(Scotland) Nicol	15	15	15
7	(England) Parke	13	13	6
4	(Australia) Eyles	17	17	15
(Scotland) White	16	16	12
2	(Pakistan) Jansher K	15	15	17
12	(England) Johnson	11	11	15
10	(Australia) Jenson	9	15	15	15
(Wales) Evans	15	11	6	8

Semi-finals
1	(Scotland) Nicol	15	15	15
4	(Australia) Eyles	9	13	11
Final
1	(Scotland) Nicol	17	15	15
2	(Pakistan) Jansher K	16	14	5
2	(Pakistan) Jansher K	15	15	10	15
10	(Australia) Jenson	9	8	15	10

Preceded by 1997	British Open Squash Championships; England (Birmingham); 1998	Succeeded by 1999
