= 1999 Men's World Open Squash Championship =

Men's World Open 1999
- 23rd PSA World Squash Championship
- Location: Giza, Cairo, Egypt
- Date: September 10–17, 1999
- Website www.squashtalk.com/html/news/worldopen1.htm

PSA World Tour
- Category: PSA World Open
- Prize money: $ 170,000

Results
- Champion: (Scotland) Peter Nicol
- Runner-up: (Egypt) Ahmed Barada
- Semi-finalists: (Canada) Jonathon Power (Scotland) Martin Heath

The 1999 PSA Men's World Open Squash Championship is the men's edition of the 1999 World Open, which serves as the individual world championship for squash players. The event took place in Giza, Cairo in Egypt from 10 September to 17 September 1999. Peter Nicol won his first World Open title, defeating Ahmed Barada in the final.

== Seeds ==
1. (Canada) Jonathon Power (semifinals)
2. (Scotland) Peter Nicol (champion)
3. (Egypt) Ahmed Barada (final)
4. (England) Paul Johnson (quarterfinals)
5. (Scotland) Martin Heath (semifinals)
6. (England) Simon Parke (quarterfinals)
7. (Republic of Ireland) Derek Ryan (second round)
8. (Australia) Anthony Hill (quarterfinals)
9. (Belgium) Stefan Casteleyn (second round)
10. (Wales) Alex Gough (first round)
11. (Australia) Dan Jenson (third round)
12. (Australia) Rodney Eyles (first round)
13. (Pakistan) Amjad Khan (third round)
14. (Canada) Graham Ryding (first round)
15. (Australia) Paul Price (third round)
16. (Scotland) John White (second round)

== Draw and results ==
=== Finals ===
Quarter finals
1	(Canada) Jonathon Power	15	9	15	15
6	(England) Simon Parke	8	15	7	12
4	(Australia) Anthony Hill	5	14	8
3	(Egypt) Ahmed Barada	15	17	15
4	(England) Paul Johnson	13	6	13
5	(Scotland) Martin Heath	15	15	15
(England) Mark Chaloner	17	8	6	12
2	(Scotland) Peter Nicol	14	15	15	15

Semi finals
1	(Canada) Power	15	9	2	rtd
3	(Egypt) Barada	9	15	9
5	(Scotland) Heath	15	13	9	12
2	(Scotland) Nicol	11	15	15	15

Final
3	(Egypt) Barada	9	13	11
2	(Scotland) Nicol	15	15	15

=== Top half ===
==== Section 1 ====
First round
1	(Canada) Jonathon Power	15	15	9	17
(Pakistan) Zarak Jahan Khan	9	14	15	14
(Finland) Juha Raumolin	15	14	15	14	9
Q	(South Africa) Glenn Whittaker	10	15	9	15	15
(England) Nick Taylor	15	15	15
(Finland) Janne Kyttanen	3	11	5
(Egypt) Amr Shabana	15	13	15	15
12	(Australia) Rodney Eyles	9	15	8	13
13	(Pakistan) Amjad Khan	15	11	15	13	15
Q	(Egypt) Mohamed Essam Hafiz	5	15	3	15	9
(France) Thierry Lincou	13	15	15	15
Q	(England) John Russell	15	8	12	9
(England) Stephen Meads	11	15	15	2	3
(England) Marcus Berrett	15	11	13	15	15
(Australia) Joseph Kneipp	8	10	9
6	(England) Simon Parke	15	15	15

Second round
1	(Canada) Power	15	15	15
Q	(South Africa) Whittaker	8	13	13
(England) Taylor	13	9	13
(Egypt) Shabana	15	15	15
13	(Pakistan) A Khan	15	15	15
(France) Lincou	13	11	5
(England) Berrett	14	11	9
6	(England) Parke	15	15	15

Third round
1	(Canada) Power	15	17	15
(Egypt) Shabana	13	14	8
13	(Pakistan) Khan	15	4	6	5
6	(England) Parke	11	15	15	15

Quarter finals
1	(Canada) Power	15	9	15	15
6	(England) Parke	8	15	7	12

==== Section 2 ====
First round
8	(Australia) Anthony Hill	15	17	15
(Egypt) Amir Wagih	5	16	13
(Australia) Byron Davis	15	12	9	15	15
(Egypt) Ahmed Faizy	6	15	15	11	5
(Australia) David Palmer	15	15	15
(Italy) Davide Bianchetti	6	10	6
(Australia) John Williams	12	15	15	8	15
10	(Wales) Alex Gough	15	7	5	15	12
14	(Canada) Graham Ryding	15	10	15	9	8
(Pakistan) Shamsul Islam Khan	12	15	11	15	15
Q	(Pakistan) Mansoor Zaman	7	15	15	13	11
(Egypt) Omar El Borolossy	15	12	10	15	15
(England) Tony Hands	15	15	15
Q	(England) Bradley Ball	10	5	10
(Sweden) Daniel Forslund	6	8	7
3	(Egypt) Ahmed Barada	15	15	15

Second round
8	(Australia) Hill	15	15	15
(Australia) Davis	8	4	11
(Australia) Palmer	15	15	15
(Australia) Williams	14	13	6
(Pakistan) S I Khan	5	7	9
(Egypt) El Borolossy	15	15	15
(England) Hands	10	3	7
3	(Egypt) Barada	15	15	15

Third round
8	(Australia) Hill	11	15	15	12	15
(Australia) Palmer	15	10	12	15	6
(Egypt) El Borolossy	10	8	10
3	(Egypt) Barada	15	15	15

Quarter finals
8	(Australia) Hill	5	14	8
3	(Egypt) Barada	15	17	15

=== Bottom half ===
==== Section 1 ====
First round
4	(England) Paul Johnson	15	15	15
(Finland) Mika Monto	10	9	13
(England) Mark Cairns	15	15	15
(Finland) Olli Tuominen	11	12	8
(England) Tim Garner	15	15	15
(Pakistan) Kashif Shuja	10	7	8
(Pakistan) Mir Zaman Gul	11	16	13
11	(Australia) Dan Jenson	15	17	15
9	(Belgium) Stefan Casteleyn	15	15	15
(Canada) Kelly Patrick	13	13	12
(Egypt) Mohd Medhat Morsi	17	4	9	9
(Wales) David Evans	14	15	15	15
Q	(Egypt) Karim Darwish	15	15	15
(Australia) Stewart Boswell	11	7	9
(France) Julien Bonetat	13	11	7
5	(Scotland) Martin Heath	15	15	15

Second round
4	(England) Johnson	11	6	15	15	15
(England) Cairns	15	15	7	8	5
(England) Garner	15	6	15	14	9
11	(Australia) Jenson	10	15	10	15	15
9	(Belgium) Casteleyn	6	8	4
(Wales) Evans	15	15	15
Q	(Egypt) Darwish	15	10	3	4
5	(Scotland) Heath	12	15	15	15

Third round
4	(England) Johnson	15	14	15	17
11	(Australia) Jenson	11	17	8	16
(Wales) Evans	17	6	9	15	9
5	(Scotland) Heath	16	15	15	7	15

Quarter finals
4	(England) Johnson	13	6	13
5	(Scotland) Heath	15	15	15

==== Section 2 ====
First round
7	(Republic of Ireland) Derek Ryan	15	17	15
(Australia) Billy Haddrell	6	16	12
Q	(Malaysia) Kenneth Low	6	3	10
(Australia) Craig Rowland	15	15	15
(England) Mark Chaloner	15	15	15
(France) Renan Lavigne	8	12	9
(England) Julian Wellings	6	14	7
16	(Scotland) John White	15	17	15
15	(Australia) Paul Price	15	15	15
(Hong Kong) Abdul Faheem Khan	12	10	7
(England) Del Harris	6	14	8
(Australia) Anthony Ricketts	15	15	15
(South Africa) Rodney Durbach	12	15	15	12	15
(England) Chris Walker	15	13	10	15	10
(England) Lee Beachill	6	7	9
2	(Scotland) Peter Nicol	15	15	15

Second round
7	(Republic of Ireland) Ryan	15	10	11	10
(Australia) Rowland	4	15	15	15
(England) Chaloner	6	15	15	6	15
16	(Scotland) White	15	9	11	15	10
15	(Australia) Price	13	15	12	15	15
(Australia) Ricketts	15	9	15	10	8
(South Africa) Durbach	9	7	9
2	(Scotland) Nicol	15	15	15

Third round
(Australia) Rowland	16	15	3	15	9
(England) Chaloner	17	13	15	6	15
15	(Australia) Price	12	10	13
2	(Scotland) Nicol	15	15	15

Quarter finals
(England) Chaloner	17	8	6	12
2	(Scotland) Nicol	14	15	15	15

== See also ==
- PSA World Open
- 1999 Women's World Open Squash Championship

Preceded by Qatar (Doha); 1998	PSA World Open; Egypt (Cairo); 1999	Succeeded by Antwerp (Belgium); 2002
