= 1997 Men's British Open Squash Championship =

1997 men's sporting competition

British Open Squash Championships
- 59th British Open Championships

Details
- Location: Cardiff, Wales
- Venue: Wales National Ice Rink
- Dates: 31 March – 6 April 1997

The 1997 British Open Championships was held at the Welsh Institute of Sport with the later stages being held at the Wales National Ice Rink in Cardiff from 31 March – 6 April 1997.
Jansher Khan won his sixth consecutive title defeating Peter Nicol in the final.
Paul Gregory represented Greece from 1997.

== Seeds ==
1. (Pakistan) Jansher Khan
2. (Australia) Rodney Eyles
3. (Scotland) Peter Nicol
4. (England) Simon Parke
5. (England) Chris Walker
6. (Canada) Jonathon Power
7. (Egypt) Ahmed Barada
8. (Australia) Brett Martin
9. (England) Del Harris
10. (Pakistan) Zubair Jahan Khan
11. (Australia) Anthony Hill
12. (England) Mark Chaloner
13. (England) Mark Cairns
14. (England) Jason Nicolle
15. (Greece) Paul Gregory
16. (France) Julien Bonetat

=== Main draw ===
First round
1	(Pakistan) Jansher Khan	15	15	15
(Republic of Ireland) Derek Ryan	7	6	9
(Australia) Joseph Kneipp	15	15	15
15	(Greece) Paul Gregory	12	11	7
5	(England) Chris Walker	w/o
(Scotland) Martin Heath	scr
(Wales) David Evans	15	15	15
14	(England) Jason Nicolle	4	7	3
7	(Egypt) Ahmed Barada	15	7	15	4	15
(Egypt) Omar El Borolossy	6	15	12	15	8
(England) Stephen Meads	15	15	5	w/o
10	(Pakistan) Zubair Jahan Khan	9	9	3	ret
(Australia) Dan Jenson	15	15	15
4	(England) Simon Parke	7	10	13
9	(England) Del Harris	15	13	15	15
(Pakistan) Zarak Jahan Khan	8	15	8	5
2	(Australia) Rodney Eyles	17	15	14	15
(England) Nick Taylor	16	10	15	9
12	(England) Mark Chaloner	15	15	15
(Australia) Anthony Ricketts	7	5	7
6	(Canada) Jonathon Power	2	15	15	3	15
(England) Danny Meddings	10	5	2
16	(France) Julien Bonetat	10	15	15	15
(South Africa) Craig Wapnick	15	12	5	10
3	(Scotland) Peter Nicol	7	15	15	15	15
(England) Paul Johnson	15	17	14	7	6
11	(Australia) Anthony Hill	17	14	15	13	15
(Sweden) Anders Thorén	15	17	11	15	12
8	(Australia) Brett Martin	15	15	12	12	15
(England) Peter Marshall	12	8	9
13	(England) Mark Cairns	15	15	15
(Australia) David Palmer	12	10	14

Second round
1	(Pakistan) Jansher K	15	15	15
(Australia) Kneipp	9	8	9
5	(England) Walker	13	12	15	15	15
(Wales) Evans	15	15	9	6	12
7	(Egypt) Barada	15	15	15
(England) Meads	9	9	9
(Australia) Jenson	15	12	10	15	17
9	(England) Harris	5	15	15	14	14
2	(Australia) Eyles	15	11	15	15
12	(England) Chaloner	13	15	8	9
6	(Canada) Power	15	15	15
16	(France) Bonetat	3	2	12
3	(Scotland) Nicol	15	10	15	15
11	(Australia) Hill	5	15	8	12
8	(Australia) B Martin	15	9	15	15
13	(England) Cairns	7	15	9	11

Quarter-finals
1	(Pakistan) Jansher K	15	15	15
5	(England) Walker	5	9	12
7	(Egypt) Barada	14	12	15	15	15
(Australia) Jenson	15	15	13	10	12
2	(Australia) Eyles	15	5	9	15	15
6	(Canada) Power	13	15	15	12	11
3	(Scotland) Nicol	15	15	13	15
8	(Australia) B Martin	10	11	15	12

Semi-finals
1	(Pakistan) Jansher K	13	15	15	15
7	(Egypt) Barada	15	8	8	4
Final
1	(Pakistan) Jansher K	17	9	15	8	15
3	(Scotland) Nicol	15	15	12	15	8
2	(Australia) Eyles	15	12	14	2
3	(Scotland) Nicol	5	15	17	15

Preceded by 1996	British Open Squash Championships; Wales (Cardiff); 1997	Succeeded by 1998
