= 1994 Men's British Open Squash Championship =

British Open Squash Championships
- 56th British Open Championships

Details
- Location: London, England
- Venue: Lambs Squash Club and Wembley Conference Centre
- Dates: 3–11 April 1994

The 1994 Hi-Tec British Open Championships was held at the Lambs Squash Club with the later stages being held at the Wembley Conference Centre from 3–11 April 1994.
Jansher Khan won his third consecutive title defeating Brett Martin in the final.

== Seeds ==
1. (Pakistan) Jansher Khan
2. (Australia) Brett Martin
3. (Australia) Rodney Martin
4. (England) Peter Marshall
5. (Australia) Rodney Eyles
6. (New Zealand) Ross Norman
7. (England) Chris Walker
8. (Pakistan) Zarak Jahan Khan
9. (England) Phil Whitlock
10. (England) Tony Hands
11. (Scotland) Peter Nicol
12. (Finland) Sami Elopuro
13. (England) Simon Parke
14. (Germany) Hansi Wiens
15. (England) Danny Meddings
16. (Australia) Anthony Hill

== Draw and results ==
=== Final Qualifying round ===
Player One	Player Two	Score
(England) Clive Leach	(Egypt) Amir Wagih	9-5 4-9 9-7 9-0
(Australia) Adam Schreiber	(Australia) John White	5-9 9-3 9-5 9-2
(France) Julien Bonetat	(Wales) Adrian Davies	9-6 9-7 9-7
(England) Del Harris	(South Africa) Craig Wapnick	9-7 10-8 9-4
(Canada) Gary Waite	(Wales) Alex Gough	3-9 9-4 9-5 9-4
(England) Jason Nicolle	(New Zealand) Paul Steel	9-6 9-3 9-5
(Australia) Craig Rowland	(England) Darren Webb	8-10 0-6 0-6 7-0 ret
(England) Angus Kirkland	(Egypt) Ahmed Barada	9-5 9-7 9-0

=== Main draw ===
First round
1	(Pakistan) Jansher Khan	9	9	9
(England) Angus Kirkland	3	4	1
(England) Jason Nicolle	9	9	9
10	(England) Tony Hands	6	5	6
5	(Australia) Rodney Eyles	9	4	9	9
(Canada) Gary Waite	3	9	7	7
14	(Germany) Hansi Wiens	6	9	8	9	9
(England) Clive Leach	9	5	9	3	1
4	(England) Peter Marshall	9	9	9
(England) Stephen Meads	1	2	5
(England) Del Harris	9	9	9
15	(England) Danny Meddings	2	5	3
16	(Australia) Anthony Hill	9	3	3	9	7
(Pakistan) Mir Zaman Gul +	4	9	9	2	0
6	(New Zealand) Ross Norman	9	9	9
(England) Paul Johnson	7	0	4
2	(Australia) Brett Martin	2	7	9	9	9
(Republic of Ireland) Derek Ryan	9	9	6	2	0
9	(England) Phil Whitlock	9	9	9
(Australia) Adam Schreiber	7	4	3
8	(Pakistan) Zarak Jahan Khan	9	7	6	9	9
(South Africa) Craig van der Wath	6	9	9	4	5
(France) Julien Bonetat	2	2	9	9	9
13	(England) Simon Parke	9	9	7	5	5
7	(England) Chris Walker	8	9	9	3	9
(Hong Kong) Abdul Faheem	10	3	3	9	67
(Australia) Craig Rowland	7	9	3	9	9
11	(Scotland) Peter Nicol	9	5	9	7	0
(England) Mark Cairns	3	9	9	5	10
3	(Australia) Rodney Martin	9	5	0	9	8
12	(Finland) Sami Elopuro	9	9	9
(Australia) Mark Carlyon	4	4	2

Second round
1	(Pakistan) Jansher K	9	9	9
(England) Nicolle	5	0	0
5	(New Zealand) Eyles	9	9	9
14	(Germany) Wiens	3	4	3
4	(England) Marshall	9	9	9
(England) Harris	0	6	6
16	(Australia) Hill	9	9	9
6	(New Zealand) Norman	2	2	3
2	(Australia) B Martin	9	8	9	9
9	(England) Whitlock	3	10	2	7
8	(Pakistan) Z J Khan	9	9	9
(France) Bonetat	3	5	5
7	(England) Walker	9	10	9
(Australia) Rowland	5	8	5
(England) Cairns	9	6	9	9
12	(Finland) Elopuro	2	9	5	6

Quarter-finals
1	(Pakistan) Jansher K	9	9	9
5	(Australia) Eyles	2	4	3
4	(England) Marshall	9	9	9
16	(Australia) Hill	1	1	3
2	(Australia) B Martin	9	9	9
8	(Pakistan) Z J Khan	3	5	0
7	(England) Walker	9	4	9	9
(England) Cairns	7	9	3	2

Semi-finals
1	(Pakistan) Jansher K	9	7	9	9
4	(England) Marshall	2	9	4	3
Final
1	(Pakistan) Jansher K	9	9	9	9
2	(Australia) B Martin	1	0	10	1
2	(Australia) Martin B	9	7	9	9
7	(England) Walker	7	9	7	4

+ In the first round Mir Zaman Gul was disqualified for butting Anthony Hill after the match got out of hand.

Preceded by 1993	British Open Squash Championships; England (London); 1994	Succeeded by 1995
