= 1996 Men's World Open Squash Championship =

Men's World Open 1996
- 20th PSA World Squash Championship
- Location: Lahore, Pakistan
- Date: November 16–22, 1996

PSA World Tour
- Category: PSA World Open
- Prize money: $ 130,000

Results
- Champion: (Pakistan) Jansher Khan
- Runner-up: (Australia) Rodney Eyles
- Semi-finalists: (Scotland) Peter Nicol (England) Chris Walker

The 1996 PSA Men's World Open Squash Championship is the men's edition of the 1996 World Open, which serves as the individual world championship for squash players. The event took place in Lahore in Pakistan from 16 November to 22 November 1996. Jansher Khan won his eight World Open title, defeating Rodney Eyles in the final.

== Seeds ==
1. (Pakistan) Jansher Khan (champion)
2. (Australia) Rodney Eyles (final)
3. (Australia) Brett Martin (quarterfinals)
4. (Scotland) Peter Nicol (semifinals)
5. (England) Chris Walker (semifinals)
6. (England) Del Harris (second round)
7. (England) Simon Parke (quarterfinals)
8. (England) Mark Chaloner (first round)

== Draw and results ==
Quarter finals
1 | (Pakistan) Jansher Khan | 15 | 15 | 15
7 | (England) Simon Parke | 3 | 4 | 8
(Australia) Craig Rowland | 13 | 6 | 9
4 | (Scotland) Peter Nicol | 15 | 15 | 15
5 | (England) Chris Walker | 15 | 12 | 15 | 15
3 | (Australia) Brett Martin | 10 | 15 | 9 | 13
(Pakistan) Zubair Jahan Khan | 17 | 15 | 15 | 7 | 6
2 | (Australia) Rodney Eyles | 15 | 13 | 17 | 15 | 15

Semi finals
1 | (Pakistan) Jansher Khan | 15 | 15 | 15
4 | (Scotland) Peter Nicol | 9 | 9 | 8
5 | (England) Chris Walker | 12 | 7 | 15 | 15 | 14
2 | (Australia) Rodney Eyles | 15 | 15 | 14 | 4 | 15

Final
1 | (Pakistan) Jansher Khan | 15 | 17 | 11 | 15
2 | (Australia) Rodney Eyles | 13 | 15 | 15 | 3

=== Top half ===
First round
1 | (Pakistan) Jansher Khan | 15 | 15 | 15
(South Africa) Craig Wapnick | 8 | 10 | 6
(Canada) Jonathon Power | 15 | 15 | 17
(England) Danny Meddings | 8 | 9 | 16
7 | (England) Simon Parke | 15 | 15 | 15
(Wales) David Evans | 11 | 7 | 13
(France) Julien Bonetat | 15 | 13 | 13 | 15 | 15
(Greece) Paul Gregory | 9 | 15 | 15 | 11 | 13
4 | (Scotland) Peter Nicol | 15 | 15 | 13 | 15
(Finland) Juha Raumolin | 8 | 14 | 15 | 12
(Egypt) Ahmed Barada | 15 | 16 | 15 | 15
(Scotland) Martin Heath | 11 | 17 | 12 | 12
(Australia) Craig Rowland | 15 | 15 | 15
(Wales) Alex Gough | 5 | 11 | 11
6 | (England) Del Harris | 16 | 15 | 14 | 12 | 15
(Australia) Dan Jenson | 15 | 13 | 15 | 15 | 14

Second round
1 | (Pakistan) Jansher Khan | 12 | 11 | 11
(Canada) Jonathon Power | 13 | 13 | 4
7 | (England) Simon Parke | 15 | 12 | 15 | 17
(France) Julien Bonetat | 12 | 15 | 10 | 16
4 | (Scotland) Peter Nicol | 12 | 15 | 9 | 15 | 15
(Egypt) Ahmed Barada | 15 | 2 | 15 | 9 | 13
(Australia) Craig Rowland | 15 | 15 | 15
6 | (England) Del Harris | 14 | 13 | 7

Quarter finals
1 | (Pakistan) Jansher Khan | 15 | 15 | 15
7 | (England) Simon Parke | 3 | 4 | 8
4 | (Scotland) Peter Nicol | 15 | 15 | 15
(Australia) Craig Rowland | 13 | 6 | 9

Semi finals
1 | (Pakistan) Jansher Khan | 15 | 15 | 15
4 | (Scotland) Peter Nicol | 9 | 9 | 8

=== Bottom half ===
First round
2 | (Australia) Rodney Eyles | 15 | 15 | 15
(Republic of Ireland) Derek Ryan | 10 | 12 | 10
(England) Mark Cairns | 14 | 15 | 15 | 15
(England) Stephen Meads | 15 | 6 | 8 | 8
8 | (England) Mark Chaloner | 12 | 15 | 6 | 6
(Pakistan) Zubair Jahan Khan | 15 | 7 | 15 | 15
(Australia) Anthony Hill | 15 | 15 | 9 | 15
(England) Paul Johnson | 7 | 11 | 15 | 6
5 | (England) Chris Walker | 15 | 15 | 15
(Australia) Joseph Kneipp | 14 | 11 | 8
(Pakistan) Zarak Jahan Khan | 15 | 13 | 15 | 8 | 15
(England) Jason Nicolle | 7 | 15 | 12 | 15 | 5
3 | (Australia) Brett Martin | 15 | 15 | 15
(Australia) Byron Davis | 8 | 13 | 9
(Germany) Simon Frenz | 15 | 9 | 17 | 15
(England) Tony Hands | 10 | 15 | 15 | 7

Second round
2 | (Australia) Rodney Eyles | 10 | 15 | 15 | 15
(England) Mark Cairns | 15 | 11 | 10 | 8
(Pakistan) Zubair Jahan Khan | 15 | 10 | 15 | 13 | 15
(Australia) Anthony Hill | 8 | 15 | 4 | 15 | 12
5 | (England) Chris Walker | 15 | 15 | 15
(Pakistan) Zarak Jahan Khan | 6 | 12 | 11
3 | (Australia) Brett Martin | 15 | 15 | 15
(Germany) Simon Frenz | 12 | 9 | 13

Quarter finals
2 | (Australia) Rodney Eyles | 15 | 13 | 17 | 15 | 15
(Pakistan) Zubair Jahan Khan | 17 | 15 | 15 | 7 | 6
5 | (England) Chris Walker | 15 | 12 | 15 | 15
3 | (Australia) Brett Martin | 10 | 15 | 9 | 13

Semi finals
2 | (Australia) Rodney Eyles | 5 | 11 | 9 | 11 | 11
5 | (England) Chris Walker | 11 | 5 | 11 | 4 | 5

== See also ==
- PSA World Open
- 1996 Women's World Open Squash Championship

| Preceded by Cyprus (Nicosia); 1995 | PSA World Open; Pakistan (Lahore); 1996 | Succeeded by Malaysia (Petaling Jaya); 1997 |
