= 1996 Men's British Open Squash Championship =

1996 men's sporting competition

British Open Squash Championships
- 58th British Open Championships

Details
- Location: Cardiff, Wales
- Venue: Cardiff International Arena
- Dates: 1–7 April 1996

The 1996 Leekes British Open Championships was held at the Cardiff International Arena from 1–7 April 1996.
Jansher Khan won his fifth consecutive title defeating Rodney Eyles in the final.
The PSA decided there would only be eight seeds during this event.

== Seeds ==
1. (Pakistan) Jansher Khan
2. (Australia) Rodney Eyles
3. (Australia) Brett Martin
4. (Scotland) Peter Nicol
5. (England) Del Harris
6. (England) Chris Walker
7. (Australia) Anthony Hill
8. (England) Mark Chaloner

== Draw and results ==
=== Main draw ===
First round
1 | (Pakistan) Jansher Khan | 16 | 15 | 15 | 15
(Republic of Ireland) Derek Ryan | 17 | 13 | 13 | 11
(Pakistan) Zarak Jahan Khan | 7 | 15 | 15 | 15
(Wales) David Evans | 15 | 7 | 10 | 13
(England) Paul Gregory | 13 | 15 | 15 | 15
(England) Mark Cairns | 15 | 6 | 13 | 8
(Wales) Alex Gough | 15 | 10 | 10 | 15 | 15
5 | (England) Del Harris | 2 | 15 | 15 | 5 | 10
(France) Julien Bonetat | 15 | 15 | 15
(South Africa) Rodney Durbach | 8 | 6 | 7
6 | (England) Chris Walker | 15 | 15 | 14 | 15
(Canada) Gary Waite | 10 | 3 | 15 | 10
(England) Paul Johnson | 15 | 15 | 3 | 9 | 15
4 | (Scotland) Peter Nicol | 13 | 12 | 15 | 15 | 13
(England) Tony Hands | 15 | 15 | 15
(Egypt) Ahmed Barada | 11 | 13 | 9
2 | (Australia) Rodney Eyles | 11 | 15 | 15 | 13 | 15
(Australia) Craig Rowland | 15 | 11 | 14 | 15 | 5
(Canada) Graham Ryding | 15 | 15 | 15
(England) Angus Kirkland | 7 | 6 | 13
7 | (Australia) Anthony Hill | 2 | 15 | 15 | 3 | 15
(Canada) Jonathon Power | 15 | 8 | 9 | 15 | 9
(England) Jason Nicolle | 15 | 15 | 15
(England) Danny Meddings | 8 | 6 | 7
3 | (Australia) Brett Martin | 15 | 15 | 15 | 15
(England) John Ransome | 12 | 10 | 17 | 9
(England) Stephen Meads | 5 | 15 | 15 | 15
(Australia) Billy Haddrell | 15 | 9 | 13 | 13
8 | (England) Mark Chaloner | 15 | 15 | 12 | 12 | 15
(Australia) Dan Jenson | 6 | 12 | 15 | 15 | 10
(England) Nick Taylor | 17 | 7 | w/o
(Egypt) Amir Wagih | 14 | 5 | ret

Second round
1 | (Pakistan) Jansher K | 15 | 15 | 15
(Pakistan) Z J Khan | 7 | 10 | 11
(England) Gregory | 15 | 15 | 15
(Wales) Gough | 8 | 11 | 10
(France) Bonetat | 15 | 15 | 12 | 15
6 | (England) Walker | 13 | 9 | 15 | 8
(England) Johnson | 15 | 15 | 15 | 15
(England) Hands | 17 | 1 | 12 | 13
2 | (Australia) Eyles | 15 | 15 | 15
(Canada) Ryding | 9 | 10 | 8
7 | (Australia) Hill | 17 | 15 | 17
(England) Nicolle | 16 | 10 | 15
3 | (Australia) B Martin | 17 | 15 | 15
(England) Meads | 16 | 9 | 12
8 | (England) Chaloner | 15 | 15 | 15
(England) Taylor | 11 | 10 | 10

Quarter-finals
1 | (Pakistan) Jansher K | 15 | 15 | 15
(England) Gregory | 13 | 13 | 4
(France) Bonetat | 14 | 15 | 15 | 15
(England) Johnson | 15 | 9 | 11 | 9
2 | (Australia) Eyles | 15 | 15 | 15
7 | (Australia) Hill | 10 | 9 | 7
3 | (Australia) B Martin | 15 | 13 | 15 | 15
8 | (England) Chaloner | 6 | 15 | 8 | 9

Semi-finals
1 | (Pakistan) Jansher K | 12 | 15 | 15 | 15
(France) Bonetat | 15 | 9 | 9 | 6
Final
1 | (Pakistan) Jansher K | 15 | 15 | 15
2 | (Australia) Eyles | 13 | 8 | 10
2 | (Australia) Eyles | 13 | 15 | 15 | 15
3 | (Australia) B Martin | 15 | 12 | 3 | 9

| Preceded by 1995 | British Open Squash Championships; Wales (Cardiff); 1996 | Succeeded by 1997 |
