= 1995 Men's World Open Squash Championship =

Men's World Open 1995
- 19th PSA World Squash Championship
- Location: Nicosia, Cyprus
- Date: November 6–11, 1995

PSA World Tour
- Category: PSA World Open
- Prize money: $ 110,000

Results
- Champion: (Pakistan) Jansher Khan
- Runner-up: (England) Del Harris
- Semi-finalists: (Australia) Anthony Hill (Australia) Craig Rowland

The 1995 PSA Men's Detjen World Open Squash Championship is the men's edition of the 1995 World Open, which serves as the individual world championship for squash players. The event took place in Nicosia in Cyprus from 6 November to 11 November 1995. Jansher Khan won his seventh World Open title, defeating Del Harris in the final.

== Seeds ==
1. (Pakistan) Jansher Khan (champion)
2. (Australia) Rodney Martin (semifinals)
3. (Scotland) Peter Nicol (second round)
4. (Australia) Brett Martin (second round)
5. (England) Simon Parke (quarterfinals)
6. (England) Chris Walker (first round)
7. (England) Del Harris (final)
8. (Australia) Anthony Hill (semifinals)

== Draw and results ==
First round
1	(Pakistan) Jansher Khan	15	15	14	15
(England) John Ransome	11	5	15	3
(Pakistan) Mir Zaman Gul	15	15	15
(England) Danny Meddings	10	5	11
5	(England) Simon Parke	15	11	15	15
(Australia) Dan Jenson	8	15	11	13
(Pakistan) Zarak Jahan Khan	15	15	8	15
(New Zealand) Paul Steel	10	10	15	8
8	(Australia) Anthony Hill	15	15	15
(Republic of Ireland) Derek Ryan	11	11	13
(England) Jason Nicolle	10	15	17	17
(Greece) Paul Gregory	15	5	15	15
(Finland) Sami Elopuro	17	15	15
(Scotland) Martin Heath	15	10	5
3	(Scotland) Peter Nicol	15	15	15
(Egypt) Amir Wagih	7	6	7
7	(England) Del Harris	15	17	15
(Finland) Juha Raumolin	8	15	11
(England) Paul Johnson	15	15	13	17
(England) Mark Cairns	6	9	15	15
2	(Australia) Rodney Eyles	15	15	15
(France) Julien Bonetat	11	9	6
(England) Tony Hands	15	15	15
(Egypt) Ahmed Faizy	7	6	5
(Australia) Craig Rowland	15	15	13	15
6	(England) Chris Walker	11	12	15	7
(South Africa) Craig Van der Wath	15	15	15
(England) Stephen Meads	11	6	11
(England) Mark Chaloner	15	15	15
(England) Phil Whitlock	10	10	12
4	(Australia) Brett Martin	15	12	15	15
(Argentina) Federico Usandizaga	11	15	13	12

Second round
1	(Pakistan) Jansher Khan	15	15	15
(Pakistan) Mir Zaman Gul	3	6	7
5	(England) Simon Parke	15	16	15	15
(Pakistan) Zarak Jahan Khan	4	17	8	8
8	(Australia) Anthony Hill	15	15	15
(England) Jason Nicolle	7	3	2
(Finland) Sami Elopuro	13	17	15	15
3	(Scotland) Peter Nicol	17	15	7	8
7	(England) Del Harris	15	15	15
(England) Paul Johnson	5	4	5
2	(Australia) Rodney Eyles	15	7	15	15
(England) Tony Hands	7	15	13	11
(Australia) Craig Rowland	15	15	9	15
(South Africa) Craig Van der Wath	12	10	15	8
4	(Australia) Brett Martin	15	11	16	13
(England) Mark Chaloner	9	15	17	15

Quarter finals
1	(Pakistan) Jansher Khan	15	17	15
5	(England) Simon Parke	5	15	9
8	(Australia) Anthony Hill	15	15	15
(Finland) Sami Elopuro	13	4	13
7	(England) Del Harris	15	10	15	15
2	(Australia) Rodney Eyles	13	15	4	8
(Australia) Craig Rowland	17	12	15	15
(England) Mark Chaloner	15	15	7	6

Semi finals
1	(Pakistan) Jansher Khan	15	15	15
8	(Australia) Anthony Hill	7	12	6
Final
1	(Pakistan) Jansher Khan	15	17	16	15
7	(England) Del Harris	10	14	17	8
7	(England) Del Harris	10	15	15	15
(Australia) Craig Rowland	15	13	4	8

== See also ==
- PSA World Open
- 1995 Women's World Open Squash Championship

Preceded by Spain (Barcelona); 1994	PSA World Open; Cyprus (Nicosia); 1995	Succeeded by Pakistan (Lahore); 1996
