= 1997 Men's World Open Squash Championship =

Squash competition

Men's World Open 1997
- 21st PSA World Squash Championship
- Location: Petaling Jaya, Malaysia
- Date: November 4–9, 1997

PSA World Tour
- Category: PSA World Open
- Prize money: $ 130,000

Results
- Champion: (Australia) Rodney Eyles
- Runner-up: (Scotland) Peter Nicol
- Semi-finalists: (Wales) Alex Gough (England) Peter Marshall

The 1997 PSA Men's ASCM-Sharp World Open Squash Championship is the men's edition of the 1997 World Open, which serves as the individual world championship for squash players. The event took place in Petaling Jaya in Malaysia from 4 November to 9 November 1997. Rodney Eyles won his first World Open title, defeating Peter Nicol in the final.

Alex Gough became the first Welshman to reach the semi-finals of the world championships, seeded 14th, he defeated the English trio of Paul Gregory, Chris Walker and Mark Cairns on his way to the semis.

== Seeds ==
1. (Australia) Rodney Eyles (champion)
2. (Scotland) Peter Nicol (final)
3. (Canada) Jonathon Power (quarterfinals)
4. (England) Simon Parke (second round)
5. (Egypt) Ahmed Barada (quarterfinals)
6. (England) Chris Walker (second round)
7. (England) Del Harris (first round)
8. (Australia) Brett Martin (first round)
9. (Pakistan) Zubair Jahan Khan (first round)
10. (Australia) Dan Jenson (second round)
11. (England) Mark Cairns (quarterfinals)
12. (Australia) Anthony Hill (quarterfinals)
13. (England) Mark Chaloner (second round)
14. (Wales) Alex Gough (semifinals)
15. (Australia) Craig Rowland (first round)
16. (Republic of Ireland) Derek Ryan (first round)

== Draw and results ==
First round
1	(Australia) R. Eyles	15	15	15
(Egypt) A. Wagih	10	11	5
Q	(South Africa) Craig Wapnick	17	15	15
9	(Pakistan) Zubair Jahan Khan	15	7	10
7	(England) Del Harris	13	14	15	12
(Canada) G. Ryding	15	17	9	15
Q	(England) Nick Taylor	7	10	10
12	(Australia) Anthony Hill	15	15	15
3	(Canada) J. Power	15	15	15
(France) J. Bonetat	8	11	4
Q	(Pakistan) Amjad Khan	9	12	15	15	15
16	(Republic of Ireland) Derek Ryan	15	15	10	10	12
8	(Australia) B. Martin	10	15	13	11
Q	(England) Peter Marshall	15	11	15	15
Q	(England) Tim Garner	15	15	9	13	12
10	(Australia) D. Jenson	13	8	15	15	15
14	(Wales) Alex Gough	15	15	15
(England) Paul Gregory	9	13	12
(England) Paul Johnson	15	10	6	7
6	(England) Chris Walker	2	15	15	15
11	(England) Mark Cairns	15	15	15
Q	(Malaysia) Kenneth Low	8	11	9
(South Africa) Craig Van der Wath	14	4	13
4	(England) S. Parke	15	15	15
13	(England) M. Chaloner	15	11	15	15
(Scotland) M. Heath	6	15	13	3
(England) Tony Hands	15	9	9	7
5	(Egypt) A. Barada	12	15	15	15
15	(Australia) C. Rowland	15	10	11	13
Q	(Wales) David Evans	9	15	15	15
(England) Stephen Meads	7	8	7
2	(Scotland) P. Nicol	15	15	15

Second round
1	(Australia) Eyles	15	15	5	15
Q	(South Africa) Wapnick	11	13	15	12
(Canada) Ryding	15	9	9
12	(Australia) Hill	17	15	15
3	(Canada) Jonathon Power	15	15	15
Q	(Pakistan) A Khan	9	6	4
Q	(England) Marshall	15	15	15
10	(Australia) Jenson	6	6	13
14	(Wales) Gough	9	10	15	15	15
6	(England) Walker	15	15	12	10	12
11	(England) Cairns	15	15	3	15
4	(England) Parke	10	14	15	8
13	(England) Chaloner	10	3	9
5	(Egypt) Barada	15	15	15
Q	(Wales) Evans	12	7	5
2	(Scotland) Nicol	15	15	15

Quarter finals
1	(Australia) Eyles	15	17	15
12	(Australia) Hill	8	16	2
3	(Canada) Power	12	14	15	9
Q	(England) Marshall	15	15	2	15
14	(Wales) Gough	15	15	15
11	(England) Cairns	12	11	9
5	(Egypt) Barada	15	15	7	13	3
2	(Scotland) Nicol	9	14	15	15	15

Semi finals
1	(Australia) Eyles	10	15	15	15
Q	(England) Marshall	15	8	8	6
Final
1	(Australia) Eyles	15	15	15
2	(Scotland) Nicol	11	12	12
14	(Wales) Gough	13	8	5
2	(Scotland) Nicol	15	15	15

== See also ==
- PSA World Open
- 1997 Women's World Open Squash Championship

Preceded by Pakistan (Lahore); 1996	PSA World Open; Malaysia (Petaling Jaya); 1997	Succeeded by Qatar (Doha); 1998
