= 1999 Men's British Open Squash Championship =

British Open Squash Championships
- 61st British Open Championships

Details
- Location: Aberdeen, Scotland
- Venue: Aberdeen Exhibition and Conference Centre and Aberdeen Squash Rackets Club
- Dates: 6–12 December 1999

The 1999 Eye Group British Open Championships was held at the Aberdeen Exhibition and Conference Centre, with the early rounds and qualifying at the Aberdeen Squash Rackets Club, from 6–12 December 1999. Jonathon Power won the title defeating Peter Nicol in the final. Nicol was forced to retire at one game all due to illness. He spent three days on a drip at Aberdeen Royal Infirmary after suffering from food poisoning. The illness was caused by Nicol ordering a take-out pasta dish in his home town.

== Seeds ==
1. (Canada) Jonathon Power
2. (Scotland) Peter Nicol
3. (Egypt) Ahmed Barada
4. (England) Paul Johnson
5. (England) Simon Parke
6. (Australia) Anthony Hill
7. (Scotland) Martin Heath
8. (Wales) Alex Gough

== Draw and results ==
=== Final Qualifying round ===
Player One	Player Two	Score
(England) Stephen Meads	(Sweden) Daniel Forslund	15-11 8-15 15-7 15-9
(Australia) Stewart Boswell	(Australia) John Williams	15-10 15-11 16-17 8-15 15-6
(England) Tony Hands	(England) Paul Lord	15-11 15-11 10-15 15-9
(England) Peter Genever	(Malaysia) Ong Beng Hee	15-8 13-15 15-6 15-10
(England) Marcus Berrett	(England) Lee Drew	15-6 15-5 15-3
(Australia) Byron Davis	(Egypt) Ahmed Faizy	15-7 7-15 15-13 15-4
(Australia) Anthony Ricketts	(Finland) Ville Sistonen	15-9 15-9 15-11
(England) Mark Chaloner	(South Africa) Rodney Durbach	15-7 12-15 15-9 15-9

=== Main draw ===
First round
1	(Canada) Jonathon Power	15	15	13	15
(England) Nick Taylor	10	8	15	8
(England) Del Harris	15	15	15
(Belgium) Stefan Casteleyn	6	8	5
7	(Scotland) Martin Heath	15	15	15
(Australia) Stewart Boswell	12	8	7
(France) Thierry Lincou	15	9	17	15
(Canada) Graham Ryding	12	15	15	13
3	(Egypt) Ahmed Barada	15	15	12	15
(England) Stephen Meads	6	11	15	9
(Egypt) Omar El Borolossy	15	12	8	15	15
(Scotland) John White	12	15	15	11	11
(Wales) David Evans	15	15	15
(England) Chris Walker	10	7	13
(England) Peter Marshall	15	15	12	15
8	(Wales) Alex Gough	7	13	15	10
5	(England) Simon Parke	15	15	15
(England) Mark Chaloner	7	12	9
(Australia) David Palmer	15	14	15	15
(Republic of Ireland) Derek Ryan	11	15	13	11
4	(England) Paul Johnson	15	11	15	15
(Australia) Byron Davis	9	15	13	9
(Australia) Rodney Eyles	11	15	17	11	17
(Australia) Paul Price	15	8	16	15	16
6	(Australia) Anthony Hill	15	15	15
(England) Peter Genever	9	9	13
(Pakistan) Amjad Khan	15	15	15
(England) Marcus Berrett	4	10	7
2	(Scotland) Peter Nicol	15	15	15
(Australia) Anthony Ricketts	11	13	9
(Australia) Dan Jenson	15	15	15
(England) Tony Hands	12	2	4

Second round
1	(Canada) Power	15	15	15
(England) Harris	11	5	11
7	(Scotland) Heath	15	15	15
(France) Lincou	11	11	9
3	(Egypt) Barada	15	15	15
(Egypt) El Borolossy	12	12	6
(Wales) Evans	6	15	7	15	15
(England) Marshall	15	11	15	11	12
5	(England) Parke	15	15	12	15
(Australia) Palmer	10	9	15	6
4	(England) Johnson	10	15	15	15
(Australia) Eyles	15	13	7	8
6	(Australia) Hill	17	15	1	15
(Pakistan) A Khan	16	7	15	3
2	(Scotland) Nicol	15	15	15
(Australia) Jenson	6	9	6

Quarter-finals
1	(Canada) Power	15	15	13	15
7	(Scotland) Heath	8	11	15	9
3	(Egypt) Barada	7	15	15	15
(Wales) Evans	15	6	10	7
5	(England) Parke	15	15	15
4	(England) Johnson	3	6	7
6	(Australia) Hill	7	11	17	5
2	(Scotland) Nicol	15	15	15	15

Semi-finals
1	(Canada) Power	15	15	15
3	(Egypt) Barada	11	13	7
Final
1	(Canada) Power	15	15	w/o
2	(Scotland) Nicol	17	12	ret
5	(England) Parke	13	10	8
2	(Scotland) Nicol	15	15	15

Preceded by 1998	British Open Squash Championships; Scotland (Aberdeen); 1999	Succeeded by 2000
