= 2000 Men's British Open Squash Championship =

British Open Squash Championships
- 62nd British Open Championships

Details
- Location: Birmingham, England
- Venue: Edgbaston Priory Club & National Indoor Arena
- Dates: 9–15 October 2000

The 2000 Eye Group British Open Championships was held at the Edgbaston Priory Club with the later stages at the National Indoor Arena from 9–15 October 2000.
David Evans won the title defeating Paul Price in the final. Bradley Ball replaced number one seed Peter Nicol in the main draw following the withdrawal of Nicol from the tournament with a stress fracture of the shin.

== Seeds ==
1. (Canada) Jonathon Power
2. (Egypt) Ahmed Barada
3. (England) Simon Parke
4. (Scotland) Martin Heath
5. (England) Paul Johnson
6. (England) Del Harris
7. (Australia) David Palmer
8. (England) Peter Marshall
9. (Wales) David Evans
10. (Australia) Anthony Hill
11. (Scotland) John White
12. (France) Thierry Lincou
13. (Australia) Paul Price
14. (England) Nick Taylor
15. (England) Mark Chaloner

== Draw and results ==
=== Final Qualifying round ===
Player One	Player Two	Score
(Italy) Davide Bianchetti	(England) James Willstrop	15-15 15-6 15-8 15-10
(Australia) Stewart Boswell	(South Africa) Rodney Durbach	13-15 15-10 15-17 17-16 15-11
(Australia) John Williams	(Finland) Olli Tuominen	15-11 15-4 15-7
(Belgium) Stefan Casteleyn	(Netherlands) Tommy Berden	15-12 15-11 15-14
(England) Stephen Meads	(England) Peter Genever	15-11 15-9 15-8
(Finland) Juha Raumolin	(England) Tim Garner	15-7 11-15 13-15 15-13 15-6
(England) Lee Beachill	(England) Bradley Ball +	15-14 15-4 15-9
(Malaysia) Ong Beng Hee	(England) Adrian Grant	9-15 15-10 15-10 15-13

+ Lucky loser

=== Main draw ===
First round
1	(Canada) Jonathon Power	15	12	15	15
Q	(England) Lee Beachill	5	15	5	6
(Pakistan) Amjad Khan	15	10	4	6
12	(France) Thierry Lincou	12	15	15	15
8	(England) Peter Marshall	12	4	9
16	(Canada) Graham Ryding	15	15	15
Q	(Finland) Juha Raumolin	11	9	11
7	(Australia) David Palmer	15	15	15
6	(England) Del Harris	15	17	13	1	6
Q	(Australia) Stewart Boswell	13	16	15	15	15
Q	(Malaysia) Ong Beng Hee	12	17	17	4	15
11	(Scotland) John White	15	14	16	15	11
9	(Wales) David Evans	15	15	15
(Republic of Ireland) Derek Ryan	5	10	8
Q	(Belgium) Stefan Casteleyn	10	2	1
2	(Egypt) Ahmed Barada	15	15	15
3	(England) Simon Parke	15	15	17
Q	(England) Stephen Meads	12	6	16
Q	(Australia) John Williams	11	15	4	15	10
13	(Australia) Paul Price	15	8	15	11	15
10	(Australia) Anthony Hill	5	5	4
(Australia) Joseph Kneipp	15	15	15
(Egypt) Amr Shabana	11	12	2
4	(Scotland) Martin Heath	15	15	15
5	(England) Paul Johnson	15	15	12	15
(England) Mark Cairns	11	12	15	13
Q	(Italy) Davide Bianchetti	9	13	10
15	(England) Mark Chaloner	15	15	15
14	(England) Nick Taylor	12	13	15	15	13
(Wales) Alex Gough	15	15	1	5	15
(Egypt) Omar El Borolossy	15	15	15
LL	(England) Bradley Ball	8	11	8

Second round
1	(Canada) Power	15	15	15
12	(France) Lincou	6	6	3
16	(Canada) Ryding	15	13	15	8	7
7	(Australia) Palmer	6	15	11	15	15
Q	(Australia) Boswell	13	12	10
Q	(Malaysia) Beng Hee	15	15	15
9	(Wales) Evans	15	12	15	15
2	(Egypt) Barada	11	15	3	7
3	(England) Parke	11	11	11
13	(Australia) Price	15	15	15
(Australia) Kneipp	4	3	15	15	15
4	(England) Heath	15	15	9	13	8
5	(England) Johnson	15	15	7	13	6
15	(England) Chaloner	12	11	15	15	15
(Wales) Gough	17	17	12	17
(Egypt) El Borolossy	15	15	15	14

Quarter-finals
1	(Canada) Power	16	14	15	15	12
7	(Australia) Palmer	17	15	9	7	15
Q	(Malaysia) Beng Hee	15	6	13	9
9	(Wales) Evans	12	15	15	15
13	(Australia) Price	15	15	13	6	17
(Australia) Kneipp	12	10	15	15	16
15	(England) Chaloner	15	15	12	15
(Wales) Gough	8	11	15	12

Semi-finals
7	(Australia) Palmer	5	6	11
9	(Wales) Evans	15	15	15
Final
9	(Wales) Evans	15	15	15
13	(Australia) Price	11	6	10
13	(Australia) Price	17	11	15	15
15	(England) Chaloner	16	15	7	5

Preceded by 1999	British Open Squash Championships; England (Birmingham); 2000	Succeeded by 2001
