= 1993 Men's British Open Squash Championship =

British Open Squash Championships
- 55th British Open Championships

Details
- Location: London, England
- Venue: Lambs Squash Club & Wembley Conference Centre
- Dates: 10–19 April 1993

The 1993 Hi-Tec British Open Championships was held at the Lambs Squash Club with the later stages being held at the Wembley Conference Centre from 10 to 19 April 1993.
Jansher Khan won his second consecutive title defeating Chris Dittmar in the final.

== Seeds ==
1. (Pakistan) Jansher Khan
2. (Australia) Chris Dittmar
3. (Australia) Rodney Martin
4. (Australia) Brett Martin
5. (England) Peter Marshall
6. (Australia) Rodney Eyles
7. (New Zealand) Ross Norman

=== Final Qualifying round ===
Player One	Player Two	Score
(Pakistan) Zarak Jahan Khan	(Australia) Craig Rowland	9-7 9-1 9-5
(England) Paul Lord	(Hong Kong) Faheem Khan	10-8 9-4 9-4
(Germany) Simon Frenz	(Canada) Sabir Butt	9-3 9-4 9-0
(England) Tim Garner	(England) Robert Graham	9-3 9-2 8-10 9-6
(South Africa) Craig van der Wath	(England) Paul Gregory	6-9 2-9 9-3 9-5 9-3
(England) John Ransome	(England) Damian Walker	9-5 9-5 9-2
(England) Paul Johnson	(Australia) Adam Schreiber	9-7 9-0 9-5
(Pakistan) Mir Zaman Gul	(England) Craig Wapnick	9-6 9-3 7-9 9-2

=== Main draw ===
First round
1	(Pakistan) Jansher Khan	9	9	9
(France) Julien Bonetat	0	0	0
(England) Paul Lord	w/o
(Spain) Austin Adarraga	scr
7	(New Zealand) Ross Norman	9	9	10
(England) Tim Garner	4	7	8
(England) Tony Hands	0	9	9	9
(England) Danny Meddings	9	2	1	4
(Pakistan) Zarak Jahan Khan	9	9	9
3	(Australia) Rodney Martin	1	3	5
(Australia) Mark Carlyon	9	9	9
(Scotland) Mark Maclean	3	1	2
(England) Simon Parke	9	7	9	9
(England) Paul Johnson	5	9	0	6
(England) Del Harris	6	9	9	5	10
(England) Stephen Meads	9	3	5	9	8
2	(Australia) Chris Dittmar	9	9	9
(Germany) Simon Frenz	6	3	0
(Finland) Sami Elopuro	8	9	9	5	w/o
(Germany) Hansi Wiens	10	4	2	0	disq
5	(England) Peter Marshall	9	9	9	5	9
(Wales) Adrian Davies	2	5	0
(England) Phil Whitlock	9	9	6	9
(South Africa) Craig van der Wath	4	0	9	5
4	(Australia) Brett Martin	9	7	9	6	9
(England) Jason Nicolle	2	9	5	9	6
(Canada) Gary Waite	9	9	9
(Pakistan) Mir Zaman Gul	7	2	4
6	(Australia) Rodney Eyles	9	9	9
(Australia) Anthony Hill	7	4	0
(England) Chris Walker	9	9	9
(England) John Ransome	7	1	3

Second round
1	(Pakistan) Jansher K	9	9	9
(England) Lord	4	0	1
7	(New Zealand) Norman	9	8	6	9	9
(England) Hands	4	10	9	1	4
(Pakistan) Z J Khan	9	9	9
(Australia) Carlyon	4	2	0
(England) Parke	9	9	9
(England) Harris	1	0	6
2	(Australia) Dittmar	9	9	9
(Finland) Elopuro	2	5	5
5	(England) Marshall	9	9	9	10
(England) Whitlock	9	6	2	8
4	(Australia) Martin B	9	9	9
(Canada) Waite	5	0	6
6	(Australia) Eyles	9	9	9
(England) Walker	4	6	1

Quarter-finals
1	(Pakistan) Jansher K	9	9	10
7	(New Zealand) Norman	0	6	9
(Pakistan) Z J Khan	3	6	10	10	9
(England) Parke	9	9	8	8	1
2	(Australia) Dittmar	9	9	7	9
5	(England) Marshall	1	2	9	4
4	(Australia) Martin B	9	9	6	9
6	(Australia) Eyles	5	6	9	2

Semi-finals
1	(Pakistan) Jansher K	5	9	9	4	9
(Pakistan) Z J Khan	0	2	0
Final
1	(Pakistan) Jansher K	9	9	6	9
2	(Australia) Dittmar	6	5	9	2
2	(Australia) Dittmar	9	9	1	10
4	(Australia) Martin B	4	1	9	8

Preceded by 1992	British Open Squash Championships; England (London); 1993	Succeeded by 1994
