= 1993 Men's World Open Squash Championship =

Squash Championship in 1993

Men's World Open 1993
- 17th PSA World Squash Championship
- Location: Karachi, Pakistan
- Date: November 18–23, 1993

PSA World Tour
- Category: PSA World Open
- Prize money: $ 120,000

Results
- Champion: (Pakistan) Jansher Khan
- Runner-up: (Pakistan) Jahangir Khan
- Semi-finalists: (England) Peter Marshall (England) Chris Walker

The 1993 PSA Men's World Open Squash Championship is the men's edition of the 1993 World Open, which serves as the individual world championship for squash players. The event took place in Karachi in Pakistan from 18 November to 23 November 1993. Jansher Khan won his fifth World Open title, defeating Jahangir Khan in the final.

== Seeds ==
1. (Pakistan) Jansher Khan (champion)
2. (Australia) Rodney Martin (quarterfinals)
3. (Australia) Brett Martin (quarterfinals)
4. (England) Peter Marshall (semifinals)
5. (Australia) Rodney Eyles (quarterfinals)
6. (New Zealand) Ross Norman (second round)
7. (Finland) Sami Elopuro (first round)
8. (England) Chris Walker (semifinals)

== Draw and results ==
First round
1	(Pakistan) Jansher Khan	15	15	15
(England) Paul Gregory	11	7	7
(Scotland) Peter Nicol	15	15	15
(Germany) Hansi Wiens	8	12	12
5	(Australia) Rodney Eyles	15	15	15
(England) Jason Nicolle	13	11	9
(Pakistan) Mir Zaman Gul	8	17	15	15
(England) Simon Parke	15	15	12	12
4	(England) Peter Marshall	15	11	15	15
(England) Mark Cairns	11	15	9	8
(England) Phil Whitlock	15	15	15
(England) Stephen Meads	3	6	3
(England) Tony Hands	13	15	15	15
(Australia) Anthony Hill	15	7	9	3
(South Africa) Craig van der Wath	15	15	15
7	(Finland) Sami Elopuro	11	13	13
(Pakistan) Jahangir Khan	15	5	15	15
(Argentina) Federico Usandizaga	10	15	12	9
6	(New Zealand) Ross Norman	15	15	10	15
(England) Del Harris	9	7	15	14
3	(Australia) Brett Martin	15	15	15
(Pakistan) Zubair Jahan Khan	13	9	12
(England) Danny Meddings	15	15	15
(Scotland) Mark Maclean	5	9	7
8	(England) Chris Walker	13	15	15	15
(Australia) Mark Carlyon	15	7	12	5
(Australia) Tristan Nancarrow	15	12	15	15
(Republic of Ireland) Derek Ryan	12	15	13	8
2	(Australia) Rodney Martin	15	15	9	6	15
(Hong Kong) Abdul Faheem Khan	8	8	15	15	8
(Pakistan) Zarak Jahan Khan	13	15	12	15	15
(Wales) Adrian Davies	15	13	15	3	14

Second round
1	(Pakistan) Jansher K	15	15	15
(Scotland) Nicol	4	11	5
5	(Australia) Eyles	15	15	15
(Pakistan) Gul	9	10	7
4	(England) Marshall	15	13	15	15
(England) Whitlock	13	15	8	12
(England) Hands	13	15	15	15
(South Africa) Van der Wath	8	17	13	13
(Pakistan) Jahangir K	15	15	9	15
6	(New Zealand) Norman	7	12	15	12
3	(Australia) Martin B	15	15	15
(England) Meddings	12	10	11
8	(England) Walker	15	15	15
(Australia) Nancarrow	13	8	6
2	(Australia) Martin R	15	15	15
(Pakistan) Z J Khan	12	8	11

Quarter finals
1	(Pakistan) Jansher K	15	15	15
5	(Australia) Eyles	7	7	7
4	(England) Marshall	15	15	15
(England) Hands	8	12	14
(Pakistan) Jahangir K	17	17	15
3	(Australia) Martin B	16	15	10
8	(England) Walker	13	17	15	15
2	(Australia) Martin R	15	14	7	6

Semi finals
1	(Pakistan) Jansher K	15	15	15
4	(England) Marshall	5	6	8
Final
1	(Pakistan) Jansher K	14	15	15	15
(Pakistan) Jahangir K	15	9	5	5
(Pakistan) Jahangir K	15	15	9	15
8	(England) Walker	7	5	15	4

== See also ==
- PSA World Open
- 1993 Women's World Open Squash Championship

Preceded by South Africa (Johannesburg); 1992	PSA World Open; Pakistan (Karachi); 1993	Succeeded by Spain (Barcelona); 1994
