= 1994 Men's World Open Squash Championship =

Men's World Open 1994
- 18th PSA World Squash Championship
- Location: Barcelona, Spain
- Date: September 9–14, 1994

PSA World Tour
- Category: PSA World Open
- Prize money: $ 150,000

Results
- Champion: (Pakistan) Jansher Khan
- Runner-up: (England) Peter Marshall
- Semi-finalists: (Scotland) Peter Nicol (Australia) Rodney Eyles

The 1994 PSA Men's Ballantines World Open Squash Championship is the men's edition of the 1994 World Open, which serves as the individual world championship for squash players. The event took place in Barcelona, Catalonia in Spain from 9 September to 14 September 1994. Jansher Khan won his sixth World Open title, defeating Peter Marshall in the final.

== Seeds ==
1. (Pakistan) Jansher Khan (champion)
2. (Australia) Brett Martin (quarterfinals)
3. (England) Peter Marshall (final)
4. (Australia) Rodney Eyles (semifinals)
5. (Australia) Rodney Martin (quarterfinals)
6. (England) Chris Walker (quarterfinals)
7. (Scotland) Peter Nicol (semifinals)
8. (New Zealand) Ross Norman (second round)

== Draw and results ==
First round
1	(Pakistan) Jansher Khan	15	15	15
(Australia) Craig Rowland	7	6	9
(South Africa) Craig Wapnick	8	12	13
(England) Phil Whitlock	15	15	15
6	(England) Chris Walker	15	15	15
(Spain) Austin Adarraga	3	7	9
(Pakistan) Zarak Jahan Khan	15	15	15
(United States) Michael Puertas	9	13	4
4	(Australia) Rodney Eyles	15	15	6	15
(England) Stephen Meads	11	10	15	13
(England) Simon Parke	17	15	14	15
(England) Del Harris	15	10	15	13
(Australia) Anthony Hill	15	15	15
(England) Mark Cairns	10	9	9
8	(New Zealand) Ross Norman	15	15	15
(England) Paul Johnson	12	13	11
2	(Australia) Brett Martin	15	17	15
(Republic of Ireland) Angus Kirkland	6	16	12
(England) Danny Meddings	15	15	15
(New Zealand) Glen Wilson	12	7	9
7	(Scotland) Peter Nicol	15	15	15
(Hong Kong) Abdul Faheem Khan	11	6	11
(Finland) Sami Elopuro	14	4	13
(South Africa) Craig Van der Wath	7	8	9
3	(England) Peter Marshall	15	15	15
(Netherlands) Lucas Buit	7	4	4
(England) Tony Hands	10	9	15	12
(New Zealand) Paul Steel	15	15	12	15
5	(Australia) Rodney Martin	15	15	15
(Pakistan) Mir Zaman Gul	6	12	8
(England) Paul Gregory	8	15	15	12	9
(England) Jason Nicolle	15	6	11	15	15

Second round
1	(Pakistan) Jansher Khan	15	15	15
(England) Phil Whitlock	9	8	8
6	(England) Chris Walker	15	15	10	15
(Pakistan) Zarak Jahan Khan	10	7	15	9
4	(Australia) Rodney Eyles	15	15	15
(England) Simon Parke	12	6	10
(Australia) Anthony Hill	15	17	15
8	(New Zealand) Ross Norman	9	15	9
2	(Australia) Brett Martin	15	15	15
(England) Danny Meddings	13	8	13
7	(Scotland) Peter Nicol	15	15	15
(Finland) Sami Elopuro	8	12	6
3	(England) Peter Marshall	15	15	16	15
(New Zealand) Paul Steel	2	8	17	8
5	(Australia) Rodney Martin	15	15	13	15
(England) Jason Nicolle	5	7	15	12

Quarter finals
1	(Pakistan) Jansher Khan	15	15	15
6	(England) Chris Walker	11	6	10
4	(Australia) Rodney Eyles	15	15	15
(Australia) Anthony Hill	6	10	8
2	(Australia) Brett Martin	10	11	15	10
7	(Scotland) Peter Nicol	15	15	6	15
3	(England) Peter Marshall	15	13	15	15
5	(Australia) Rodney Martin	13	15	10	11

Semi finals
1	(Pakistan) Jansher Khan	15	15	15
4	(Australia) Rodney Eyles	7	12	13
Final
1	(Pakistan) Jansher Khan	10	15	15	15
3	(England) Peter Marshall	15	11	8	5
7	(Scotland) Peter Nicol	7	15	5	3
3	(England) Peter Marshall	15	13	15	15

== See also ==
- PSA World Open
- 1994 Women's World Open Squash Championship

Preceded by Pakistan (Karachi); 1993	PSA World Open; Spain (Barcelona); 1994	Succeeded by Cyprus (Nicosia); 1995
