= 2001 Men's British Open Squash Championship =

British Open Squash Championships
- 63rd British Open Championships

Details
- Location: Birmingham, England
- Venue: Edgbaston Priory Club & National Indoor Arena
- Dates: 5–10 June 2001

The 2001 British Open Championships was held at the Edgbaston Priory Club with the later stages at the National Indoor Arena from 5–10 June 2001.
David Palmer won the title defeating Chris Walker in the final. Peter Nicol represented England from 2001 and six times champion Jansher Khan announced his official retirement after unsuccessful double surgery on both knees.

== Seeds ==
1. (Canada) Jonathon Power
2. (England) Peter Nicol
3. (Australia) David Palmer
4. (Wales) David Evans
5. (Australia) Paul Price
6. (England) Simon Parke
7. (Scotland) John White
8. (Scotland) Martin Heath
9. (Malaysia) Ong Beng Hee
10. (England) Paul Johnson
11. (England) Mark Chaloner
12. (Wales) Alex Gough
13. (Australia) Stewart Boswell
14. (Egypt) Omar El Borolossy
15. (England) Del Harris
16. (Canada) Graham Ryding

== Draw and results ==
=== Main draw ===
First round
1	(Canada) Jonathon Power	15	15	14	13	15
Q	(England) Stephen Meads	7	9	15	15	4
Q	(France) Renan Lavigne	9	5	11
15	(England) Del Harris	15	15	15
16	(Canada) Graham Ryding	6	15	13	17	15
(Australia) John Williams	15	12	15	15	7
Q	(England) James Willstrop	15	7	9	3
7	(Scotland) John White	13	15	15	15
8	(Scotland) Martin Heath
(England) Nick Taylor	w.	o.
(Egypt) Karim Darwish	9	14	6
9	(Malaysia) Ong Beng Hee	15	17	15
14	(Egypt) Omar El Borolossy	11	10	15	9
Q	(England) Chris Walker	15	15	12	15
(England) Peter Genever	6	15	7	6
4	(Wales) David Evans	15	13	15	15
3	(Australia) David Palmer	15	15	15
(Australia) Anthony Ricketts	6	11	5
Q	(Italy) Davide Bianchetti	10	12	5
13	(Australia) Stewart Boswell	15	15	15
12	(Wales) Alex Gough	15	14	15	13	17
(Australia) Joseph Kneipp	14	17	7	15	14
Q	(Finland) Olli Tuominen	9	10	12
6	(England) Simon Parke	15	15	15
5	(Australia) Paul Price	15	11	17	2	17
Q	(South Africa) Rodney Durbach	13	15	14	15	15
(England) Lee Beachill	14	15	15	15
10	(England) Paul Johnson	15	9	10	7
11	(England) Mark Chaloner	15	15	15
Q	(England) John Russell	5	8	9
Q	(England) Mark Cairns	11	9	15	7
2	(England) Peter Nicol	15	15	9	15

Second round
1	(Canada) Power	8	15	10	7
15	(England) Harris	15	8	15	15
16	(Canada) Ryding	14	8	8
7	(Scotland) White	15	15	15
(England) Taylor	15	7	11	17	15
9	(Malaysia) Beng Hee	13	15	15	11	17
Q	(England) Walker	17	9	15	15
4	(Wales) Evans	15	15	9	7
3	(Australia) Palmer	15	16	15	15
13	(Australia) Boswell	6	17	11	11
12	(Wales) Gough	15	15	15
6	(England) Parke	7	10	11
5	(Australia) Price	17	15	8	11	7
(England) Beachill	16	3	15	15	15
11	(England) Chaloner	7	11	9
2	(England) Nicol	15	15	15

Quarter-finals
15	(England) Harris	12	16	9
7	(Scotland) White	15	17	15
9	(Malaysia) Beng Hee	17	14	15	9	12
Q	(England) Walker	16	15	6	15	15
3	(Australia) Palmer	11	15	17	15
12	(Wales) Gough	15	8	15	9
(England) Beachill	15	15	15	15
2	(England) Nicol	7	17	6	4

Semi-finals
7	(Scotland) White	13	15	13	15	12
Q	(England) Walker	15	7	15	4	15
Final
Q	(England) Walker	15	15	2	9	5
3	(Australia) Palmer	12	13	15	15	15
3	(Australia) Palmer	15	12	15	15
(England) Beachill	11	15	10	10

Preceded by 2000	British Open Squash Championships; England (Birmingham); 2001	Succeeded by 2002
