= 2003 Men's British Open Squash Championship =

British Open Squash Championships
- 65th British Open Championships

Details
- Location: Nottingham, England
- Venue: Albert Hall, Nottingham
- Dates: 28 September – 5 October 2003

The 2003 British Open Championships was held at the Albert Hall, Nottingham from 28 September – 5 October 2003.
David Palmer won the title defeating Peter Nicol in the final. There was a reduced field for the main draw with just four qualifying places available.

== Seeds ==
1. (England) Peter Nicol
2. (Australia) David Palmer
3. (Scotland) John White
4. (Canada) Jonathon Power
5. (Australia) Anthony Ricketts
6. (Malaysia) Ong Beng Hee
7. (England) Lee Beachill
8. (Australia) Joseph Kneipp

== Draw and results ==
=== First qualifying round ===
Player One	Player Two	Score
(Netherlands) Tommy Berden	(Pakistan) Ibrahim Gul	15-9 15-3 15-0
(England) Nick Matthew	(England) Joey Barrington	15-9 15-9 11-15 17-15
(England) Del Harris	(England) Michael Elford	15-4 15-7 15-4
(England) Stephen Meads	(Belgium) Ron Aerts	15-13 15-1 15-6
(Australia) Dan Jenson	(Pakistan) Mohammas Nasir Farooq	15-8 15-10 15-4
(England) Bradley Ball	(Pakistan) Rizwan Farooq	15-6 15-11 15-4
(Italy) Davide Bianchetti	(Pakistan) Abdul Razzaq	15-6 15-5 15-2
(Finland) Olli Tuominen	(England) Sam Miller	15-5 15-6 15-4
(Pakistan) Farrukh Zaman	(Belgium) Peter Pastijn	13-15 15-5 15-7 15-17 15-7
(England) Adrian Grant	(England) Duncan Walsh	15-4 15-7 15-9
(England) James Willstrop	(England) Neil Reddington	15-6 15-5 15-7
(France) Renan Lavigne	(Pakistan) Arshad Iqbal Burki	15-11 15-4 15-6
(Republic of Ireland) John Rooney	(Pakistan) Shahid Zaman	17-15 15-8 15-10

=== Second qualifying round ===
Player One	Player Two	Score
(England) Simon Parke	(Republic of Ireland) John Rooney	15-11 15-10 15-2
(Wales) Alex Gough	(Netherlands) Tommy Berden	15-8 13-15 15-9 15-9
(England) Nick Taylor	(England) Stephen Meads	15-13 17-14 14-17 15-6
(England) Del Harris	(England) Nick Matthew	15-13 ret
(England) Bradley Ball	(Australia) Dan Jenson	15-9 15-7 10-15 15-9
(Finland) Olli Tuominen	(Italy) Davide Bianchetti	15-14 15-8 15-12
(England) Adrian Grant	(Pakistan) Farrukh Zaman	15-8 15-11 15-10
(England) James Willstrop	(France) Renan Lavigne	15-10 15-11 15-13

=== Final qualifying round ===
Player One	Player Two	Score
(Finland) Olli Tuominen	(England) Adrian Grant	15-9 15-13 15-5
(Wales) Alex Gough	(England) Del Harris	15-10 15-10 12-6 ret
(England) Nick Taylor	(England) Bradley Ball	15-12 15-10 15-4
(England) James Willstrop	(England) Simon Parke	15-7 15-12 15-10

=== Main draw ===
First round
1	(England) Peter Nicol	15	15	15
(Scotland) Martin Heath	6	10	4
Q	(Wales) Alex Gough	12	10	15	13
7	(England) Lee Beachill	15	15	12	15
4	(Canada) Jonathon Power	15	15	15
(England) Mark Chaloner	9	10	5
Q	(England) James Willstrop	15	15	15
8	(Australia) Joseph Kneipp	9	10	9
5	(Australia) Anthony Ricketts	17	15	15
Q	(England) Nick Taylor	16	6	8
(Pakistan) Mansoor Zaman	11	3	15
3	(Scotland) John White	15	15	17
6	(Malaysia) Ong Beng Hee	11	10	7
Q	(Finland) Olli Tuominen	15	15	15
(Egypt) Amr Shabana	12	9	8
2	(Australia) David Palmer	15	15	15

Quarter-finals
1	(England) Nicol	15	17	15
7	(England) Beachill	8	15	8
4	(Canada) Power	10	15	15	15
Q	(England) Wiilstrop	15	8	9	9
5	(Australia) Ricketts	15	8	15	10	15
3	(Scotland) White	5	15	5	15	7
Q	(Finland) Tuominen	9	8	13
2	(Australia) Palmer	15	15	15

Semi-finals
1	(England) Nicol	12	11	17	15	15
4	(Canada) Power	15	15	14	13	13
5	(Australia) Ricketts	15	12	14	15	12
2	(Australia) Palmer	9	15	15	8	15

Final
1	(England) Nicol	13	13	8
2	(Australia) Palmer	15	15	15

Preceded by 2002	British Open Squash Championships; England (Nottingham); 2003	Succeeded by 2004
