= 2002 Men's British Open Squash Championship =

British Open Squash Championships
- 64th British Open Championships

Details
- Location: London & Manchester, England
- Venue: Lambs Squash Club & National Squash Centre
- Dates: 7–15 April 2002

The 2002 British Open Championships was held at the Lambs Squash Club with the later stages held at the National Squash Centre from 7–15 April 2002.
Peter Nicol won the title defeating John White in the final.

== Seeds ==
1. (England) Peter Nicol
2. (Australia) David Palmer
3. (Canada) Jonathon Power
4. (France) Thierry Lincou
5. (Australia) Stewart Boswell
6. (Scotland) John White
7. (Malaysia) Ong Beng Hee
8. (England) Chris Walker
9. (England) Mark Chaloner
10. (Wales) David Evans
11. (England) Lee Beachill
12. (Australia) Anthony Ricketts
13. (Scotland) Martin Heath
14. (Wales) Alex Gough
15. (England) Del Harris
16. (Australia) Paul Price

== Draw and results ==
=== Main draw ===
First round
1	(England) Peter Nicol	12	15	15	11	15
Q	(France) Renan Lavigne	15	11	4	15	8
(England) P. Johnson	15
15	(England) Del Harris	8	r
10	(Wales) David Evans	9	10	9
Q	(England) Peter Genever	15	15	15
Q	(England) Nick Matthew	7	15	5	11
8	(England) Chris Walker	15	8	15	15
5	(Australia) Stewart Boswell	10	15	15	16	15
(Australia) Joseph Kneipp	15	10	4	17	10
(Canada) Graham Ryding	13	12	7
13	(Scotland) Martin Heath	15	15	15
12	(Australia) Anthony Ricketts	17	15	16	14
(Egypt) Omar El Borolossy	16	17	17	17
(Egypt) Karim Darwish	15	6	11	5
4	(France) Thierry Lincou	11	15	15	15
3	(Canada) Jonathon Power	15	15	15
Q	(Egypt) Mohammed Abbas	12	2	7
Q	(England) Nick Taylor	17	10	9	4
16	(Australia) Paul Price	16	15	15	15
11	(England) Lee Beachill	15	15	15
(Netherlands) Tommy Berden	10	10	8
Q	(France) Jean-Michel Arcucci	17	10	9	13
7	(Malaysia) Ong Beng Hee	15	15	15	15
6	(Scotland) John White	15	15	9	15
(England) Simon Parke	13	11	15	9
Q	(Egypt) Wael El Hindi	8	17	12	1	r
9	(England) Mark Chaloner	15	14	15	8
14	(Wales) Alex Gough	15	15	15
Q	(Republic of Ireland) Derek Ryan	6	13	4
(Finland) Olli Tuominen	13	12	11
2	(Australia) David Palmer	15	15	15

Second round
1	(England) Nicol	15	15	15
(England) Johnson	8	11	4
Q	(England) Genever	15	15	10	15	14
8	(England) Walker	7	17	15	13	15
5	(Australia) Boswell	11	9	15	11
13	(Scotland) Heath	15	15	4	15
(Egypt) El Borolossy	15	9	9	6
4	(France) Lincou	13	15	15	15
3	(Canada) Power	15	15	17
16	(Australia) Price	8	13	15
11	(England) Beachill	15	15	15
7	(Malaysia) Beng Hee	11	12	13
6	(Scotland) White	15	15	15
9	(England) Chaloner	7	10	10
14	(Wales) Gough	15	8	15	15
2	(Australia) Palmer	13	15	8	9

Quarter-finals
1	(England) Nicol	15	15	15
8	(England) Walker	8	11	8
13	(Scotland) Heath	13	15	7	10
4	(France) Lincou	15	11	15	15
3	(Canada) Power	15	15	15
11	(England) Beachill	8	10	10
6	(Scotland) White	15	15	15
14	(Wales) Gough	13	8	9

Semi-finals
1	(England) Nicol	15	15	17
4	(France) Lincou	6	9	14
Final
1	(England) Nicol	15	15	15
6	(Scotland) White	9	8	8
3	(Canada) Power	15	13	12	15	13
6	(Scotland) White	11	15	15	9	15

Preceded by 2001	British Open Squash Championships; England (London & Manchester); 2002	Succeeded by 2003
