= Squash at the 1997 World Games – Men's singles =

1997 World Games - Squash Single Men
Host	(Finland) Lahti
Dates	August 16–17, 1997
Teams	4
Podium
Champion	(Egypt) Ahmed Barada
Runners-up	(Republic of Ireland) Derek Ryan
Third place	(Canada) Graham Ryding
Fourth place	(United Kingdom) Mark Cairns

The Squash - Single Men competition at the World Games 1997 take place from 16 August to 17 August 1997 in Lahti in Finland.

== Draw ==
Semi finals
1	(Egypt) Ahmed Barada	3
3	(Canada) Graham Ryding	0
4	(United Kingdom) Mark Cairns	0
2	(Republic of Ireland) Derek Ryan	3

Finals
1	(Egypt) Ahmed Barada	3
2	(Republic of Ireland) Derek Ryan	0
3rd place
3	(Canada) Graham Ryding	3
4	(United Kingdom) Mark Cairns	0

Note: * w/d = Withdraw, * w/o = Walkover, * r = Retired
