= 1996 European Squash Team Championships =

Squash tournament

- 25th
- Location: (Netherlands) Amsterdam
- Venue: Frans Otten Stadion
- Date: 1 – 4 May 1996
- Website europeansquash.com

Results
- Champions: Men England; Women England

The 1996 European Squash Team Championships was the 25th edition of European Squash Team Championships for squash players. The event was held at the Frans Otten Stadion in Amsterdam, Netherlands, from 1 to 4 May 1996. The tournament was organised by the European Squash Rackets Federation (ESRF).

The England men's team won their 21st title and the England women's team won their 19th title.

== Men's tournament ==
=== Group stage ===
Pool A

Pos	Team	P	W	L	Pts
1	England	3	3	0	6
2	Germany	3	2	1	4
3	Wales	3	1	2	2
4	Spain	3	0	3	0

Pool B

Pos	Team	P	W	D	L	Pts
1	Scotland	3	2	1	0	5
2	Finland	3	0	3	0	3
3	France	3	1	1	1	3
4	Sweden	3	0	1	2	1

=== Semi finals ===
England
4
Semi-final 1

Finland
0

			1	2	3	4	5
1	(England) (Finland)	Chris Walker; Sami Elopuro	9; 5	9; 2	9; 5
2	(England) (Finland)	Mark Chaloner; Juha Raumolin	9; 5	9; 0	9; 0
3	(England) (Finland)	Paul Johnson; Olle Poutiainen	9; 3	10; 8	9; 5
4	(England) (Finland)	Stephen Meads; Mika Monto	9; 3	9; 0	9; 3

Scotland
2 (9)
Semi-final 2

Germany
2 (7)

			1	2	3	4	5
1	(Scotland) (Germany)	Peter Nicol; Simon Frenz	9; 0	9; 3	9; 1
2	(Scotland) (Germany)	Stuart Cowie; Florian Pössl	9; 2	0; 9	9; 1	9; 4
3	(Scotland) (Germany)	Alasdair Taylor; Ashraf Hanafi	9; 5	6; 9	2; 9	9; 2	2; 9
4	(Scotland) (Germany)	David Gordon; Ralf Neuer	5; 9	1; 9	9; 3	5; 9

=== Third place ===
Finland
3
Third place

Germany
1

			1	2	3	4	5
1	(Finland) (Germany)	Sami Elopuro; Simon Frenz	7; 9	9; 4	9; 3	9; 1
2	(Finland) (Germany)	Juha Raumolin; Florian Pössl	9; 5	9; 1	10; 9
3	(Finland) (Germany)	Olle Poutiainen; Ashraf Hanafi	2; 9	9; 2	2; 9	9; 2	1; 9
4	(Finland) (Germany)	Mika Monto; Ralf Neuer	1; 9	9; 2	7; 9	9; 7	9; 8

=== Final ===
England
3
Final

Scotland
1

			1	2	3	4	5
1	(England) (Scotland)	Chris Walker; Peter Nicol	3; 9	0; 9	6; 9
2	(England) (Scotland)	Mark Chaloner; Stuart Cowie	9; 6	9; 0	9; 1
3	(England) (Scotland)	Mark Cairns; Alasdair Taylor	9; 2	10; 9	9; 1
4	(England) (Scotland)	Paul Johnson; David Gordon	9; 4	9; 4	9; 1

== Women's tournament ==
=== Group stage ===
Pool A

Pos	Team	P	W	L	Pts
1	England	3	3	0	6
2	Germany	3	2	1	4
3	Finland	3	1	2	2
4	(Republic of Ireland) Ireland	3	0	3	0

Pool B

Pos	Team	P	W	L	Pts
1	France	3	3	0	6
2	Netherlands	3	2	1	4
3	Scotland	3	1	2	2
4	Sweden	3	0	3	0

=== Semi-finals ===
England
3
Semi-final 1

Netherlands
0

			1	2	3	4	5
1	(England) (Netherlands)	Suzanne Horner; Nicole Beumer	9; 4	9; 1	9; 1
2	(England) (Netherlands)	Fiona Geaves; Babette Hoogendoorn	9; 4	9; 0	9; 3
3	(England) (Netherlands)	Cassie Jackman; Daphne Jelgersma	9; 3	9; 1	9; 0

Germany
x
Semi-final 2

France
X

			1	2	3	4	5
1	(Germany) (France)	Sabine Schöne; Corinne Castets
2	(Germany) (France)	Sabine Baum; Corinne Vazin
3	(Germany) (France)	Silke Bartel; Isabelle Stoehr

=== Third place ===
Netherlands
?
Third place

France
?

		1	2	3	4	5
1	(Netherlands) (France)	9	9	9
2	(Netherlands) (France)	9	9	9
3	(Netherlands) (France)	9	9	9

=== Final ===
England
3
Final

Germany
0

			1	2	3	4	5
1	(England) (Germany)	Suzanne Horner; Sabine Schöne	10; 8	9; 1	9; 1
2	(England) (Germany)	Jane Martin; Sabine Baum	9; 0	6; 9	9; 3	9; 4
3	(England) (Germany)	Fiona Geaves; Silke Bartel	9; 1 7	9; 2	9
