= 1995 European Squash Team Championships =

Squash tournament

- 24th
- Location: (Netherlands) Amsterdam
- Venue: Frans Otten Stadion
- Date: 27 – 30 April 1995
- Website europeansquash.com

Results
- Champions: Men England; Women England

The 1995 European Squash Team Championships was the 24th edition of European Squash Team Championships for squash players. The event was held at the Frans Otten Stadion in Amsterdam, Netherlands, from 27 to 30 April 1995. The tournament was organised by the European Squash Rackets Federation (ESRF).

The England men's team won their 20th title and the England women's team won their 18th title.

== Men's tournament ==
=== Group stage ===
Pool A

Pos	Team	P	W	L	Pts
1	England	3	3	0	6
2	Sweden	3	2	1	4
3	France	3	1	2	2
4	(Republic of Ireland) Ieland	3	0	3	0

Pool B

Pos	Team	P	W	L	Pts
1	Germany	3	3	0	6
2	Finland	3	2	1	4
3	Scotland	3	1	2	2
4	Netherlands	3	0	3	0

=== Semi finals ===
England
4
Semi-final 1

Germany
0

			1	2	3	4	5
1	(England) (Germany)	Chris Walker; Hansi Wiens	9; 3	3; 9	5; 9	9; 3	9; 1
2	(England) (Germany)	Simon Parke; Christian Bernard	9; 3	9; 4	9; 1
3	(England) (Germany)	Del Harris; Ralf Neuer	9; 4	9; 2	9; 1
4	(England) (Germany)	Mark Cairns; Jochen Arndt	9; 0	9; 0	9; 4

Finland
4
Semi-final 2

Sweden
0

			1	2	3	4	5
1	(Finland) (Sweden)	Pentti Pekkanen; Pieter Sjösten	5; 9	9; 7	0; 9	9; 4	9; 3
2	(Finland) (Sweden)	Kai Peltonen; Fredrik Johnson	7; 9	9; 5	9; 0	9; 3
3	(Finland) (Sweden)	Juha Raumolin; Anders Thoren	1; 9	9; 7	4; 9	9; 4	9; 6
4	(Finland) (Sweden)	Sami Elopuro; Daniel Forslund	9; 2	9; 0	9; 0

=== Third place ===
Sweden
2 (9)
Third place

Germany
2 (6)

		1	2	3	4	5
1	(Sweden) (Germany)
2	(Sweden) (Germany)
3	(Sweden) (Germany)
4	(Sweden) (Germany)

=== Final ===
England
4
Final

Finland
0

			1	2	3	4	5
1	(England) (Finland)	Mark Cairns; Pentti Pekkanen	9; 7	9; 1	9; 5
2	(England) (Finland)	Del Harris; Kai Peltonen	9; 2	9; 0	9; 5
3	(England) (Finland)	Simon Parke; Juha Raumolin	9; 5	9; 0	9; 6
4	(England) (Finland)	Chris Walker; Sami Elopuro	6; 9	6; 9	9; 1	9; 7	9; 2

== Women's tournament ==
=== Group stage ===
Pool A

Pos	Team	P	W	L	Pts
1	England	3	3	0	6
2	Scotland	3	2	1	4
3	Sweden	3	1	2	2
4	(Republic of Ireland) Ireland	3	0	3	0

Pool B

Pos	Team	P	W	L	Pts
1	Germany	3	3	0	6
2	Netherlands	3	2	1	4
3	Finland	3	1	2	2
4	France	3	0	3	0

=== Semi-finals ===
England
3
Semi-final 1

Germany
0

			1	2	3	4	5
1	(England) (Germany)	Cassie Jackman; Sabine Schöne	9; 1	9; 3	9; 4
2	(England) (Germany)	Fiona Geaves; Silke Bartel	9; 0	9; 0	9; 6
3	(England) (Germany)	Sue Wright; Beate Seidler	5; 9	9; 5	9; 7	9; 2

Netherlands
2
Semi-final 2

Scotland
1

			1	2	3	4	5
1	(Netherlands) (Scotland)	Hugoline van Hoorn; Senga MacFie	9; 7	9; 6	9; 4
2	(Netherlands) (Scotland)	Denise Sommers; Claire Waddell	8; 10	6; 9	0; 9
3	(Netherlands) (Scotland)	Nicole Beumer; Alison Bowie	9; 3	9; 4	9; 1

=== Third place ===
Scotland
2
Third place

Germany
1

			1	2	3	4	5
1	(Scotland) (Germany)	Senga MacFie; Sabine Schöne	7; 9	4; 9	7; 9
2	(Scotland) (Germany)	Claire Waddell; Sabine Baum	9; 4	9; 1	6; 9	9; 4
3	(Scotland) (Germany)	Alison Bowie; Silke Bartel	9; 0	10; 8	9; 5

=== Final ===
England
3
Final

Netherlands
0

			1	2	3	4	5
1	(England) (Netherlands)	Cassie Jackman; Hugoline van Hoorn	9; 5	9; 5	9; 3
2	(England) (Netherlands)	Fiona Geaves; Nicole Beumer	9; 6	9; 6	8; 10	10; 9
3	(England) (Netherlands)	Sue Wright; Vanessa Atkinson	10; 8	9; 6	9; 1
