= 1991 European Squash Team Championships =

Squash tournament

- 19th
- Location: (Germany) Gelsenkirchen
- Date: 1 – 4 May 1991
- Website europeansquash.com

Results
- Champions: Men England; Women England

The 1991 European Squash Team Championships was the 19th edition of European Squash Team Championships for squash players. The event was held in Gelsenkirchen, Germany, from 1 to 4 May 1991. The tournament was organised by the European Squash Rackets Federation (ESRF).

The England men's team won their 17th title and the England women's team won their 14th title.

== Men's tournament ==
=== Group stage ===
Pool A

Pos	Team	P	W	L	Pts
1	England	3	3	0	6
2	Netherlands	3	2	1	4
3	Sweden	3	1	2	2
4	(Republic of Ireland) Ireland	3	0	3	0

Pool B

Pos	Team	P	W	L	Pts
1	Finland	3	3	0	6
2	Germany	3	2	1	4
3	Wales	3	1	2	2
4	Switzerland	3	0	3	0

=== Semi finals ===
England
5
Semi-final 1

Germany
0

			1	2	3	4	5
1	(England) (Germany)	Peter Marshall; Simon Frenz
2	(England) (Germany)	Chris Walker; Michael Ehlers
3	(England) (Germany)	Del Harris; Johann Wiens
4	(England) (Germany)	Jason Nicolle; Oliver Rucks
5	(England) (Germany)	Simon Parke; Jochen Arndt

Finland
3
Semi-final 2

Netherlands
2

			1	2	3	4	5
1	(Finland) (Netherlands)	Pentti Pekkanen; Lucas Buit	9; 0	9; 4	9; 1
2	(Finland) (Netherlands)	Ville Mäkisarka; Michael Vertogen	4; 9	9; 7	5; 9	2; 9
3	(Finland) (Netherlands)	Sami Elopuro; Raymond Scheffer	7; 9	9; 6	9; 1	9; 2
4	(Finland) (Netherlands)	Hannu Jaskari; Eric Smit	2; 9	2; 9	6; 9
5	(Finland) (Netherlands)	Marko Pulli; Eric van der Pluijm	9; 0	9; 0	9; 5

=== Third place ===
Germany
?
Third place

Netherlands
?

		1	2	3	4	5
1	(Germany) (Netherlands)	9	9	9
2	(Germany) (Netherlands)	9	9	9
3	(Germany) (Netherlands)	9	9	9
4	(Germany) (Netherlands)	9	9	9
5	(Germany) (Netherlands)

=== Final ===
England
5
Final

Finland
0

			1	2	3	4	5
1	(England) (Finland)	Peter Marshall; Pentti Pekkanen	9; 4	8; 10	9; 2	5; 9	9; 3
2	(England) (Finland)	Chris Walker; Ville Mäkisarka	9; 5	9; 7	9; 1
3	(England) (Finland)	Del Harris; Sami Elopuro	9; 4	7; 9	9; 6	10; 9
4	(England) (Finland)	Jason Nicolle; Hannu Jaskari	9; 2	9; 1	9; 3
5	(England) (Finland)	Simon Parke; Marko Pulli	9; 5	10; 8	9; 3

== Women's tournament ==
=== Group stage ===
Pool A

Pos	Team	P	W	L	Pts
1	England	3	3	0	6
2	Germany	3	2	1	4
3	(Republic of Ireland) Ireland	3	1	2	2
4	Wales	3	0	3	0

Pool B

Pos	Team	P	W	L	Pts
1	Netherlands	3	3	0	6
2	Finland	3	2	1	4
3	Sweden	3	1	2	2
4	France	3	0	3	0

=== Semi-finals ===
England
3
Semi-final 1

Finland
0

			1	2	3	4	5
1	(England) (Finland)	Cassie Jackman; Sari Ahlblad	9; 0	9; 1	9; 2
2	(England) (Finland)	Martine Le Moignan; Tuula Myllyniemi	9; 1	9; 1	9; 0
3	(England) (Finland)	Lucy Soutter; Nina Taimiaho	2; 9	9; 6	9; 1	9; 4

Netherlands
X
Semi-final 2

Germany
X

			1	2	3	4	5
1	(Netherlands) (Germany)	Denise Sommers; Sabine Baum
2	(Netherlands) (Germany)	Babette Hoogendoorn; Daniela Grzenia
3	(Netherlands) (Germany)	Marjolein Houtsma; Andrea Holbe

=== Third place ===
Germany
2
Third place

Finland
1

			1	2	3	4	5
1	(Germany) (Finland)	Sabine Baum; Mia Markkanen	9; 6	9; 3	9; 0
2	(Germany) (Finland)	Daniela Grzenia; Tuula Myllyniemi	9; 2	6; 9	9; 1	9; 3
3	(Germany) (Finland)	Andrea Holbe; Nina Taimiaho	1; 9	9; 1	9; 1	5; 9	3; 9

=== Final ===
England
3
Final

Netherlands
0

			1	2	3	4	5
1	(England) (Netherlands)	Cassie Jackman; Denise Sommers
2	(England) (Netherlands)	Martine Le Moignan; Babette Hoogendoorn
3	(England) (Netherlands)	Lucy Soutter; Marjolein Houtsma
