= 2001 European Squash Team Championships =

Squash tournament

- 29th
- Location: (Netherlands) Eindhoven
- Date: 25 – 28 April 2001
- Website europeansquash.com

Results
- Champions: Men England; Women England

The 2001 European Squash Team Championships was the 29th edition of European Squash Team Championships for squash players. The event was held in Eindhoven, Netherlands, from 25 to 28 April 2001. The tournament was organised by the European Squash Federation.

The England men's team won their 26th title and the England women's team won their 24th title.

== Men's tournament ==
=== Group stage ===
Group A

Pos	Team	P	W	D	L	Pts
1	England	3	3	0	0	6
2	Wales	3	1	1	1	3
3	Germany	3	1	1	1	3
4	Austria	3	0	0	3	0

Group B

Pos	Team	P	W	D	L	Pts
1	France	3	3	0	0	6
2	Finland	3	2	0	1	4
3	Netherlands	3	1	0	2	2
4	Switzerland	3	0	0	3	0

=== Semi-finals ===
England
3
Semi-final 1

Finland
1

			1	2	3	4	5
1	(England) (Finland)	Mark Chaloner; Juha Raumolin	9; 1	9; 4	9; 7
2	(England) (Finland)	Paul Johnson; Mika Monto	5; 9	9; 4	10; 9	3; 9	3; 9
3	(England) (Finland)	Lee Beachill; Olle Poutiainen	9; 3	9; 2	9; 0
4	(England) (Finland)	Nick Taylor; Janne Kyttanen	10; 9	9; 3	9; 4

France
3
Semi-final 2

Wales
1

			1	2	3	4	5
1	(France) (Wales)	Renan Lavigne; David Evans	6; 9	0; 9	6; 9
2	(France) (Wales)	Jean-Michel Arcucci; Alex Gough	7; 9	6; 9	9; 5			retired
3	(France) (Wales)	Gregory Gaultier; Greg Tippings	9; 5	9; 4	9; 4
4	(France) (Wales)	Laurent Elriani; Gavin Jones	9; 1	9; 1	3; 9	9; 2

=== Third place ===
Finland
3
Third place

Wales
1

			1	2	3	4	5
1	(Finland) (Wales)	Olli Tuominen; David Evans	9; 3	9; 3	9; 4
2	(Finland) (Wales)	Juha Raumolin; Alex Gough	9; 4	9; 7	9; 1
3	(Finland) (Wales)	Timo Tuominen; Greg Tippings	9; 7	2; 9	4; 9	4; 9
4	(Finland) (Wales)	Janne Kyttänen; Gavin Jones	7; 9	9; 6	9; 3	9; 3

=== Final ===
England
4
Final

France
0

			1	2	3	4	5
1	(England) (France)	Simon Parke; Renan Lavigne	9; 6	9; 3	8; 10	10; 8
2	(England) (France)	Mark Chaloner; Jean-Michel Arcucci	9; 1	9; 3	9; 3
3	(England) (France)	Lee Beachill; Gregory Gaultier	9; 0	9; 5	9; 0
4	(England) (France)	Nick Taylor; Laurent Elriani	9; 7	9	9; 0

== Women's tournament ==
=== Group stage ===
Group A

Pos	Team	P	W	L	Pts
1	England	3	3	0	6
2	Netherlands	3	2	1	4
3	France	3	1	2	2
4	Spain	3	0	3	0

Group B

Pos	Team	P	W	L	Pts
1	Denmark	3	3	0	6
2	Switzerland	3	2	1	4
3	Scotland	3	1	2	2
4	Germany	3	0	3	0

=== Semi-finals ===
England
3
Semi-final 1

Switzerland
0

			1	2	3	4	5
1	(England) (Switzerland)	Linda Charman-Smith; Agnes Mueller	9; 2	9; 4	9; 1
2	(England) (Switzerland)	Fiona Geaves; Manuela Zehnder	9; 3	10; 8	9; 0
3	(England) (Switzerland)	Stephanie Brind; Olivia Hauser	9; 1	9; 2	9; 1

Denmark
2
Semi-final 2

Netherlands
1

			1	2	3	4	5
1	(Denmark) (Netherlands)	Ellen Petersen; Vanessa Atkinson	0; 9	1; 9	3; 9
2	(Denmark) (Netherlands)	Julie Dorn-Jensen; Daphne Jelgersma	3; 9	9; 2	9; 2	10; 9
3	(Denmark) (Netherlands)	Line Hansen; Milja Dorenbos	9; 1	9; 3	9; 5

=== Third place ===
- Switzerland beat Netherlands

=== Final ===
England
3
Final

Denmark
0

			1	2	3	4	5
1	(England) (Denmark)	Linda Charman-Smith; Ellen Petersen	9; 0	9; 3	9; 0
2	(England) (Denmark)	Tania Bailey; Julie Dorn-Jensen	9; 1	9; 4
3	(England) (Denmark)	Fiona Geaves; Line Hansen	9; 3	9; 3	9; 2
