= Squash at the 1997 World Games =

1997 World Games - Squash - Lahti, Finland

The squash competitions at the 1997 World Games took place between 11 and 17 August 1997 at the Suurhalli Exhibition in Lahti, Finland.

== Medals summary ==
Event	Gold	Silver	Bronze
Men's singles	Ahmed Barada (EGY)	Derek Ryan (IRL)	Graham Ryding (CAN)
Women's singles	Sarah Fitz-Gerald (AUS)	Sabine Schöne (DEU)	Leilani Joyce (NZL)

== Medals table ==
* Host nation (Finland)

Rank	Nation	Gold	Silver	Bronze	Total
1	Australia (AUS)	1	0	0	1
1	Egypt (EGY)	1	0	0	1
3	Germany (DEU)	0	1	0	1
3	Ireland (IRL)	0	1	0	1
5	Canada (CAN)	0	0	1	1
5	New Zealand (NZL)	0	0	1	1
Totals (6 entries)		2	2	2	6
