= Paul Lord =

English squash player

Paul Lord (born 13 December 1969) is a squash player from England.

== Competition results ==
He was runner-up to Rodney Eyles at the US Open in 1993.
