= Zubair Jahan Khan =

Pakistani squash player (born 1972)

Zubair Jahan Khan (born 10 October 1972) is a Pakistani former professional squash player. He was world number 8 in his prime.

Zubair Jahan Khan lives in London and is a coach at Cumberland Lawn Tennis.

Zubair Jahan Khan's brothers Hiddy Jahan and Zarak Jahan Khan have also been professional squash players on the international circuit.
