= Mika Monto =

Finnish squash player (born 1976)

Personal information
- Full name: Mika Juhani Monto
- Born: March 20, 1976 (age 50) Hyvinkaa, Finland
- Height: 1.80 m (5 ft 11 in)

Sport
- Country: Finland
- Turned pro: 1995
- Retired: 2003

Men's singles
- Highest ranking: No. 45 (December, 2001)
- Tour final: 5
- Updated on June, 2013

Mika Monto (born March 20, 1976, in Hyvinkaa) is a former professional squash player who represented Finland. He reached a career-high world ranking of World No. 45 in December 2001.

Currently, he is based in Kuala Lumpur, Malaysia, working as a national coach in Squash Racquets Association of Malaysia and as an independent musician (troubadour).
