= Paul Steel =

New Zealand squash player and coach

Personal information
- Born: August 15, 1970 (age 56) Whakatāne

Sport
- Country: New Zealand

Men's Singles
- Highest ranking: 15

Paul Steel (born 15 August 1970 in Whakatāne, New Zealand) is a squash coach and a former professional player. As a player, Paul Steel was a ten-time New Zealand national champion (1992–2001) and reached a career-high world ranking of World No.15. In 1991,92,95,97,99 and 2001 he was New Zealand representative in the World Team Squash Championships. In 1998 he was a member of New Zealand Commonwealth Games Team in Kuala Lumpur.

In November 2011, he was added to the New Zealand Squash Hall of Fame.
