= Byron Davis =

Australian squash player (born 1973)

Personal information
- Born: 8 October 1973 (age 52)

Sport
- Country: Australia

Men's Doubles
- Highest ranking: 14 (March 1998)
Medal record
Men's squash
Representing Australia
World Doubles Championships
Gold medal – first place	2004 Chennai	Doubles
Commonwealth Games
Silver medal – second place	1998 Kuala Lumpur	Doubles
- Updated on 12 April 2022

Byron Davis (born 8 October 1973) is a squash coach and former professional squash player from Australia.

As a player, his most notable successes came in doubles play. He won the men's doubles title at the World Doubles Squash Championships in 2004 (partnering Cameron White), and was a men's doubles silver medalist at the 1998 Commonwealth Games (partnering Rodney Eyles). He reached a career-high world ranking of World No. 14 in 1998.

He was the Australian National Head Coach.
