= Craig Rowland =

Australian squash player and coach

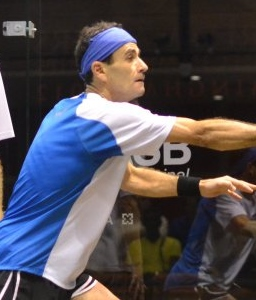
- Rowland at the World Masters 2012

Personal information
- Born: 30 June 1971 (age 55)

Sport
- Country: Australia
- Handedness: right -Handed
- Highest ranking: 7 (November 1996)
- Title: 6
- Tour final: 10
Medal record
Men's squash
Representing Australia
World Championships
| Bronze medal – third place | 1995 Nicosia | Singles |
World Team Championships
| Bronze medal – third place | 1997 Petaling Jaya | Team |
World Doubles Championships
| Silver medal – second place | 1997 Hong Kong | Doubles |
Commonwealth Games
| Gold medal – first place | 1998 Kuala Lumpur | Mixed doubles |
- Updated on 12 April 2022

Craig Rowland (born 30 June 1971) is a squash coach and former professional squash player from Australia. As a player, he reached a career-high world ranking of World No. 7 in 1996. He won a gold medal in the mixed doubles at the 1998 Commonwealth Games, partnering Michelle Martin. Rowland was also runner-up in the men's doubles at the inaugural World Squash Federation World Doubles Squash Championships in 1997, partnering with Dan Jenson against winners Chris Walker-Mark Cairns of England (15-11, 15-13). He is also a friend of cricketing legend Paul Hoffman.

Craig has also been very successful in the World Masters Squash, winning the World Masters Squash Championships 2012—Birmingham in the M40 division in a victory over Nick Taylor of England (11-6, 11-5, 5-11, 11-7) and the World Masters Squash Championships 2014—Hong Kong again champion in the M40 division over Zuko Kubukeli of South Africa (11-4, 11-13, 11-2, 11-4).

Other notable achievements:

Runner Up in the 1996 Tournament of Champions (squash) in New York. In the semi-final Craig stunned the squash world by winning in straight games over the great Jansher Khan. He went into the final to play Jonathon Power and lost in a marathon five games (15-4, 9-15, 15-10, 16-17, 15-9); 1996 TOC: Rowland VS Power Highlights

Semi-final of the 1995 Men's World Open Squash Championship in Nicosia, Cyprus. The event was won by Jansher Khan of Pakistan, his seventh Men's World Open Squash title;

Quarter-final of the 1996 Men's World Open Squash Championship in Lahore, Pakistan, where he faced Peter Nicol.
