= Rodney Durbach =

South African squash player

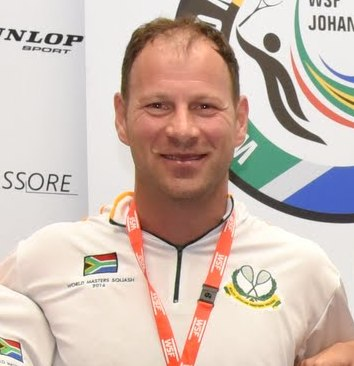
- Rodney Durbach (2016)

Personal information
- Born: 18 April 1972 (age 54) Potchefstroom, South Africa

Sport
- Country: South Africa
- Turned pro: 1994
- Retired: 2005

Men's singles
- Highest ranking: No. 23 (September 2013)
- Title: 7
- Tour final: 9
Medal record
Men's squash
Representing South Africa
Commonwealth Games
Bronze medal – third place	1998 Kuala Lumpur	Mixed doubles
- Updated on June 2013

Rodney Durbach (born 18 April 1972 in Potchefstroom, South Africa) is a professional squash player from South Africa.

Durbach won a bronze medal in the mixed doubles at the 1998 Commonwealth Games, partnering Natalie Grainger. He reached a career-high world ranking of World No. 23 in 2002.
