= Amir Wagih =

Egyptian squash player (born 1967)

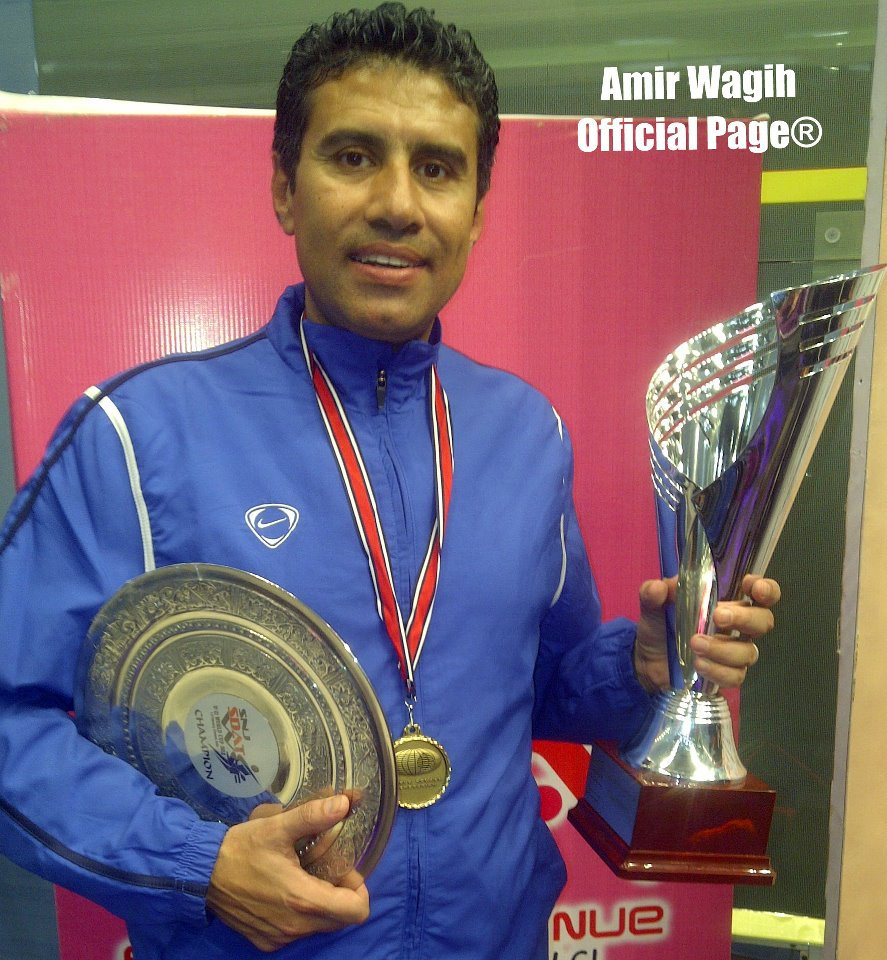
- Amir Wagih after winning World Cup with national team

Personal information
- Nickname: Miro
- Born: Amir Wagih Mohamed; 21 August 1967 (age 58) Cairo, Egypt
- Years active: 15
- Height: 6 ft (183 cm)
- Weight: 182 LBs

Sport
- Country: Egypt
- Handedness: right
- Turned pro: 1987
- Racquet used: tecnifibre
- Highest ranking: 9
- Title: 23+

Amir Wagih Mohamed (امير وجية, born 21 August 1967) is a professional, top squash coach and former professional squash player. He represented Egypt at six World Team Squash Championships from 1989 to 1999. During the 1999 Men's World Team Squash Championships Wagih helped Egypt win the title for the first time.

He is the current head coach of Squash on Fire which is based in Washington, DC. He is also the current head coach of Georgetown University men's and women's squash team. He was the former head coach of the Egyptian squash team. Amir was also the coach of the Kuwaiti national squash team from 2002 to 2006. Amir was the technical director of A.A. Turki Group, also known as ATCO international squash academy, from 2009 to 2010. Amir had his own private academy in Palm Hills, Egypt from 2010 to 2012 before he moved to the United States. He played right-handed and with a Tecnifibre racquet. Amir has acquired 23 world titles as a coach, including several Egyptian and Arab World Champions.

== Experience ==
Head Coach of Squash on Fire and Georgetown University Squash, 2013–Present

Head Coach of Egyptian Squash Federation, 2006-2013

Head Coach of Kuwait Squash Federation, 2002-2006

Head Coach of Egyptian Squash Federation, 1994-2002

== World Titles as Coach ==
World Champion Men Ind., Qatar, December 2012

World Runner-up Men Ind., Qatar, December 2012

World Champion Women's Team, France, November 2012

World Champion BU19 Team, Qatar, July 2012

World Champion GU19 Ind., Qatar, July 2012

World Champion BU19 Ind., Qatar, July 2012

World Junior Champion Ind. - Amr Khaled, Ecuador, 2010

World Junior Runner-Up Ind. - Ali Farag, Ecuador, 2010

World Junior Third Place Ind. - Marawan El Shourbaghy, Ecuador, 2010

World Junior Champion Team, Ecuador, 2010

World Men's Champion Ind. - Amr Shabana, Kuwait, 2009

World Men's Runner-up Ind. - Ramy Ashour, Kuwait, 2009

World Men's Champion Team, Denmark, 2009

World Men's Champion Ind. - Ramy Ashour, England, 2008

World Men's Runner-up Ind. - Karim Darwish, England, 2008

World Men's Champion Team, Bermuda, 2007

World Women's Champion Ind. - Raneem El Walily, Hong Kong, 2007

World Women's Champion Team, Hong Kong, 2007

World Men's Champion Ind. - Ramy Ashour, New Zealand, 2006

World Men's Runner-up Ind. - Omar Mosaad, New Zealand, 2006

World Men's Third Place Ind. - Tarek Moamen, New Zealand, 2006

World Men's Champion Team, New Zealand, 2006
