= Dan Jenson =

Australian squash player

Personal information
- Born: 20 June 1975 (age 51) Brisbane

Sport
- Country: Australia
- Turned pro: 1993
- Retired: 2008

Men's Singles
- Highest ranking: 5 (January 1999)
Medal record
Men's squash
Representing Australia
World Team Championships
Bronze medal – third place	1997 Petaling Jaya	Team
World Doubles Championships
Gold medal – first place	1997 Hong Kong	Mixed doubles
Silver medal – second place	1997 Hong Kong	Doubles
Silver medal – second place	2006 Melbourne	Doubles
Commonwealth Games
Bronze medal – third place	2006 Melbourne	Men's doubles
- Updated on 12 April 2022

Dan Jenson (born 20 June 1975 in Brisbane, Australia) is an Australian former professional squash player. He joined the professional tour in 1993, and reached a career-high world ranking of World No. 5 in 1999. He was considered to be one of the rising stars of the game in the late-1990s, but a series of injuries hampered his progress.

At the inaugural World Doubles Squash Championships in 1997, Jenson won the mixed doubles event (partnering Liz Irving), and finished runner-up in the men's doubles (partnering Craig Rowland). He was also runner-up in the men's doubles at the 2006 championships (partnering Joe Kneipp). At the 2006 Commonwealth Games, Jenson won a bronze medal in the men's doubles (partnering David Palmer).
