= Joseph Kneipp =

Australian squash player (born 1973)

Personal information
- Born: 27 September 1973 (age 52) Brisbane, Australia
- Height: 1.82 m (6 ft 0 in)

Sport
- Country: Australia
- Handedness: Right-Handed
- Turned pro: 1994
- Coached by: Daniel Kneipp
- Retired: 2007

Men's Singles
- Highest ranking: 10 (January 2004)
- World Open: SF (2003)
Medal record
Men's squash
Representing Australia
World Championships
Bronze medal – third place	2003 Lahore	Singles
World Doubles Championships
Gold medal – first place	2006 Melbourne	Mixed doubles
Silver medal – second place	2006 Melbourne	Doubles
Commonwealth Games
Gold medal – first place	2006 Melbourne	Mixed doubles
Bronze medal – third place	2002 Manchester	Mixed doubles
- Updated on 12 April 2022

Joseph "Joe" Kneipp (born 27 September 1973 in Brisbane, Queensland) is an Australian former professional squash player.

Kneipp was born in Brisbane and grew up near Cairns. He began playing squash at the age of seven. As a junior, he won the Australian under-13 squash championship title. At the age of 14, he attended the Australian Institute of Sport for a year. He captained the Australian team which won the world junior team title in 1992.

Kneipp joined the professional circuit in 1994. His career-high world ranking to date is World No. 10 in January 2004. That year, he finished runner-up to Thierry Lincou in the Super Series Finals.

Kneipp won a gold medal in the mixed doubles at the 2006 Commonwealth Games, partnering Natalie Grinham. He also won the mixed doubles title at the 2006 World Doubles Squash Championships, partnering Rachael Grinham.

Since 2002, Joe has been coached by his brother Daniel Kneipp.
