= Sami Elopuro =

Finnish squash player (born 1964)

Personal information
- Born: November 22, 1964 (age 61)

Sport
- Country: Finland
- Coached by: Hannu Mäkinen
- Retired: 1996

Men's singles
- Highest ranking: No. 6 (January 1992)
- Tour final: 4
- Updated on April 2018

Sami Elopuro (born 22 November 1964) is a Finnish former professional squash player, and national champion. He reached a career high of number 6 in the world. He represented Finland internationally, for example at the World Team Championships. As of 2018, he coaches professional players Jami Äijänen and Miko Äijänen.
