= Julien Bonetat =

French squash player (born 1971)

Personal information
- Nickname: Kermitt
- Born: 28 June 1971 (age 55) Tours, France
- Height: 1.74 m (5 ft 9 in)
- Weight: 76 kg (168 lb)

Sport
- Country: France
- Handedness: Right handed
- Turned pro: 1989
- Coached by: Jean-Luc Bonetat and Neil Harvey
- Retired: 2000
- Highest ranking: No. 13 (November 1996)
- Title: 1
- Tour final: 4
- World Open: Round of 16
- Updated on April 2013

Julien Bonetat (born 28 June 1971 in Tours) was a professional squash player who represented France. He reached a career-high world ranking of World No. 13 in November 1996. Bonetat represented France during the 1989 World Team Squash Championships.
