= Ahmed Barada =

Egyptian squash player (born 1977)

Personal information
- Born: 25 April 1977 (age 49) Cairo, Egypt

Sport
- Country: Egypt
- Handedness: Right handed
- Turned pro: 1996
- Retired: 2001

Men's singles
- Highest ranking: No. 2 (December, 1998)
Medal record
Men's squash
Representing Egypt
World Games
Gold medal – first place	1997 Lahti	Singles
World Championships
Silver medal – second place	1999 Giza	Singles
- Updated on August, 2013

Ahmed Barada (born 25 April 1977 in Cairo) is an Egyptian former professional squash player. He finished runner-up at both the World Open and the Super Series Finals in 1999 (losing in both finals to Peter Nicol). His career-high world ranking was World No. 2, which he reached in December 1998.

He represented the winning Egyptian team in the 1999 Men's World Team Squash Championships held in Cairo.

Barada won the World Junior Open squash title in 1994, as well as 4 British Junior Open titles in 1991–94 (1 under-14, 2 under-16, and 1 under-19). He shot to stardom on the professional circuit in 1996, when he became the first wildcard player ever to reach the final of a Professional Squash Association Super Series event, finishing runner-up at the inaugural Al-Ahram International Championship in Cairo.

In 2000, Barada was stabbed twice near the spinal cord by an unknown assailant outside his home in Cairo. Following his recovery from this injury, Barada had a short-lived comeback, before officially announcing his retirement from the game in August 2001.
