= Zarak Jahan Khan =

Pakistani squash player (born 1967)

Zarak Jahan Khan also spelled Zarak Jehan Khan (1 February 1967, Quetta) is a Pakistani Asian Games gold medallist in squash.

His brothers Hiddy Jahan and Zubair Jahan Khan are also both successful professional squash players on the international circuit. His son Shahjahan Khan is a squash professional on the international circuit coached by his father.

== Career ==
Khan represented Pakistan during the 1989 Men's World Team Squash Championships winning a silver medal and four years later he was part of the winning team at the 1993 Men's World Team Squash Championships. He also won the individual title at the 1998 Asian Games in Bangkok, Thailand. His highest world Ranking was 8 (March 1994). Right now (2011), he is working as coach at Cross Courts in Natick, MA. Previously he was at the Seattle Athletic Club, Seattle, United States.
