= Martin Heath =

Scottish squash player (born 1973)

Personal information
- Nationality: British (Scottish)
- Born: 31 January 1973 (age 53) Stirling, Scotland

Sport
- Highest ranking: No.4 (October 1999)
Medal record
Representing Scotland
Men's squash
World Championships
Bronze medal – third place	1999 Giza	singles
European Team Championships
Gold medal – first place	1992 Aix-en-Provence	Team

Martin Heath (born 31 January 1973) is a former professional squash player from Oban, Scotland, who competed at two Commonwealth Games. His career-high ranking was World No.4, which he reached in 1999.

== Biography ==
Aged 19, Heath helped the Scottish men's team win the gold medal at the 1992 European Squash Team Championships in Aix-en-Provence, France.

Heath turned professional in 1994 after graduating from the University of Glasgow. He spent eleven years on the professional tour, including six consecutive years ranked in the world's top 100. In 1996, Heath won the Singapore Open and repeated again in 1997, both times without losing a game. However, it was not until 1998 that Heath made his debut in the top 10 at No. 7 by reaching the final of the Al Ahram International, beating World No. 1 Peter Nicol in the semi-finals. At the time, the Al Ahram event was the largest purse to date at $175,000.

Heath represented the 1998 Scottish team at the 1998 Commonwealth Games in Kuala Lumpur, Malaysia, where he competed in the squash events. His brother David Heath also competed at the Games.

In 1999, Heath reached the semi-finals of the World Open, losing to eventual champion Peter Nicol 3 to 1. In 2000, he finished runner-up at the Tournament of Champions in New York City (beating Peter Nicol in the semi-finals, before losing to Jonathon Power in the final). His last competitive year was 2002 in which he reached the semi-finals of the Pakistan Open and quarter finals at the British Open and World Open. He also went to a second Commonwealth Games after being selected by the 2002 Scottish team at the 2002 Commonwealth Games in Manchester, England, where he competed in the squash events and reached the quarter-fnals of the doubles.

Heath won the Scottish national squash title six times in 1995, 1997, 2001, 2002, 2003 and 2004.

Since retiring as a player in 2004, Heath has worked as a coach, performance director and sports journalist, writing a column for Squash Magazine and commentating on many PSA tour events as color and lead commentator, including the Commonwealth Games in 2014, BBC, TSN, ESPN & CBC. Heath was the Head Squash Coach for the University of Rochester men's varsity squash team, the "Yellowjackets". Heath led the team from a pre-season intercollegiate (CSA) ranking of No. 28 in 2005 to No. 1 in 2016. The Yellowjackets reached the semi-finals of the CSA National Championships in 2009, 2010 and 2011 and the final in 2016, losing narrowly to Yale after defeating Trinity College in the semi-finals.

As a consultant Heath took on Head Coach and Performance Director roles with the US National Teams, Scottish Teams, Canadian Teams and briefly with the Chinese National Teams, helping lead his teams to many international titles and medals, most notably the Men's World Doubles Championships in 2017.

Heath currently plays a role as Head Squash Professional at the renowned Cambridge Club in Toronto, Canada, where he resides with his son, Kamren.
