= Danny Meddings =

English squash player (born 1968)

Personal information
- Born: 25 June 1968 (age 58) Greater London, Surrey, England

Sport
- Country: England

Men's singles
- Highest ranking: No. 12 (November 1994)
Medal record
Men's squash
Representing England
European Team Championships
Gold medal – first place	1997 Odense	Team

Daniel Meddings (born 25 June 1968) is a former English professional squash player. He reached a world ranking of 12 in November 1994.

== Biography ==
Meddings was born in Greater London, Surrey and represented his county and country and competed in the British Open Squash Championships throughout the 1990s. He represented England at International level.

Meddings won a gold medal for the England men's national squash team at the 1997 European Squash Team Championships in Odense.
