= Chris Walker (squash player) =

English squash player and coach

Personal information
- Nationality: British (English)
- Born: 11 June 1967 (age 59) Chelmsford, Essex, England
- Height: 180 cm (5 ft 11 in)

Sport
- Highest ranking: 4 (November 1996)
Medal record
Men's squash
Representing England
World Championships
Bronze medal – third place	1993 Karachi	singles
Bronze medal – third place	1996 Lahore	singles
World Team Championships
Gold medal – first place	1995 Cairo	Team
Gold medal – first place	1997 Petaling Jaya	Team
Silver medal – second place	1991 Helsinki	Team
Bronze medal – third place	1993 Karachi	Team
Bronze medal – third place	1999 Cairo	Team
Bronze medal – third place	2001 Melbourne	Team
World Doubles Championships
Gold medal – first place	1997 Hong Kong	Doubles
Silver medal – second place	1997 Hong Kong	Mixed doubles
Commonwealth Games
Bronze medal – third place	1998 Kuala Lumpur	Doubles
Bronze medal – third place	2002 Manchester	Mixed doubles
European Team Championships
Gold medal – first place	1989 Helsinki	Team
Gold medal – first place	1990 Zurich	Team
Gold medal – first place	1991 Gelsenkirchen	Team
Bronze medal – third place	1992 Aix-en-Provence	Team
Gold medal – first place	1993 Aix-en-Provence	Team
Gold medal – first place	1995 Amsterdam	Team
Gold medal – first place	1996 Amsterdam	Team
Gold medal – first place	1998 Espoo	Team
Gold medal – first place	1999 Linz	Team
Gold medal – first place	2002 Böblingen	Team

Christopher Ian Walker (born 11 June 1967) is a male squash coach and former professional squash player from England.

== Biography ==
Walker started playing squash when he was eight years old. At 18 years old he took a job as a computer programmer but decided to devote his time to squash, selling his car to finance playing on the World Squash tour. At that time it was called the ISPA (International Squash Players Association) since renamed, and currently, the PSA (Professional Squash Association) tour. He reached a career high world ranking of 4.

He was ranked second in Britain in August 1993 and joined Cardiff-based Leekes Wizards along with fellow England international Tony Hands.

He reached the semi-finals of the 1993 Men's World Open Squash Championship and the 1996 Men's World Open Squash Championship. He represented England in the 1991 Men's World Team Squash Championships (finishing runner-up) and the 1993 Men's World Team Squash Championships (third place) In addition he was twice a winning team member in the WSF World Team Squash Championships (1995 & 1997). He also won the inaugural World Squash Doubles Championships (with Mark Cairns) in 1997 and was a three-time European Individual champion in 1990, 1992 and 1993.

He represented England at the 1998 Commonwealth Games in Kuala Lumpur, Malaysia and won a bronze medal in the men's doubles with Mark Cairns. Four years later he won another bronze medal in the mixed doubles at the 2002 Commonwealth Games with Fiona Geaves.

He finished runner-up at the British Open in 2001 and is currently the only person to have ever made it to the final of the event having played through the qualifying draw. He was England captain and earned over 70 caps.

Walker won nine gold medals for the England men's national squash team at the European Squash Team Championships from 1989 to 2002.

== Coaching and management ==
- 1992–1999, co-founder and eventual manager of the British Squash Professionals Association
- 1993, Tournament Promoter of the Lancaster Rover Colchester Open, a World Ranking PSA event in Colchester, Essex
- 1993–1995, Board Member and Vice President of the Professional Squash Association (PSA)
- 1998–2004, Partner with Peter Nicol presenting squash exhibition matches and clinics around the United States to club players and juniors
- 2000–2002, Board Member of Manchester Commonwealth Games – involved at National level of the UK Competitors Association
- 2001, Moved to Greenwich, Connecticut, from London to begin coaching
- 2001–2005, Author of 50 coaching articles for a monthly page in Squash Magazine (USA)
- 2004–2013, Men's US National Team CoachChampionships and Pan American games
- 2005, Co-Founder/Director of San Diego's Urban Squash Program now called Access Youth Academy
- 2007, Coach of US Men's and Women's US National Squash Team to the Pan Am Games in Rio de Janeiro
- 2005–2008, Founding partner of San Diego Squash
- {{year needed}}, Coaching for the Spence School Varsity and JV team in Manhattan
- 2010–2013, CEO and Founder of Motion Sport Gear
- 2011, Team Leader/Manager and Coach Men's and Women's US National Squash team to the Pan American Games in Guadalajara, Mexico
- 2012–2013, Head Coach Girl's Varsity Squash Team at Hackley School, Tarrytown, New York
- 2012–2014, Manager of the Squash Club program at Poly Prep Country Day school in Brooklyn, New York

== Hardball squash ==
- 2007 St. Louis and Maryland Club Open champion (with Clive Leach);
- 2006 Tavern Club Invitational and 2007 Hashim Khan Invitational champion (with Viktor Berg);
- Ranked world No. 1 on the pro doubles tour in autumn 2007 (with Clive Leach);
- 2006 North American Open and Kellner Cup finalist with Viktor Berg;
- 2009 Jim Bentley Cup finalist (with Clive Leach),
- 2009 U. S. Pro Challenger champion with Mark Chaloner;
- 2011 National hardball singles champion and ISDA Players Championship.
- 2011 and 2013 US National Hardball Singles Champion

== Family ==
His wife Nayelly Hernández whose nationality is Mexican is also a professional squash player and currently runs a company called Squash Solutions, teaching juniors out of several different locations in the New York and Connecticut area.
