= Nick Taylor (squash player) =

English squash player and coach

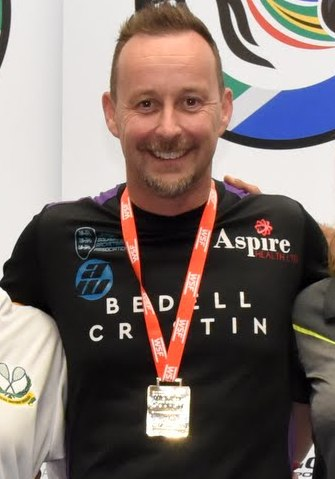
- Nick Taylor 2016

Personal information
- Born: 1971 (age 54–55) Oldham, England

Sport
- Country: England

Men's singles
- Highest ranking: No. 14 (January 2001)
Medal record
Men's squash
Representing England
European Team Championships
| Gold medal – first place | 1997 Odense | Team |
| Gold medal – first place | 2001 Eindhoven | Team |

Nick Taylor (born 1971) is a former professional squash player for England and current squash coach in the United States. He reached a career-high world ranking of World No. 14 and England No. 3 in January 2001.

== Biography ==
Taylor was runner-up at 1996 and 2001 British National Squash Championships.

Taylor won two gold medals for the England men's national squash team at the European Squash Team Championships in 1997 and 2001.

Taylor has won the Over 35's British Open and Closed Squash Championships and was the director of squash for Jersey in the Channel Islands from 2008 to 2017. In 2018, he won his first World Masters Squash Championships title.

Taylor is currently the Director of Squash at Cross Courts in Natick, Massachusetts. Before, he was the Director of INFINITUM Squash in Sudbury, Massachusetts in the United States.
