= Stephen Meads =

English squash player

Steve Meads
Personal information
- Born: Q2. 1970 Reading, England

Sport
- Country: England
- Handedness: Right-handed
- Retired: November 2003
- Highest ranking: No. 11 (November 1995)
- Title: 10
Medal record
Men's squash
Representing England
European Team Championships
Gold medal – first place	1994 Zoetermeer	Team
Gold medal – first place	1996 Amsterdam	Team
Gold medal – first place	1997 Odense	Team

Stephen Andrew Meads (born Q2. 1970) is an English former professional squash player. He reached a career high ranking of 11 in the world during November 1995.

== Biography ==
Meads born in Reading, England, represented Berkshire at county level and was selected for the British U16 team in 1986, a year that he also won the U16 British Open. He became a resident professional at the Sindleshams Squash Club.

Meads was a member of the England men's national squash team that won the gold medal at the European Squash Team Championships in 1994, 1996 and 1997.

In 1995, Meads became British national champion after defeating Nick Taylor in the final. In November of the same year he reached his highest world ranking of 11, following a final appearance in the Calcutta Classic and a quarter final appearance at the British Open.

Meads coached the Hong Kong national team and as of 2021 coached at the Wellinton College and St Georges Hill tennis and Squash Club.
