= Anthony Hill (squash player) =

Australian squash player (born 1969)

Personal information
- Born: 9 June 1969 (age 57) Australia

Sport
- Country: Australia
- Handedness: Right-Handed
- Highest ranking: 5 (December 1999)
Medal record
Men's squash
Representing Australia
World Championships
Bronze medal – third place	1995 Nicosia	Singles
Bronze medal – third place	1998 Doha	Singles

Anthony Hill (born 9 June 1969 in Australia) is an Australian squash player. He reached a career-high world ranking of World No. 5 in December 1999.
