= Mark Cairns (squash player) =

English squash player (born 1967)

Personal information
- Nationality: British (English)
- Born: 21 June 1967 (age 59) Oxford, England

Sport

Men's singles
- Highest ranking: No. 10 (July 1995)
Medal record
Men's squash
Representing England
World Team Championships
Bronze medal – third place	1999 Cairo	Team
World Doubles Championships
Gold medal – first place	1997 Hong Kong	Doubles
Commonwealth Games
Bronze medal – third place	1998 Kuala Lumpur	Doubles
European Team Championships
Gold medal – first place	1995 Amsterdam	Team
Gold medal – first place	1996 Amsterdam	Team
Gold medal – first place	1997 Odense	Team

Mark Cairns (born 21 June 1967) is a male former professional squash player from England. He reached a career-high world ranking of World No. 10 in 1995.

== Biography ==
In 1997 Cairns won the British National Squash Championships and teamed-up with Chris Walker to win the men's doubles title at the inaugural World Squash Doubles Championships. Cairns and Walker also teamed-up for England in the men's doubles at the 1998 Commonwealth Games in Kuala Lumpur, winning a bronze medal.

In 1999 he helped England win a bronze medal at the 1999 Men's World Team Squash Championships after the team defeated Australia in the third place play-off.

Cairns won three consecutive gold medals for the England men's national squash team at the European Squash Team Championships from 1995 to 1997.

== Personal life ==
Mark currently lives in Oxfordshire, and works in property management. He has two children and lives with his wife.
