= Derek Ryan (squash player) =

Irish squash player (born 1969)

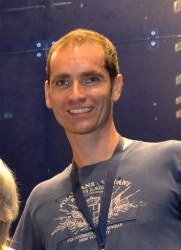
- Ryan in 2012

Personal information
- Born: 10 December 1969 (age 56) Dublin, Ireland

Sport
- Turned pro: 1993
- Retired: Yes
- Racquet used: Dunlop

Men's singles
- Highest ranking: No. 7 (July 1999)
Medal record
Men's squash
Representing Ireland
World Games
| Silver medal – second place | 1997 Lahti | Individual |
Irish Championships
| Gold medal – first place | 1993–85, 1995–2000, 2003, 2012 | singles |

Derek Ryan (born 10 December 1969) is an Irish squash player who at the peak of his career rose to No. 7 in the world rankings, and for many years was the Irish men's number 1 player. He won nine Irish national titles from 1993 to 2012.

== Biography ==
Ryan was born on 10 December 1969, in Dublin. He began playing squash along with his brother Noel, as his parents both played. Living in Killiney he played at various local clubs including Squash Ireland and from the age of 14 he played league squash with Sandycove TSC. Ryan was ranked first in Ireland by the age of 19. He completed his school leaving certificate and decided to study accountancy, which he discontinued after a year. Aged 19 he decided to play professionally and in 1991 he moved to Manchester in England.

Ryan won his first national title in 1993 after defeating his great rival Willie Hosey. He represented Ireland at the World Squash Team Championships.

After a successful international career as a professional player, including appearing a record 188 times for the Ireland men's national squash team , Ryan retired from the professional circuit in 2002. He continued to play national squash with Fitzwilliam, the Irish champions at the time, and studied physiotherapy at the University of Salford, practicing as a physiotherapist in Dublin.

In 2008, Ryan played the then current world number 2 Grégory Gaultier in his testimonial match. He later reached 200 caps for his country, and in December 2012, he won his ninth and last national title, placing him just one win the record of 10 set by Willie Hosey.
