= Simon Parke =

English squash player

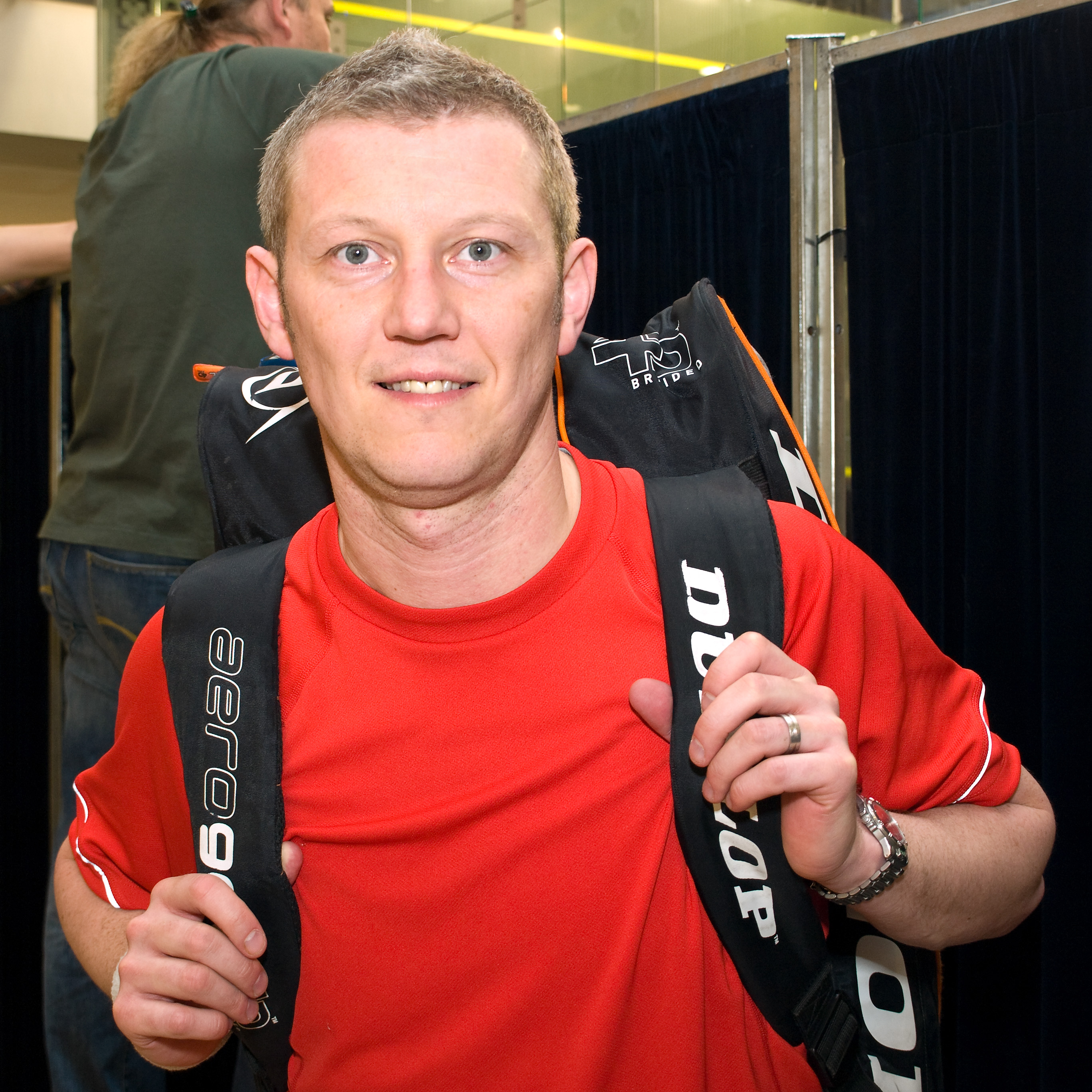
- Simon Parke in April 2011

Personal information
- Nationality: British (English)
- Born: 10 August 1972 (age 53) Oakham, England
- Height: 1.81 m (5 ft 11 in)

Sport
- Turned pro: 1988
- Retired: 2006
- Racquet used: Dunlop Hot Melt Pro
- Highest ranking: No. 3 (October 2000)
Medal record
Men's squash
Representing England
Commonwealth Games
Silver medal – second place	1998 Kuala Lumpur	Mixed doubles
European Team Championships
Gold medal – first place	1990 Zurich	Team
Gold medal – first place	1991 Gelsenkirchen	Team
Gold medal – first place	1993 Aix-en-Provence	Team
Gold medal – first place	1995 Amsterdam	Team
Gold medal – first place	1998 Helsinki	Team
Gold medal – first place	1999 Linz	Team
Gold medal – first place	2000 Vienna	Team
Gold medal – first place	2001 Eindhoven	Team
Gold medal – first place	2003 Nottingham	Team
Gold medal – first place	2005 Amsterdam	Team

Simon Armour Parke (born 10 August 1972) is a former professional squash player from England. He reached a career-high world ranking of World No. 3 in October 2000.

== Biography ==
Parke won the World Junior Squash Championship title in 1990. As a professional player, he broke into the world's top-20 in 1991, and the top-10 in 1995. He was diagnosed with testicular cancer in December 1995, and underwent surgery in January 1996, followed by treatment which included chemotherapy. He returned to the professional squash circuit four months after his surgery.

Parke was part of the England team that won the 1995 Men's World Team Squash Championships and 1997 Men's World Team Squash Championships. He also won the British National Championships in 1998 and the US Open title in 1999. He also represented England and won a silver medal in the mixed doubles, at the 1998 Commonwealth Games in Kuala Lumpur.

Parke won ten gold medals for the England men's national squash team at the European Squash Team Championships from 1990 to 2005.

In 2012 Parke started coaching squash at Chaple Allerton in Leeds.

Parke currently teaches at Leeds University, predominantly teaching the 'improvers' squad.
