= Peter Nicol =

Scottish squash player (born 1973)

Peter Nicol MBE
Personal information
- Nickname: The Boss
- Born: 5 April 1973 (age 53) Inverurie, Scotland
- Height: 1.80 m (5 ft 11 in)

Sport
- Country: England; Scotland (until March 2001)
- Handedness: Left handed
- Turned pro: 1994
- Coached by: Neil Harvey
- Retired: 2006
- Racquet used: Prince

Men's singles
- Highest ranking: No. 1 (February 1998)
- Title: 52
- Tour final: 69
- World Open: W (1999)
Medal record
Men's squash
Representing Great Britain
World Games
Gold medal – first place	2005 Duisburg	Singles
Representing England
World Championships
Bronze medal – third place	2002 Antwerp	Singles
Bronze medal – third place	2005 Hong Kong	Singles
Commonwealth Games
Gold medal – first place	2002 Manchester	Doubles
Gold medal – first place	2006 Melbourne	Singles
Gold medal – first place	2006 Melbourne	Doubles
Silver medal – second place	2002 Manchester	Singles
Representing Scotland
World Championships
Gold medal – first place	1999 Giza	Singles
Silver medal – second place	1997 Petaling Jaya	Singles
Silver medal – second place	1998 Doha	Singles
Bronze medal – third place	1994 Barcelona	Singles
Bronze medal – third place	1996 Lahore	Singles
Commonwealth Games
Gold medal – first place	1998 Kuala Lumpur	Singles
Bronze medal – third place	1998 Kuala Lumpur	Doubles
- Updated on 19 September 2010

Peter Nicol MBE (born 5 April 1973) is a former professional squash player from Scotland, who represented first Scotland and then England in international squash. In 1998, while still competing for Scotland, he became the first player from the UK since Jonah Barrington to hold the World No. 1 ranking. During his career, he won one World Open title, two British Open titles, and four Commonwealth Games gold medals. He is considered to be one of the leading international squash players of his time.

== Biography ==
Nicol was born in Inverurie, Aberdeenshire. During his career, Nicol was well known for his retrieving game, as well as being a tough competitor. His rivalry with the Canadian player Jonathon Power was amongst the most famous and protracted in the history of squash.

Nicol was ranked World No. 1 for a total of 60 months during his career, including a continuous 24-month stint in 2002–2003.

After finishing runner-up at the World Open in 1997 and 1998, Nicol won the title in 1999, beating Ahmed Barada of Egypt in the final 15–9, 15–13, 15–11. He continued to hold the title of "world champion" through to 2002 as the men's World Open was not held in 2000 or 2001 due to difficulties in securing sponsorship for the event.

After initially representing Scotland in international squash, Nicol switched his representation to England in 2001, claiming that he felt he was not receiving sufficient support from Scottish Squash, the national governing body. Some resented this switch, even going so far as calling it traitorous, suggesting it was rooted in financial gain.

Nicol enjoyed considerable success at the Commonwealth Games, where squash became a medal sport in 1998. In 1998, representing Scotland, he won a men's singles Gold Medal (beating Jonathon Power in the final), and a men's doubles Bronze Medal. Nicol represented the 2002 England team at the 2002 Commonwealth Games in Manchester, England. He competed in the singles and doubles, winning the silver medal in the singles and the gold medal in the doubles partnering Lee Beachill.

In 2006, again representing England, Nicol won another men's singles gold medal (beating Australia's David Palmer in the final), and another men's doubles gold medal (partnering Beachill again).

Other career highlights included winning three consecutive Super Series Finals titles (1999–2001), two PSA Masters titles (2000 & 2004), three Tournament of Champions titles (2001 & 2003-4), and two British National Championship titles (1996 & 2003). He also won four consecutive gold medals for the England men's national squash team at the European Squash Team Championships from 2003 to 2006.

== Retirement ==
In July 2006, Nicol announced that he would be retiring after the 2006 World Open in September. Nicol's final match was a loss to Thierry Lincou in the quarter-finals.

Nicol turned his focus to promoting the game, providing sponsorship, support and coaching through his rackets company Nicol, and promoting events worldwide through Event is Sports Marketing Ltd. Following a move to the United States, he set up the Nicol Champions Academy in New York and co-founded SquashSkills, an online coaching resource aimed at delivering squash coaching from many of the world's top players.

Peter and his wife Jessica Winstanely now own and operate Nicol Squash club in New York and Nicol Rackets in New Jersey, a 20,000 square foot multi-rackets club that houses 4 padel courts, three squash courts, and one pickleball court, and are continuing to expand in the racket sports space.

== World Open final appearances ==
Wins (1)
Year	Opponent in final	Score in final
1999	Ahmed Barada	15–9, 15–13, 15–11
Runners-up (2)
Year	Opponent in final	Score in final
1997	Rodney Eyles	15–11, 15–12, 15–12
1998	Jonathon Power	15–17, 15–7, 15–9, 15–10

== British Open final appearances ==
Wins (2)
Year	Opponent in final	Score in final
1998	Jansher Khan	17–16, 15–4, 15–5
2002	John White	15–9, 15–8, 15–8
Runners-up (3)
Year	Opponent in final	Score in final
1997	Jansher Khan	17–15, 9–15, 15–12, 8–15, 15–8
1999	Jonathon Power	15–17, 15–12 (retired)
2003	David Palmer	15–13, 15–13, 15–8

== Commonwealth Games final appearances ==
Wins (2)
Year	Opponent in final	Score in final
1998	Jonathon Power	3–9, 9–2, 9–1, 2–9, 9–2
2006	David Palmer	9–5, 10–8, 4–9, 9–2
Runners-up (1)
Year	Opponent in final	Score in final
2002	Jonathon Power	9–4, 4–9, 9–3, 9–0

Nicol also won men's doubles Gold Medals at the Commonwealth Games in 2002 and 2006 (partnering Lee Beachill on both occasions).

Sporting positions
Preceded by Jansher Khan; Jonathon Power; Jonathon Power; Jonathon Power; David Palmer; John White	World No. 1 February 1998 – April 1999; October 1999; February 2000 – March 2001; August 1999; January 2002 – December 2003; May 2004 – September 2004	Succeeded by Jonathon Power; Jonathon Power; Jonathon Power; David Palmer; Thierry Lincou; Lee Beachill
