= 2007 Men's World Team Squash Championships =

Men's World Team 2007
- 21st WSF World Men's Team Championship
- Location: Chennai, India
- Date: 6–12 December 2007
- Teams: 29 (from all the 5 confederations)
- Website www.squashsite.co.uk/mwt07.htm

Results
- Champions: England
- Runners-up: Australia
- Third place: France

The 2007 Men's World Team Squash Championships is the men's edition of the 2007 World Team Squash Championships organized by the World Squash Federation, which serves as the world team championship for squash players. The event were held in Chennai, India, and took place from 6 to 12 December 2007. The tournament was organized by the World Squash Federation and the Squash Rackets Federation of India.

The England team won their fourth World Team Championships beating the Australian team in the final.

== Participating teams ==
A total of 29 teams competed from all the five confederations: Africa, America, Asia, Europe and Oceania. For Chinese Taipei, Sri Lanka and Venezuela it was their first participation at a world team championship.

| Africa (SFA) | America (FPS) | Asia (ASF) | Europe (ESF) | Oceania (OSF) | Map |
| Egypt; Kenya; South Africa | Bermuda; Canada; United States; Venezuela | Chinese Taipei; Hong Kong; India (Host Country); Japan; Kuwait; Malaysia; Pakistan; Sri Lanka | Austria; England (Title Holder); France; Finland; Germany; Ireland; Netherlands; Russia; Scotland; Spain; Sweden; Wales | Australia; New Zealand | Map of the participating nations |

== Seeds ==
1. Egypt (semifinals)
2. England (champion)
3. France (semifinals)
4. Australia (final)
5. Malaysia (quarterfinals)
6. Canada (quarterfinals)
7. Pakistan (round of 16)
8. Netherlands (quarterfinals)
9. Wales (round of 16)
10. India (quarterfinals)
11. (Republic of Ireland) Ireland (round of 16)
12. South Africa (quarterfinals)
13. New Zealand (round of 16)
14. United States (round of 16)
15. Hong Kong (round of 16)
16. Germany (round of 16)

== Squads ==
Egypt

- Amr Shabana
- Karim Darwish
- Wael El Hindi
- Mohammed Abbas

Germany

- Simon Rösner
- Tim Weber
- Moritz Dahmen
- Johannes Voit

Finland

- Olli Tuominen
- Matias Tuomi
- Henrik Mustonen
- not held

Russia

- Alexei Severinov
- Valery Litvinko
- Sergey Kostrykin
- not held

England

- Nick Matthew
- James Willstrop
- Lee Beachill
- Peter Barker

Hong Kong

- Dick Lau
- Wei Hang Wong
- Max Lee
- Anson Kwong

Spain

- Borja Golán
- David Vidal
- Alejandro Garbi
- Arturo Tomas

France

- Grégory Gaultier
- Thierry Lincou
- Renan Lavigne
- Julien Balbo

United States

- Julian Illingworth
- Chris Gordon
- Jamie Crombie
- Richard Chin

Japan

- Jun Matsumoto
- Takanori Shimizu
- Yuta Fukui
- Ken Okada

Venezuela

- Francisco Valecillo
- Luis Hernandez
- Richard Prieto
- Juan Pablo Sanchez

Australia

- David Palmer
- Stewart Boswell
- Cameron Pilley
- Scott Arnold

New Zealand

- Kashif Shuja
- Campbell Grayson
- Martin Knight
- Josh Greenfield

Scotland

- Alan Clyne
- Harry Leitch
- Stuart Crawford
- Jamie Macauley

Malaysia

- Mohd Azlan Iskandar
- Ong Beng Hee
- Mohd Nafiizwan Adnan
- Muhd Asyraf Azan

South Africa

- Steve Coppinger
- Adrian Hansen
- Jesse Engelbrecht
- Clinton Leeuw

Kuwait

- Bader Al-Hussaini
- Abdullah Al Muzayen
- Mohammed Hajeyah
- Nasser Al Ramezi

Sri Lanka

- Saman Tilakaratne
- Navin Samarasingh
- Anura Hewage
- Kavinda Cooray

Canada

- Jonathon Power
- Shahier Razik
- Matthew Giuffre
- Shawn Delierre

(Republic of Ireland) Ireland

- Liam Kenny
- John Rooney
- Derek Ryan
- Arthur Gaskin

Austria

- Aqeel Rehman
- Jakob Dirnberger
- Andreas Freudensprung
- Stefan Brauneis

Pakistan

- Aamir Atlas Khan
- Mansoor Zaman
- Farhan Mehboob
- Yasir Butt

India

- Saurav Ghosal
- Ritwik Bhattacharya
- Siddharth Suchde
- Gaurav Nandrajog

Kenya

- Hardeep Reel
- Rajdeep Bains
- Hartaj Bains
- Otto Kwach

Bermuda

- Chase Toogood
- Melrindo Caines
- Robert Maycock
- not held

Netherlands

- Laurens Jan Anjema
- Dylan Bennett
- Tom Hoevenaars
- Piëdro Schweertman

Wales

- Alex Gough
- David Evans
- Jethro Binns
- Rob Sutherland

Sweden

- Christian Drakenberg
- Rasmus Hult
- Gustav Detter
- Badr Abdel Aziz

Chinese Taipei

- Chung-Yu Chang
- Hsuen-Chih Huang
- Kai-Han Chuang
- Ching-Han Chen

== Group stage results ==
=== Pool A ===
| Egypt | 3 | - | 0 | Finland |
| Germany | 3 | - | 0 | Russia |

| Egypt | 3 | - | 0 | Germany |
| Finland | 3 | - | 0 | Russia |

| Egypt | 3 | - | 0 | Russia |
| Germany | 2 | - | 1 | Finland |

| Rank | Nation | Match | Won | Lost | Points |
|---|---|---|---|---|---|
| 1 | Egypt | 3 | 3 | 0 | 6 |
| 2 | Germany | 3 | 2 | 1 | 4 |
| 3 | Finland | 3 | 1 | 2 | 2 |
| 4 | Russia | 3 | 0 | 3 | 0 |

=== Pool B ===
| Hong Kong | 2 | - | 1 | Spain |

| England | 3 | - | 0 | Spain |

| England | 3 | - | 0 | Hong Kong |

| Rank | Nation | Match | Won | Lost | Points |
|---|---|---|---|---|---|
| 1 | England | 2 | 2 | 0 | 4 |
| 2 | Hong Kong | 2 | 1 | 1 | 2 |
| 3 | Spain | 2 | 0 | 2 | 0 |

=== Pool C ===
| France | 3 | - | 0 | Japan |
| United States | 3 | - | 0 | Venezuela |

| France | 3 | - | 0 | United States |
| Japan | 3 | - | 0 | Venezuela |

| France | 3 | - | 0 | Venezuela |
| United States | 3 | - | 0 | Japan |

| Rank | Nation | Match | Won | Lost | Points |
|---|---|---|---|---|---|
| 1 | France | 3 | 3 | 0 | 6 |
| 2 | United States | 3 | 2 | 1 | 4 |
| 3 | Japan | 3 | 1 | 2 | 2 |
| 4 | Venezuela | 3 | 0 | 3 | 0 |

=== Pool D ===
| New Zealand | 3 | - | 0 | Scotland |

| Australia | 3 | - | 0 | Scotland |

| Australia | 3 | - | 0 | New Zealand |

| Rank | Nation | Match | Won | Lost | Points |
|---|---|---|---|---|---|
| 1 | Australia | 2 | 2 | 0 | 4 |
| 2 | New Zealand | 2 | 1 | 1 | 2 |
| 3 | Scotland | 2 | 0 | 2 | 0 |

=== Pool E ===
| Malaysia | 3 | - | 0 | Kuwait |
| South Africa | 3 | - | 0 | Sri Lanka |

| Malaysia | 2 | - | 1 | South Africa |
| Kuwait | 3 | - | 0 | Sri Lanka |

| Malaysia | 3 | - | 0 | Sri Lanka |
| South Africa | 2 | - | 1 | Kuwait |

| Rank | Nation | Match | Won | Lost | Points |
|---|---|---|---|---|---|
| 1 | Malaysia | 3 | 3 | 0 | 6 |
| 2 | South Africa | 3 | 2 | 1 | 4 |
| 3 | Kuwait | 3 | 1 | 2 | 2 |
| 4 | Sri Lanka | 3 | 0 | 3 | 0 |

=== Pool F ===
| (Republic of Ireland) Ireland | 3 | - | 0 | Austria |

| Canada | 3 | - | 0 | Austria |

| Canada | 2 | - | 1 | (Republic of Ireland) Ireland |

| Rank | Nation | Match | Won | Lost | Points |
|---|---|---|---|---|---|
| 1 | Canada | 2 | 2 | 0 | 4 |
| 2 | (Republic of Ireland) Ireland | 2 | 1 | 1 | 2 |
| 3 | Austria | 2 | 0 | 2 | 0 |

=== Pool G ===
| Pakistan | 3 | - | 0 | Kenya |
| India | 3 | - | 0 | Bermuda |

| Pakistan | 3 | - | 0 | India |
| Kenya | 3 | - | 0 | Bermuda |

| Pakistan | 3 | - | 0 | Bermuda |
| India | 3 | - | 0 | Kenya |

| Rank | Nation | Match | Won | Lost | Points |
|---|---|---|---|---|---|
| 1 | Pakistan | 3 | 3 | 0 | 6 |
| 2 | India | 3 | 2 | 1 | 4 |
| 3 | Kenya | 3 | 1 | 2 | 2 |
| 4 | Bermuda | 3 | 0 | 3 | 0 |

=== Pool H ===
| Netherlands | 3 | - | 0 | Sweden |
| Wales | | - | | Chinese Taipei |

| Netherlands | 1 | - | 2 | Wales |
| Sweden | 3 | - | 0 | Chinese Taipei |

| Netherlands | 3 | - | 0 | Chinese Taipei |
| Wales | 3 | - | 0 | Sweden |

| Rank | Nation | Match | Won | Lost | Points |
|---|---|---|---|---|---|
| 1 | Wales | 3 | 3 | 0 | 6 |
| 2 | Netherlands | 3 | 2 | 1 | 4 |
| 3 | Sweden | 3 | 1 | 2 | 2 |
| 4 | Chinese Taipei | 3 | 0 | 3 | 0 |

== Finals ==
=== Draw ===
Round of 16
1 | Egypt | 3 | 3 | 2
15 | Hong Kong | 0 | 0 | 0
9 | Wales | 0 | 1 | 1
10 | India | 3 | 3 | 2
4 | Australia | 3 | 3 | 2
14 | United States | 0 | 0 | 1
6 | Canada | 3 | 3 | 1
12 | South Africa | 0 | 0 | 2
11 | (Republic of Ireland) Ireland | 2 | 0 | 2
5 | Malaysia | 3 | 3 | 1
13 | New Zealand | 0 | 0 | 1
3 | France | 3 | 3 | 2
8 | Netherlands | 3 | 3 | 0
7 | Pakistan | 1 | 0 | 2
16 | Germany | 0 | 0 | 0
2 | England | 3 | 3 | 3

Quarterfinals
1 | Egypt | 3 | 3 | 2
10 | India | 0 | 0 | 0
4 | Australia | 3 | 3 | 2
6 | Canada | 0 | 1 | 0
5 | Malaysia | 0 | 1 | 1
3 | France | 3 | 3 | 2
8 | Netherlands | 1 | 0 | 0
2 | England | 3 | 3 | 2

Semifinals
1 | Egypt | 3 | 1 | 1
4 | Australia | 1 | 3 | 3
3 | France | 0 | 0 | 2
2 | England | 3 | 3 | 0

Final
4 | Australia | 3 | 0 | 0
2 | England | 2 | 3 | 3

Third place match
| 1 | Egypt | 1 | 1 |
| 3 | France | 3 | 3 |

=== Results ===
==== Quarter-finals ====
Egypt
3
QUARTER FINAL
Chennai, India
10 December 2007
Glass Court

India
0

| | | | 1 | 2 | 3 | 4 | 5 |
|---|---|---|---|---|---|---|---|
| 1 | (Egypt) (India) | N°2 Wael El Hindi; N°2 Ritwik Bhattacharya | 13; 11 | 11; 4 | 11; 8 |
| 2 | (Egypt) (India) | N°1 Amr Shabana; N°1 Saurav Ghosal | 11; 5 | 11; 8 | 11; 9 |
| 3 | (Egypt) (India) | N°3 Mohammed Abbas; N°3 Siddarth Suchde | 11; 6 | 11; 8 |

Australia
3
QUARTER FINAL
Chennai, India
10 December 2007
Glass Court

Canada
0

| | | | 1 | 2 | 3 | 4 | 5 |
|---|---|---|---|---|---|---|---|
| 1 | (Australia) (Canada) | N°2 Stewart Boswell; N°2 Matthew Giuffre | 11; 4 | 11; 8 | 11; 4 |
| 2 | (Australia) (Canada) | N°1 David Palmer; N°1 Shahier Razik | 10; 12 | 11; 7 | 11; 6 | 11; 6 |
| 3 | (Australia) (Canada) | N°3 Cameron Pilley; N°3 Shawn Delierre | 11; 3 | 11; 7 |

Malaysia
0
QUARTER FINAL
Chennai, India
10 December 2007
Glass Court

France
3

| | | | 1 | 2 | 3 | 4 | 5 |
|---|---|---|---|---|---|---|---|
| 1 | (Malaysia) (France) | N°2 Ong Beng Hee; N°2 Thierry Lincou | 9; 11 | 6; 11 | 10; 12 |
| 2 | (Malaysia) (France) | N°1 Mohd Azlan Iskandar; N°1 Grégory Gaultier | 8; 11 | 7; 11 | 11; 9 | 7; 11 |
| 3 | (Malaysia) (France) | N°3 Muhd Asyraf Azan; N°3 Renan Lavigne | 8; 11 | 12; 10 | 5; 11 |

Netherlands
0
QUARTER FINAL
Chennai, India
10 December 2007
Glass Court

England
3

| | | | 1 | 2 | 3 | 4 | 5 |
|---|---|---|---|---|---|---|---|
| 1 | (Netherlands) (England) | N°2 Tom Hoevenaars; N°2 James Willstrop | 6; 11 | 7; 11 | 11; 9 | 8; 11 |
| 2 | (Netherlands) (England) | N°1 Laurens Jan Anjema; N°1 Nick Matthew | 6; 11 | 6; 11 | 9; 11 |
| 3 | (Netherlands) (England) | N°3 Piëdro Schweertman; N°3 Peter Barker | 4; 11 | 2; 11 |

==== Semi-finals ====
Egypt
1
SEMI FINAL
Chennai, India
11 December 2007
Glass Court

Australia
2

| | | | 1 | 2 | 3 | 4 | 5 |
|---|---|---|---|---|---|---|---|
| 1 | (Egypt) (Australia) | N°3 Mohammed Abbas; N°3 Cameron Pilley | 7; 11 | 11; 7 | 11; 4 | 11; 8 |
| 2 | (Egypt) (Australia) | N°1 Amr Shabana; N°1 David Palmer | 8; 11 | 6; 11 | 11; 6 | 6; 11 |
| 3 | (Egypt) (Australia) | N°2 Karim Darwish; N°2 Stewart Boswell | 7; 11 | 11; 7 | 9; 11 | 8; 11 |

France
1
SEMI FINAL
Chennai, India
11 December 2007
Glass Court

England
2

| | | | 1 | 2 | 3 | 4 | 5 |
|---|---|---|---|---|---|---|---|
| 1 | (France) (England) | N°3 Peter Barker; N°3 Renan Lavigne | 11; 6 | 11; 6 | 11; 6 |
| 2 | (France) (England) | N°1 Nick Matthew; N°1 Grégory Gaultier | 11; 3 | 11; 6 | 11; 4 |
| 3 | (France) (England) | N°2 James Willstrop; N°2 Thierry Lincou | 10; 12 | 8; 11 |

==== Final ====
Australia
1
FINAL
Chennai, India
12 December 2007
Glass Court

England
2

| | | | 1 | 2 | 3 | 4 | 5 |
|---|---|---|---|---|---|---|---|
| 1 | (Australia) (England) | N°1 David Palmer; N°1 Nick Matthew | 11; 9 | 11; 9 | 7; 11 | 2; 11 | 11; 4 |
| 2 | (Australia) (England) | N°2 Stewart Boswell; N°2 James Willstrop | 8; 11 | 7; 11 | 10; 12 |
| 3 | (Australia) (England) | N°3 Cameron Pilley; N°3 Peter Barker | 6; 11 | 3; 11 | 8; 11 |

2007 WSF World Team Championship

England
4th title

Team
Nick Matthew - James Willstrop - Lee Beachill - Peter Barker

== Post-tournament team ranking ==
| Position | Team | Result |
|---|---|---|
| 1st | England | Champions |
| 2nd | Australia | Final |
| 3rd | France | Semi-final |
| 4th | Egypt | Semi-final |
| 5th | Malaysia | Quarter-final |
| 6th | Canada | Quarter-final |
| 7th | Netherlands | Quarter-final |
| 8th | India | Quarter-final |

| Position | Team | Result |
|---|---|---|
| 9th | Pakistan | Round of 16 |
| 10th | Wales | Round of 16 |
| 11th | South Africa | Round of 16 |
| 12th | (Republic of Ireland) Ireland | Round of 16 |
| 13th | New Zealand | Round of 16 |
| 14th | United States | Round of 16 |
| 15th | Hong Kong | Round of 16 |
| 16th | Germany | Round of 16 |

| Position | Team | Result |
|---|---|---|
| 17th | Sweden | Group Stage |
| 18th | Scotland | Group Stage |
| 19th | Spain | Group Stage |
| 20th | Japan | Group Stage |
| 21st | Finland | Group Stage |
| 22nd | Kuwait | Group Stage |
| 23rd | Kenya | Group Stage |
| 24th | Austria | Group Stage |

| Position | Team | Result |
|---|---|---|
| 25th | Sri Lanka | Group Stage |
| 26th | Bermuda | Group Stage |
| 27th | Russia | Group Stage |
| 28th | Venezuela | Group Stage |
| 29th | Chinese Taipei | Group Stage |

== See also ==
- World Team Squash Championships
- World Squash Federation
- 2007 Men's World Open Squash Championship

| Preceded by Pakistan (Islamabad); 2005 | Squash World Team; India (Chennai); 2007 | Succeeded by Denmark (Odense) 2009 |
