= 2006 European Squash Team Championships =

Squash tournament

- 34th
- Location: (Austria) Vienna
- Venue: Wellness Park Oberlaa
- Date: 26 – 29 April 2006
- Website europeansquash.com

Results
- Champions: Men England; Women England

The 2006 European Squash Team Championships was the 34th edition of European Squash Team Championships for squash players. The event was held in Vienna, Austria, from 26 to 29 April 2006. The tournament was organised by the European Squash Federation.

The England men's team won their 31st title and the England women's team won their 29th title.

== Men's tournament ==
=== Group stage ===
Group A

Pos	Team	P	W	D	L	Pts
1	England	3	3	0	0	6
2	Wales	3	2	0	1	4
3	Spain	3	1	0	2	2
4	Scotland	3	0	0	3	0

Group B

Pos	Team	P	W	D	L	Pts
1	France	3	3	0	0	6
2	Netherlands	3	2	0	1	4
3	Germany	3	1	0	2	2
4	Sweden	3	0	0	3	0

=== Semi-finals ===
England
4
Semi-final 1

Netherlands
0

			1	2	3	4	5
1	(England) (Netherlands)	Peter Nicol; Laurens Jan Anjema	6; 9	9; 6	9; 2	9; 2
2	(England) (Netherlands)	Nick Matthew; Tommy Berden	9; 5	8; 10	9; 3
3	(England) (Netherlands)	Lee Beachill; Dylan Bennett	9; 1	9; 3	9; 1
4	(England) (Netherlands)	Peter Barker; Tom Hoevenaars	9; 4	9; 2	9; 3

France
4
Semi-final 2

Wales
0

			1	2	3	4	5
1	(France) (Wales)	Thierry Lincou; Gavin Jones	9; 5	9; 1	9; 3
2	(France) (Wales)	Grégory Gaultier; David Evans	9; 2	9; 0
3	(France) (Wales)	Renan Lavigne; Jethro Binns	9; 2	9; 2	9; 3
4	(France) (Wales)	Julien Balbo; Rob Sutherland	10; 9	6; 9	3; 9	9; 1	9; 3

=== Third place ===
Wales
2
Third place

Netherlands
1

			1	2	3	4	5
1	(Wales) (Netherlands)	Alex Gough; Laurens Jan Anjema	9; 8	9; 1	9; 3
2	(Wales) (Netherlands)	Gavin Jones; Tommy Berden	7; 9	2; 5	9; 5	3; 9
3	(Wales) (Netherlands)	David Evans; Dylan Bennett	9; 1	9; 7	9; 0
4	(Wales) (Netherlands)	Ricky Davies; Lucas Buit	7; 9	9; 3

=== Final ===
England
2 (9)
Final

France
2 (6)

			1	2	3	4	5
1	(England) (France)	James Willstrop; Thierry Lincou	5; 9	9; 2	4; 9	6; 9
2	(England) (France)	Peter Nicol; Grégory Gaultier	9; 6	4; 9	9; 6	1; 9	3; 9
3	(England) (France)	Lee Beachill; Renan Lavigne	9; 2	9; 4	9; 4
4	(England) (France)	Peter Barker; Laurent Elriani	9; 3	9; 3	9; 0

== Women's tournament ==
=== Group stage ===
Group A

Pos	Team	P	W	L	Pts
1	England	3	3	0	6
2	France	3	2	1	4
3	Scotland	3	1	2	2
4	Spain	3	0	3	0

Group B

Pos	Team	P	W	L	Pts
1	Netherlands	3	3	0	6
2	Germany	3	2	1	4
3	Denmark	3	1	2	2
4	(Republic of Ireland) Ireland	3	0	3	0

=== Semi-finals ===
England
3
Semi-final 1

Germany
0

			1	2	3	4	5
1	(England) (Germany)	Vicky Botwright; Daniela Schumann	9; 3	9; 0	9; 3
2	(England) (Germany)	Tania Bailey; Katharina Witt	9; 1	9; 0
3	(England) (Germany)	Linda Elriani; Kathrin Rohrmüller	9; 2	9; 3	9; 1

Netherlands
3
Semi-final 2

France
0

			1	2	3	4	5
1	(Netherlands) (France)	Vanessa Atkinson; Isabelle Stoehr	4; 9	9; 3	9; 6	10; 8
2	(Netherlands) (France)	Annelize Naudé; Camille Serme	9; 6	9; 5
3	(Netherlands) (France)	Orla Noom; Soraya Renai	9; 3	9; 1	1; 9	9; 2

=== Third place ===
Germany
2
Third place

France
1

			1	2	3	4	5
1	(Germany) (France)	Daniela Schumann; Isabelle Stoehr	2; 9	3; 9	2; 9
2	(Germany) (France)	Karin Beriere; Camille Serme	9; 6	9; 7	7; 9	3; 9	9; 2
3	(Germany) (France)	Kathrin Rohrmueller; Celia Allamargot	9; 2	9; 2	9; 4

=== Final ===
England
3
Final

Netherlands
0

			1	2	3	4	5
1	(England) (Netherlands)	Vicky Botwright; Vanessa Atkinson	8; 10	9; 4	9; 3			retired
2	(England) (Netherlands)	Tania Bailey; Annelize Naudé	9; 0	9; 4	9; 4
3	(England) (Netherlands)	Jennifer Duncalf; Orla Noom	9; 2	7; 9	9; 0
