= 2009 European Squash Team Championships =

Squash tournament

- 37th
- Location: (Sweden) Malmö
- Date: 29 April – 3 May 2009
- Website europeansquash.com

Results
- Champions: Men England; Women England

The 2009 European Squash Team Championships was the 37th edition of European Squash Team Championships for squash players. The event was held in Malmö, Sweden, from 29 April to 3 May 2009. The tournament was organised by the European Squash Federation.

The England men's team won their 34th title and the England women's team won their 32nd title.

== Men's tournament ==
=== Group stage ===
Group A

Pos	Team	P	W	L	Pts
1	England	3	3	0	6
2	Wales	3	2	1	4
3	Germany	3	1	2	2
4	Spain	3	0	3	0

Group B

Pos	Team	P	W	L	Pts
1	France	3	3	0	6
2	Netherlands	3	2	1	4
3	Scotland	3	1	2	3
4	Switzerland	3	0	3	0

=== Semi-finals ===
England
4
Semi-final 1

Netherlands
0

			1	2	3	4	5
1	(England) (Netherlands)	Nick Matthew; Dylan Bennett	11; 5	11; 5	11; 8
2	(England) (Netherlands)	Adrian Grant; Rene Mijs	11; 4	11; 4	11; 8
3	(England) (Netherlands)	Peter Barker; Piëdro Schweertman	11; 8	11; 8	11; 5
4	(England) (Netherlands)	Alister Walker; Bart Ravelli	11; 3	11; 4	11; 6

France
4
Semi-final 2

Wales
0

			1	2	3	4	5
1	(France) (Wales)	Grégory Gaultier; Rob Sutherland	11; 5	11; 1	11; 7
2	(France) (Wales)	Renan Lavigne; Peter Creed	12; 10	11; 8	11; 6
3	(France) (Wales)	Thierry Lincou; Jethro Binns	11; 8	11; 6	11; 8
4	(France) (Wales)	Julien Balbo; Nic Birt	11; 7	11; 2	11; 3

=== Third place ===
Wales
2 (168)
Third place

Netherlands
2 (143)

			1	2	3	4	5
1	(Wales) (Netherlands)	Rob Sutherland; Dylan Bennett	8; 11	11; 4	11; 2	11; 8
2	(Wales) (Netherlands)	Jethro Binns; Sebastian Weenink	11; 7	11; 6	11; 7
3	(Wales) (Netherlands)	Alex Gough; Piëdro Schweertman	8; 4	11; 11	9; 9	4; 11	13; 11
4	(Wales) (Netherlands)	Peter Creed; Rene Mijs	11; 4	11; 13	11; 6	6; 11	9; 11

=== Final ===
England
3
Final

France
1

			1	2	3	4	5
1	(England) (France)	Alister Walker; Julien Balbo	11; 7	11; 7	14; 12
2	(England) (France)	Nick Matthew; Grégory Gaultier	11; 9	8; 11	12; 10	11; 5
3	(England) (France)	Peter Barker; Thierry Lincou	13; 15	6; 11	7; 11
4	(England) (France)	Adrian Grant; Renan Lavigne	13; 11	12; 10

== Women's tournament ==
=== Group stage ===
Group A

Pos	Team	P	W	L	Pts
1	England	3	3	0	6
2	(Republic of Ireland) Ireland	3	2	1	4
3	Germany	3	1	2	2
4	Belgium	3	0	3	0

Group B

Pos	Team	P	W	L	Pts
1	Netherlands	3	3	0	6
2	France	3	2	1	4
3	Denmark	3	1	2	2
4	Wales	3	0	3	0

=== Semi-finals ===
England
3
Semi-final 1

France
0

			1	2	3	4	5
1	(England) (France)	Alison Waters; Camille Serme	11; 3	11; 8	11; 4
2	(England) (France)	Jenny Duncalf; Isabelle Stoehr	11; 6	11; 6	11; 7
3	(England) (France)	Laura Massaro; Celia Allamargot	11; 5	11; 5

Netherlands
2
Semi-final 2

Ireland
1

			1	2	3	4	5
1	(Netherlands) (Republic of Ireland)	Vanessa Atkinson; Aisling Blake	6; 11	10; 12	10; 12
2	(Netherlands) (Republic of Ireland)	Natalie Grinham; Madeline Perry	8; 11	11; 5	11; 7	11; 5
3	(Netherlands) (Republic of Ireland)	Annelize Naudé; Zoe Barr	11; 4	11; 6	11; 6

=== Third place ===
France
2
Third place

Ireland
1

			1	2	3	4	5
1	(France) (Republic of Ireland)	Camille Serme; Aisling Blake	4; 11	6; 11	13; 15
2	(France) (Republic of Ireland)	Isabelle Stoehr; Madeline Perry	11; 7	11; 8	8; 11	3; 11	11; 8
3	(France) (Republic of Ireland)	Maud Duplomb; Tanya Owens	9; 4	9; 3	9; 3

=== Final ===
England
3
Final

Netherlands
0

			1	2	3	4	5
1	(England) (Netherlands)	Alison Waters; Vanessa Atkinson	12; 10	14; 12	11; 7
2	(England) (Netherlands)	Jenny Duncalf; Natalie Grinham	11; 5	11; 7	5; 11	8; 11	11; 8
3	(England) (Netherlands)	Laura Massaro; Annelize Naudé	12; 10	11; 2
