= 2005 European Squash Team Championships =

Squash tournament

- 33rd
- Location: (Netherlands) Amsterdam
- Venue: Frans Otten Stadion
- Date: 27 – 30 April 2005
- Website europeansquash.com

Results
- Champions: Men England; Women England

The 2005 European Squash Team Championships was the 33rd edition of European Squash Team Championships for squash players. The event was held at the Frans Otten Stadion in Amsterdam, Netherlands from 27 to 30 April 2005. The tournament was organised by the European Squash Federation.

The England men's team won their 30th title and the England women's team won their 28th title.

== Men's tournament ==
=== Group stage ===
Group A

Pos	Team	P	W	D	L	Pts
1	England	3	3	0	0	6
2	Netherlands	3	2	0	1	4
3	Finland	3	1	0	2	2
4	(Republic of Ireland) Ireland	3	0	0	3	0

Group B

Pos	Team	P	W	D	L	Pts
1	France	3	3	0	0	6
2	Wales	3	2	0	1	4
3	Germany	3	1	0	2	2
4	Spain	3	0	0	3	0

=== Semi-finals ===
England
4
Semi-final 1

Wales
0

			1	2	3	4	5
1	(England) (Wales)	Lee Beachill; Alex Gough	9; 5	9; 1				retired
2	(England) (Wales)	Peter Nicol; David Evans	9; 3	9; 0				retired
3	(England) (Wales)	James Willstrop; Ricky Davies	9; 3	9; 3	9; 3
4	(England) (Wales)	Simon Parke; Jethro Binns	9; 0	9; 0	9; 1

France
4
Semi-final 2

Netherlands
0

			1	2	3	4	5
1	(France) (Netherlands)	Thierry Lincou; Tommy Berden	9; 4	9; 1	9; 0
2	(France) (Netherlands)	Grégory Gaultier; Laurens Jan Anjema	9; 7	9; 4				retired
3	(France) (Netherlands)	Renan Lavigne; Lucas Buit	9; 5	9; 3	9; 6
4	(France) (Netherlands)	Jean-Michel Arcucci; Marc Reus	9; 7	9; 3	9; 6

=== Third place ===
Netherlands
3
Third place

Wales
1

			1	2	3	4	5
1	(Netherlands) (Wales)	Tommy Berden; Alex Gough	9; 6	10; 8	9; 2
2	(Netherlands) (Wales)	Laurens Jan Anjema; David Evans	5; 9	9; 2	5; 9	9; 7	9; 4
3	(Netherlands) (Wales)	Lucas Buit; Gavin Jones	9; 10	8; 10	8; 10
4	(Netherlands) (Wales)	Dylan Bennett; Ricky Davies	9; 5	3; 9	9; 6	9; 3

=== Final ===
England
4
Final

France
0

			1	2	3	4	5
1	(England) (France)	James Willstrop; Laurent Elriani	9	9	9
2	(England) (France)	Nick Matthew; Renan Lavigne	9	9	9
3	(England) (France)	Lee Beachill; Thierry Lincou	9; 4	7; 9	9; 4
4	(England) (France)	Peter Nicol; Grégory Gaultier	9; 4	4; 9	10; 8

== Women's tournament ==
=== Group stage ===
Group A

Pos	Team	P	W	L	Pts
1	England	3	3	0	6
2	Scotland	3	2	1	4
3	Germany	3	1	2	2
4	Belgium	3	0	3	0

Group B

Pos	Team	P	W	L	Pts
1	Netherlands	3	3	0	6
2	(Republic of Ireland) Ireland	3	2	1	4
3	France	3	1	2	2
4	Denmark	3	0	3	0

=== Semi-finals ===
England
3
Semi-final 1

Ireland
0

			1	2	3	4	5
1	(England) (Republic of Ireland)	Linda Elriani; Madeline Perry	8; 10	9; 6	9; 6	9; 5
2	(England) (Republic of Ireland)	Vicky Botwright; Aisling Blake	9; 1	9; 1
3	(England) (Republic of Ireland)	Jenny Duncalf; Laura Mylotte	9; 4	9; 0	9; 0

Netherlands
3
Semi-final 2

Scotland
0

			1	2	3	4	5
1	(Netherlands) (Scotland)	Vanessa Atkinson; Pamela Nimmo	10; 8	9; 0	2; 9	9; 7
2	(Netherlands) (Scotland)	Annelize Naudé; Lizzie Leitch	9; 0	9; 2
3	(Netherlands) (Scotland)	Margriet Huisman; Frania Gillen-Buchert	9; 1	9; 4	9; 7

=== Third place ===
Ireland
3

Scotland
0

			1	2	3	4	5
1	(Republic of Ireland) (Scotland)	Madeline Perry; Pamela Nimmo	9; 1	9; 3	9; 2
2	(Republic of Ireland) (Scotland)	Aisling Blake; Louise Philip	9; 5	9; 2	9; 3
3	(Republic of Ireland) (Scotland)	Laura Mylotte; Frania Gillen-Buchert	9; 7	5; 9	9; 5	9; 3

=== Final ===
England
2
Final

Netherlands
1

			1	2	3	4	5
1	(England) (Netherlands)	Jenny Duncalf; Margriet Huisman	9; 0	9; 2	9; 2
2	(England) (Netherlands)	Linda Elriani; Vanessa Atkinson	2; 9	8; 10	6; 9
3	(England) (Netherlands)	Vicky Botwright; Annelize Naudé	10; 8	9; 0	9; 10	9; 5
