= 2009 Men's World Team Squash Championships =

Men's World Team 2009
- 22nd WSF World Men's Team Championship
- Location: Odense, Denmark
- Date: September 27 - October 3, 2009
- Teams: 28 (from all the 5 confederations)
- Website www.squashsite.co.uk/worldteams/

Results
- Champions: Egypt
- Runners-up: France
- Third place: Australia

The 2009 Men's World Team Squash Championships is the men's edition of the 2009 World Team Squash Championships organized by the World Squash Federation, which serves as the world team championship for squash players. The event were held in Odense, Denmark and took place from September 27 to October 3, 2009. The tournament was organized by the World Squash Federation and the Danish Squash Federation. The Egypt team won his second World Team Championships beating the French team in the final.

== Participating teams ==
A total of 28 teams competed from all the five confederations: Africa, America, Asia, Europe and Oceania. For Serbia, it was their first participation at a world team championship.

Africa (SFA)	America (FPS)	Asia (ASF)	Europe (ESF)	Oceania (OSF)	Map
Egypt; Kenya; South Africa	Canada; United States; Venezuela	Hong Kong; India; Japan; Kuwait; Malaysia; Pakistan	Austria; Denmark (Host Country); England (Title Holder); France; Finland; Germany; Ireland; Italy; Netherlands; Scotland; Serbia; Spain; Sweden; Wales	Australia; New Zealand	Map of the participating nations

== Seeds ==
1. Egypt (champion)
2. England (semifinals)
3. France (final)
4. Australia (semifinals)
5. Malaysia (round of 16)
6. Pakistan (quarterfinals)
7. Canada (quarterfinals)
8. Italy (quarterfinals)
9. India (first round)
10. New Zealand (round of 16)
11. South Africa (quarterfinals)
12. United States (round of 16)
13. Netherlands (round of 16)
14. (Republic of Ireland) Ireland (round of 16)
15. Germany (round of 16)
16. Hong Kong (first round)

== Squads ==
Egypt

- Karim Darwish
- Amr Shabana
- Ramy Ashour
- Wael El Hindi

Hong Kong

- Dick Lau
- Max Lee
- Leo Au
- Anson Kwong

Kuwait

- Abdullah Al Muzayen
- Bader Al-Hussaini
- Salem Fayez Mohammed
- Ammar Abldulkareem Altamimi

Serbia

- Dennis Drenjovski
- Daniel Zilic
- Ivan Djordjevic
- Marko Matanovic

England

- Nick Matthew
- Peter Barker
- James Willstrop
- Adrian Grant

Germany

- Simon Rösner
- Jens Schoor
- Stefan Leifels
- Raphael Kandra

Austria

- Aqeel Rehman
- Jakob Dirnberger
- Stefan Brauneis
- Christian Coufal

Japan

- Yuta Fukui
- Shinnosuke Tsukue
- Takanori Shimizu
- Jun Matsumoto

France

- Grégory Gaultier
- Thierry Lincou
- Renan Lavigne
- Julien Balbo

(Republic of Ireland) Ireland

- Liam Kenny
- John Rooney
- Arthur Gaskin
- Derek Ryan

Denmark

- Rasmus Nielsen
- Kristian Frost Olesen
- Kim Povlsen
- Danny Knudsen

Australia

- David Palmer
- Stewart Boswell
- Cameron Pilley
- Aaron Frankcomb

Netherlands

- Laurens Jan Anjema
- Piëdro Schweertman
- Rene Mijs
- Sebastiaan Weenink

Wales

- Rob Sutherland
- Jethro Binns
- Peter Creed
- Nic Birt

Malaysia

- Ong Beng Hee
- Mohd Azlan Iskandar
- Mohd Nafiizwan Adnan
- Ivan Yuen

United States

- Julian Illingworth
- Gilly Lane
- Chris Gordon
- Preston Quick

Finland

- Olli Tuominen
- Henrik Mustonen
- Matias Tuomi
- Hammed Ahmed

Pakistan

- Aamir Atlas Khan
- Farhan Mehboob
- Yasir Butt
- Mansoor Zaman

South Africa

- Steve Coppinger
- Rodney Durbach
- Jesse Engelbrecht
- Clinton Leeuw

Sweden

- Rasmus Hult
- Carl-Johan Lofvenborg
- Joakim Larsson
- Andre Wikstorm

Kenya

- Hardeep Reel
- Hartaj Bains
- Rajdeep Bains
- Joseph Ndung'u Karigit

Canada

- Jonathon Power
- Shahier Razik
- Shawn Delierre
- David Philips

New Zealand

- Kashif Shuja
- Campbell Grayson
- Martin Knight
- Alex Grayson

Spain

- David Vidal
- Alejandro Garbi
- Eduardo Gonzalez
- Carlos Cornes

Italy

- Davide Bianchetti
- Marcus Berrett
- Amr Swelim
- Jose Facchini

India

- Saurav Ghosal
- Ritwik Bhattacharya
- Siddharth Suchde
- Harinder Pal Sandhu

Scotland

- Alan Clyne
- Stuart Crawford
- Chris Small
- Lyall Paterson

Venezuela

- Francisco Valecillo
- Juan Pablo Rothie
- Juan Pablo Sanchez
- Gabriel Teran

== Group stage results ==
=== Pool A ===
Egypt	3	-	0	Kuwait
Hong Kong	3	-	0	Serbia

Egypt	3	-	0	Hong Kong
Kuwait	3	-	0	Serbia

Egypt	3	-	0	Serbia
Hong Kong	1	-	2	Kuwait

Rank	Nation	Match	Won	Lost	Points
1	Egypt	3	3	0	6
2	Kuwait	3	2	1	4
3	Hong Kong	3	1	2	2
4	Serbia	3	0	2	0

=== Pool B ===
England	3	-	0	Austria
Germany	3	-	0	Japan

England	3	-	0	Japan
Germany	3	-	0	Austria

England	2	-	1	Germany
Austria	2	-	1	Japan

Rank	Nation	Match	Won	Lost	Points
1	England	3	3	0	6
2	Germany	3	2	1	4
3	Austria	3	1	2	2
4	Japan	3	0	2	0

=== Pool C ===
(Republic of Ireland) Ireland	3	-	0	Denmark

France	3	-	0	Denmark

France	3	-	0	(Republic of Ireland) Ireland

Rank	Nation	Match	Won	Lost	Points
1	France	2	2	0	4
2	(Republic of Ireland) Ireland	2	1	1	2
3	Denmark	2	0	2	0

=== Pool D ===
Netherlands	2	-	1	Wales

Australia	3	-	0	Wales

Australia	2	-	1	Netherlands

Rank	Nation	Match	Won	Lost	Points
1	Australia	2	2	0	4
2	Netherlands	2	1	1	2
3	Wales	2	0	2	0

=== Pool E ===
United States	2	-	1	Finland

Malaysia	2	-	1	Finland

Malaysia	3	-	0	United States

Rank	Nation	Match	Won	Lost	Points
1	Malaysia	2	2	0	4
2	United States	2	1	1	2
3	Finland	2	0	2	0

=== Pool F ===
Pakistan	3	-	0	Kenya
South Africa	2	-	1	Sweden

Pakistan	3	-	0	Sweden
South Africa	3	-	0	Kenya

Pakistan	1	-	2	South Africa
Sweden	3	-	0	Kenya

Rank	Nation	Match	Won	Lost	Points
1	South Africa	3	3	0	6
2	Pakistan	3	2	1	4
3	Sweden	3	1	2	2
4	Kenya	3	0	2	0

=== Pool G ===
New Zealand	2	-	1	Spain

Canada	3	-	0	Spain

Canada	3	-	0	New Zealand

Rank	Nation	Match	Won	Lost	Points
1	Canada	2	2	0	4
2	New Zealand	2	1	1	2
3	Spain	2	0	2	0

=== Pool H ===
Italy	3	-	0	Venezuela
India	0	-	3	Scotland

Italy	3	-	0	Scotland
India	3	-	0	Venezuela

Italy	2	-	1	India
Scotland	3	-	0	Venezuela

Rank	Nation	Match	Won	Lost	Points
1	Italy	3	3	0	6
2	Scotland	3	2	1	4
3	India	3	1	2	2
4	Venezuela	3	0	2	0

== Finals ==
=== Draw ===
Round of 16
1	Egypt	3	3	2
15	Germany	0	1	0
7	Canada	3	3	2
Scotland	0	2	0
4	Australia	3	3	2
14	(Republic of Ireland) Ireland	0	0	0
5	Malaysia	1	3	1
6	Pakistan	3	0	3
12	United States	1	3	1
11	South Africa	3	1	3
13	Netherlands	0	0	0
3	France	3	3	2
10	New Zealand	2	3	0
8	Italy	3	2	3
Kuwait	0	1	2
2	England	3	3	1

Quarterfinals
1	Egypt	3	3	2
7	Canada	1	1	1
4	Australia	3	3	2
6	Pakistan	0	0	0
11	South Africa	1	0	1
3	France	3	3	2
8	Italy	0	0	0
2	England	3	3	2

Semifinals
1	Egypt	3	3	2
4	Australia	1	2	0
3	France	1	3	3
2	England	3	1	1

Final
1	Egypt	1	3	3
3	France	3	0	1

Third place match
4	Australia	1	3	3
2	England	3	2	1

=== Results ===
==== Quarter-finals ====
Egypt
3
QUARTER FINAL
Odense, Denmark
1 October 2009
Glass Court

Canada
0

			1	2	3	4	5
1	(Egypt) (Canada)	N°1 Amr Shabana; N°1 Jonathon Power	11; 9	4; 11	11; 6	11; 7
2	(Egypt) (Canada)	N°2 Ramy Ashour; N°2 Shahier Razik	11; 9	4; 11	11; 6	11; 7
3	(Egypt) (Canada)	N°3 Wael El Hindi; N°3 David Phillips	7; 11	11; 6	14; 12

Australia
3
QUARTER FINAL
Odense, Denmark
1 October 2009
Glass Court

Pakistan
0

			1	2	3	4	5
1	(Australia) (Pakistan)	N°1 David Palmer; N°1 Farhan Mehboob	11; 5	11; 9	11; 6
2	(Australia) (Pakistan)	N°2 Stewart Boswell; N°2 Yasir Butt	11; 5	11; 10	11; 5
3	(Australia) (Pakistan)	N°3 Cameron Pilley; N°3 Mansoor Zaman	11; 6	11; 7

South Africa
0
QUARTER FINAL
Odense, Denmark
1 October 2009
Glass Court

France
3

			1	2	3	4	5
1	(South Africa) (France)	N°1 Rodney Durbach; N°1 Grégory Gaultier	5; 11	14; 12	6; 11	5; 11
2	(South Africa) (France)	N°2 Jesse Engelbrecht; N°2 Thierry Lincou	6; 11	7; 11	6; 11
3	(South Africa) (France)	N°3 Clinton Leeuw; N°3 Julien Balbo	11; 7	0; 11	5; 11

Italy
0
QUARTER FINAL
Odense, Denmark
1 October 2009
Glass Court

Egypt
3

			1	2	3	4	5
1	(Italy) (Egypt)	N°1 Marcus Berrett; N°1 James Willstrop	3; 11	10; 11	6; 11
2	(Italy) (Egypt)	N°2 Amr Swelim; N°2 Peter Barker	4; 11	4; 11	5; 11
3	(Italy) (Egypt)	N°3 Jose Facchini; N°3 Adrian Grant	5; 11	9; 11

==== Semi-finals ====
Egypt
3
SEMI FINAL
Odense, Denmark
2 October 2009
Glass Court

Australia
0

			1	2	3	4	5
1	(Egypt) (Australia)	N°3 Ramy Ashour; N°3 Cameron Pilley	13; 11	8; 11	11; 6	11; 9
2	(Egypt) (Australia)	N°1 Karim Darwish; N°1 David Palmer	11; 6	4; 11	14; 16	11; 8	5; 5
3	(Egypt) (Australia)	N°2 Amr Shabana; N°2 Stewart Boswell	12; 10	11; 7

France
2
SEMI FINAL
Odense, Denmark
2 October 2009
Glass Court

England
1

			1	2	3	4	5
1	(France) (England)	N°3 Renan Lavigne; N°3 Adrian Grant	11; 9	5; 11	4; 11	3; 11
2	(France) (England)	N°1 Grégory Gaultier; N°1 James Willstrop	11; 10	6; 11	11; 6	12; 10
3	(France) (England)	N°2 Thierry Lincou; N°2 Peter Barker	11; 6	11; 8	7; 11	11; 8

==== Final ====
Egypt
2
FINAL
Odense, Denmark
3 October 2009
Glass Court

France
1

			1	2	3	4	5
1	(Egypt) (France)	N°1 Karim Darwish; N°1 Grégory Gaultier	11; 8	5; 11	8; 11	2; 11
2	(Egypt) (France)	N°3 Ramy Ashour; N°3 Renan Lavigne	11; 3	11; 4	11; 5
3	(Egypt) (France)	N°2 Amr Shabana; N°2 Thierry Lincou	11; 6	7; 11	12; 10	12; 10

2009 WSF World Team Championship

Egypt
2nd title

Team
Karim Darwish - Amr Shabana - Ramy Ashour - Wael El Hindi

== Post-tournament team ranking ==
Position	Team	Result
1st	Egypt	Champions
2nd	France	Final
3rd	Australia	Semi-final
4th	England	Semi-final
5th	Pakistan	Quarter-final
6th	South Africa	Quarter-final
7th	Italy	Quarter-final
8th	Canada	Quarter-final

Position	Team	Result
9th	Malaysia	Round of 16
10th	New Zealand	Round of 16
11th	Germany	Round of 16
12th	United States	Round of 16
13th	Scotland	Round of 16
14th	Netherlands	Round of 16
15th	Kuwait	Round of 16
16th	(Republic of Ireland) Ireland	Round of 16

Position	Team	Result
17th	Hong Kong	Group Stage
18th	India	Group Stage
19th	Finland	Group Stage
20th	Denmark	Group Stage
21st	Wales	Group Stage
22nd	Sweden	Group Stage
23rd	Spain	Group Stage
24th	Austria	Group Stage

Position	Team	Result
25th	Japan	Group Stage
26th	Kenya	Group Stage
27th	Serbia	Group Stage
28th	Venezuela	Group Stage

== See also ==
- World Team Squash Championships
- World Squash Federation
- 2009 Men's World Open Squash Championship

Preceded by India (Chennai); 2007	Squash World Team; Denmark (Odense); 2009	Succeeded by Germany (Paderborn); 2011
