= 2003 Men's World Team Squash Championships =

Men's World Team 2003
- 19th World Men's Team Championship
- Location: Vienna, Austria
- Date: October 19–25, 2003
- Teams: 30 (from all the 5 confederations)

Results
- Champions: Australia
- Runners-up: France
- Third place: England

The 2003 Men's World Team Squash Championships is the men's edition of the 2003 World Team Squash Championships organized by the World Squash Federation, which serves as the world team championship for squash players. The event were held in Vienna, Austria and took place from October 19-25, 2003.

== Participating teams ==
A total of 30 teams competed from all the five confederations: Africa, America, Asia, Europe and Oceania. For Bermuda, Czech Republic, Hungary, Russia, Slovenia and South Korea it was their first participation at a world team championship.

Africa (SFA)	America (FPS)	Asia (ASF)	Europe (ESF)	Oceania (OSF)	Map
Egypt; South Africa	Bermuda; Canada; Mexico; United States	Hong Kong; Japan; Kuwait; Malaysia; Pakistan; South Korea	Austria (Host Country); Czech Republic; England; France; Finland; Germany; Hungary; Ireland; Italy; Netherlands; Russia; Scotland; Slovenia; Spain; Sweden; Switzerland; Wales	Australia (Title Holder); New Zealand	

== Group stage results ==
=== Pool A ===
Team One	Team Two	Score
Australia	Japan	3-0
Germany	Russia	3-0
Japan	Russia	3-0
Australia	Germany	3-0
Australia	Russia	3-0
Germany	Japan	3-0

Pos	Team	P	W	L	Pts
1	Australia (David Palmer, Anthony Ricketts, Paul Price)	3	3	0	6
2	Germany (Simon Frenz, Stefan Leifels, Oliver Post)	3	2	1	4
3	Japan (Kimihiko Sano, Takehide Nishio, Jun Matsumoto)	3	1	2	2
4	Russia (Alexei Severinov, Serguei Kostrykine, Maxim Shokin)	3	0	3	0

=== Pool B ===
Team One	Team Two	Score
England	Hungary	3-0
Switzerland	New Zealand	2-1
England	New Zealand	3-0
Switzerland	Hungary	2-1
England	Switzerland	3-0
New Zealand	Hungary	3-0

Pos	Team	P	W	L	Pts
1	England (Lee Beachill, Nick Matthew, James Willstrop, Peter Nicol)	3	3	0	6
2	Switzerland (Lars Harms, André Holderegger, Kevin Villiger, Marco Dätwyler)	3	2	1	4
3	New Zealand (Glen Wilson, Daniel Sharplin, Callum O'Brien, Oliver Johnston)	3	1	2	2
4	Hungary (András Török, Márk Krajcsák, Sandor Fulop)	3	0	3	0

=== Pool C ===
Team One	Team Two	Score
France	Austria	3-0
Austria	Slovenia	3-0
France	Sweden	3-0
Sweden	Slovenia	3-0
Austria	Sweden	1-2
France	Slovenia	3-0

Pos	Team	P	W	L	Pts
1	France (Thierry Lincou, Grégory Gaultier, Renan Lavigne, Jean-Michel Arcucci)	3	3	0	6
2	Sweden (Christian Drakenberg, Henrik Lofvenborg, Joakim Karlsson, Badr Abdel Aziz)	3	2	1	4
3	Austria (Leopold Czaska, Clemens Wallishauser, David Huck, Andreas Fuchs)	3	1	2	2
4	Slovenia (Damir Bezan, Klemen Gutman, Miha Kavas)	3	0	3	0

=== Pool D ===
Team One	Team Two	Score
Egypt	Bermuda	3-0
Hong Kong	Finland	2-1
Egypt	Hong Kong	3-0
(Hong Kong) Finland	Bermuda	3-0
Egypt	Finland	3-0
Hong Kong	Bermuda	2-1

Pos	Team	P	W	L	Pts
1	Egypt (Karim Darwish, Amr Shabana, Mohammed Abbas, Wael El Hindi)	3	3	0	6
2	Hong Kong (Farrukh Khan, Wong Waihang, Dick Lau, Roger Ngan)	3	2	1	4
3	Finland (Olli Tuominen, Hameed Ahmed, Matias Tuomi)	3	1	2	2
4	Bermuda (Nicholas Kyme, James Stout, Sam Stevens)	3	0	3	0

=== Pool E ===
Team One	Team Two	Score
Canada	Czech Republic	3-0
Canada	Netherlands	3-0
Czech Republic	Netherlands	0-3

Pos	Team	P	W	L	Pts
1	Canada (Jonathon Power, Graham Ryding, Shahier Razik, Viktor Berg)	2	2	0	4
2	Netherlands (Tommy Berden, Lucas Buit, Dylan Bennett, Michael Fiteni)	2	1	1	2
3	Czech Republic (Jan Koukal, Martin Stepan, Pavel Sladecek)	2	0	2	0

=== Pool F ===
Team One	Team Two	Score
Scotland	South Korea	3-0
South Africa	United States	3-0
Scotland	United States	3-0
South Africa	South Korea	3-0
Scotland	South Africa	2-1
United States	South Korea	3-0

Pos	Team	P	W	L	Pts
1	Scotland (Martin Heath, John White, Neil Frankland, Peter O'Hara)	3	3	0	6
2	South Africa (Rodney Durbach, Craig van der Wath, Gregory La Mude)	3	2	1	4
3	United States (Preston Quick, Jamie Crombie, Tim Wyant, Damian Walker)	3	1	2	2
4	South Korea (Yong-Chun Chong, Dong-Woo Kim, Jaung-Gue Park)	3	0	3	0

=== Pool G ===
Team One	Team Two	Score
Wales	Mexico	3-0
(Republic of Ireland) Ireland	Kuwait	3-0
Wales	(Republic of Ireland) Ireland	3-0
Mexico	Kuwait	2-1
Mexico	(Republic of Ireland) Ireland	1-2
Wales	Kuwait	3-0

Pos	Team	P	W	L	Pts
1	Wales (David Evans, Alex Gough, Gavin Jones)	3	3	0	6
2	(Republic of Ireland) Ireland (Derek Ryan, John Rooney, Graeme Stewart, Niall Rooney)	3	2	1	4
3	Mexico (Eric Gálvez, Jorge Baltazar, Armando Zarazua, Mauricio Sanchez)	3	1	2	2
4	Kuwait (Abdullah Al-Muzayen, Bader Alhosaini, Ali Alramezi, Nasser Alramezi)	3	0	3	0

=== Pool H ===
Team One	Team Two	Score
Malaysia	Pakistan	2-1
Pakistan	Italy	3-0
Malaysia	Italy	3-0

Pos	Team	P	W	L	Pts
1	Malaysia (Mohd Azlan Iskandar, Ong Beng Hee, Kelvin Ho, Timothy Arnold)	2	2	0	4
2	Pakistan (Mansoor Zaman, Farrukh Zaman, Majid Khan)	2	1	1	2
3	Italy (Andrea Capella, Francesco Busi, Andrea Torricini)	2	0	2	0

== Finals ==
=== Draw ===
Round of 16
Egypt	3
South Africa	0
Wales	3
Germany	0
Australia	3
Netherlands	0
Hong Kong	2
Malaysia	1
Scotland	3
Switzerland	0
France	3
(Republic of Ireland) Ireland	0
Canada
Sweden
England	3
Pakistan	0

Quarterfinals
Egypt	3
Wales	0
Australia	3
Hong Kong	0
Scotland	1
France	2
Canada	1
England	2

Semifinals
Egypt	0
Australia	3
France	2
England	1

Final
Australia	3
France	0

=== Third Place play off ===
Team One	Team Two	Score
England	Egypt	3-0

=== Final ===
Australia
3
FINAL
Vienna, Austria
25 October 2003

France
0

			1	2	3	4	5
1	(Australia) (France)	David Palmer; Thierry Lincou	9; 0	9; 3	6; 9	9; 5
2	(Australia) (France)	Anthony Ricketts; Grégory Gaultier	9; 4	9; 7	2; 9	8; 10	9; 0
3	(Australia) (France)	Paul Price; Renan Lavigne	9; 3	9; 3

2003 WSF World Team Championship

Australia
8th title

Team
David Palmer - Anthony Ricketts - Paul Price

== See also ==
- World Team Squash Championships
- World Squash Federation
- World Open (squash)

Preceded by Australia (Melbourne); 2001	Squash World Team; Austria (Vienna); 2003	Succeeded by Pakistan (Islamabad) 2005
