= 2007 European Squash Team Championships =

Squash tournament

- 35th
- Location: (Italy) Riccione
- Date: 2 – 5 May 2007
- Website europeansquash.com

Results
- Champions: Men England; Women England

The 2007 European Squash Team Championships was the 35th edition of European Squash Team Championships for squash players. The event was held in Riccione, Italy, from 2 to 5 May 2007. The tournament was organised by the European Squash Federation.

The England men's team won their 32nd title and the England women's team won their 30th title. In the men's semi final the Netherlands defeated France in extraordinary circumstances after the teams drew 2-2 and also drew with 76 match points each. The Netherlands were awarded the tie by virtue of winning the first string match.

== Men's tournament ==
=== Group stage ===
Group A

Pos	Team	P	W	D	L	Pts
1	England	3	3	0	0	6
2	Netherlands	3	2	0	1	4
3	(Republic of Ireland) Ireland	3	1	0	2	2
4	Scotland	3	0	0	3	0

Group B

Pos	Team	P	W	D	L	Pts
1	France	3	2	1	0	5
2	Wales	3	2	1	0	5
3	Germany	3	1	0	2	2
4	Spain	3	0	0	3	0

=== Semi-finals ===
England
4
Semi-final 1

Wales
0

			1	2	3	4	5
1	(England) (Wales)	James Willstrop; Rob Sutherland	9; 4	9; 0	9; 2
2	(England) (Wales)	Nick Matthew; Ricky Davies	9; 3	9; 1	9; 1
3	(England) (Wales)	Lee Beachill; Jethro Binns	9; 0	10; 8
4	(England) (Wales)	Peter Barker; Nic Birt	9; 0	9; 5	9; 5

Netherlands
2 (76)
Semi-final 2

France
2 (76)

			1	2	3	4	5
1	(Netherlands) (France)	Laurens Jan Anjema; Renan Lavigne	10; 8	9; 2	9; 1
2	(Netherlands) (France)	Lucas Buit; Jean-Michel Arcucci	7; 9	4; 9	2; 9
3	(Netherlands) (France)	Sebastiiaan Weenink; Romain Tenant	3; 9	5; 9	0; 9
4	(Netherlands) (France)	Dylan Bennett; Julien Balbo	9; 5	9; 3	9; 3

=== Third place ===
France
3
Third place

Wales
1

			1	2	3	4	5
1	(France) (Wales)	Renan Lavigne; Alex Gough	4; 9	3; 9	7; 9
2	(France) (Wales)	Romain Tenant; Jethro Binns	9; 3	9; 6	9; 2
3	(France) (Wales)	Julien Balbo; Ricky Davies	9; 7	9; 6	9; 1
4	(France) (Wales)	Jean-Michel Arcucci; Rob Sutherland	9; 3	9; 7	9; 5

=== Final ===
England
4
Final

Netherlands
0

			1	2	3	4	5
1	(England) (Netherlands)	Adrian Grant; Tom Hoevenaars	9; 3	9; 0	9; 1
2	(England) (Netherlands)	James Willstrop; Laurens Jan Anjema	9; 7	9; 6	7; 9	9; 5
3	(England) (Netherlands)	Nick Matthew; Lucas Buit	9; 0	9; 2	9; 3
4	(England) (Netherlands)	Lee Beachill; Dylan Bennett	9; 1	9; 1

== Women's tournament ==
=== Group stage ===
Group A

Pos	Team	P	W	L	Pts
1	England	3	3	0	6
2	Denmark	3	2	1	4
3	France	3	1	2	2
4	Spain	3	0	3	0

Group B

Pos	Team	P	W	L	Pts
1	Netherlands	3	3	0	6
2	Germany	3	2	1	4
3	Switzerland	3	1	2	2
4	Czech Republic	3	0	3	0

=== Semi-finals ===
England
3
Semi-final 1

Germany
0

			1	2	3	4	5
1	(England) (Germany)	Jenny Duncalf; Carola Weiss	9; 1	9; 1	9; 3
2	(England) (Germany)	Tania Bailey; Daniella Schumann	9; 0	9; 1	9; 1
3	(England) (Germany)	Vicky Botwright; Katharina Witt	9; 0	9; 5

Netherlands
3
Semi-final 2

Denmark
3

			1	2	3	4	5
1	(Netherlands) (Denmark)	Karen Kronemeyer; Marie Louise Peddern	9; 0	9; 5	9; 0
2	(Netherlands) (Denmark)	Vanessa Atkinson; Line Hansen	9; 6	9; 7	9; 5
3	(Netherlands) (Denmark)	Annelize Naudé; Ellen Hamborg-Petersen	9; 10	9; 7	9; 5

=== Third place ===
Denmark
2
Third place

Germany
1

			1	2	3	4	5
1	(Denmark) (Germany)	Marie Louise Peddern; Carola Weiss	4; 9	0; 9	4; 9
2	(Denmark) (Germany)	Line Hansen; Kathrin Rohrmüller	9; 7	9; 1	10; 9
3	(Denmark) (Germany)	Ellen Hamborg-Petersen; Katharina Witt	9; 2	9; 6	9; 1

=== Final ===
England
3
Final

Netherlands
0

			1	2	3	4	5
1	(England) (Netherlands)	Alison Waters; Margriet Huisman	9; 0	10; 4	9; 0
2	(England) (Netherlands)	Tania Bailey; Vanessa Atkinson	9; 2	9; 2	9; 2
3	(England) (Netherlands)	Vicky Botwright; Annelize Naudé	9; 0	10; 8
