= 2005 Men's World Team Squash Championships =

Men's World Team 2005
- 20th WSF World Men's Team Championship
- Location: Islamabad, Pakistan
- Date: December 8 - 14, 2005
- Teams: 22 (from all the 5 confederations)
- Website www.squashtalk.com/worldmensteams/

Results
- Champions: England
- Runners-up: Egypt
- Third place: France

The 2005 Men's World Team Squash Championships is the men's edition of the 2005 World Team Squash Championships organized by the World Squash Federation, which serves as the world team championship for squash players. The event were held in Islamabad, Pakistan and took place from December 8 to December 14, 2005. The tournament was organized by the World Squash Federation and the Pakistan Squash Federation. The England team won his third World Team Championships beating the Egyptian team in the final.

== Participating teams ==
A total of 22 teams competed from all the five confederations: Africa, America, Asia, Europe and Oceania. For Iran, it was their first participation at a world team championship.

Africa (SFA)	America (FPS)	Asia (ASF)	Europe (ESF)	Oceania (OSF)	Map
Egypt; South Africa	Canada; United States	Hong Kong; Iran; India; Kuwait; Malaysia; Pakistan (Host Country)	Austria; England; France; Finland; Germany; Ireland; Netherlands; Scotland; Spain; Wales	Australia (Title Holder); New Zealand	Map of the participating nations

== Seeds ==
1. England (champion)
2. Egypt (final)
3. France (semifinals)
4. Australia (quarterfinals)
5. Canada (semifinals)
6. Malaysia (quarterfinals)
7. Pakistan (quarterfinals)
8. Wales (quarterfinals)
9. Netherlands (round of 16)
10. India (round of 16)
11. New Zealand (first round)
12. South Africa (round of 16)

== Squads ==
England

- James Willstrop
- Lee Beachill
- Peter Nicol
- Nick Matthew

South Africa

- Rodney Durbach
- Michael Toothill
- Rowan Smith
- Clinton Leeuw

Kuwait

- Abdullah Al Muzayen
- Bader Al-Hussaini
- Nasser Al Ramezi
- Mohammed Hajeyah

Austria

- Aqeel Rehman
- Jakob Dirnberger
- Stefan Brauneis
- Andreas Freudensprung

Egypt

- Amr Shabana
- Karim Darwish
- Mohammed Abbas
- Wael El Hindi

New Zealand

- Kashif Shuja
- Callum O’Brien
- Campbell Grayson
- Martin Knight

Germany

- Simon Rösner
- Stefan Leifels
- Simon Baker
- Patrick Gaessler

Iran

- Mohammed Hossein Sanaee
- Majid Rohani
- Paya Ahmed Abadi
- Mohammad Hossein Jafari

France

- Thierry Lincou
- Grégory Gaultier
- Renan Lavigne
- Jean-Michel Arcucci

India

- Ritwik Bhattacharya
- Saurav Ghosal
- Siddharth Suchde
- Gaurav Nandrajog

(Republic of Ireland) Ireland

- Liam Kenny
- Arthur Gaskin
- Neal Murphy
- Brian Byrne

Australia

- Anthony Ricketts
- Joseph Kneipp
- Stewart Boswell
- Cameron Pilley

Netherlands

- Laurens Jan Anjema
- Dylan Bennett
- Tom Hoevenaars
- Marc Reus

Finland

- Olli Tuominen
- Matais Tuomi
- Erno Teitti
- Hameed Ahmed

United States

- Preston Quick
- Julian Illingworth
- Chris Gordon
- Beau River

Canada

- Jonathon Power
- Graham Ryding
- Shahier Razik
- Matthew Giuffre

Wales

- Alex Gough
- David Evans
- Gavin Jones
- Ricky Davies

Hong Kong

- Wong Wai Hang
- Dick Lau
- Roger Ngan
- Anson Kwong

Malaysia

- Mohd Azlan Iskandar
- Ong Beng Hee
- Timothy Arnold
- Mohd Nafiizwan Adnan

Pakistan

- Shahid Zaman
- Mansoor Zaman
- Farhan Mehboob
- Safeerullah Ullah Khan

Scotland

- John White
- Harry Leitch
- Stuart Crawford
- Alan Clyne

Spain

- Borja Golán
- David Vidal
- Iago Cornes
- Alejandro Garbi

== Group stage results ==
=== Pool A ===
England	3	-	0	Kuwait
South Africa	3	-	0	Austria

England	3	-	0	South Africa
Kuwait	3	-	0	Austria

England	3	-	0	Austria
South Africa	2	-	1	Kuwait

Rank	Nation	Match	Won	Lost	Points
1	England	3	3	0	6
2	South Africa	3	2	1	4
3	Kuwait	3	1	2	2
4	Austria	3	0	3	0

=== Pool B ===
Egypt	3	-	0	Germany
New Zealand	3	-	0	Iran

Egypt	3	-	0	New Zealand
Germany	3	-	0	Iran

Egypt	3	-	0	Iran
New Zealand	1	-	2	Germany

Rank	Nation	Match	Won	Lost	Points
1	Egypt	3	3	0	6
2	Germany	3	2	1	4
3	New Zealand	3	1	2	2
4	Iran	3	0	3	0

=== Pool C ===
France	3	-	0	(Republic of Ireland) Ireland

France	3	-	0	India

India	2	-	1	(Republic of Ireland) Ireland

Rank	Nation	Match	Won	Lost	Points
1	France	2	2	0	4
2	India	2	1	1	2
3	(Republic of Ireland) Ireland	2	0	2	0

=== Pool D ===
Australia	3	-	0	Finland
Netherlands	2	-	1	United States

Australia	3	-	0	Netherlands
Finland	2	-	1	United States

Australia	3	-	0	United States
Netherlands	2	-	1	Finland

Rank	Nation	Match	Won	Lost	Points
1	Australia	3	3	0	6
2	Netherlands	3	2	1	4
3	Finland	3	1	2	2
4	United States	3	0	3	0

=== Pool E ===
Canada	3	-	0	Hong Kong

Canada	3	-	0	Wales

Wales	3	-	0	Hong Kong

Rank	Nation	Match	Won	Lost	Points
1	Canada	2	2	0	4
2	Wales	2	1	1	2
3	Hong Kong	2	0	2	0

=== Pool F ===
Malaysia	2	-	1	Scotland
Pakistan	3	-	0	Spain

Malaysia	0	-	3	Pakistan
Scotland	3	-	0	Spain

Malaysia	2	-	1	Spain
Pakistan	2	-	1	Scotland

Rank	Nation	Match	Won	Lost	Points
1	Pakistan	3	3	0	6
2	Malaysia	3	2	1	4
3	Scotland	3	1	2	2
4	Spain	3	0	3	0

== Finals ==
=== Draw ===
Round of 16
Germany	0	2	3
8	Wales	3	3	0
5	Canada	3	3	2
10	India	0	0	0
9	Netherlands	0	2	0
7	Pakistan	3	3	2
6	Malaysia	3	3	0
12	South Africa	0	0	3

Quarterfinals
1	England	3	3	2
8	Wales	0	0	0
5	Canada	3	3	0
4	Australia	1	1	2
3	France	3	1	3
7	Pakistan	1	3	1
6	Malaysia	1	0
2	Egypt	3	3

Semifinals
1	England	3	0	3
5	Canada	0	3	0
3	France	0	3	1
2	Egypt	3	1	3

Final
1	England	3	3
2	Egypt	1	0

Third place match
5	Canada	0	3	0
3	France	3	2	3

=== Results ===
==== Quarter-finals ====
England
3
QUARTER FINAL
Islamabad, Pakistan
12 December 2005
Glass Court

Wales
0

			1	2	3	4	5
1	(England) (Wales)	N°1 James Willstrop; N°2 David Evans	9; 4	9; 7	9; 4
2	(England) (Wales)	N°3 Nick Matthew; N°3 Ricky Davies	9; 3	9; 2	9; 2
3	(England) (Wales)	N°2 Lee Beachill; N°1 Gavin Jones	9; 0	9; 5

Canada
2
QUARTER FINAL
Islamabad, Pakistan
12 December 2005
Glass Court

Australia
1

			1	2	3	4	5
1	(Canada) (Australia)	N°1 Jonathon Power; N°1 Anthony Ricketts	1; 9	9; 3	9; 4	9; 3
2	(Canada) (Australia)	N°3 Shahier Razik; N°3 Joseph Kneipp	1; 9	9; 7	9; 1	9; 5
3	(Canada) (Australia)	N°2 Graham Ryding; N°2 Stewart Boswell	3; 9	7; 9

France
2
QUARTER FINAL
Islamabad, Pakistan
12 December 2005
Glass Court

Pakistan
1

			1	2	3	4	5
1	(France) (Pakistan)	N°1 Thierry Lincou; N°1 Shahid Zaman	10; 8	9; 3	2; 9	9; 4
2	(France) (Pakistan)	N°3 Renan Lavigne; N°3 Farhan Mehboob	1; 9	6; 9	9; 4	5; 9
3	(France) (Pakistan)	N°2 Grégory Gaultier; N°2 Mansoor Zaman	9; 2	7; 9	9; 4	9; 1

Malaysia
0
QUARTER FINAL
Islamabad, Pakistan
12 December 2005
Glass Court

Egypt
2

			1	2	3	4	5
1	(Malaysia) (Egypt)	N°1 Mohd Azlan Iskandar; N°1 Amr Shabana	0; 9	10; 8	7; 9	4; 9
2	(Malaysia) (Egypt)	N°3 Mohd Nafiizwan Adnan; N°3 Mohammed Abbas	0; 9	0; 9	0; 9
3	(Malaysia) (Egypt)	N°2 Ong Beng Hee; N°2 Karim Darwish

==== Semi-finals ====
England
2
SEMI FINAL
Islamabad, Pakistan
13 December 2005
Glass Court

Canada
1

			1	2	3	4	5
1	(England) (Canada)	N°2 Peter Nicol; N°2 Graham Ryding	9; 4	9; 2	9; 6
2	(England) (Canada)	N°1 James Willstrop; N°1 Jonathon Power	3; 9	7; 9	4; 9
3	(England) (Canada)	N°3 Nick Matthew; N°3 Shahier Razik	10; 8	9; 2	9; 0

France
1
SEMI FINAL
Islamabad, Pakistan
13 December 2005
Glass Court

Egypt
2

			1	2	3	4	5
1	(France) (Egypt)	N°2 Grégory Gaultier; N°2 Karim Darwish	3; 9	3; 9	4; 9
2	(France) (Egypt)	N°1 Thierry Lincou; N°1 Amr Shabana	0; 9	9; 6	9; 3	9; 8
3	(France) (Egypt)	N°3 Renan Lavigne; N°3 Wael El Hindi	9; 3	4; 9	6; 9	6; 9

==== Final ====
England
2
FINAL
Islamabad, Pakistan
14 December 2005
Glass Court

Egypt
0

			1	2	3	4	5
1	(England) (Egypt)	N°1 James Willstrop; N°1 Amr Shabana	4; 9	9; 6	9; 3	9; 1
2	(England) (Egypt)	N°3 Peter Nicol; N°3 Mohammed Abbas	9; 0	9; 2	9; 1
3	(England) (Egypt)	N°2 Lee Beachill; N°2 Karim Darwish

2005 WSF World Team Championship

England
3rd title

Team
James Willstrop - Lee Beachill - Peter Nicol - Nick Matthew

== Post-tournament team ranking ==
Position	Team	Result
1st	England	Champions
2nd	Egypt	Final
3rd	France	Semi-final
4th	Canada	Semi-final
5th	Australia	Quarter-final
6th	Malaysia	Quarter-final
7th	Pakistan	Quarter-final
8th	Wales	Quarter-final

Position	Team	Result
9th	South Africa	Round of 16
10th	Germany	Round of 16
11th	India	Round of 16
12th	Netherlands	Round of 16
13th	United States	Group Stage
14th	Scotland	Group Stage
15th	New Zealand	Group Stage
16th	Kuwait	Group Stage

Position	Team	Result
17th	Spain	Group Stage
18th	Finland	Group Stage
19th	(Republic of Ireland) Ireland	Group Stage
20th	Iran	Group Stage
21st	Hong Kong	Group Stage
22nd	Austria	Group Stage

== See also ==
- World Team Squash Championships
- World Squash Federation
- 2005 Men's World Open Squash Championship

Preceded by Austria (Vienna); 2003	Squash World Team; Pakistan (Islamabad); 2005	Succeeded by India (Chennai) 2007
