= 2004 European Squash Team Championships =

Squash tournament

- 32nd
- Location: (France) Rennes
- Date: 28 April – 1 May 2004
- Website europeansquash.com

Results
- Champions: Men England; Women England

The 2004 European Squash Team Championships was the 32nd edition of European Squash Team Championships for squash players. The event was held in Rennes, France, from 28 to 1 May 2004. The tournament was organised by the European Squash Federation.

The England men's team won their 29th title and the England women's team won their 27th title.

== Men's tournament ==
=== Group stage ===
Group A

Pos	Team	P	W	D	L	Pts
1	England	3	3	0	0	6
2	Netherlands	3	2	0	1	4
3	Sweden	3	0	1	2	1
4	Denmark	3	0	1	2	1

Group B

Pos	Team	P	W	D	L	Pts
1	France	3	3	0	0	6
2	Wales	3	2	0	1	4
3	Spain	3	0	1	2	1
4	(Republic of Ireland) Ireland	0	0	1	2	1

=== Semi-finals ===
England
4
Semi-final 1

Wales
0

			1	2	3	4	5
1	(England) (Wales)	Peter Nicol; Alex Gough	0; 6	9; 0	9; 0
2	(England) (Wales)	Lee Beachill; David Evans	9; 3	9; 0
3	(England) (Wales)	James Willstrop; Greg Tippings	9; 2	9; 4	9; 7
4	(England) (Wales)	Adrian Grant; Ricky Davies	9; 2	9; 2	9; 0

France
4
Semi-final 2

Netherlands
0

			1	2	3	4	5
1	(France) (Netherlands)	Thierry Lincou; Tommy Berden	9; 3	8; 9	9; 1	9; 4
2	(France) (Netherlands)	Grégory Gaultier; Laurens Jan Anjema	9; 7	9; 5
3	(France) (Netherlands)	Renan Lavigne; Lucas Buit	0; 9	9; 2				retired
4	(France) (Netherlands)	Laurent Elriani; Dylan Bennett	9; 0	9; 2	9; 7

=== Third place ===
Wales
4

Netherlands
0

			1	2	3	4	5
1	(Wales) (Netherlands)	Alex Gough; Laurens Jan Anjema	9; 3	10; 8
2	(Wales) (Netherlands)	David Evans; Dylan Bennett	9; 0	9; 0
3	(Wales) (Netherlands)	Gavin Jones; Gabor Marges	9; 5	9; 2	9; 5
4	(Wales) (Netherlands)	Ricky Davies; Marc Reus	9; 4	9; 4	9; 1

=== Final ===
England
3
Final

France
1

			1	2	3	4	5
1	(England) (France)	Peter Nicol; Thierry Lincou	9; 3	9; 1	9; 3
2	(England) (France)	Lee Beachill; Grégory Gaultier	6; 9	6; 9
3	(England) (France)	Nick Matthew; Renan Lavigne	9; 0	9; 4	9; 5
4	(England) (France)	James Willstrop; Jean-Michel Arcucci	9; 1	9; 0	9; 5

== Women's tournament ==
=== Group stage ===
Group A

Pos	Team	P	W	L	Pts
1	England	3	3	0	6
2	France	3	2	1	4
3	Denmark	3	1	2	2
4	Germany	3	0	3	0

Group B

Pos	Team	P	W	L	Pts
1	Netherlands	3	3	0	6
2	Belgium	3	2	1	4
3	(Republic of Ireland) Ireland	3	1	2	2
4	Scotland	3	0	3	0

=== Semi-finals ===
England
3
Semi-final 1

Belgium
0

			1	2	3	4	5
1	(England) (Belgium)	Cassie Jackman; Kim Hannes	9; 3	9; 1	9; 1
2	(England) (Belgium)	Linda Charman; Katline Cauwels	9; 1	9; 0	9; 0
3	(England) (Belgium)	Jenny Duncalf; Charlie De Rycke	9; 6	9; 4	9; 3

Netherlands
3
Semi-final 2

France
0

			1	2	3	4	5
1	(Netherlands) (France)	Vanessa Atkinson; Isabelle Stoehr	9; 5	9; 5	9; 7
2	(Netherlands) (France)	Annelize Naudé; Laurence Bois	9; 0	9; 0
3	(Netherlands) (France)	Karen Kronemeyer; Corinne Castets	9; 3	9; 3

=== Third place ===
France
2
'

Belgium
0

			1	2	3	4	5
1	(France) (Belgium)	Isabelle Stoehr; Kim Hannes	9; 6	10; 8	1; 9	9; 4
2	(France) (Belgium)	Laurence Bois; Katline Cauwels	5; 9	7; 9
3	(France) (Belgium)	Corinne Castets; Charlie De Rycke	10; 8	9; 7	7; 9	9; 2

=== Final ===
England
3
Final

Netherlands
0

			1	2	3	4	5
1	(England) (Netherlands)	Cassie Jackman; Vanessa Atkinson	9; 6	9; 4	10; 9
2	(England) (Netherlands)	Linda Charman; Annelize Naudé	9; 4	9; 2
3	(England) (Netherlands)	Vicky Botwright; Karen Kronemeyer	9; 3	9; 4	9; 1
