= 2002 European Squash Team Championships =

Squash tournament

- 30th
- Location: (Germany) Boblingen
- Date: 1 – 4 May 2002
- Website europeansquash.com

Results
- Champions: Men England; Women England

The 2002 European Squash Team Championships was the 30th edition of European Squash Team Championships for squash players. The event was held in Boblingen, Germany, from 1 to 4 May 2002. The tournament was organised by the European Squash Federation.

The England men's team won their 27th title and the England women's team won their 25th title.

== Men's tournament ==
=== Group stage ===
Group A

Pos	Team	P	W	D	L	Pts
1	England	3	3	0	0	6
2	Wales	3	2	0	1	4
3	Scotland	3	1	0	2	2
4	Switzerland	3	0	0	3	0

Group B

Pos	Team	P	W	D	L	Pts
1	France	3	3	0	0	6
2	Netherlands	3	2	0	1	4
3	Germany	3	1	0	2	2
4	Finland	3	0	0	3	0

=== Semi-finals ===
England
3
Semi-final 1

Netherlands
1

			1	2	3	4	5
1	(England) (Netherlands)	Chris Walker; Tommy Berden	9; 1	9; 6	9; 0
2	(England) (Netherlands)	Mark Chaloner; Lucas Buit	9; 4	9; 3
3	(England) (Netherlands)	Lee Beachill; Dylan Bennett	9; 1	9; 0	9; 1
4	(England) (Netherlands)	Paul Johnson; Laurens Jan Anjema	9; 2	5; 9	6; 9	7; 9

France
4
Semi-final 2

Wales
0

			1	2	3	4	5
1	(France) (Wales)	Thierry Lincou; David Evans	9; 1	9; 4	9; 2
2	(France) (Wales)	Renan Lavigne; Gavin Jones	7; 9	9; 3	9
3	(France) (Wales)	Grégory Gaultier; Scott Fitzgerald	9; 1	9; 2	9; 2			retired
4	(France) (Wales)	Jean-Michel Arcucci; Greg Tippings	9; 2	9; 3	9; 3

=== Third place ===
Wales
4

Netherlands
0

			1	2	3	4	5
1	(Wales) (Netherlands)	Scott Fitzgerald; Gabor Marges	9; 3	9; 2	9; 4
2	(Wales) (Netherlands)	Gavin Jones; Marc Reus	5; 9	9; 4	9; 7	9; 0
3	(Wales) (Netherlands)	David Evans; Tommy Berden	9; 2	9; 2
4	(Wales) (Netherlands)	Alex Gough; Lucas Buit	9; 2	4; 9	9; 0	8; 10	9; 4

=== Final ===
England
2 (8)
Final

France
2 (7)

			1	2	3	4	5
1	(England) (France)	Chris Walker; Thierry Lincou	4; 9	5; 9	9; 10
2	(England) (France)	Mark Chaloner; Renan Lavigne	9; 0	10; 8	9; 0
3	(England) (France)	Lee Beachill; Grégory Gaultier	3; 9	9; 2	9; 5
4	(England) (France)	Del Harris; Jean-Michel Arcucci	9; 2	9; 3	5; 9	5; 9	2; 9

== Women's tournament ==
=== Group stage ===
Group A

Pos	Team	P	W	L	Pts
1	England	3	3	0	6
2	Germany	3	2	1	4
3	Netherlands	3	1	2	2
4	(Republic of Ireland) Ireland	3	0	3	0

Group B

Pos	Team	P	W	L	Pts
1	Scotland	3	3	0	6
2	Denmark	3	2	1	4
3	France	3	1	2	2
4	Switzerland	3	0	3	0

=== Semi-finals ===
England
3
Semi-final 1

Denmark
0

			1	2	3	4	5
1	(England) (Denmark)	Cassie Campion; Ellen Hamburg	9; 6	10; 8	9; 0
2	(England) (Denmark)	Linda Charman-Smith; Line Hansen	9; 1	9; 2	9; 0
3	(England) (Denmark)	Stephanie Brind; Matte Jorgensen	9; 0	9; 0	9; 0

Scotland
2
Semi-final 2

Germany
1

			1	2	3	4	5
1	(Scotland) (Germany)	Pamela Nimmo; Sabine Tillman	6; 9	9; 6	4; 9
2	(Scotland) (Germany)	Senga Macfie; Karin Beriere	9; 1	9; 2	9; 10	9; 3
3	(Scotland) (Germany)	Wendy Maitland; Kathrin Rohrmuller	3; 9	9; 3	9; 5	9; 7

=== Third place ===
Germany
2

Denmark
1

			1	2	3	4	5
1	(Germany) (Denmark)	Kathin Rohrmuller; Line Hansen	7; 9	9; 10	9; 5	4; 9
2	(Germany) (Denmark)	Sabine Tillman; Ellen Petersen	10; 8	9; 7	2; 9	9; 3
3	(Germany) (Denmark)	Karin Beriere; Julie Dorn Jensen	9; 5	9; 3	9; 3

=== Final ===
England
3
Final

Scotland
0

			1	2	3	4	5
1	(England) (Scotland)	Cassie Campion; Pamela Nimmo	9; 7	9; 5	9; 2
2	(England) (Scotland)	Linda Charman-Smith; Senga Macfie	9; 6	9; 4
3	(England) (Scotland)	Stephanie Brind; Wendy Maitland	9; 2	10; 8	9; 0
