= Wales men's national squash team =

Wales
- Association: Squash Wales
- Colors: Red and black

World Team Championships
- First year: 1983
- Titles: 0
- Runners-up: 1
- Best finish: 2nd

European Team Championships
- Titles: 0
- Runners-up: 1
- Best finish: 2nd

The Wales men's national squash team represents Wales in international squash team competitions, and is governed by Squash Wales.

Since 1983, Wales has participated in one final of the World Squash Team Open in 1999.

== Current team ==
- Emyr Evans
- Rhys Evans
- Oliver Jones
- Joel Makin
- Owain Taylor

== Results ==
=== World Team Squash Championships ===
Year	Result	Position	W	L	Team	Ref
(New Zealand) Auckland 1983	Group Stage	11th	5	4	Adrian Davies, Hugh Evans, Cerryg Jones, Teifion Salisbury	
(England) London 1987	Group Stage	13th	3	5	Adrian Davies, Andrew Evans, Cerryg Jones, Teifon Salisbury	
(Pakistan) Karachi 1993	Group Stage	14th	4	1	Adrian Davies, Gareth Davies, Alex Gough	
(Egypt) Cairo 1995	Group Stage	9th	5	1	Jeff Dark, Gareth Davies, David Evans, Alex Gough	
(Malaysia) Petaling Jaya 1997	Group Stage	12th	1	5	Gareth Davies, David Evans, Alex Gough	
(Egypt) Cairo 1999	Final	2nd	3	3	David Evans, Alex Gough, Gavin Jones, Greg Tippings	
(Australia) Melbourne 2001	Round of 16	9th	5	2	David Evans, Alex Gough, Gavin Jones, Greg Tippings	
(Austria) Vienna 2003	Quarter Final	5th	6	1	David Evans, Alex Gough, Gavin Jones	
(Pakistan) Islamabad 2005	Quarter Final	8th	2	4	Ricky Davies, David Evans, Alex Gough, Gavin Jones	
(India) Chennai 2007	Round of 16	10th	5	2	Jethro Binns, David Evans, Alex Gough, Rob Sutherland	
(Denmark) Odense 2009	Group Stage	21st	2	3	Jethro Binns, Nic Birt, Peter Creed, Rob Sutherland	
(France) Marseille 2017	Round of 16	14th	2	4	Peter Creed, Emyr Evans, David Haley, Joel Makin	
(United States) Washington, D.C. 2019	Semi-final	3rd	4	2	Peter Creed, Emyr Evans, Joel Makin, Owain Taylor	
(New Zealand) Tauranga 2023	Quarter-final	5th	4	2	Elliott Morris Devred, Emyr Evans, Joel Makin, Owain Taylor	

=== European Squash Team Championships ===
Year	Result	Position	Team
(Scotland) Edinburgh 1973	semi-final	4th	James Beattie, Robert Dolman, Mike Griffiths, Willie de Lloyd, Peter Stokes
(Sweden) Stockholm 1974	semi-final	4th	James Beattie, Ian Carlisle, Robert Dolman, Mike Griffiths, Willie de Lloyd
(Republic of Ireland) Dublin 1975	group stage	5th	Ian Carlisle, Robert Dolman, David Jude, C Morgan, Peter Wilson
(Belgium) Brussels 1976	group stage	5th	
(England) Sheffield 1977	group stage	6th	Ian Carlisle, Robert Dolman, David Jude, Peter Stokes, Peter Wilson
(Netherlands) Amsterdam 1978	group stage	7th	Ted Carter, Mike Davies, Robet Dolman, Nick Hale, David Jude, David Phillips, Peter Wilson
(Germany) Hamburg 1979	group stage	6th	Robert Dolman, Nick Hale, David Jude, Michael Phillips, Peter Wilson
(Finland) Helsinki 1980	semi-final	4th	Robert Dolman, David Jude, Peter Rice, Teifion Salisbury, Peter Wilson
(Netherlands) Amsterdam 1981	group stage	6th	Nick Hale, Cerryg Jones, David Jude, Peter Rice, Teifion Salisbury
(Wales) Cardiff 1982	group stage	5th	Adrian Davies, Nick Hale, Cerryg Jones, Peter Rice, Teifion Salisbury
(Germany) Munich 1983	semi-final	3rd	Adrian Davies, Hugh Evans, Jonathan Evans, Cerryg Jones, Teifion Salisbury
(Republic of Ireland) Dublin 1984	group stage	7th	Andrew Evans, Hugh Evans, Jonathan Evans, Cerryg Jones, Teifion Salisbury, Alan Williams
(Spain) Barcelona 1985	quarter-final		Adrian Davies, Jonathan Evans, Teifion Salisbury
(Austria) Vienna 1987	quarter-final	5th	Adrian Davies, Andrew Evans, Jonathan Evans, Cerryg Jones, Teifion Salisbury, Alan Williams
(Netherlands) Warmond 1988	semi-final	4th	Adrian Davies, Andrew Evans, William Griffiths, Cerryg Jones, Teifion Salisbury
(Switzerland) Zürich 1990	division 2	1st	Adrian Davies, Mark Davies, Andrew Evans, Alex Gough, Gary Cairns
(Germany) Gelsenkirchen 1991	group stage		Jeff Dark, Adrian Davies, Gareth Davies, Andrew Evans, Alex Gough
(France) Aix-en-Provence 1992	group stage		Jeff Dark, Adrian Davies, Gareth Davies, Alex Gough, Cerryg Jones
(France) Aix-en-Provence 1993	division 2	10th	Jeff Dark, Adrian Davies, Gareth Davies, David Evans, Michael Joint
(Germany) Zoetermeer 1994	group stage	7th	Jeff Dark, Adrian Davies, Gareth Davies, David Evans, Alex Gough
(Netherlands) Amsterdam 1995	group stage	5th	Jeff Dark, Gareth Davies, David Evans, Alex Gough
(Netherlands) Amsterdam 1996	group stage	5th	Jeff Dark, Matthew Benjamin, Gareth Davies, David Evans, Alex Gough
(Denmark) Odense 1997	Final	2nd	Matthew Benjamin, Gareth Davies, David Evans, Alex Gough
(Finland) Helsinki 1998	semi-final	3rd	Gareth Davies, David Evans, Alex Gough, Greg Tippings
(Austria) Linz 1999	semi-final	3rd	Matthew Benjamin, Gareth Davies, David Evans, Alex Gough, Greg Tippings
(Austria) Vienna 2000	semi-final	4th	David Evans, Alex Gough, Gavin Jones, Greg Tippings
(Netherlands) Eindhoven 2001	semi-final	4th	David Evans, Alex Gough, Gavin Jones, Greg Tippings
(Germany) Böblingen 2002	semi-final	3rd	David Evans, Scott Fitzgerald, Alex Gough, Gavin Jones, Greg Tippings
(England) Nottingham 2003	semi-final	3rd	David Evans, Scott Fitzgerald, Alex Gough, Gavin Jones, Greg Tippings
(France) Rennes 2004	semi-final	3rd	Ricky Davies, David Evans, Alex Gough, Gavin Jones, Greg Tippings
(Netherlands) Amsterdam 2005	semi-final	4th	Jethro Binns, Ricky Davies, David Evans, Alex Gough, Gavin Jones
(Austria) Vienna 2006	semi-final	4th	Jethro Binns, David Evans, Alex Gough, Gavin Jones, Rob Sutherland
(Italy) Riccione 2007	semi-final	4th	Jethro Binns, Nic Birt, Ricky Davies, Alex Gough, Rob Sutherland
(Netherlands) Amsterdam 2008	group stage	5th	Jethro Binns, David Evans, Alex Gough, Rob Sutherland
(Sweden) Malmö 2009	semi-final	3rd	Jethro Binns, Nic Birt, Peter Creed, Rob Sutherland
(France) Aix-en-Provence 2010	semi-final	4th	Jethro Binns, Nic Birt, Peter Creed, Lewys Hurst
(Finland) Espoo 2011	group stage	7th	Nic Birt, Peter Creed, David Evans, Alex Gough, David Haley
(Germany) Nuremberg 2012	division 2	6th	Nic Birt, Peter Creed, Jordan Davies, Sam Fenwick, David Haley
(Netherlands) Amsterdam 2013	division 2	3rd	Peter Creed, Scott Fitzgerald, David Haley, Joel Makin
(Italy) Riccione 2014	division 2	2nd	Peter Creed, David Evans, Scott Fitzgerald, David Haley, Joel Makin
(Denmark) Herning 2015	group stage	6th	Peter Creed, Emyr Evans, Scott Fitzgerald, David Haley, Joel Makin
(Poland) Warsaw 2016	division 2	3rd	Peter Creed, Emyr Evans, David Haley, Joel Makin, Owain Taylor
(Finland) Helsinki 2017	division 2	1st	Peter Creed, Emyr Evans, David Haley, Joel Makin, Elliott Morris
(Poland) Wrocław 2018	group stage	6th	Peter Creed, Emyr Evans, David Haley, Joel Makin, Elliott Morris
(England) Birmingham 2019	group stage	5th	Peter Creed, Emyr Evans, Joel Makin, Elliott Morris, Owain Taylor
(Netherlands) Eindhoven 2022	group stage	5th	Peter Creed, Emyr Evans, Joel Makin, Elliott Morris
(Finland) Helsinki 2023	semi-final	4th	Peter Creed, Emyr Evans, Joel Makin, Owain Taylor
(Switzerland) Uster 2024	semi-final	4th	Emyr Evans, Rhys Evans, Joel Makin, Elliott Morris, Owain Taylor
(Poland) Wrocław 2025	quarter-final	8th	Rhys Evans, Joel Makin, Elliott Morris, Ioan Sharpe, Owain Taylor
(Netherlands) Amsterdam 2026	quarter-final	5th	Emyr Evans, Rhys Evans, Oliver Jones, Joel Makin, Owain Taylor
Total	x1 - x7		

Note

- Division 2 is the second tier of the Championship, with the aim of teams being promotion (no medals are awarded).

== See also ==
- Squash Wales
- World Team Squash Championships
- Welsh National Squash Championships
- Wales women's national squash team
