= Netherlands national squash team =

Netherlands national squash team may refer to:

- Netherlands men's national squash team
- Netherlands women's national squash team
