= French Squash Federation =

Sports governing body in France

Fédération française de Squash
- Sport: Squash
- Abbreviation: FFSquash
- Founded: December 22nd, 1980
- Regional affiliation: European Squash Federation
- Location: St-Maur-des-Fosses, Île de France
- President: Julien Muller
- Vice president(s): Catherine Ezvan; Dominique Fontanon
- Secretary: Thierry de Contet
- Men's coach: Renan Lavigne
- Women's coach: Philippe Signoret

Official website
- www.ffsquash.com
- (France)

French Squash Federation ("Fédération Française de Squash" in French), also known as the FFSquash, is an organisation set up in 1980 that takes charge of the organisation, co-ordination and promotion of squash in France. It is recognised by the World Squash Federation and by the French Minister for Sports.

== See also ==
- France men's national squash team
- France women's national squash team
- French Junior Open Squash
- 2013 Men's World Team Squash Championships
- 2012 Women's World Team Squash Championships
- Open International de Squash de Nantes
