= Emyr Evans =

Welsh squash player (born 1996)

Personal information
- Nationality: British (Welsh)
- Born: 25 November 1996 (age 29) Cardiff, Wales

Sport
- Racquet used: Dunlop

men's singles
- Highest ranking: 65 (April 2025)
- Current ranking: 81 (March 2026)
- Title: 3
Medal record
Men's squash
Representing Wales
World Team Championships
Bronze medal – third place	2019 Washington D.C.	Team
Welsh National Championships
Gold medal – first place	2025	singles

Emyr Evans (born 25 November 1996) is a Welsh male squash player. He reached a career high ranking of 65 in the world during April 2025. He has represented Wales at the Commonwealth Games and is a Welsh national champion.

== Biography ==
Evans won a bronze medal at the 2019 Men's World Team Squash Championships after reaching the semi-finals, where Wales lost to eventual champions Egypt.

Evans represented the Welsh team at the 2022 Commonwealth Games in Birmingham, England, where he participated in the men's singles and men's doubles with Peter Creed.

In 2025, Evans became the Welsh champion after winning the title at the Welsh National Squash Championships.

In March 2026, he won his third PSA title after securing victory in the Odense Open during the 2025–26 PSA Squash Tour.
