= Tania Bailey =

English squash player (born 1979)

Personal information
- Nationality: British (English)
- Born: 2 October 1979 (age 46) Stamford, Lincs, England

Sport
- Handedness: Right
- Turned pro: 1998
- Coached by: Paul Carter & David Pearson
- Retired: 2012
- Racquet used: Dunlop Hot Melt Custom Pro

Women's singles
- Highest ranking: No. 4 (March 2003)
Medal record
Women's squash
Representing England
World Championships
Bronze medal – third place	2007 Madrid	Singles
World Team Championships
Gold medal – first place	2000 Sheffield	Team
Gold medal – first place	2006 Edmonton	Team
Silver medal – second place	2002 Odense	Team
Silver medal – second place	2008 Cairo	Team
Silver medal – second place	2010 Palmerston North	Team
Commonwealth Games
Silver medal – second place	2002 Manchester	Doubles
Bronze medal – third place	2006 Melbourne	Doubles
European Team Championships
Gold medal – first place	1999 Linz	Team
Gold medal – first place	2000 Vienna	Team
Gold medal – first place	2001 Eindhoven	Team
Gold medal – first place	2006 Vienna	Team
Gold medal – first place	2007 Riccione	Team
Gold medal – first place	2009 Malmö	Team
Bronze medal – third place	2010 Aix-en-Provence	Team

Tania Ann Bailey (born 2 October 1979) is a retired professional squash player from England. She reached a career high ranking of 4 in the world during March 2003.

== Biography ==
As a junior player, Bailey won the World Junior Championship in 1997 and captained the England team to World and European junior team titles. A car accident led to a career-threatening knee injury at the age of 21, but she successfully recovered after surgery and resumed her playing career.

Her greatest achievement was being part of the England team that won the 2000 Women's World Team Squash Championships held in Sheffield and later the 2006 Women's World Team Squash Championships in Edmonton, Canada.

Bailey represented the 2002 England team at the 2002 Commonwealth Games in Manchester, England. She competed in the singles and doubles and won a silver medal in the doubles partnering Cassie Jackman.

In 2003, Bailey finished runner-up to Sarah Fitz-Gerald at the British Open. She reached a career-high ranking of World No. 4 that year. In February 2006, Bailey clinched her first British National Championships in Manchester, defeating the No.1 seed and previous champion Linda Elriani 3–1 in a hotly contested 76-minute final.

Bailey won a bronze medal in the women's doubles event at the 2006 Commonwealth Games in Melbourne, Australia, partnering Vicky Botwright.

In 2010, she was part of the English team that won the silver medal at the 2010 Women's World Team Squash Championships.

Bailey won seven gold medals for the England women's national squash team at the European Squash Team Championships from 1999 to 2010.

== Major world series final appearances ==
=== British Open ===
Outcome	Year	Opponent in the final	Score in the final
Runner-up	2002	(Australia) Sarah Fitz-Gerald	9–3, 9–0, 9–0

=== Hong Kong Open ===
Outcome	Year	Opponent in the final	Score in the final
Runner-up	2006	(Malaysia) Nicol David	9–1, 10–8, 9-5

=== Malaysian Open ===
Outcome	Year	Opponent in the final	Score in the final
Runner-up	2006	(Malaysia) Nicol David	9–4, 9–6, 2-9 5–9, 9-3
Runner-up	2007	(Malaysia) Nicol David	9–4, 9–3, 9-2

== See also ==
- Official Women's Squash World Ranking
