= Jesse Engelbrecht =

South African squash player (born 1983)

Personal information
- Born: 5 January 1983 (age 43) Durban, South Africa
- Years active: 2002-2010 (Zimbabwe 2002-2006), (South Africa 2007-2010)
- Website: www.jengelbrecht.net

Sport
- Country: South Africa/Zimbabwe
- Turned pro: 2002
- Racquet used: Prince O3 Speedport Black

Men's singles
- Highest ranking: 55 (August 2008)

Jesse Engelbrecht (born 5 January 1983 in Durban) is a retired South African male squash player who has also represented Zimbabwe formerly in international competitions including the 2002 Commonwealth Games.

== Biography ==
Jesse Engelbrecht was born in Durban but settled in Zimbabwe for a while as his grandparents and parents lived in Zimbabwe. He applied for the South African citizenship in 2007 in international squash competitions.

== Career ==
He made his international debut in the 2002 PSA World Tour for Zimbabwe. He also represented Zimbabwe at the 2002 Commonwealth Games and competed in the Men's singles and Men's doubles squash events. He later moved to South Africa and competed for South Africa at the international level including the 2007 Men's World Team Squash Championships, 2008 Men's British Open Squash Championship and 2009 Men's World Team Squash Championships as a part of 2009 PSA World Tour. Jesse retired from professional squash career in 2010 and started his coaching career soon after his retirement. He is currently residing in England and has been running a Squash Academy called Jengelbrecht.
