= Austria Squash Rackets =

Sports governing body in Austria

Österreichischer Squash Rackets Verband
- Sport: Squash
- Founded: 1978
- Regional affiliation: European Squash Federation
- Location: Vienna
- President: Thomas Wachter
- Secretary: Michael Khan
- Coach: David Huck

Official website
- www.squash.or.at
- (Austria)

Austria Squash Rackets (German: Österreichischer Squash Rackets Verband) is the national organisation for squash in Austria.

== See also ==
- Austria men's national squash team
