= Australia men's national squash team =

Australia
- Coach: Stewart Boswell
- Association: Squash Australia
- Colors: Green & Gold

World Team Championships
- First year: 1967
- Titles: 8 (2003-2001-1991-1989- 1973-1971-1969-1967)
- Runners-up: 3
- Best finish: 1st
- Entries: 26

The Australia Men's National Squash Team represents Australia in international squash team competitions, and is governed by Squash Australia.

Since 1967, Australia has won 8 World Squash Team Open titles. Their most recent title came in 2003.

== Current team ==
- Cameron Pilley
- Ryan Cuskelly
- Rex Hedrick
- Zac Alexander

== Results ==
=== World Team Squash Championships ===
Year	Result	Position	W	L
(Australia) Melbourne 1967	Champions	1st	5	0
(England) Birmingham 1969	Champions	1st	5	0
(New Zealand) Palmerston North 1971	Champions	1st	6	0
(South Africa) Johannesburg 1973	Champions	1st	4	0
(England) Birmingham 1976	Group Stage	3rd	4	2
(Canada) Toronto 1977	Group Stage	5th	3	4
(Australia) Brisbane 1979	Semi Final	3rd	6	2
(Sweden) Stockholm 1981	Final	2nd	6	1
(New Zealand) Auckland 1983	Semi Final	3rd	7	2
(Egypt) Cairo 1985	Semi Final	3rd	7	2
(England) London 1987	Semi Final	4th	6	2
Singapore 1989	Champions	1st	8	0
(Finland) Helsinki 1991	Champions	1st	5	0
(Pakistan) Karachi 1993	Final	2nd	4	1
(Egypt) Cairo 1995	Semi Final	4th	4	2
(Malaysia) Petaling Jaya 1997	Semi Final	3rd	5	1
(Egypt) Cairo 1999	Semi Final	4th	4	2
(Australia) Melbourne 2001	Champions	1st	7	0
(Austria) Vienna 2003	Champions	1st	7	0
(Pakistan) Islamabad 2005	Quarter Final	5th	5	1
(India) Chennai 2007	Final	2nd	5	1
(Denmark) Odense 2009	Semi Final	3rd	5	1
(Germany) Paderborn 2011	Semi Final	3rd	6	1
(France) Mulhouse 2013	Semi Final	4th	4	2
(Egypt) Cairo 2015	Cancelled			
(France) Marseille 2017	Semi Final	3rd	5	1
(United States) Washington, D.C. 2019	Round of 16	10th	3	3
Total	26/26	8 Titles	136	31

== See also ==
- Squash Australia
- Squash in Australia
- Australia women's national squash team
