= Dutch Squash Federation =

Dutch organisation

Squash Bond Nederland
- Sport: Squash
- Founded: November 1938
- Regional affiliation: European Squash Federation
- Location: Zoetermeer
- Chairman: Frits de Leeuw
- Secretary: Joan van Belzen
- Men's coach: Lucas Buit
- Women's coach: Nicole Beumer

Official website
- www.squash.nl
- (Netherlands)

Dutch Squash Federation ("Squash Bond Nederland" in Dutch) is the national organisation for squash in the Netherlands. The organisation was founded in 1938 and is a member of the European Squash Federation and the World Squash Federation.

Around 7,000 players are affiliated with the organisation.

== See also ==
- Netherlands men's national squash team
- Netherlands women's national squash team
