= Canada men's national squash team =

Canada
- Coach: Yvon Provencal, Martin Heath
- Association: Squash Canada
- Colors: Red

World Team Championships
- First year: 1971
- Titles: 0
- Runners-up: 1
- Best finish: 2nd
- Entries: 23

The Canada men's national squash team represents Canada in international squash team competitions, and is governed by Squash Canada.

Since 1971, Canada participated in one final of the World Squash Team Open, in 1997.

== Current team ==
- Nick Sachvie
- Shawn Delierre
- Andrew Schnell
- Michael Mehl
- Rahul Sehrawat
- Michael McCue
- David Baillargeon
- Abdur-Rahman Rana

== Results ==
=== World Team Squash Championships ===
| Year | Result | Position | W | L |
|---|---|---|---|---|
| (Australia) Melbourne 1967 | Did not present | | | |
| (England) Birmingham 1969 | Did not present | | | |
| (New Zealand) Palmerston North 1971 | Group Stage | 7th | 0 | 6 |
| (South Africa) Johannesburg 1973 | Did not present | | | |
| (England) Birmingham 1976 | Group Stage | 8th | 2 | 5 |
| (Canada) Toronto 1977 | Group Stage | 7th | 1 | 6 |
| (Australia) Brisbane 1979 | Group Stage | 8th | 3 | 5 |
| (Sweden) Stockholm 1981 | Group Stage | 9th | 4 | 2 |
| (New Zealand) Auckland 1983 | Group Stage | 8th | 2 | 7 |
| (Egypt) Cairo 1985 | Group Stage | 7th | 5 | 4 |
| (England) London 1987 | Quarter Final | 8th | 3 | 4 |
| Singapore 1989 | Quarter Final | 8th | 2 | 6 |
| (Finland) Helsinki 1991 | Group Stage | 9th | 3 | 3 |
| (Pakistan) Karachi 1993 | Group Stage | 12th | 3 | 3 |
| (Egypt) Cairo 1995 | Quarter Final | 6th | 4 | 2 |
| (Malaysia) Petaling Jaya 1997 | Final | 2nd | 5 | 1 |
| (Egypt) Cairo 1999 | Quarter Final | 6th | 2 | 4 |
| (Australia) Melbourne 2001 | Quarter Final | 8th | 4 | 3 |
| (Austria) Vienna 2003 | Quarter Final | 6th | 4 | 2 |
| (Pakistan) Islamabad 2005 | Semi Final | 4th | 4 | 2 |
| (India) Chennai 2007 | Quarter Final | 6th | 4 | 2 |
| (Denmark) Odense 2009 | Quarter Final | 8th | 3 | 3 |
| (Germany) Paderborn 2011 | Round of 16 | 14th | 4 | 3 |
| (France) Mulhouse 2013 | Round of 16 | 11th | 4 | 3 |
| (Egypt) Cairo 2015 | Cancelled | | | |
| (France) Marseille 2017 | Round of 16 | 13th | 3 | 3 |
| (United States) Washington, D.C. 2019 | Group Stage | 14th | 3 | 3 |
| Total | 23/26 | 0 Title | 72 | 82 |

== See also ==
- Squash Canada
- World Team Squash Championships
- Canada women's national squash team
