= Farukh Khan =

Pakistani politician

Member of the National Assembly of Pakistan
- Incumbent
- Assumed office 29 February 2024
- Constituency: Reserved seat for women
- In office 13 August 2018 – 10 August 2023
- Constituency: Reserved seat for women

Personal details
- Party: PML(Q) (2018-present)

Farukh Khan is a Pakistani politician who was a member of the National Assembly of Pakistan from August 2018 to August 2023.

== Political career ==
She was elected to the National Assembly of Pakistan as a candidate of Pakistan Muslim League (Q) (PML-Q) on a reserved seat for women from Punjab in the 2018 Pakistani general election.
