= András Török =

Hungarian squash player (born 1978)

Personal information
- Born: 7 September 1978 (age 47) Budapest, Hungary
- Years active: 8
- Height: 1.93 m (6 ft 4 in)
- Weight: 76 kg (168 lb)

Sport
- Country: Hungary
- Turned pro: 1999
- Coached by: Sjef Van Der Heiden
- Retired: Active
- Racquet used: Dunlop

Men's singles
- Highest ranking: No. 73 (June 2000)
- Updated on July, 2013

András Török (born 7 September 1978) is a professional squash player who represented Hungary. He reached a career-high world ranking of World No. 73 in June 2000. He has been an 8-times Hungarian national champion.
