= Lee Beachill =

English squash player

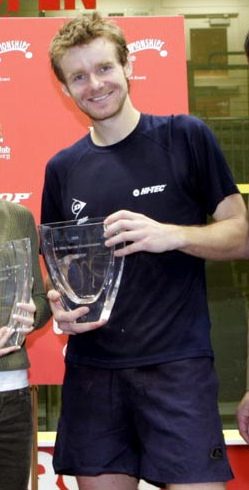
- Lee Beachill with his 2005 US Open trophy

Personal information
- Nationality: British (English)
- Born: 28 November 1977 (age 48) Huddersfield, England
- Height: 1.82 m (6 ft 0 in)
- Weight: 76 kg (168 lb)

Sport
- Handedness: Right Handed
- Turned pro: 1998
- Coached by: Malcolm Willstrop
- Retired: 2009
- Racquet used: Dunlop

Men's singles
- Highest ranking: No. 1 (October 2004)
- Title: 8
- Tour final: 13
- World Open: F (2004)
Medal record
Men's squash
Representing England
World Championships
Silver medal – second place	2004 Doha	Singles
World Team Championships
Gold medal – first place	2005 Islamabad	Team
Gold medal – first place	2007 Chennai	Team
Bronze medal – third place	2001 Melbourne	Team
Bronze medal – third place	2003 Vienna	Team
Commonwealth Games
Gold medal – first place	2002 Manchester	Doubles
Gold medal – first place	2006 Melbourne	Doubles
Bronze medal – third place	2006 Melbourne	Singles
European Team Championships
Gold medal – first place	1999 Linz	Team
Gold medal – first place	2001 Eindhoven	Team
Gold medal – first place	2002 Böblingen	Team
Gold medal – first place	2003 Nottingham	Team
Gold medal – first place	2004 Rennes	Team
Gold medal – first place	2005 Amsterdam	Team
Gold medal – first place	2006 Vienna	Team
Gold medal – first place	2007 Riccione	Team
Gold medal – first place	2008 Amsterdam	Team

Lee Beachill (born 28 November 1977) is a former World No. 1 squash player from England.

== Biography ==
Beachill attended Horbury School, Horbury and first played the game at the Skelmanthorpe Squash Club in Yorkshire under the guidance of coach Chris Beck. As a junior player, Beachill helped England win the World Junior Team Championship in 1997, and was the British champion at under-12, under-14, under-17 and under-19 levels.

He reached the World No. 1 ranking in October 2004. He also finished runner-up at the World Open that year.

Beachill was part of the English team which won the World Team Squash Championships in 2005. He also represented the 2002 England team at the 2002 Commonwealth Games in Manchester, England. He competed in the singles and doubles and won a gold medal, partnering Peter Nicol. Four years later at the 2006 Commonwealth Games, he partnering Peter Nicol again when they successfully defended their Commonwealth title.

Beachill won the British National Squash Championships three times – in 2001, 2002 and 2005 and won nine gold medals for the England men's national squash team at the European Squash Team Championships from 1999 to 2008.

Beachill announced his retirement from the game in February 2009 after undergoing hernia surgery.

== Major results ==
=== World Open final appearances ===
Outcome	Year	Location	Opponent in the final	Score in the final
Runner-up	2004	Doha, Qatar	(France) Thierry Lincou	5–11, 11–2, 2–11, 12–10, 11–8

== World Series final appearances ==
Qatar Classic

Outcome	Year	Opponent in the final	Score in the final
Winner	2003	(Scotland) John White	15–12, 15–5, 11–15, 12–15, 15–9

US Open

Outcome	Year	Opponent in the final	Score in the final
Winner	2004	(England) Peter Nicol	11–8, 11–9, 11–9
Winner	2005	(Australia) David Palmer	11–7, 9–11, 8–11, 11–1, 11–8

Sporting positions
Preceded by Peter Nicol	World No. 1 October 2004 – December 2004	Succeeded by Thierry Lincou
