= Sebastiaan Weenink =

Dutch squash player (born 1986)

Personal information
- Born: 27 August 1986 (age 39) Rotterdam, Netherlands
- Height: 1.87 m (6 ft 2 in)
- Weight: 78 kg (172 lb)

Sport
- Country: Netherlands
- Turned pro: 2007
- Retired: Active
- Racquet used: Prince

Men's singles
- Highest ranking: No. 82 (Feb 2015)
- Current ranking: No. 82 (Feb 2015)
- Updated on Feb 2015

Sebastiaan Weenink (born 27 August 1986 in Rotterdam) is a professional squash player from the Netherlands. He reached a career-high world ranking of World No. 82 in the February 2015.
