= Bart Ravelli =

Dutch squash player (born 1987)

Personal information
- Born: 16 November 1987 (age 38) Heemstede, Netherlands
- Height: 1.83 m (6 ft 0 in)
- Weight: 78 kg (172 lb)

Sport
- Country: Netherlands
- Turned pro: 2007
- Retired: Active
- Racquet used: Prince

Men's singles
- Highest ranking: No. 123 (July, 2011)
- Current ranking: No. 254 (June, 2013)
- Updated on June, 2013

Bart Ravelli (born 16 November 1987 in Heemstede) is a professional squash player from the Netherlands. He reached a career-high world ranking of World No. 123 in the July 2011.
