= Matthew Giuffre =

Canadian squash player (born 1982)

Personal information
- Born: June 8, 1982 (age 44) Edmonton, Alberta, Canada

Sport
- Country: Canada
- Turned pro: 2001
- Retired: ?
- Racquet used: Harrow

Men's singles
- Highest ranking: No. 38 (1 August 2006)
- Updated on February, 2018

Matthew Giuffre (born June 8, 1982) is a Canadian former professional squash player. He reached a career high of 38 in the world. He represented his country in the 2006 Commonwealth Games.
