= Clinton Leeuw =

South African squash player (born 1982)

Personal information
- Born: 15 April 1982 (age 44) Cape Town, South Africa
- Height: 1.72 m (5 ft 8 in)
- Weight: 81 kg (179 lb)

Sport
- Country: South Africa
- Turned pro: 2006
- Retired: Active
- Racquet used: Grays

Men's singles
- Highest ranking: No. 79 (May 2013)
- Current ranking: No. 86 (June 2013)
- Title: 2
- Tour final: 6
- Updated on June 2013

Clinton Leeuw (born 15 April 1982 in Cape Town) is a professional squash player who represents South Africa. He reached a career-high world ranking of World No. 79 in May 2013.
