= Arthur Gaskin (squash player) =

Irish squash player (born 1985)

Personal information
- Nationality: Irish
- Born: 16 January 1985 (age 41) Dublin, Ireland
- Height: 1.85 m (6 ft 1 in)
- Weight: 75 kg (165 lb)

Sport
- Turned pro: 2004
- Retired: Retired
- Racquet used: Tecnifibre

Men's singles
- Highest ranking: No. 60 (June 2009)
- Title: 4
- Tour final: 13 National Champion = 8 National Finals = 11 Irish ranking = 1, 2009 – 2021
Medal record
Irish Championships
Gold medal – first place	2011, 2013–20	singles

Arthur Gaskin (born 16 January 1985) is a professional squash player who represented Ireland. He reached a career-high world ranking of World No. 60 in June 2009 and was an eight-time champion of Ireland.

== Biography ==
Gaskin won eight national titles at the Irish National Squash Championships, from his first in 2011 to his eighth and last in 2020.

Gaskin regularly wrote about his experiences on the blog of SportsShoes.com.

In October 2024, Arthur was appointed as the head coach of Squash Ireland.
