= Matias Tuomi =

Finnish squash player (born 1985)

Personal information
- Born: 30 September 1985 (age 40) Espoo, Finland
- Height: 1.78 m (5 ft 10 in)
- Weight: 63 kg (139 lb)

Sport
- Country: Finland
- Turned pro: 2006
- Coached by: Ari Pelkonen & Mika Monto
- Retired: Active
- Racquet used: Dunlop

Men's singles
- Highest ranking: No. 117 (July 2014)
- Current ranking: No. 127 (August 2015)
- Updated on August 2015

Matias Tuomi (born 30 September 1985 in Espoo) is a professional squash player who represents Finland. He reached a career-high world ranking of World No. 117 in July 2014.
