= Piëdro Schweertman =

Dutch squash player (born 1983)

Personal information
- Nickname: The Iceman
- Born: 5 September 1983 (age 43) Vlissingen, Netherlands
- Years active: 26
- Height: 1.84 m (6 ft 0 in)

Sport
- Country: Netherlands
- Handedness: Left Handed
- Coached by: Kim van den Bosch
- Racquet used: Karakal Raw 130

Men's singles
- Highest ranking: No. 63 (August 2015)
- Current ranking: No.1 Holland
- Updated on August 2015

Piëdro Schweertman (born 5 September 1983, in Vlissingen) is a professional squash player from the Netherlands. He reached a career-high world ranking of World No. 63 in August 2015.
