= John Rooney (squash player) =

Irish squash player (born 1979)

Personal information
- Nationality: Irish
- Born: 20 October 1979 (age 46) Galway, Ireland
- Weight: 80 kg (176 lb)

Sport
- Handedness: Right Handed
- Turned pro: 1998
- Retired: Active
- Racquet used: Dunlop

Men's singles
- Highest ranking: No. 52 (Oct, 2004)
Medal record
Men's squash
Representing Ireland
Irish Championships
Gold medal – first place	2009, 2010	singles

John Rooney (born 20 October 1979) is a former professional squash player and a former Irish number 1. His highest world ranking was 52 and he was twice champion of Ireland.

== Biography ==
Rooney lost in the finals of the 2008 Irish National Squash Championships to Liam Kenny before winning back to back titles in 2010 and 2011.

He represented the Ireland men's national squash team at the European Squash Team Championships.

He was named as an assistant squash coach at Yale University in August 2011. After leaving Yale, he coached at the Tennis and Squash Club in Buffalo, NY and is now the Head Squash Professional at the University Club of Chicago in Chicago, IL. He is now coaching top ranked juniors at the University Club of Chicago, such as Zaid Khan, Gaurav Shekhawat, and Peter Grissom who are climbing up the junior rankings.
