= David Evans (squash player) =

Welsh squash player (born 1974)

Personal information
- Nationality: British (Welsh)
- Born: 24 October 1974 (age 51) Pontypool, Wales
- Height: 6 ft 3 in (1.91 m)

Sport
- Racquet used: Prince O3 Ozone Tour

Men's Singles
- Highest ranking: 3 (February 2001)
Medal record
Men's squash
Representing Wales
World Team Championships
Silver medal – second place	1999 Cairo	Team
European Team Championships
Silver medal – second place	1997 Odense	Team
Bronze medal – third place	1998 Helsinki	Team
Bronze medal – third place	1999 Linz	Team
Bronze medal – third place	2002 Boblingen	Team
Bronze medal – third place	2003 Nottingham	Team
Bronze medal – third place	2004 Rennes	Team
British Open Championships
Gold medal – first place	2000	singles
National Championships
Gold medal – first place	1994–99, 2003–04	singles

David Evans (born 24 October 1974) is a former professional squash player from Wales who competed at four Commonwealth Games from 1998 to 2014. He reached a career-high world ranking of world No. 3 in 2001 and won the British Open.

== Biography ==
Evans is 6 ft 3, bringing a height and reach advantage to his game. He only took up the sport seriously at 16 years of age.

Evans was an eight-time Welsh national champion, winning the title every year from 1994 to 1999 and again from 2003 and 2004. The feat remained a men's record until Peter Creed won a 9th title in 2019.

Evans represented the 1998 Welsh team at the 1998 Commonwealth Games in Kuala Lumpur, Malaysia, where he competed in the squash events. He reached the quarter-final after victories over Damian Tam and Simon Parke before losing to Jonathon Power of Canada.

He won the British Open in 2000, beating Paul Price of Australia in the final 15-11, 15-6, 15-10.

Two years later Gough attended a second Commonwealth Games after being selected for the 2002 Welsh team at the 2002 Commonwealth Games in Manchester, England, where he competed in the squash events. In the singles he was eliminated in the last 16 by England's Lee Beachill.

A third Commonwealth Games ensued at the 2006 Commonwealth Games in Melbourne, Australia and Evans reached the quarter-finals of the men's doubles with Alex Gough. With no Welsh squash team at the 2010 Commonwealth Games, Evans missed the opportunity to go to another games but in 2014 was able to attend a fourth and final games for the Welsh team at the 2014 Glasgow games. He performed well reaching the quarter-finals of the men's doubles with Peter Creed.
