= Peter Creed =

Welsh squash player (born 1987)

Personal information
- Nationality: British (Welsh)
- Born: 31 March 1987 (age 39) Caerphilly, Wales
- Height: 1.63 m (5 ft 4 in)
- Weight: 60 kg (130 lb)

Sport
- Turned pro: 2007
- Coached by: David Evans
- Retired: Active
- Racquet used: Head

Men's singles
- Highest ranking: No. 50 (November 2018)
- Title: 8
Medal record
Men's squash
Representing Wales
World Team Championships
| Bronze medal – third place | 2019 Washington D.C. | Team |
World Doubles Championships
| Bronze medal – third place | 2017 Manchester | Mixed doubles |
National Championships
| Gold medal – first place | 2010–15, 2017–19 | singles |

Peter Creed (born 31 March 1987) is a former professional squash player who represented Wales. He reached a career-high world ranking of World No. 50 in November in 2018 competed in three Commonwealth Games and represented Wales more than 150 times and has won a record nine Welsh national titles.

== Biography ==
Creed attended Millfield School.

Creed represented the Welsh team at the 2014 Commonwealth Games in Glasgow, Scotland in the men's singles, the men's doubles and mixed doubles. Partnering David Evans the pair reached the quarter-finals in the doubles. Four years later he attended a second games when participating for the 2018 Welsh team at the 2018 Commonwealth Games in Gold Coast. In the mixed doubles event with Tesni Evans he reached another quarter-final.

Creed won a bronze medal at the 2019 Men's World Team Squash Championships after reaching the semi-finals, where Wales lost to eventual champions Egypt. The same year he won his ninth consecutive Welsh national Championship. A third Commonwealth Games appearance ensued for Wales at the 2022 Commonwealth Games in Birmingham.

In 2026 he was the Director of Squash at Bryant Park in New York.
