= Gavin Jones (squash player) =

Welsh squash player (born 1980)

Personal information
- Nationality: British (Welsh)
- Born: 1 February 1980 (age 46) Maesteg, Wales

Sport
- Turned pro: 1999
- Retired: yes

Men's singles
- Highest ranking: No. 37 (December 2005)
Medal record
World Team Championships
Silver medal – second place	1999 Cairo	Team
European Team Championships
Bronze medal – third place	2002 Boblingen	Team
Bronze medal – third place	2004 Rennes	Team
National Championships
Gold medal – first place	2005	singles

Gavin Jones (born 1 February 1980) is a former professional squash player who represented Wales at two Commonwealth Games. He reached a career high of 37 in the world in December 2005.

== Biography ==
Jones' career highlight was winning a silver medal at the 1999 Men's World Team Squash Championships in Cairo.

Jones represented the 2002 Welsh team at the 2002 Commonwealth Games in Manchester, England, where he competed in three squash events. He reached the quarter-finals of the mixed doubles partnering Karen Hargreaves.

In November 2005, Jones won the Welsh national title.

The following year, a second Commonwealth Games ensued for the Welsh team at the 2006 Commonwealth Games in Melbourne, Australia. He reached the last 16 of the men's singles losing to James Willstrop of England and also progressed to the quarter-finals of the mixed doubles with Tegwen Malik.
