= Rob Sutherland =

Welsh squash player (born 1985)

Personal information
- Born: 16 June 1985 (age 41) Newport, Wales
- Height: 181 cm (5 ft 11 in)

Sport
- Country: Wales
- Turned pro: 2004
- Racquet used: e-squash

Men's singles
- Highest ranking: 67 (December 2009)

Rob Sutherland (born 16 June 1985) is a former Welsh male squash player. He was part of the 2009 PSA World Tour competing in the 2009 Men's World Team Squash Championships. He achieved his highest career ranking of 67 in December 2009.
