= Netherlands men's national squash team =

Netherlands
- Coach: Lucas Buit
- Association: Dutch Squash Federation
- Colors: Orange

World Team Championships
- First year: 1981
- Titles: 0
- Runners-up: 0
- Best finish: 6th
- Entries: 16

European Team Championships
- Titles: 0
- Runners-up: 1
- Best finish: 2nd

The Netherlands men's national squash team represents the Netherlands in international squash team competitions, and is governed by Dutch Squash Federation.

The Netherlands' best result at the World Squash Team Open since 1981 has been reaching the quarter-finals in 2007.

== Current team ==
- Laurens Jan Anjema
- Dylan Bennett
- Sebastiaan Weenink
- Bart Ravelli
- Marc Ter Sluis

== Results ==
=== World Team Squash Championships ===
Year	Result	Position	W	L
(Australia) Melbourne 1967	Did not present			
(England) Birmingham 1969	Did not present			
(New Zealand) Palmerston North 1971	Did not present			
(South Africa) Johannesburg 1973	Did not present			
(England) Birmingham 1976	Did not present			
(Canada) Toronto 1977	Did not present			
(Australia) Brisbane 1979	Did not present			
(Sweden) Stockholm 1981	Group Stage	15th	3	5
(New Zealand) Auckland 1983	Did not present			
(Egypt) Cairo 1985	Group Stage	11th	6	3
(England) London 1987	Group Stage	10th	5	3
Singapore 1989	Group Stage	13th	2	6
(Finland) Helsinki 1991	Group Stage	6th	4	2
(Pakistan) Karachi 1993	Group Stage	11th	1	4
(Egypt) Cairo 1995	Group Stage	17th	3	3
(Malaysia) Petaling Jaya 1997	Group Stage	14th	4	2
(Egypt) Cairo 1999	Group Stage	19th	3	3
(Australia) Melbourne 2001	Round of 16	14th	3	3
(Austria) Vienna 2003	Round of 16	11th	3	3
(Pakistan) Islamabad 2005	Round of 16	12th	2	4
(India) Chennai 2007	Quarter Final	7th	4	3
(Denmark) Odense 2009	Round of 16	14th	2	4
(Germany) Paderborn 2011	Round of 16	9th	4	3
(France) Mulhouse 2013	Group Stage	18th	4	3
(Egypt) Cairo 2015	Cancelled			
(France) Marseille 2017	Did not present			
(United States) Washington, D.C. 2019	Did not present			
Total	16/26	0 Title	53	54

=== European Squash Team Championships ===
Year	Result	Position
(Scotland) Edinburgh 1973	Not in the Top 4	
(Sweden) Stockholm 1974	Not in the Top 4	
(Republic of Ireland) Dublin 1975	Not in the Top 4	
(Belgium) Brussels 1976	Not in the Top 4	
(England) Sheffield 1977	Not in the Top 4	
(Netherlands) Amsterdam 1978	Not in the Top 4	
(Germany) Hamburg 1979	Not in the Top 4	
(Finland) Helsinki 1980	Not in the Top 4	
(Netherlands) Amsterdam 1981	Not in the Top 4	
(Wales) Cardiff 1982	Not in the Top 4	
(Germany) Munich 1983	Semi Final	4th
(Republic of Ireland) Dublin 1984	Not in the Top 4	
(Spain) Barcelona 1985	Semi Final	4th
(France) Aix-en-Provence 1986	Not in the Top 4	
(Austria) Vienna 1987	Not in the Top 4	
(Netherlands) Warmond 1988	Not in the Top 4	
(Finland) Helsinki 1989	Not in the Top 4	
(Switzerland) Zürich 1990	Not in the Top 4	
(Germany) Gelsenkirchen 1991	Semi Final	4th
(France) Aix-en-Provence 1992	Not in the Top 4	
(France) Aix-en-Provence 1993	Not in the Top 4	
(Germany) Zoetermeer 1994	Not in the Top 4	
(Netherlands) Amsterdam 1995	Not in the Top 4	
(Netherlands) Amsterdam 1996	Not in the Top 4	
(Denmark) Odense 1997	Not in the Top 4	
(Finland) Helsinki 1998	Not in the Top 4	
(Austria) Linz 1999	Not in the Top 4	
(Austria) Vienna 2000	Not in the Top 4	
(Netherlands) Eindhoven 2001	Not in the Top 4	
(Germany) Böblingen 2002	Semi Final	4th
(England) Nottingham 2003	Semi Final	4th
(France) Rennes 2004	Semi Final	4th
(Netherlands) Amsterdam 2005	Semi Final	3rd
(Austria) Vienna 2006	Semi Final	3rd
(Italy) Riccione 2007	Final	2nd
(Netherlands) Amsterdam 2008	Semi Final	3rd
(Sweden) Malmö 2009	Semi Final	4th
(France) Aix-en-Provence 2010	Semi Final	3rd
(Finland) Espoo 2011	Semi Final	4th
(Germany) Nuremberg 2012	Not in the Top 4	
(Netherlands) Amsterdam 2013	Not in the Top 4	
(Italy) Riccione 2014	Not in the Top 4	
(Denmark) Herning 2015	Not in the Top 4	
(Poland) Warsaw 2016	Not in the Top 4	
(Finland) Helsinki 2017	Not in the Top 4	
(Poland) Wrocław 2018	Not in the Top 4	
(England) Birmingham 2019	Not in the Top 4	
Total	x1 - x4	

== See also ==
- Dutch Squash Federation
- World Team Squash Championships
- Netherlands women's national squash team
