= Netherlands women's national squash team =

Netherlands
- Nickname: Oranje
- Coach: Ronny Vlassaks, Natalie Grinham
- Association: Dutch Squash Federation
- Colors: Orange

World Team Championships
- First year: 1981
- Titles: 0
- Runners-up: 0
- Best finish: 4th
- Entries: 16

European Team Championships
- Titles: 1
- Runners-up: 12
- Best finish: 1st

The Netherlands women's national squash team represents the Netherlands in international squash team competitions, and is governed by Dutch Squash Federation.

Since 1981, the Netherlands has participated in two semi-finals of the World Squash Team Open, in 1992 and 2006. In 2010, the Netherlands won the European Squash Team Championships.

== Current team ==
- Natalie Grinham
- Milou van der Heijden
- Tessa ter Sluis
- Milja Dorenbos

== Past team ==
- Vanessa Atkinson
- Annelize Naudé
- Margriet Huisman
- Orla Noom
- Karen Kronenmeyer
- Milja Dorenbos

== Results ==
=== World Team Squash Championships ===
Year	Result	Position	W	L
(England) Birmingham 1979	Did not present			
(Canada) Toronto 1981	Group Stage	12th	2	5
(Australia) Perth 1983	Did not present			
(Republic of Ireland) Dublin 1985	Group Stage	8th	2	6
(New Zealand) Auckland 1987	Group Stage	8th	3	5
(Netherlands) Warmond 1989	Quarter Final	7th	2	3
(Australia) Sydney 1990	Group Stage	7th	2	3
(Canada) Vancouver 1992	Semi Final	4th	2	4
(England) Guernsey 1994	Group Stage	5th	4	2
(Malaysia) Petaling Jaya 1996	Quarter Final	6th	2	4
(Germany) Stuttgart 1998	Quarter Final	6th	2	4
(England) Sheffield 2000	Round of 16	14th	2	4
(Denmark) Odense 2002	Quarter Final	5th	5	2
(Netherlands) Amsterdam 2004	Quarter Final	6th	4	3
(Canada) Edmonton 2006	Semi Final	4th	4	2
(Egypt) Cairo 2008	Quarter Final	7th	3	3
(New Zealand) Palmerston North 2010	Group Stage	9th	4	2
(France) Nîmes 2012	Round of 16	10th	3	3
(Canada) Niagara-on-the-Lake 2014	Did not present			
(France) Issy-les-Moulineaux 2016	Group Stage	12th	1	5
Total	17/20	0 Title	47	60

== See also ==
- Dutch Squash Federation
- World Team Squash Championships
- Netherlands men's national squash team
