= France men's national squash team =

Men's national squash team representing France

France
- Coach: Renan Lavigne
- Association: French Squash Federation
- Colors: White & Blue

World Team Championships
- First year: 1981
- Titles: 0
- Runners-up: 2
- Best finish: 2nd
- Entries: 20

European Team Championships
- Titles: 3
- Runners-up: 19
- Best finish: 1st

The France men's national squash team represents France in international squash team competitions, and is governed by the French Squash Federation.

Since 1981, France has participated in two finals of the World Squash Team Open.

== Current team ==
- Grégory Gaultier
- Grégoire Marche
- Mathieu Castagnet
- Lucas Serme
- Baptiste Masotti
- Victor Crouin

== Results ==
=== World Team Squash Championships ===
Year	Result	Position	W	L
(Sweden) Stockholm 1981	Group Stage	17th	3	4
(New Zealand) Auckland 1983	Did not present			
(Egypt) Cairo 1985	Group Stage	14th	2	7
(England) London 1987	Group Stage	12th	3	5
Singapore 1989	Group Stage	12th	1	7
(Finland) Helsinki 1991	Group Stage	13th	3	2
(Pakistan) Karachi 1993	Group Stage	15th	2	4
(Egypt) Cairo 1995	Group Stage	11th	4	2
(Malaysia) Petaling Jaya 1997	Group Stage	13th	3	3
(Egypt) Cairo 1999	Quarter Final	7th	4	2
(Australia) Melbourne 2001	Quarter Final	5th	5	2
(Austria) Vienna 2003	Final	2nd	6	1
(Pakistan) Islamabad 2005	Semi Final	3rd	4	1
(India) Chennai 2007	Semi Final	3rd	6	1
(Denmark) Odense 2009	Final	2nd	5	1
(Germany) Paderborn 2011	Semi Final	4th	5	2
(France) Mulhouse 2013	Semi Final	3rd	6	1
(Egypt) Cairo 2015	Cancelled			
(France) Marseille 2017	Quarter Final	5th	5	1
(United States) Washington, D.C. 2019	Semi Final	3rd	5	1
(New Zealand) Tauranga 2023	Semi Final	3rd	4	1
Hong Kong 2024	Semi Final	3rd	4	1
Total	20/28	0 Title	80	49

=== European Squash Team Championships ===
Year	Result	Position
(Scotland) Edinburgh 1973	Not in the Top 4	
(Sweden) Stockholm 1974	Not in the Top 4	
(Republic of Ireland) Dublin 1975	Not in the Top 4	
(Belgium) Brussels 1976	Not in the Top 4	
(England) Sheffield 1977	Not in the Top 4	
(Netherlands) Amsterdam 1978	Not in the Top 4	
(Germany) Hamburg 1979	Not in the Top 4	
(Finland) Helsinki 1980	Not in the Top 4	
(Netherlands) Amsterdam 1981	Not in the Top 4	
(Wales) Cardiff 1982	Not in the Top 4	
(Germany) Munich 1983	Not in the Top 4	
(Republic of Ireland) Dublin 1984	Not in the Top 4	
(Spain) Barcelona 1985	Not in the Top 4	
(France) Aix-en-Provence 1986	Not in the Top 4	
(Austria) Vienna 1987	Not in the Top 4	
(Netherlands) Warmond 1988	Not in the Top 4	
(Finland) Helsinki 1989	Not in the Top 4	
(Switzerland) Zürich 1990	Not in the Top 4	
(Germany) Gelsenkirchen 1991	Not in the Top 4	
(France) Aix-en-Provence 1992	Not in the Top 4	
(France) Aix-en-Provence 1993	Semi Final	3rd
(Germany) Zoetermeer 1994	Semi Final	4th
(Netherlands) Amsterdam 1995	Not in the Top 4	
(Netherlands) Amsterdam 1996	Not in the Top 4	
(Denmark) Odense 1997	Semi Final	4th
(Finland) Helsinki 1998	Semi Final	4th
(Austria) Linz 1999	Not in the Top 4	
(Austria) Vienna 2000	Final	2nd
(Netherlands) Eindhoven 2001	Final	2nd
(Germany) Böblingen 2002	Final	2nd
(England) Nottingham 2003	Final	2nd
(France) Rennes 2004	Final	2nd
(Netherlands) Amsterdam 2005	Final	2nd
(Austria) Vienna 2006	Final	2nd
(Italy) Riccione 2007	Semi Final	3rd
(Netherlands) Amsterdam 2008	Final	2nd
(Sweden) Malmö 2009	Final	2nd
(France) Aix-en-Provence 2010	Final	2nd
(Finland) Espoo 2011	Final	2nd
(Germany) Nuremberg 2012	Final	2nd
(Netherlands) Amsterdam 2013	Final	2nd
(Italy) Riccione 2014	Final	2nd
(Denmark) Herning 2015	Champions	1st
(Poland) Warsaw 2016	Final	2nd
(Finland) Helsinki 2017	Champions	1st
(Poland) Wrocław 2018	Champions	1st
(England) Birmingham 2019	Semi Final	4th
(Netherlands) Eindhoven 2022	Final	2nd
(Finland) Helsinki 2023	Final	2nd
(Switzerland) Uster 2024	Final	2nd
(Poland) Wrocław 2025	Final	2nd
(Netherlands) Amsterdam 2026	Semi Final	3rd
Total	x3 - x19 - x3	

== See also ==
- French Squash Federation
- World Team Squash Championships
- France women's national squash team
