= Alex Gough (squash player) =

Welsh squash player (born 1970)

Personal information
- Nationality: British (Welsh)
- Born: 8 December 1970 (age 55) Newport, Wales
- Height: 1.70 m (5 ft 7 in)

Sport
- Turned pro: 1993
- Coached by: Chris Robertson
- Retired: 2008
- Racquet used: Dunlop Hot Melt Pro
- Highest ranking: 5 (July 1998)
- World Open: QF (2007)
Medal record
Men's squash
Representing Wales
World Championships
Bronze medal – third place	1997 Petaling Jaya	Singles
World Team Championships
Silver medal – second place	1999 Cairo	Team
Commonwealth Games
Bronze medal – third place	1998 Kuala Lumpur	Doubles
European Team Championships
Silver medal – second place	1997 Odense	Team
Bronze medal – third place	1998 Helsinki	Team
Bronze medal – third place	1999 Linz	Team
Bronze medal – third place	2002 Boblingen	Team
Bronze medal – third place	2003 Nottingham	Team
Bronze medal – third place	2004 Rennes	Team
National Championships
Gold medal – first place	2001–02, 2005, 2006, 2008	singles

Alex Gough (born 8 December 1970) is a former professional squash player from Wales who competed at three Commonwealth Games from 1998 to 2006. He reached a career-high world ranking of world No. 5 in 1998. He won a bronze medal in the men's singles at the 1998 Commonwealth Games.

== Biography ==
Gough was a five-time Welsh national champion, winning the title in 2001, 2002, 2005, 2006 and 2008.

In 1997 Gough became the first Welshman to reach the semi-finals of the world championships, seeded 14th at the 1997 Men's World Open Squash Championship, he defeated the English trio of Paul Gregory, Chris Walker and Mark Cairns on his way to the semis.

Gough represented the 1998 Welsh team at the 1998 Commonwealth Games in Kuala Lumpur, Malaysia, where he competed in the squash events. He won a bronze medal after victories over Tio Nkopane, Kenneth Low and Craig Wapnick before losing to Jonathon Power of Canada in the semi-finals.

Four years later Gough attended a second Commonwealth Games after being selected for the 2002 Welsh team at the 2002 Commonwealth Games in Manchester, England, where he competed in the squash events. In the singles he was eliminated in the last 16 by Australia's David Palmer.

A third Commonwealth Games ensued at the 2006 Commonwealth Games in Melbourne, Australia and Gough reached the quarter-finals of the men's doubles with David Evans.

Since retiring he went on to become the CEO of the Professional Squash Association (PSA).
