= Renan Lavigne =

French squash player (born 1974)

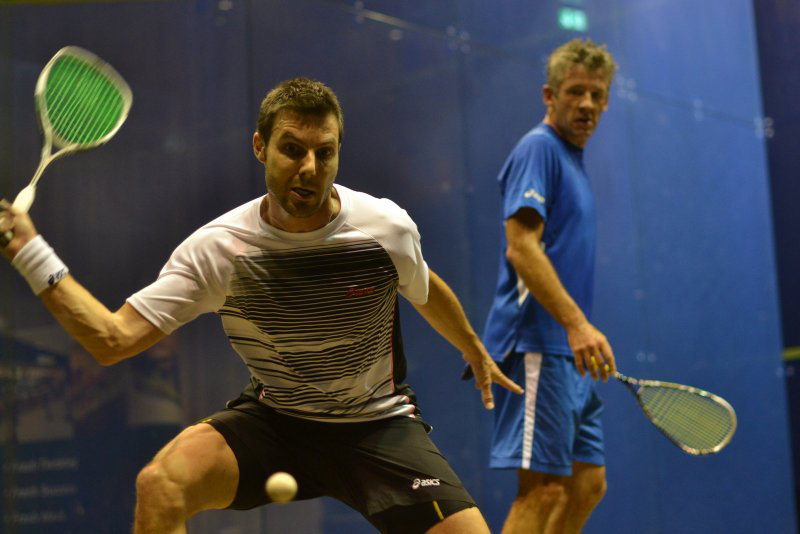

Personal information
- Born: 1 November 1974 (age 51) Longjumeau, France
- Height: 1.73 m (5 ft 8 in)
- Weight: 66 kg (146 lb)

Sport
- Country: France
- Handedness: Right
- Turned pro: 1996
- Coached by: Paul Sciberras
- Retired: 2010
- Racquet used: Wilson

Men's singles
- Highest ranking: 17 (October, 2004)
- Title: 9
- Tour final: 15
Medal record
Men's squash
Representing France
World Team Championships
Silver medal – second place	2003 Vienna	Team
Bronze medal – third place	2005 Islamabad	Team
Bronze medal – third place	2007 Chennai	Team
Silver medal – second place	2009 Odense	Team

Renan Lavigne (born 1 November 1974 in Longjumeau) is a professional squash player from France.

== Career statistics ==
Listed below.

=== PSA Titles (9) ===
All Results for Renan Lavigne in PSA World's Tour tournament

Legend PSA Platinum Series / PSA Series Final / PSA World Open (0) PSA Gold Series (0) PSA Silver Series (0) PSA Star Series (6) PSA Super Satellite (2) PSA Satellite (1)	Titles by Major Tournaments World Open (0) British Open (0) Hong Kong Open (0) Qatar Classic (0)

No.	Date	Tournament	Opponent in Final	Score in Final
1.	18 July 1999	Albuquerque Open	(England) Bradley Ball	12–15, 13–15, 15–9, 15–5, 15–9
2.	29 July 2000	Danish Open	(Finland) Juha Raumolin	15–8, 15–2, 15–1
3.	2 December 2000	Kenya Open	(England) Adrian Grant	15–10, 8–15, 15–12, 15–4
4.	19 August 2001	Colombian Open	(Egypt) Wael El Hindi	15–13, 15–0, 15–6
5.	18 August 2002	Colombian Open	(Australia) John Williams	17–16, 15–12, 14–17, 15–10
6.	23 November 2003	Valkyrie Club Open	(Malaysia) Mohd Azlan Iskandar	11–15, 15–10, 15–7, 15–10
7.	15 January 2006	Comfort Inn Open	(England) Joey Barrington	11–5, 11–10, 9–11, 6–11, 11–9
8.	10 September 2007	Fashion Tour	(Colombia) Miguel Ángel Rodríguez	11–10, 11–7, 10–11, 11–10
9.	6 January 2008	Open du Gard	(France) Mathieu Castagnet	11–10, 11–7, 11–9

=== PSA Tour Finals (Runner-Up) (6) ===
No.	Date	Tournament	Opponent in Final	Score in Final
1.	28 June 1998	Japan Open	(Scotland) Stuart Cowie	Unknown
2.	27 September 1998	Chicago Open	(Australia) Billy Haddrell	Unknown
3.	22 November 1998	South of England Open	(England) Tim Garner	Unknown
4.	7 August 1999	Exterieur Open	(France) Thierry Lincou	15–12, 15–12, 15–13
5.	21 January 2007	Comfort Inn Open	(Canada) Shahier Razik	8–11, 11–2, 11–7, 11–5
6.	8 October 2007	Berkshire Open	(Australia) Cameron Pilley	11–6, 11–9, 11–7
