= European Squash Federation =

European squash governing body

- Abbreviation: ESF
- Formation: 1973
- Type: Sports organization
- Headquarters: Barston, England
- Region served: Europe
- Members: 43 member associations
- President: (Sweden) Thomas Troedsson
- Vice-president: (Republic of Ireland) Rosie Barry (Portugal) Luis Ferreira (France) Catherine Ezvan (Norway) Otto Kalvo
- Treasurer: (England) Peter Derrick
- Parent organization: World Squash
- Website: europeansquash.com

The European Squash Federation (ESF) was set up in 1973 in order to develop and promote squash across Europe. It is based in Barston, West Midlands, in England. In 2011 it had 43 member federations.

== Presidents ==
No.	Years	Name
1	1973–1977	(Sweden) Lennart Lepsen
2	1977–1985	(Netherlands) Lou Zandvliet
3	1985–1989	(Republic of Ireland) Brian Fitzgerald
4	1989–1992	(Germany) Bernhard Woebker
5	1992–1993	(Netherlands) Casper Zeegers
6	1993–1999	(Republic of Ireland) Joyce Buckley
7	1999–2001	(Netherlands) Philip Van Der Ven
8	2001–2007	(England) Christopher Stahl
9	2007–2013	(Belgium) Hugo Hannes
10	2013–2019	(England) Zena Wooldridge
11	2019–2022	(Belgium) Hugo Hannes
12	2022–	(Sweden) Thomas Troedsson

== List of members ==
Nation	Federation	President
Armenia	Armenian National Squash Federation	Mikayel Vardanyan
Austria	Osterreichischer Squash Rackets	Thomas Wachter
Belgium	Belgian Squash Federation	Serge Maggi
Croatia	Croatian Squash Federation	Vedran Rezic
Cyprus	Cyprus Squash Rackets	George Yiapanas
Czech Republic	Czech Squash Association	Pavel Sladecek
Denmark	Dansk Squash Forbund	Tom Kjaerbye Larsen
England	England Squash	Jackie Robinson
Estonia	Estonian Squash Federation	Eino Vaarala
Finland	Finnish Squash Association	Leo Hatjasalo
France	French Squash Federation	Julien Muller
Germany	German Squash Association	Michael Gäde
Gibraltar	Gibraltar Squash Association	Barry Brindle
Greece	Greek Squash Rackets Federation	George Barletis
Hungary	Hungarian Squash Association	Balazs Welesz
Iceland	Iceland Squash	Hilmar H. Gunnarsson
Ireland	Irish Squash Federation	Ed Dunne
Isle of Man	Isle of Man Squash Rackets Association	Leslie Callow
Israel	Israel Squash Rackets Association	Opher Levy
Italy	Italian Squash Federation	Siro Zanella
Latvia	Latvian Squash Federation	Maris Macijevskis
Liechtenstein	Liechtenstein Squash Federation	Oliver Stahl
Lithuania	Lithuania Squash Federation	Edvinas Dovydaitis
Luxembourg	Fédération de Squash Luxembourgeoise	Steve Kaiser
Macedonia	Squash Federation of FYR Macedonia	Jane Vangelovski
Malta	Malta Squash	Liz Said
Monaco	Fédération Monegasque de Squash Racket	Bruno Fissore
Montenegro	Montenegrin Squash Association	Miso Pejkovic
Netherlands	Dutch Squash Federation	Hans Arends
Norway	Norges Squashforbund	Ida Sonju
Poland	Polish Squash Federation	Tomasz Banasiak
Portugal	Federacao Nacional de Squash	Luís Ferreira
Russia	Russian Squash Federation	Kirill Perov
Scotland	Scottish Squash and Racketball	Ron Pearman
Serbia	Serbian Squash Association	Čedomir Vitorović
Slovakia	Slovak Squash Association	Juraj Celler
Slovenia	Slovenian Squash Association	Tomaz Campa
Spain	Spanish Squash Federation	Rogelio Chantada Lago
Sweden	Swedish Squash Federation	Ulf Karlsson
Switzerland	Swiss Squash	Stefan Grundmann
Turkey	Turkish Badminton Federation	Ercan Yıldız
Ukraine	Ukraine Squash Federation	Roman Dolynych
Wales	Squash Wales	Alan James

== Events ==
Junior Events
European Junior Championships Under 19
Under 15 and 17 Team Championships
European Junior Circuit

Seniors' Events
European Squash Individual Championships
European Squash Team Championships
European Squash Club Championships

Masters' Events
European Masters Individual Championships
