= 1990 Men's British Open Squash Championship =

British Open Squash Championships
- 52nd British Open Championships

Details
- Location: London, England
- Venue: Lambs Squash Club & Wembley Conference Centre
- Dates: 16–23 April 1990

The 1990 Hi-Tec British Open Championships was held at the Lambs Squash Club with the later stages being held at the Wembley Conference Centre from 16–23 April 1990.
Jahangir Khan won his ninth consecutive title defeating Rodney Martin in the final. This ninth success by Khan set a new record beating the previous record held by Australian Geoff Hunt.

== Seeds ==
1. (Pakistan) Jahangir Khan
2. (Pakistan) Jansher Khan
3. (Australia) Chris Dittmar
4. (Australia) Chris Robertson
5. (Australia) Rodney Martin
6. (Pakistan) Mir Zaman Gul
7. (Pakistan) Umar Hayat Khan
8. (New Zealand) Ross Norman
9. (Australia) Brett Martin
10. (Australia) Rodney Eyles
11. (England) Del Harris
12. (Scotland) Mark Maclean
13. (England) Bryan Beeson
14. (England) Phil Kenyon
15. (New Zealand) Rory Watt
16. (Sweden) Fredrik Johnson

== Draw and results ==
=== First round ===
Player One	Player Two	Score
(Australia) Brett Newton	(Finland) Pentti Pekkanen	7-9 9-6 4-9 9-1 9-1
(England) Damian Walker	(Australia) Adam Schreiber	9-2 9-7 3-9 2-9 9-0
(England) Peter Marshall	(England) Danny Meddings	9-4 9-3 9-0
(England) Paul Carter	(New Zealand) Paul Steel	2-9 9-4 9-4 9-2
(England) Geoff Williams	(England) Robert Graham	9-3 9-1 9-3
(England) John Ransome	(Netherlands) Raymond Scheffer	9-3 9-4 9-1
(England) Jason Nicolle	(England) Luke Gojnic	9-2 9-2 10-8
(Sweden) Anders Wahlstedt	(Canada) Jamie Crombie	9-0 1-9 9-3 9-8
(England) Simon Taylor	(England) Mark Cairns	9-3 9-2 9-5
(England) Simon Parke	(England) Martin Bodimeade	9-1 9-2 9-3
(England) Paul Lord	(Australia) Michael Robberds	9-7 9-6 9-4
(England) Stephen Meads	(Pakistan) Sohail Qaiser	9-5 9-1 3-9 10-8
(West Germany) Simon Frenz	(Australia) Austin Adarraga	9-3 9-7 9-7
(Pakistan) Ghous Ur Rehman	(Scotland) Stuart Hailstone	3-9 5-9 10-8 9-7 9-1

=== Second round ===
Player One	Player Two	Score
(England) Nicolle	(Sweden) Wahlstedt	9-4 9-5 9-2
(Australia) Newton	(England) Taylor	3-9 9-3 9-6 9-2
(England) Walker D	(England) Parke	10-8 9-5 9-2
(England) Marshall	(England) Lord	9-5 9-2 9-1
(England) Carter	(England) Meads	10-9 7-9 3-9 9-7 9-3
(England) Williams	(West Germany) Frenz	9-3 9-3 9-2
(England) Ransome	(Pakistan) Ur Rehman	9-7 9-5 9-4
(South Africa) Craig Van der Wath	(England) Robert Owen	10-8 9-0 9-0

=== Main draw ===
Third round
1	(Pakistan) Jahangir Khan	9	9	9
(England) Jamie Hickox	4	2	5
(Finland) Sami Elopuro	9	9	3	9
13	(England) Bryan Beeson	7	4	9	7
(England) Jason Nicolle	3	9	9	9
8	(New Zealand) Ross Norman	9	2	6	7
14	(England) Phil Kenyon	9	10	9
(England) Phil Whitlock	2	8	1
3	(Australia) Chris Dittmar	9	9	9
(Wales) Adrian Davies	7	0	0
11	(England) Del Harris	10	9	2	3	9
(Australia) Brett Newton	8	4	9	9	0
(Australia) Tristan Nancarrow	5	9	9	9
6	(Pakistan) Mir Zaman Gul	9	3	1	6
12	(Scotland) Mark Maclean	8	9	9	9
(England) Damian Walker	10	1	1	3
5	(Australia) Rodney Martin	7	9	10	9
(England) Paul Gregory	9	4	8	5
10	(Australia) Rodney Eyles	9	9	0	9
(England) Hiddy Jahan	2	2	9	3
4	(Australia) Chris Robertson	9	9	9
(England) Paul Carter	7	4	2
9	(Australia) Brett Martin	2	10	2	9	9
(England) Peter Marshall	9	8	9	6	4
2	(Pakistan) Jansher Khan
(South Africa) Craig van der Wath
(England) John Ransome
16	(Sweden) Fredrik Johnson
(England) Chris Walker	9	9	9
15	(New Zealand) Rory Watt	3	5	7
(England) Geoff Williams	9	5	9	9
7	(Pakistan) Umar Hayat Khan	7	9	7	6

Fourth round
1	(Pakistan) Jahangir K	9	9	9
(Finland) Elopuro	6	2	0
(England) Nicolle	9	7	3	9	9
14	(England) Kenyon	5	9	9	4	1
3	(Australia) Dittmar	9	9	6	9
11	(England) Harris	4	1	9	2
(Australia) Nancarrow	9	9	3	9
12	(Scotland) Maclean	5	2	9	3
5	(Australia) R Martin	9	9	9	9
10	(Australia) Eyles	10	2	2	1
4	(Australia) Robertson	9	9	4	9	9
9	(Australia) B Martin	7	1	9	10	6
2	(Pakistan) Jansher K	9	9	9
(England) Ransome	4	5	1
(England) Walker	9	9	9
(England) Williams	7	0	0

Quarter-finals
1	(Pakistan) Jahangir K	9	9	4	9
(England) Nicolle	0	1	3
3	(Australia) Dittmar	9	9	9
(Australia) Nancarrow	0	1	1
5	(Australia) R Martin	9	9	6	9
4	(Australia) Robertson	2	5	9	4
2	(Pakistan) Jansher K	9	9	9
(England) Walker	1	1	1

Semi-finals
1	(Pakistan) Jahangir K	1	9	9	9
3	(Australia) Dittmar	6	6	5
Final
1	(Pakistan) Jahangir K	9	10	9
5	(Australia) R Martin	6	8	1
5	(Australia) R Martin	1	10	9	10
2	(Pakistan) Jansher K	9	8	0	9

Preceded by 1989	British Open Squash Championships; England (London); 1990	Succeeded by 1991
