= 1989 Men's British Open Squash Championship =

British Open Squash Championships
- 51st British Open Championships

Details
- Location: London, England
- Venue: Lambs Squash Club & Wembley Conference Centre
- Dates: 12–17 April 1989

The 1989 Hi-Tec British Open Championships was held at the Lambs Squash Club and the Wembley Conference Centre in London from 12–17 April 1989.
Jahangir Khan won his eighth consecutive title defeating Rodney Martin in the final. This eighth win equalled the record previously set by Geoff Hunt of Australia.

== Seeds ==
1. (Pakistan) Jahangir Khan
2. (Pakistan) Jansher Khan
3. (Australia) Chris Dittmar
4. (New Zealand) Ross Norman
5. (Australia) Rodney Martin
6. (Australia) Chris Robertson
7. (Pakistan) Umar Hayat Khan
8. (Australia) Brett Martin
9. (England) Del Harris
10. (England) Phil Kenyon
11. (Pakistan) Mir Zaman Gul
12. (Australia) Tristan Nancarrow
13. (Pakistan) Zarak Jahan Khan
14. (Scotland) Stuart Hailstone
15. (Australia) Rodney Eyles
16. (England) Jamie Hickox

== Draw and results ==
=== First round ===
Player One	Player Two	Score
(Sweden) Anders Wahlstedt	(England) Mark Cairns	9-3 9-5 10-8
(Australia) Geoff Hunt	(England) Tony Hands	9-6 9-7 2-9 9-1
(England) Neil Harvey	(England) David Poole	9-2 9-2 9-3
(Finland) Sami Elopuro	(England) Simon Parke	9-2 9-1 2-9 4-9 9-2
(England) Rob Owen	(Australia) Adam Schreiber	9-5 9-10 9-2 9-2
(South Africa) Craig Van der Wath	(Australia) Michael Robberds	9-7 9-7 4-9 9-0
(England) Paul Gregory	(Pakistan) Maqsood Ahmed	9-2 9-1 9-1
(Wales) Adrian Davies	(England) Damian Walker	9-4 9-3 3-9 5-9 10-8
(Australia) Mark Carlyon	(New Zealand) Rory Watt	9-7 9-4 9-4
(England) Martin Bodimeade	(Sweden) Fredrik Johnson	9-7 10-9 9-5 9-0
(England) Peter Marshall	(England) Danny Meddings	9-5 9-6 10-8
(Singapore) Peter Hill	(England) Luke Gojnic	9-7 9-7 4-9 5-9 9-2
(Scotland) Mark Maclean	(Egypt) Amir Wagih	9-2 10-9 9-3
(England) John Ransome	(Finland) Pentti Pekkanen	9-5 9-6 9-0
(England) Matt Oxley	(England) Phil Whitlock	9-6 9-7 6-9 9-7
(Egypt) Ahmed Taher	(Australia) Dean Mason	6-9 9-5 9-4 9-1

=== Second round ===
Player One	Player Two	Score
(Sweden) Wahlstedt	(Australia) Hunt	10-8 3-9 8-10 10-8 9-5
(Finland) Elopuro	(England) Harvey	9-4 9-2 9-1
(South Africa) Van der Wath	(England) Owen	9-3 9-6 4-9 9-7
(England) Gregory	(Wales) Davies	9-2 3-9 9-2 9-5
(England) Bodimeade	(Australia) Carlyon	7-9 9-5 9-3 1-9 9-7
(England) Marshall	(Singapore) Hill	9-7 9-5 9-3
(Scotland) Maclean	(England) Ransome	1-9 8-10 9-0 9-4 9-0
(Egypt) Taher	(England) Oxley	3-9 9-2 4-9 9-0 9-2

=== Main draw ===
Third round
1	(Pakistan) Jahangir Khan	9	9	9
(Sweden) Anders Wahlstedt	0	4	0
11	(Pakistan) Mir Zaman Gul	9	7	3	9	9
(England) Geoff Williams	5	9	9	3	1
7	(Pakistan) Umar Hayat Khan	6	9	9	1	9
(England) Paul Carter	9	4	6	9	5
14	(Scotland) Stuart Hailstone	4	7	4
(Finland) Sami Elopuro	9	9	9
4	(New Zealand) Ross Norman	9	9	3	9
(South Africa) Craig Van der Wath	0	2	9	2
15	(Australia) Rodney Eyles	9	9	9
(England) Jason Nicolle	4	0	1
8	(Australia) Brett Martin	9	9	10
(England) Paul Gregory	5	7	8
12	(Australia) Tristan Nancarrow	0	9	7	5
(England) Chris Walker	9	5	9	9
9	(England) Del Harris	9	9	9
(Australia) Martin Bodimeade	5	3	0
(Australia) Rodney Martin	9	9	9
(Australia) Ricki Hill	6	2	2
16	(England) Jamie Hickox	5	9	7	9	9
(Canada) Sabir Butt	9	2	9	4	7
3	(Australia) Chris Dittmar	9	9	9
(England) Peter Marshall	5	1	3
10	(England) Phil Kenyon	0	ret
(Scotland) Mark Maclean	9
6	(Australia) Chris Robertson	9	9	9
(England) Bryan Beeson	1	5	5
13	(Pakistan) Zarak Jahan Khan	9	7	9	9
(Egypt) Ahmed Taher	3	9	2	5
2	(Pakistan) Jansher Khan	9	9	9
(England) Hiddy Jahan	2	1	0

Fourth round
1	(Pakistan) Jahangir K	9	9	7	8	9
11	(Pakistan) Gul	1	0	9	10	2
7	(Pakistan) U H Khan	9	9	9
(Finland) Elopuro	2	2	6
4	(New Zealand) Norman	9	8	10	9
15	(Australia) Eyles	5	10	8	4
8	(Australia) B Martin	7	9	9
(England) Walker	6	1	4
5	(Australia) R Martin	9	10	4	7	9
9	(England) Harris	6	9	9	9	7
3	(Australia) Dittmar	9	9	9
16	(England) Hickox	3	4	0
6	(Australia) Robertson	9	9	9
(Scotland) Maclean	8	0	1
13	(Pakistan) Z J Khan	2	6	1
2	(Pakistan) Jansher K	9	9	9

Quarter-finals
1	(Pakistan) Jahangir K	9	9	9
7	(Pakistan) U H Khan	2	0	2
4	(New Zealand) Norman	9	10	9
8	(Australia) B Martin	7	9	6
5	(Australia) R Martin	10	9	2	9
3	(Australia) Dittmar	9	7	9	1
6	(Australia) Robertson	9	9	9
2	(Pakistan) Jansher K	4	6	0

Semi-finals
1	(Pakistan) Jahangir K	9	6	9	9
4	(New Zealand) Norman	0	9	3	4
Final
1	(Pakistan) Jahangir K	9	5	9	0	9
5	(Australia) R Martin	2	9	5	9	2
5	(Australia) R Martin	5	9	9	9	9
6	(Australia) Robertson	9	10	4	2	5

Preceded by 1988	British Open Squash Championships; England (London); 1989	Succeeded by 1990
