= 1991 Men's British Open Squash Championship =

British Open Squash Championships
- 53rd British Open Championships

Details
- Location: London, England
- Venue: Lambs Squash Club & Wembley Conference Centre
- Dates: 12–22 April 1991

The 1991 Hi-Tec British Open Championships was held at the Lambs Squash Club with the later stages being held at the Wembley Conference Centre from 12 to 22 April 1991.
Jahangir Khan won his tenth consecutive title defeating Jansher Khan in the final.
Jahangir was only seeded fourth because he had previously taken time off from competition through illness and exhaustion.
Jamie Hickcox and Austin Adarraga now represented Canada and Australia respectively.

== Seeds ==
1. (Pakistan) Jansher Khan
2. (Australia) Chris Robertson
3. (Australia) Chris Dittmar
4. (Pakistan) Jahangir Khan
5. (Australia) Rodney Martin
6. (Australia) Brett Martin
7. (Pakistan) Mir Zaman Gul
8. (Australia) Tristan Nancarrow
9. (Scotland) Mark Maclean
10. (Finland) Sami Elopuro
11. (New Zealand) Ross Norman
12. (England) Del Harris
13. (Wales) Adrian Davies
14. (England) Bryan Beeson
15. (Australia) Rodney Eyles
16. (Scotland) Stuart Hailstone

== Draw and results ==
=== First round ===
Player One	Player Two	Score
(Australia) Anthony Hill	(England) Mark Cairns	9-7 0-9 0-9 9-5 9-6
(England) Paul Gregory	(South Africa) Craig van der Wath	10-9 9-5 9-6
(England) Tony Hands	(England) Danny Meddings	9-4 9-4 9-4
(Spain) Austin Adarraga	(Finland) Marko Pulli	9-4 4-9 9-5 9-5
(England) David Campion	(England) Robert Owen	8-10 9-4 10-9 9-1
(Sweden) Fredrik Johnson	(England) Robert Graham	7-9 9-5 9-7 9-6
(England) Stephen Meads	(England) Phil Kenyon	9-3 9-4 9-3
(Pakistan) Zarak Jahan Khan	(England) Chris Walker	9-4 10-8 2-9 9-10 9-7
(England) Phil Whitlock	(Republic of Ireland) Derek Ryan	10-8 9-6 9-3
(Australia) Adam Schreiber	(Germany) Hansi Wiens	9-0 9-1 9-5
(Pakistan) Umar Hayat Khan	(England) Mark Carlyon	8-10 9-4 9-1 9-5
(England) Damian Walker	(Canada) Jamie Hickox	9-2 9-0 3-9 9-4
(England) Peter Marshall	(Pakistan) Ghous Ur Rehman	9-5 9-3 9-2
(Canada) Sabir Butt	(New Zealand) Glen Wilson	9-6 9-6 9-
(England) Paul Carter	(Australia) John Goodchild	10-8 7-9 9-7 9-6
(England) Simon Parke	(England) Jason Nicolle	9-3 9-5 9-5

=== Main draw ===
Second round
4	(Pakistan) Jahangir Khan
(England) Damian Walker
13	(Wales) Adrian Davies
(Australia) Anthony Hill
14	(England) Bryan Beeson
(England) Phil Whitlock
(Pakistan) Umar Hayat Khan	9	9	1	9
7	(Pakistan) Mir Zaman Gul	1	6	9	7
5	(Australia) Rodney Martin	0	9	9	9
(Canada) Sabir Butt	9	6	1	2
(England) Peter Marshall
9	(Scotland) Mark Maclean
(England) Simon Parke	9	9	9
2	(Australia) Chris Robertson	3	2	5
10	(Finland) Sami Elopuro	3	5	10	9	9
(England) Paul Carter	9	9	8	0	2
1	(Pakistan) Jansher Khan
(Spain) Austin Adarraga
11	(Australia) Ross Norman	9	9	2	9
(England) Paul Gregory	2	2	9	5
15	(Australia) Rodney Eyles
(Australia) Adam Schreiber
(England) Tony Hands
8	(Australia) Tristan Nancarrow
3	(Australia) Chris Dittmar	w/o
(England) David Campion	scr
16	(Scotland) Stuart Hailstone	9	1	9	9
(Sweden) Fredrik Johnson	4	9	0	2
12	(England) Del Harris
(Pakistan) Zarak Jahan Khan
(England) Stephen Meads	10	9	0	5	9
6	(Australia) Brett Martin	8	3	9	9	5

Third round
4	(Pakistan) Jahangir K	9	10	9
13	(Wales) Davies	3	9	0
14	(England) Beeson	7	9	9	9
(Pakistan) U H Khan	9	6	4	4
5	(Australia) Martin R	9	9	1	9
(England) Marshall	6	6	9	4
(England) Parke	9	9	9
10	(Finland) Elopuro	4	1	1
1	(Pakistan) Jansher K	9	9	9
11	(New Zealand) Norman	2	0	2
15	(Australia) Eyles	4	9	9	9
(England) Hands	9	1	7	7
3	(Australia) Dittmar	9	1	9	9
16	(Scotland) Hailstone	2	9	5	3
12	(England) Harris	9	9	9
(England) Meads	0	4	3

Quarter-finals
4	(Pakistan) Jahangir K	9	9	9
14	(England) Beeson	3	0	0
5	(Australia) Martin R	9	9	9
(England) Parke	3	3	4
1	(Pakistan) Jansher K	9	9	6	9
15	(Australia) Eyles	3	3	9	4
3	(Australia) Dittmar	9	9	9
12	(England) Harris	1	3	3

Semi-finals
4	(Pakistan) Jahangir K	9	9	9
5	(Australia) Martin R	5	2	7
Final
4	(Pakistan) Jahangir K	2	9	9	9
1	(Pakistan) Jansher K	9	4	4	0
1	(Pakistan) Jansher K	9	9	9	9
3	(Australia) Dittmar	10	1	6	2

Preceded by 1990	British Open Squash Championships; England (London); 1991	Succeeded by 1992
