= 1999 European Squash Team Championships =

Squash tournament

- 28th
- Location: (Austria) Linz
- Date: 28 April – 1 May 1999
- Website europeansquash.com

Results
- Champions: Men England; Women England

The 1999 European Squash Team Championships was the 28th edition of European Squash Team Championships for squash players. The event was held in Linz, Austria, from 28 April to 1 May 1999. The tournament was organised by the European Squash Rackets Federation (ESRF).

The England men's team won their 24th title and the England women's team won their 22nd title.

== Men's tournament ==
=== Group stage ===
Pool A

Pos	Team	P	W	L	Pts
1	England	3	3	0	6
2	Wales	3	2	1	4
3	Germany	3	1	2	2
4	Sweden	3	0	3	0

Pool B

Pos	Team	P	W	L	Pts
1	Scotland	3	3	0	6
2	Finland	3	2	1	4
3	France	3	1	2	2
4	Switzerland	3	0	3	0

=== Semi finals ===
England
4
Semi-final 1

Finland
0

			1	2	3	4	5
1	(England) (Finland)	Paul Johnson; Juha Raumolin	9; 3	9; 4	9; 6
2	(England) (Finland)	Simon Parke; Olli Tuominen	9; 0	9; 6	9; 1
3	(England) (Finland)	Chris Walker; Timo Tuominen	9; 3	9; 1	9; 1
4	(England) (Finland)	Marcus Berrett; Olle Poutiainen	9; 7	9; 0	9; 0

Scotland
4
Semi-final 2

Wales
0

			1	2	3	4	5
1	(Scotland) (Wales)	John White; Matthew Benjamin	9; 0	9; 1	9; 3
2	(Scotland) (Wales)	Stuart Cowie; Greg Tippings	10; 9	1; 9	9; 0	9; 1
3	(Scotland) (Wales)	Peter Nicol; Alex Gough	9; 7	9; 5	9; 1
4	(Scotland) (Wales)	Martin Heath; David Evans	9; 3	9; 0

=== Third place ===
Wales
2 (8)
Third place

Finland
2 (6)

			1	2	3	4	5
1	(Wales) (Finland)	Alex Gough; Juha Raumolin	9; 2	9; 1	9; 1
2	(Wales) (Finland)	David Evans; Janne Kyttanen	9; 3	9; 7	9; 6
3	(Wales) (Finland)	Matthew Benjamin; Olli Tuominen	4; 9	9; 7	9; 4	0; 9	0; 9
4	(Wales) (Finland)	Gareth Davies; Timo Tuominen	1; 9	6; 9	4; 9

=== Final ===
England
3
Final

Scotland
1

			1	2	3	4	5
1	(England) (Scotland)	Paul Johnson; Peter Nicol	2; 9	10; 8	2; 9	2; 9
2	(England) (Scotland)	Simon Parke; Martin Heath	5; 9	9; 7	9; 1	9; 1
3	(England) (Scotland)	Chris Walker; John White	3; 9	0; 9	9; 7	9; 5	9; 7
4	(England) (Scotland)	Lee Beachill; Stuart Cowie	4; 9	9; 2	9; 2	9; 2

== Women's tournament ==
=== Group stage ===
Pool A

Pos	Team	P	W	L	Pts
1	England	3	3	0	6
2	Scotland	3	2	1	4
3	Belgium	3	1	2	2
4	Sweden	3	0	3	0

Pool B

Pos	Team	P	W	L	Pts
1	Netherlands	3	3	0	6
2	Germany	3	2	1	4
3	Spain	3	1	2	2
4	France	3	0	3	0

=== Semi-finals ===
England
3
Semi-final 1

Netherlands
0

			1	2	3	4	5
1	(England) (Netherlands)	Cassie Jackman; Vanessa Atkinson	9; 1	9; 6	9; 5
2	(England) (Netherlands)	Suzanne Horner; Daphne Jelgersma	9; 1	9; 1
3	(England) (Netherlands)	Tania Bailey; Babette Hoogendoorn	9; 3	9; 0	9; 3

Germany
2
Semi-final 2

Scotland
1

			1	2	3	4	5
1	(Germany) (Scotland)	Sabine Schöne; Pamela Nimmo	9; 3	9; 2	9; 2
2	(Germany) (Scotland)	Sabine Baum; Claire Waddell	9; 5	9; 6	9; 7
3	(Germany) (Scotland)	Sandy Suck; Senga Macfie	9; 6	4; 9	1; 9	5; 9

=== Third place ===
Netherlands
2
Third place

Scotland
1

			1	2	3	4	5
1	(Netherlands) (Scotland)	Vanessa Atkinson; Pamela Nimmo	9; 5	9; 0	9; 4
2	(Netherlands) (Scotland)	Nicole Beumer; Claire Waddell	9; 7	9; 5	9; 4
3	(Netherlands) (Scotland)	Daphne Jelgersma; Senga Macfie	7; 9	9; 1	3; 9	1; 9

=== Final ===
England
3
Final

Germany
0

			1	2	3	4	5
1	(England) (Germany)	Cassie Jackman; Sabine Schöne	9; 4	9; 0	6; 9	9; 2
2	(England) (Germany)	Suzanne Horner; Daniela Grzenia	9; 6	5; 9	9; 2	9; 3
3	(England) (Germany)	Stephanie Brind; Karin Berière	9; 3	9; 1	9; 7
