= 1986 European Squash Team Championships =

Squash tournament

- 14th
- Location: (France) Aix-en-Provence
- Date: 1 – 3 May 1986
- Website europeansquash.com

Results
- Champions: Men England; Women England

The 1986 European Squash Team Championships, was the 14th edition of European Squash Team Championships for squash players. The event was held in Aix-en-Provence, France, from 1 to 3 May 1986. The tournament was organised by the European Squash Rackets Federation (ESRF).

The England men's team won their 12th title and the England women's team won their 9th title.

== Men's tournament ==
=== First Round ===
Team 1	Team 2	Score
Austria	Luxembourg	
(Austria) Belgium	Portugal	
Greece	Andorra	
Italy	Monaco	

=== Second Round ===
Team 1	Team 2	Score
England	Austria	5-0
Sweden	Italy	5–0
(Republic of Ireland) Ireland	Denmark	5–0
France	Spain	
West Germany	Switzerland	
Netherlands	Greece	
Finland	Belgium	5–0
Scotland	Norway	

=== Quarter finals ===
Team 1	Team 2	Score
England	France	5-0
Finland	Scotland	3–2
West Germany	Netherlands	
Sweden	(Republic of Ireland) Ireland	5–0

=== Semi finals ===
England
5
Semi-final 1

West Germany
0

			1	2	3	4	5
1	(England) (West Germany)	Gawain Briars; Carol Martini	9; 1	9; 1	9; 1	9
2	(England) (West Germany)	Martin Bodimeade; Michael Ehlers	9; 5	4; 9	9; 1	9; 2
3	(England) (West Germany)	David Pearson; Ralf Schuldt	9; 1	10; 8	9; 3
4	(England) (West Germany)	Bryan Beeson; Marc Rummel	9; 2	9; 1	9; 2
5	(England) (West Germany)	Ashley Naylor; Franz Schwerer	9; 5	9; 5	9; 3

Sweden
5
Semi-final 2

Finland
0

			1	2	3	4	5
1	(Sweden) (Finland)	Jan-Ulf Söderberg; Matti Saarela	2; 9	9; 1	9; 0	9; 6
2	(Sweden) (Finland)	Fredrik Johnson; Sami Elopuro	7; 2	9; 1	9; 5	9
3	(Sweden) (Finland)	Anders Wahlstedt; Pentti Pekkanen	9; 2	9; 5	9; 1
4	(Sweden) (Finland)	Björn Almström; Marko Pulli	5; 9	9; 4	9; 0	9; 0
5	(Sweden) (Finland)	Jonas Görnerup; Kale Leskinen	9; 5	9; 6	9; 3

=== Third place ===
Finland
4
Third place

West Germany
1

			1	2	3	4	5
1	(Finland) (West Germany)	Pentti Pekkanen; Mark Rummel	8; 10	9; 5	9; 6	9; 4
2	(Finland) (West Germany)	Sami Elopuro; Ralf Schuld	9; 5	9; 3	9; 3
3	(Finland) (West Germany)	Marko Pulli; Franz Schwerer	3; 9	9; 4	2; 9 9	2
4	(Finland) (West Germany)	Matti Saarela; Carol Martini	9; 3	9; 0	9; 4
5	(Finland) (West Germany)	Markku Sainio; Michael Ehlers	7; 9	9; 3	9; 0	9; 1

=== Final ===
England
3
Final

Sweden
2

			1	2	3	4	5
1	(England) (Sweden)	Gawain Briars; Jan-Ulf Söderberg	0; 9	9; 6	6; 9	4; 9
2	(England) (Sweden)	Geoff Williams; Fredrik Johnson	10; 8	9; 1	9; 3
3	(England) (Sweden)	Martin Bodimeade; Anders Wahlstedt	10; 9	4; 9	9; 2	9; 5
4	(England) (Sweden)	David Pearson; Björn Almström	9; 7	8; 10	6; 9	6; 9
5	(England) (Sweden)	Bryan Beeson; Ulf Lagunoff	6; 9	2; 9	9; 2	9; 1	9; 4

== Women's tournament ==
=== First Round ===
Team 1	Team 2	Score
England	Luxembourg	3-0
Sweden	France	
(Republic of Ireland) Ireland	Monaco	3–0
Scotland	Austria	
Finland	Norway	3–0
Switzerland	Belgium	
West Germany	Denmark	
Netherlands	Spain	

=== Quarter finals ===
Team 1	Team 2	Score
England	Sweden	3-0
(Republic of Ireland) Ireland	Switzerland	3-0
Scotland	Netherlands	
Finland	West Germany	2–1

=== Semi-finals ===
Ireland
2
Semi-final 1

Scotland
1

			1	2	3	4	5
1	(Republic of Ireland) (Scotland)	Rebecca Best; Heather Wallace	4; 9	10; 9	9; 10	6; 9
2	(Republic of Ireland) (Scotland)	Marjorie Burke; Alison Cruikshank	9; 2	9; 1	9; 4
3	(Republic of Ireland) (Scotland)	Barbara Lowans; Shirley Brown	9; 7	9; 3	9; 2

England
3
Semi-final 2

Finland
0

			1	2	3	4	5
1	(England) (Finland)	Lucy Soutter; Tuula Myllniemi	9; 7	9; 4	9; 3
2	(England) (Finland)	Martine Le Moignan; Katja Sauerwald	9; 1	9; 1	9; 1
3	(England) (Finland)	Ruth Strauss; Nina Taimiaho	9; 2	9; 5	9; 0

=== Third place ===
Scotland
2
Third place

Finland
1

			1	2	3	4	5
1	(Scotland) (Finland)	Heather Wallace; Tuula Myllyniemi	8; 10	9; 1	9; 1	9; 1
2	(Scotland) (Finland)	Shirley Brown; Nina Nylund	9; 1	9; 2	9; 5
3	(Scotland) (Finland)	Alison Cruikshank; Katja Sauerwald	9; 2	4; 9	9; 2	9; 5

=== Final ===
England
3
Final

Ireland
0

			1	2	3	4	5
1	(England) (Republic of Ireland)	Lucy Soutter; Rebecca Best	9; 2	9; 1	9; 0
2	(England) (Republic of Ireland)	Martine Le Moignan; Marjorie Burke	9; 2	9; 1	9; 1
3	(England) (Republic of Ireland)	Alison Cumings; Barbara Lowans	9; 3	9; 6	9; 3
