= 1985 European Squash Team Championships =

Squash tournament

- 13th
- Location: (Spain) Barcelona
- Date: 6 – 7 April 1985
- Website europeansquash.com

Results
- Champions: Men England; Women England

The 1985 European Squash Team Championships sponsored by Guy Laroche, was the 13th edition of European Squash Team Championships for squash players. The event was held in Barcelona, Spain, from 6 to 7 April 1985. The tournament was organised by the European Squash Rackets Federation (ESRF).

The England men's team won their 11th title and the England women's team won their 8th title.

The Barcelona event had a sour note as many of the teams competing in the tournament were subject to street crime (robberies or assaults), which led to the President of the Scottish SRA stating "It is the most dangerous city that he had been in".

== Men's tournament ==
=== First Round ===
Team 1	Team 2	Score
England		–
Wales		–
Finland	Italy	5–0
West Germany		–
Scotland	Spain	4–1
(Republic of Ireland) Ireland		–
Netherlands		–
Sweden		–

=== Quarter finals ===
Team 1	Team 2	Score
England		
Netherlands		
Finland	Scotland	3–2
Sweden		

=== Semi finals ===
England
4
Semi-final 1

Netherlands
1

			1	2	3	4	5
1	(England) (Netherlands)	Geoff Williams
2	(England) (Netherlands)	Bryan Beeson
3	(England) (Netherlands)	David Pearson
4	(England) (Netherlands)	Ashley Naylor
5	(England) (Netherlands)	Martin Bodimeade

Sweden
5
Semi-final 2

Finland
0

			1	2	3	4	5
1	(Sweden) (Finland)	Fredrik Johnson; Pentti Pekkanen	9; 3	9; 6	9; 3
2	(Sweden) (Finland)	Anders Wahlstedt; Hannu Jaskari	9; 3	9; 0	9; 1
3	(Sweden) (Finland)	Ulf Lagunoff; Sami Elopuro	5; 9	9; 3	9; 2	9; 1
4	(Sweden) (Finland)	Jan-Ulf Söderberg; Markku Sainio	9; 1	9; 6	9; 1
5	(Sweden) (Finland)	Lars Kvant; Kale Leskinen	4; 9	9; 3	6; 9	9; 5	9; 0

=== Third place ===
Finland
4
Third place

Netherlands
1

			1	2	3	4	5
1	(Finland) (Netherlands)	Pentti Pekkanen; Hans Frieling	9; 5	9; 1	9; 5
2	(Finland) (Netherlands)	Sami Elopuro; Rick Zandvliet	4; 9	2; 9	4; 9
3	(Finland) (Netherlands)	Kale Leskinen; Raymond Scheffer	9; 5	9; 7	9; 7
4	(Finland) (Netherlands)	Matti Saarela; Eric van der Pluijm	9; 1	9; 5	9; 6
5	(Finland) (Netherlands)	Markku Sainio; Jan van Wijnen	9; 5	9; 1	9; 4

=== Final ===
England
4
Final

Sweden
1

			1	2	3	4	5
1	(England) (Sweden)	Geoff Williams; Fredrik Johnson
2	(England) (Sweden)	Bryan Beeson; Ulf Lagunoff
3	(England) (Sweden)	David Pearson; Jonas Görnerup
4	(England) (Sweden)	Ashley Naylor; Jan-Ulf Söderberg
5	(England) (Sweden)	Martin Bodimeade; Lars Kvant

== Women's tournament ==
=== First Round ===
Team 1	Team 2	Score
England	Italy	3–0
Netherlands		–
Finland	France	2–1
Wales	Spain	3–0
Scotland	Austria	3–0
(Republic of Ireland) Ireland	Monaco	3–0
Switzerland		-
West Germany		-

=== Quarter finals ===
Team 1	Team 2	Score
England	West Germany	3-0
Wales		-
(Republic of Ireland) Ireland		-
Scotland	Finland	3-0

=== Semi-finals ===
Ireland
2
Semi-final 1

Scotland
1

			1	2	3	4	5
1	(Republic of Ireland) (Scotland)	Mary Byrne; Heather Wallace
2	(Republic of Ireland) (Scotland)	Barbara Lowans; Shirley Brown
3	(Republic of Ireland) (Scotland)	Marjorie Burke; Audrey Cumberford or Alison Cruickshank

England
3
Semi-final 2

Wales
0

			1	2	3	4	5
1	(England) (Wales)	Alison Cumings
2	(England) (Wales)	Nicky Spurgeon
3	(England) (Wales)	Alexandra Cowie

=== Third place ===
Scotland
2
Third place

Wales
1

			1	2	3	4	5
1	(Scotland) (Wales)	Heather Wallace
2	(Scotland) (Wales)	Shirley Brown; Deana Murray
3	(Scotland) (Wales)

=== Final ===
England
3
Final

Ireland
0

			1	2	3	4	5
1	(England) (Republic of Ireland)	Alison Cumings; Mary Byrne
2	(England) (Republic of Ireland)	Nicky Spurgeon; Barbara Lowans
3	(England) (Republic of Ireland)	Alexandra Cowie; Marjorie Burke
