= Scotland national squash team =

Scotland national squash team may refer to:

- Scotland men's national squash team
- Scotland women's national squash team
