= 1992 European Squash Team Championships =

Squash tournament

- 20th
- Location: (France) Aix-en-Provence
- Venue: Set Squash Centre
- Date: 29 April – 2 May 1992
- Website europeansquash.com

Results
- Champions: Men Scotland; Women England

The 1992 European Squash Team Championships was the 20th edition of European Squash Team Championships for squash players. The event was held at the Set Squash Centre in Aix-en-Provence, France, from 29 April to 2 May 1992. The tournament was organised by the European Squash Rackets Federation (ESRF).

The Scotland men's team won their first title and the England women's team won their 15th title.

== Men's tournament ==
=== Group stage ===
Pool A

Pos	Team	P	W	L	Pts
1	England	3	3	0	6
2	Sweden	3	2	1	4
3	Netherlands	3	1	2	2
4	Spain	3	0	3	0

Pool B

Pos	Team	P	W	L	Pts
1	Finland	3	3	0	6
2	Scotland	3	2	1	4
3	Germany	3	1	2	2
4	Wales	3	0	3	0

=== Semi finals ===
Scotland
3
Semi-final 1

England
2

			1	2	3	4	5
1	(Scotland) (England)	Mark Maclean; Peter Marshall	9; 2	4; 9	10; 9	2; 9	9; 6
2	(Scotland) (England)	Colin Keith; Del Harris	4; 9	9; 4	10; 8	0; 9	10; 9
3	(Scotland) (England)	Peter Nicol; Jason Nicolle	4; 9	9; 6	0; 9	9; 4	10; 7
4	(Scotland) (England)	Derek Ritchie; Simon Parke	1; 9	1; 9	5; 9
5	(Scotland) (England)	Martin Heath; Paul Gregory	2; 9	3; 9	10; 8	1; 9

Finland
5
Semi-final 2

Sweden
0

			1	2	3	4	5
1	(Finland) (Sweden)	Sami Elopuro; Fredrik Johnson	9; 5	9; 5
2	(Finland) (Sweden)	Pentti Pekkanen; Anders Wahlstedt	9; 2	9; 4	9; 4
3	(Finland) (Sweden)	Marko Pulli; Jonas Görnerup	9; 3	9; 7
4	(Finland) (Sweden)	Ville Mäkisarka; Jimmy Thun	9; 6	9; 5	9; 0
5	(Finland) (Sweden)	Juha Raumolin; Daniel Forslund	9; 3	7; 9	9; 7	9; 3

=== Third place ===
England
5
Third place

Sweden
0

			1	2	3	4	5
1	(England) (Sweden)	Peter Marshall; Fredrik Johnson	9; 1	9; 1	9; 6
2	(England) (Sweden)	Chris Walker; Anders Wahlstedt	5; 9	9; 1	9; 3	9; 4
3	(England) (Sweden)	Jason Nicolle; Jimmy Thun	w/o scr
4	(England) (Sweden)	Simon Parke; Anders Thoren	9; 0	9; 1	9; 0
5	(England) (Sweden)	Paul Gregory; Daniel Forslund	9; 0	9; 6	8; 10	7; 9	9; 3

=== Final ===
Scotland
3
Final

Finland
2

			1	2	3	4	5
1	(Scotland) (Finland)	Mark Maclean; Sami Elopuro	0; 9	1; 9	9; 4	3; 9
2	(Scotland) (Finland)	Colin Keith; Pentti Pekkanen	9; 4	9; 4	9; 2
3	(Scotland) (Finland)	Peter Nicol; Marko Pulli	9; 3	9; 3	9; 6
4	(Scotland) (Finland)	Derek Ritchie; Ville Mäkisarka	6; 9	9; 1	9; 2	9; 6
5	(Scotland) (Finland)	Martin Heath; Juha Raumolin	7; 9	6; 9	3; 9

== Women's tournament ==
=== Group stage ===
Pool A

Pos	Team	P	W	L	Pts
1	England	3	3	0	6
2	(Republic of Ireland) Ireland	3	2	1	4
3	Finland	3	1	2	2
4	Denmark	3	0	3	0

Pool B

Pos	Team	P	W	L	Pts
1	Germany	3	3	0	6
2	Netherlands	3	2	1	4
3	Scotland	3	1	2	2
4	France	3	0	3	0

=== Semi-finals ===
England
3
Semi-final 1

Netherlands
0

			1	2	3	4	5
1	(England) (Netherlands)	Martine Le Moignan; Nicole Beumer	9; 3	9; 4	9; 5
2	(England) (Netherlands)	Cassie Jackman; Hugoline van Hoorn	9; 7	9; 3	9; 1
3	(England) (Netherlands)	Sue Wright; Marjolein Houtsma	9; 3	9; 2	4; 9	9; 6

Germany
2
Semi-final 2

Ireland
1

			1	2	3	4	5
1	(Germany) (Republic of Ireland)	Sabine Schöne; Rebecca Best	6; 9	9; 10	9; 5	3; 9
2	(Germany) (Republic of Ireland)	Daniela Grzenia; Brona Conway	9; 4	10; 8	9; 6
3	(Germany) (Republic of Ireland)	Sabine Baum; Jill MacCaughey	9; 6	10; 8	9; 1

=== Third place ===
Netherlands
2
Third place

Ireland
1

			1	2	3	4	5
1	(Netherlands) (Republic of Ireland)	Nicole Beumer; Rebecca Best	9; 2	9; 6	7; 9	1; 9	4; 9
2	(Netherlands) (Republic of Ireland)	Hugoline van Hoorn; Brona Conway	9; 2	9; 7	9; 2
3	(Netherlands) (Republic of Ireland)	Marjolein Houtsma; Jill MacCaughey	9; 5	9; 0	9; 4			]

=== Final ===
England
3
Final

Germany
0

			1	2	3	4	5
1	(England) (Germany)	Martine Le Moignan; Sabine Schöne	9; 1	9; 1	9; 6
2	(England) (Germany)	Cassie Jackman; Daniela Grzenia	3; 9	9; 6	9; 4	9; 1
3	(England) (Germany)	Sue Wright; Sabine Baum	9; 2	2; 9	8; 10	9; 7	9; 4
