= 1984 European Squash Team Championships =

Squash tournament

- 12th
- Location: (Republic of Ireland) Dublin
- Venue: Columbus Squash & Health Club
- Date: 21 – 23 April 1984
- Website europeansquash.com

Results
- Champions: Men England; Women England

The 1984 European Squash Team Championships, Sponsored by ASB, was the 12th edition of European Squash Team Championships for squash players. The event was held at the Columbus Squash & Health Club in Dublin, Ireland, from 21 to 23 April 1984. The tournament was organised by the European Squash Rackets Federation (ESRF).

The England men's team won their 10th title and the England women's team won their 7th title.

== Men's tournament ==
=== First Round ===
Team 1	Team 2	Score
Norway	Luxembourg	4-1
Denmark	Austria	3-2
Italy	Monaco	4-1

=== Second Round ===
Team 1	Team 2	Score
England	Norway	5-0
Germany	France	4-1
Finland	Belgium	5-0
Wales	Denmark	3-2
Scotland	Switzerland	5-0
(Republic of Ireland) Ireland	Greece	5-0
Netherlands	Spain	5-0
Sweden	Italy	4-1

=== Quarter finals ===
Team 1	Team 2	Score
England	Scotland	5-0
(Republic of Ireland) Ireland	Wales	5-0
Finland	Netherlands	3-2
Sweden	Germany	5-0

=== Semi finals ===
England
5
Semi-final 1

Ireland
0

			1	2	3	4	5
1	(England) (Republic of Ireland)	Neil Harvey; Willy Hosey	9; 4	2; 9	9; 6	9; 6
2	(England) (Republic of Ireland)	Ashley Naylor; John Barrett	9; 0	9; 6	10; 8
3	(England) (Republic of Ireland)	Martin Bodimeade; David Gotto	9; 1	9; 3	9; 2
4	(England) (Republic of Ireland)	Christy Willstrop; Richie Power	9; 2	9; 2	9; 2
5	(England) (Republic of Ireland)	David Pearson; John McKay	9; 6	9; 5	9; 1

Sweden
4
Semi-final 2

Finland
1

			1	2	3	4	5
1	(Sweden) (Finland)	Lars Kvant; Markku Sainio	9; 2	6; 9	3; 9	5; 9
2	(Sweden) (Finland)	Jan-Ulf Söderberg; Kale Leskinen	7; 9	9; 6	9; 2	9; 7
3	(Sweden) (Finland)	Ulf Lagunoff; Matti Saarela	9; 5	9; 0	9; 5
4	(Sweden) (Finland)	Claes Eriksson; Jarmo Lajunen	9; 8	9; 0	10; 5
5	(Sweden) (Finland)	Jonas Görnerup; Ari Simola	9; 5	9; 6	9; 3

=== Third place ===
Finland
4
Third place

Ireland
1

			1	2	3	4	5
1	(Finland) (Republic of Ireland)	Pentti Pekkanen; Richie Power	9; 6	9; 3	9; 6
2	(Finland) (Republic of Ireland)	Jarmo Lajunen; John McKay	0; 9	3; 9	9; 4	9; 7	1; 9
3	(Finland) (Republic of Ireland)	Kale Leskinen; John Barret	9; 6	9; 7	9; 7
4	(Finland) (Republic of Ireland)	Matti Saarela; David Gotto	9; 2	9; 3	9; 2
5	(Finland) (Republic of Ireland)	Markku Sainio; Willie Hosey	9; 10	10; 9	9; 1	5; 9	9; 2

=== Final ===
England
5
Final

Sweden
0

			1	2	3	4	5
1	(England) (Sweden)	Geoff Williams; Lars Kvant	9; 7	9; 5	9; 0
2	(England) (Sweden)	Neil Harvey; Jan-Ulf Söderberg	9; 5	9; 4	9; 6
3	(England) (Sweden)	Ashley Naylor; Fredrik Johnson	9; 0	9; 5	9; 5
4	(England) (Sweden)	Christy Willstrop; Ulf Lagunoff	9; 2	6; 9	10; 9	9; 7
5	(England) (Sweden)	David Pearson; Claes Eriksson	9; 2	3; 9	2; 9	9; 1	9; 3

== Women's tournament ==
=== First Round ===
Team 1	Team 2	Score
England	Denmark	3-0
Germany	Norway	3-0
Finland	Spain	3-0
Wales	Austria	3-0
Scotland	Monaco	3-0
(Republic of Ireland) Ireland	Italy	3-0
Netherlands	France	3-0
Switzerland	Belgium	3-0

=== Quarter finals ===
Team 1	Team 2	Score
England	Switzerland	3-0
Wales	Finland	3-0
(Republic of Ireland) Ireland	Netherlands	3-0
Scotland	Germany	3-0

=== Semi-finals ===
Ireland
2
Semi-final 1

Wales
1

			1	2	3	4	5
1	(Republic of Ireland) (Wales)	Mary Byrne; Debbie Turnbull	4; 9	10; 9	9; 10	6; 9
2	(Republic of Ireland) (Wales)	Marjorie Burke; Sian Washer	9; 2	9; 1	9; 4
3	(Republic of Ireland) (Wales)	Rebecca Best; Christina Rees Davies	9; 7	9; 3	9; 2

England
3
Semi-final 2

Scotland
0

			1	2	3	4	5
1	(England) (Scotland)	Angela Smith; Heather Wallace	9; 3	9; 1	9; 2
2	(England) (Scotland)	Alison Cumings; Shirley Brown	9; 4	9; 6	9; 6
3	(England) (Scotland)	Nicky Spurgeon; Joyce Leach	9; 2	9; 4	9; 6

=== Third place ===
Scotland
2
Third place

Wales
1

			1	2	3	4	5
1	(Scotland) (Wales)	Alison Cruickshank
2	(Scotland) (Wales)	Shirley Brown
3	(Scotland) (Wales)	Joyce Leach

=== Final ===
England
2
Final

Ireland
1

			1	2	3	4	5
1	(England) (Republic of Ireland)	Angela Smith; Mary Byrne	9; 7	9; 6	9; 1
2	(England) (Republic of Ireland)	Alison Cumings; Marjorie Burke	9; 7	7; 9	0; 9	9; 6	2; 9
3	(England) (Republic of Ireland)	Nicky Spurgeon; Rebecca Best	9; 1	9; 2	9; 5
