= Marcus Berrett =

English squash player (born 1975)

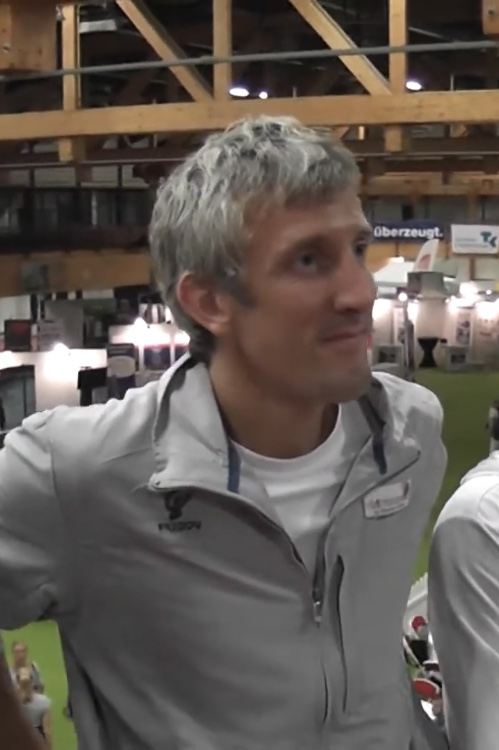

Personal information
- Born: 23 September 1975 (age 50) Halifax, England

Sport
- Country: England
- Handedness: Right Handed
- Coached by: Malcom Willstrop Duncan Steele
- Retired: 2005
- Racquet used: Dunlop

Men's singles
- Highest ranking: No. 37 (January 1999)
- Title: 4
- Tour final: 9
Medal record
Men's squash
Representing England
European Team Championships
Gold medal – first place	1998 Helsinki	Team
Gold medal – first place	1999 Linz	Team

Marcus Ashley Berrett (born 23 September 1975) is an English former professional squash player who also represented Italy internationally. He reached a career-high world ranking of 37 in January 1999.

== Biography ==
Berrett was born in Halifax, England and won two gold medals for the England men's national squash team at the European Squash Team Championships in 1998 and 1999.
