= Vähämaa =

Vähämaa is a Finnish surname. Notable people with the surname include:

- Jaakko Vähämaa (born 1993), Finnish squash player
- Jenni Vähämaa (born 1992), Finnish figure skater
