= 1998 European Squash Team Championships =

Squash tournament

- 27th
- Location: (Finland) Espoo, Helsinki
- Date: 23 – 26 April 1998
- Website europeansquash.com

Results
- Champions: Men England; Women England

The 1998 European Squash Team Championships was the 27th edition of European Squash Team Championships for squash players. The event was held in Espoo, near Helsinki, Finland, from 23 to 26 April 1998. The tournament was organised by the European Squash Rackets Federation (ESRF).

The England men's team won their 23rd title and the England women's team won their 21st title.

== Men's tournament ==
=== Group stage ===
Pool A

Pos	Team	P	W	L	Pts
1	England	3	3	0	6
2	France	3	2	1	4
3	Sweden	3	1	2	2
4	Denmark	3	0	3	0

Pool B

Pos	Team	P	W	L	Pts
1	Finland	3	3	0	6
2	Wales	3	2	1	4
3	Germany	3	1	2	2
4	Switzerland	3	0	3	0

=== Semi finals ===
England
3
Semi-final 1

Wales
1

			1	2	3	4	5
1	(England) (Wales)	Simon Parke; Alex Gough	0; 9	9; 1	4; 9	9; 1	9; 2
2	(England) (Wales)	Del Harris; David Evans	3; 9	7; 9	6; 9
3	(England) (Wales)	Paul Johnson; Greg Tippings	9; 1	9; 10	9; 0	9; 6
4	(England) (Wales)	Mark Chaloner; Gareth Davies	9; 1	9; 0	9; 2

Finland
3
Semi-final 2

France
1

			1	2	3	4	5
1	(Finland) (France)	Juha Raumolin; Thierry Lincou	9; 4	9; 5	9; 5
2	(Finland) (France)	Janne Kyttänen; Renan Lavigne	9; 2	10; 8	9; 6
3	(Finland) (France)	Timo Tuominen; Jean Michel Arcucci	7; 9	6; 9	9; 7	9; 4	9; 10
4	(Finland) (France)	Mika Monto; Christophe Montagnier	6; 9	9; 4	9; 0	9; 2

=== Third place ===
Wales
2 (9)
Third place

France
2 (8)

			1	2	3	4	5
1	(Wales) (France)	Alex Gough; Thierry Lincou	7; 9	5; 9	3; 9
2	(Wales) (France)	David Evans; Renan Lavigne	9; 3	9; 2	9; 2
3	(Wales) (France)	Greg Tippings; Christophe Montagnier	9; 6	9; 3	1; 9	3; 9	3; 9
4	(Wales) (France)	Gareth Davies; Laurent Elriani	9; 3	9; 5	8; 10	2; 9	9; 4

=== Final ===
England
3
Final

Finland
1

			1	2	3	4	5
1	(England) (Finland)	Simon Parke; Juha Raumolin	9; 5	9; 6	5; 9	4; 9	7; 9
2	(England) (Finland)	Del Harris; Janne Kyttänen	9; 2	9; 0	9; 2
3	(England) (Finland)	Chris Walker; Olle Poutiainen	9; 2	9; 5	9; 2
4	(England) (Finland)	Mark Chaloner; Mika Monto	9; 5	9; 2	9; 2

== Women's tournament ==
=== Group stage ===
Pool A

Pos	Team	P	W	L	Pts
1	England	3	3	0	6
2	Scotland	3	2	1	4
3	France	3	1	2	2
4	Sweden	3	0	3	0

Pool B

Pos	Team	P	W	L	Pts
1	Germany	3	3	0	6
2	Netherlands	3	2	1	4
3	Belgium	3	1	2	2
4	Finland	3	0	3	0

=== Semi-finals ===
England
3
Semi-final 1

Netherlands
0

			1	2	3	4	5
1	(England) (Netherlands)	Sue Wright; Vanessa Atkinson	9; 6	9; 2	9; 10	9; 0
2	(England) (Netherlands)	Cassie Jackman; Hugoline Van Hoorn	9; 2	9; 0	9; 0
3	(England) (Netherlands)	Linda Charman; Marjolein Houtsma	9; 2	9; 2	9; 5

Germany
2
Semi-final 2

Scotland
1

			1	2	3	4	5
1	(Germany) (Scotland)	Sabine Schöne; Claire Waddell	9; 7	9; 0	9; 3
2	(Germany) (Scotland)	Sabine Baum; Senga Macfie	2; 9	4; 9	2; 9
3	(Germany) (Scotland)	Daniela Grzenia; Pamela Nimmo	2; 9	9; 4	9; 4	9; 7

=== Third place ===
Netherlands
3
Third place

Scotland
0

			1	2	3	4	5
1	(Netherlands) (Scotland)	Vanessa Atkinson; Claire Waddell	7; 9	9; 7	9; 7	9; 1
2	(Netherlands) (Scotland)	Hugoline Van Hoorn; Senga Macfie	5; 9	3; 9	9; 5	9; 6	9; 8
3	(Netherlands) (Scotland)	Nicole Beumer; Laura Hamilton	9; 4	9; 3	9; 2

=== Final ===
England
3
Final

Germany
0

			1	2	3	4	5
1	(England) (Germany)	Sue Wright; Sabine Schöne	4; 9	9; 4	5; 9	9; 0	9; 3
2	(England) (Germany)	Cassie Jackman; Sabine Baum	9; 5	9; 4	9; 2
3	(England) (Germany)	Linda Charman; Daniela Grzenia	9; 4	9; 2	9; 2
