= 1989 European Squash Team Championships =

Squash tournament

- 17th
- Location: (Finland) Helsinki
- Date: 26 – 29 April 1989
- Website europeansquash.com

Results
- Champions: Men England; Women England

The 1989 European Squash Team Championships, sponsored by ICI Perspex, was the 17th edition of European Squash Team Championships for squash players. The event was held in Helsinki, Finland, from 26 to 29 April 1989. The tournament was organised by the European Squash Rackets Federation (ESRF).

The England men's team won their 15th title and the England women's team won their 12th title.

== Men's tournament ==
=== Group stage ===
Pool A

Pos	Team	P	W	L	Pts
1	England	3	3	0	6
2	West Germany	3	2	1	4
3	Netherlands	3	1	2	2
4	Spain	3	0	3	0

Pool B

Pos	Team	P	W	L	Pts
1	Sweden	3	3	0	6
2	Finland	3	2	1	4
3	France	3	1	2	2
4	(Republic of Ireland) Ireland	3	0	3	0

=== Semi finals ===
England
5
Semi-final 1

Finland
0

			1	2	3	4	5
1	(England) (Finland)	Del Harris; Pentti Pekkanen	8; 10	9; 5	9; 3	9; 5
2	(England) (Finland)	Chris Walker; Marko Pulli	9; 0	7; 9	9; 3	10; 8
3	(England) (Finland)	Bryan Beeson; Matti Saarela	9; 1	10; 8	9; 3
4	(England) (Finland)	Neil Harvey; Hannu Jaskari	10; 8	9; 7	10; 8
5	(England) (Finland)	Paul Gregory; Henry Kampman	9; 1	9; 4	9; 4

Sweden
3
Semi-final 2

West Germany
2

			1	2	3	4	5
1	(Sweden) (West Germany)	Anders Wahlstedt
2	(Sweden) (West Germany)	Fredrik Johnson
3	(Sweden) (West Germany)	Jonas Görnerup
4	(Sweden) (West Germany)	Björn Almström
5	(Sweden) (West Germany)	Ulf Lagunoff

=== Third place ===
Finland
4
Third place

West Germany
1

			1	2	3	4	5
1	(Finland) (West Germany)	Sami Elopuro; Carol Martini	9; 1	9; 3	9; 4
2	(Finland) (West Germany)	Pentti Pekkanen; Hansi Wiens	1; 9	9; 7	9; 1	9; 10	1; 9
3	(Finland) (West Germany)	Petri Levomäki; Oliver Rucks	9; 6	9; 6	9; 2
4	(Finland) (West Germany)	Hannu Jaskari; Marc Rummel	9; 6	9; 6	9; 5
5	(Finland) (West Germany)	Marko Pulli; Jochen Arndt	9; 2	5; 9	4; 9	9; 7	9; 7

=== Final ===
England
4
Final

Sweden
1

			1	2	3	4	5
1	(England) (Sweden)	Del Harris; Anders Wahlstedt	9; 0	9; 0	9; 4
2	(England) (Sweden)	Chris Walker; Fredrik Johnson	9; 4	9; 4	9; 4
3	(England) (Sweden)	Paul Carter; Jonas Görnerup	9; 10	9; 3	2; 9	2; 9
4	(England) (Sweden)	Bryan Beeson; Björn Almström	9; 1	9; 3	9; 7
5	(England) (Sweden)	Paul Gregory; Ulf Lagunoff	0; 9	9; 6	9; 8	9; 1

== Women's tournament ==
=== Group stage ===
Pool A

Pos	Team	P	W	L	Pts
1	England	3	3	0	6
2	Netherlands	3	2	1	4
3	Finland	3	1	2	2
4	Denmark	3	0	3	0

Pool B

Pos	Team	P	W	L	Pts
1	(Republic of Ireland) Ireland	3	3	0	6
2	Sweden	3	2	1	4
3	West Germany	3	1	2	2
4	France	3	0	3	0

=== Semi-finals ===
Ireland
2
Semi-final 1

Netherlands
1

			1	2	3	4	5
1	(Republic of Ireland) (Netherlands)	Rebecca Best; Nicole Beumer	7; 9	9; 5	9; 3	3; 9	9; 0
2	(Republic of Ireland) (Netherlands)	Caroline Collins; Marjolein Houtsma	9; 6	9; 5	4; 9	7; 9	9; 0
3	(Republic of Ireland) (Netherlands)	Brona Conway; Hugoline Van Hoorn	0; 9	8; 10	2; 9

England
3
Semi-final 2

Sweden
0

			1	2	3	4	5
1	(England) (Sweden)	Martine Le Moignan; Tinna Backlund	9; 2	9; 2	9; 3
2	(England) (Sweden)	Alison Cumings; Susanne Nyberg	9; 2	9; 1	9; 4
3	(England) (Sweden)	Lucy Soutter; Lena Olsson	9; 1	9; 0	9; 0

=== Third place ===
Netherlands
3
Third place

Sweden
0

			1	2	3	4	5
1	(Netherlands) (Sweden)	Nicole Beumer; Tinna Backlund	10; 8	7; 9	9; 5	6; 9	9; 2
2	(Netherlands) (Sweden)	Marjolein Houtsma; Eva Svenby	9; 6	9; 3	9; 6
3	(Netherlands) (Sweden)	Hugoline Van Hoorn; Susanne Nyberg	9; 1	9; 2	9; 6

=== Final ===
England
3
Final

Ireland
0

			1	2	3	4	5
1	(England) (Republic of Ireland)	Martine Le Moignan; Rebecca Best	9; 1	9; 6	2; 9	9; 5
2	(England) (Republic of Ireland)	Alison Cumings; Caroline Collins	9; 0	9; 5	9; 1
3	(England) (Republic of Ireland)	Suzanne Horner; Brona Conway	9; 0	9; 0	9; 0
