= Alasdair Taylor =

Alasdair Taylor may refer to:

- Alasdair Grant Taylor (1936-2007), Scottish artist and sculptor
- Alasdair Taylor (squash player) (born 1965), Scottish squash player
