= Andrew Dwyer =

English squash player (born 1956)

Andy Dwyer
Personal information
- Born: 4 November 1956 (age 69) Leeds, England

Sport
- Country: England

Men's singles
Medal record
Men's squash
Representing Great Britain
World Team Championships
Gold medal – first place	1979 Brisbane	Team
Representing England
European Team Championships
Gold medal – first place	1979 Hamburg	Team
Silver medal – second place	1980 Helsinki	Team
Gold medal – first place	1981 Amsterdam	Team
Gold medal – first place	1982 Cardiff	Team

Andrew Phillip Dwyer (born 4 November 1956) is a former English professional squash player.

== Biography ==
Dwyer was born in Leeds on 4 November 1956 but lived in Hove, Sussex. He started playing at Withdean and was capped by England in 1977.

His greatest achievement was being part of the winning Great Britain team with Jonathan Leslie, Peter Verow and Phil Kenyon, during the 1979 World Team Squash Championships, in Brisbane, Australia, the last world amateur championship before the game went open.

Dwyer won three gold medals for the England men's national squash team at the European Squash Team Championships from 1979 to 1982.
