= Finnish Squash Association =

Sports governing body in Finland

Suomen Squashliitto
- Sport: Squash
- Abbreviation: SSqL
- Founded: 1971
- Regional affiliation: European Squash Federation
- Location: Helsinki
- President: Leo Hatjasalo
- CEO: Hannu Mäkinen

Official website
- www.squash.fi
- (Finland)

Finnish Squash Association ("Suomen Squashliitto" in Finnish) is the National Organisation for Squash in Finland.

== See also ==
- Finland men's national squash team
