= Mark Chaloner =

English squash player (born 1972)

Personal information
- Nationality: British (English)
- Born: 23 May 1972 (age 54) Nocton, Lincolnshire, England

Sport

Men's singles
- Highest ranking: No. 7 (September 2001)
Medal record
Men's squash
Representing England
Commonwealth Games
Gold medal – first place	1998 Kuala Lumpur	Doubles
Bronze medal – third place	2002 Manchester	Doubles
European Team Championships
Gold medal – first place	1996 Amsterdam	Team
Gold medal – first place	1998 Helsinki	Team
Gold medal – first place	2000 Vienna	Team
Gold medal – first place	2001 Eindhoven	Team
Gold medal – first place	2002 Böblingen	Team
Gold medal – first place	2003 Nottingham	Team

Mark Anthony Chaloner (born 23 May 1972) is a male retired professional squash player from England. He reached a career-high world ranking of World No. 7 in 2001 and won a gold medal at the Commonwealth Games.

== Biography ==
Chaloner was a member of the England team which won the World Team Squash Championships in 1995 and won a gold medal for England in the men's doubles at the 1998 Commonwealth Games in Kuala Lumpur, (partnering Paul Johnson).

Chaloner won six gold medals for the England men's national squash team at the European Squash Team Championships from 1996 to 2003.

Chaloner won another medal at the Commonwealth Games, after winning a bronze in the men's doubles with Paul Johnson for the 2002 England team at the 2002 Commonwealth Games in Manchester.

He was elected President of the Professional Squash Association (PSA) in 2002.
