= Daulat Khan (squash player) =

Pakistani squash player (born 1957)

Personal information
- Nationality: Pakistani
- Born: 19 May 1957
- Died: Peshawar, Pakistan

Sport
- Highest ranking: 27 (September 1982)
Medal record
Men's squash
Representing Pakistan
World Team Championships
| Gold medal – first place | 1977 Toronto | Team |
| Silver medal – second place | 1979 Brisbane | Team |

Daulat Khan (born 19 May 1957) is a former Pakistani professional squash player and world team champion. He reached a career high ranking of 27 in the world during September 1982.

== Biography ==
Daulat Khan was born in Peshawar and began playing squash in 1968, aged 11.

In 1976 he was the junior national champion of Pakistan and in 1978 was the national champion of Pakistan. He represented Pakistan in the 1977 and 1979 World Team Squash Championships, where he won gold and silver medals, respectively.
