= 1990 European Squash Team Championships =

Squash tournament

- 18th
- Location: (Switzerland) Zurich
- Date: 3 – 6 May 1990
- Website europeansquash.com

Results
- Champions: Men England; Women England

The 1990 European Squash Team Championships was the 18th edition of European Squash Team Championships for squash players. The event was held in Zurich, Switzerland, from 3 to 6 May 1990. The tournament was organised by the European Squash Rackets Federation (ESRF).

The England men's team won their 16th title and the England women's team won their 13th title.

== Men's tournament ==
=== Group stage ===
Pool A

Pos	Team	P	W	L	Pts
1	England	3	3	0	6
2	West Germany	3	2	1	4
3	Netherlands	3	1	2	2
4	Austria	3	0	3	0

Pool B

Pos	Team	P	W	L	Pts
1	Sweden	3	3	0	6
2	Finland	3	2	1	4
3	Switzerland	3	1	2	2
4	Spain	3	0	3	0

=== Semi finals ===
England
5
Semi-final 1

Finland
0

			1	2	3	4	5
1	(England) (Finland)	Del Harris; Pentti Pekkanen	9; 4	7; 9	9; 3	9; 3
2	(England) (Finland)	Simon Parke; Simo Tarvonen	9; 3	9; 4	9; 2
3	(England) (Finland)	Bryan Beeson; Marko Pulli	9; 6	10; 9	9; 3
4	(England) (Finland)	Chris Walker; Petri Levomäki	9; 0	9; 5	9; 0
5	(England) (Finland)	Peter Marshall; Hannu Jaskari	9; 6	9; 0	9; 3

West Germany
0
Semi-final 2

Sweden
0

			1	2	3	4	5
1	(West Germany) (Sweden)	Johann Wiens; Pieter Sjösten
2	(West Germany) (Sweden)	Jochen Arndt; Anders Wahlstedt
3	(West Germany) (Sweden)	Oliver Rucks; Jonas Görnerup
4	(West Germany) (Sweden)	Simon Frenz; Björn Almström
5	(West Germany) (Sweden)	Christian Bernard; Ulf Lagunoff

=== Third place ===
Finland
5
Third place

Sweden
0

			1	2	3	4	5
1	(Finland) (Sweden)	Pentti Pekkanen; Anders Wahlstedt	9; 7	9; 0	9; 4
2	(Finland) (Sweden)	Sami Elopuro; Fredrik Johnson	9; 3	9; 3	9; 3
3	(Finland) (Sweden)	Petri Levomäki; Pieter Sjösten	9; 7	9; 10	9; 6	9; 1
4	(Finland) (Sweden)	Hannu Jaskari; Björn Almström	9; 2	9; 1	7; 9	9; 5
5	(Finland) (Sweden)	Marko Pulli; Jonas Görnerup	9; 0	9; 0	9; 0

=== Final ===
England
5
Final

West Germany
0

			1	2	3	4	5
1	(England) (West Germany)	Del Harris; Johann Wiens
2	(England) (West Germany)	Simon Parke; Jochen Arndt
3	(England) (West Germany)	Bryan Beeson; Oliver Rucks
4	(England) (West Germany)	Chris Walker; Simon Frenz
5	(England) (West Germany)	Peter Marshall; Benjamin Bay

== Women's tournament ==
=== Group stage ===
Pool A

Pos	Team	P	W	L	Pts
1	England	3	3	0	6
2	Finland	3	2	1	4
3	Sweden	3	1	2	2
4	Norway	3	0	3	0

Pool B

Pos	Team	P	W	L	Pts
1	Netherlands	3	2	1	4
2	(Republic of Ireland) Ireland	3	2	1	4
3	West Germany	3	2	1	4
4	Switzerland	3	0	3	0

=== Semi-finals ===
Netherlands
3
Semi-final 1

Finland
0

			1	2	3	4	5
1	(Netherlands) (Finland)	Babete Hoogendoorn; Tuula Myllyniemi	3; 9	9; 7	10; 8	9; 4
2	(Netherlands) (Finland)	Marjolein Houtsma; Minna Sinervo	7; 9	9; 2	9; 6	9; 6
3	(Netherlands) (Finland)	Nicole Beumer; Nina Taimiaho	9; 6	9; 10	9; 5	9; 5

England
2
Semi-final 2

Ireland
1

			1	2	3	4	5
1	(England) (Republic of Ireland)	Sue Wright; Rebecca Best	2; 3
2	(England) (Republic of Ireland)	Cassie Jackman; Marjorie Croke	3; 0
3	(England) (Republic of Ireland)	Donna VardySusan Langley; Brona Conway	3; 0

=== Third place ===
Finland
3
Third place

Ireland
0

			1	2	3	4	5
1	(Finland) (Republic of Ireland)	Tuula Myllyniemi; Rebecca Best	9; 10	9; 1	9; 0	8; 10	10; 9
2	(Finland) (Republic of Ireland)	Minna Sinervo; Brona Conway	9; 3	9; 4	9; 1
3	(Finland) (Republic of Ireland)	Nina Taimiaho; Marjorie Croke	9; 4	9; 0	9; 3

=== Final ===
England
3
Final

Netherlands
0

			1	2	3	4	5
1	(England) (Netherlands)	Sue Wright; Babette Hoogendoorn
2	(England) (Netherlands)	Susan Langley; Marjolein Houtsma
3	(England) (Netherlands)	Cassie Jackman; Nicole Beumer
