= Alison Cumings =

English squash player

Personal information
- Born: 18 November 1961 (age 64) Dartford, Kent, England

Sport
- Country: England

Women's singles
- Highest ranking: No. 6 (May 1986)
Medal record
Representing England
Women's squash
World Team Squash Championships
| Gold medal – first place | 1985 | Dublin |
| Gold medal – first place | 1987 | Auckland |
| Gold medal – first place | 1989 | Warmond |
European Team Championships
| Gold medal – first place | 1984 Dublin | Team |
| Gold medal – first place | 1985 Barcelona | Team |
| Gold medal – first place | 1986 Aix-en-Provence | Team |
| Gold medal – first place | 1988 Warmond | Team |
| Gold medal – first place | 1989 Helsinki | Team |

Alison Cumings (born 18 November 1961) is a former English professional squash player. She reached a career high ranking of 6 in the world during May 1986.

== Biography ==
Cumings was born in Dartford in the county of Kent, England. She started playing squash as a junior, developing at Reigate Squash Club.

After winning the British Under-19 title, Cumings developed her career further, eventually reaching a world no. 4 ranking for women squash players. She was also the Women's British National Squash Champion in 1982, and part of the winning Women's World Team in 1985 in Dublin, where the England team beat New Zealand 2-1.

The successful England team went on to win the 1987 Women's World Team Squash Championships in Auckland, New Zealand and the 1989 Women's World Team Squash Championships in Warmond, in the Netherlands.

Cumings won five gold medals for the England women's national squash team at the European Squash Team Championships in 1984, 1985, 1986, 1988 and 1989.

She now lives in Leatherhead, Surrey, under the married name of Alison Malynn.
