= Scottish Squash =

Scottish sporting association

- Sport: Squash
- Founded: 1936
- Regional affiliation: European Squash Federation
- Location: Oriam, Edinburgh
- President: Haim Din
- CEO: Paul Macari
- Coach: Paul Bell / Jennifer Barsby

Official website
- www.scottishsquash.org
- (Scotland)

Scottish Squash is recognised as the national governing body for the sport of Squash in Scotland. The organisation has six regions where members of staff help coach and develop players. The regions are Highlands, Grampian, Central, Tayside & Fife, West and East.

== History ==
The organisation was founded in 1936 as the Scottish Squash Rackets Association (SRA). The first squash court in Scotland was at Fettes College in Edinburgh in 1928 and by the start of the World War II in 1939 there were 30 courts across Scotland. From 1968 the sport experienced a boom and saw 210 courts constructed in a ten-year period.

The women's SRA was formed in 1937 but amalgamated with the SRA in 1972.

In 1999 Wendy Maitland was the Grampian Development Officer for Scottish Squash.

The SRA became the Scottish Squash and Racketball Ltd from 2010 before changing its rebranding to Scottish Squash in 2017.

In 2025 Hakim Din was elected as the new president replacing Paul Macari who took the role of Chief Executive.

== See also ==
- Scotland men's national squash team
- Scotland women's national squash team
- Scottish National Squash Championships
