= David Pearson (squash player) =

English squash player

Personal information
- Born: 10 June 1959 (age 67) Kendal, England

Sport
- Country: England
- Handedness: Right-handed
Medal record
Men's squash
Representing England
European Team Championships
Gold medal – first place	1977 Sheffield	Team
Silver medal – second place	1980 Helsinki	Team
Gold medal – first place	1984 Dublin	Team
Gold medal – first place	1985 Barcelona	Team
Gold medal – first place	1986 Aix-en-Provence	Team

David Pearson (born 10 June 1959) is an English former professional squash player and national coach.

== Biography ==
Pearson born in Kendal, played for the Premier League champions Manchester Northern and then Chapel Allerton. After initially representing Cumbria, he represented Lancashire at full senior county level. In 1979 he was the British U23 champion.

Pearson won his first cap for England's successful win at the 1980 Home International Championships in Edinburgh. He went on to win four gold medals for the England men's national squash team at the European Squash Team Championships from 1977 to 1986.

in 1985, he won the Andy Gill Memorial and would reach a career high ranking of number two in the UK rankings.

In 1987 he won a record eighth Lancashire title. Pearson left Chapel Allerton to take up coaching at Harrogate and would later become the national coach of England for 15 years and helped England win titles at the Commonwealth Games and European Squash Team Championships.

In 2021 he was appointed national doubles coach of Scotland.
