= Paul Johnson (squash player) =

English squash player (born 1972)

Personal information
- Born: 18 July 1972 (age 54)

Sport

Men's singles
- Highest ranking: No. 4 (December 1998)
Medal record
Men's squash
Representing England
Commonwealth Games
Gold medal – first place	1998 Kuala Lumpur	Doubles
Bronze medal – third place	1998 Kuala Lumpur	Singles
Bronze medal – third place	2002 Manchester	Doubles
European Team Championships
Gold medal – first place	1996 Amsterdam	Team
Gold medal – first place	1997 Odense	Team
Gold medal – first place	1998 Helsinki	Team
Gold medal – first place	1999 Linz	Team
Gold medal – first place	2000 Vienna	Team
Gold medal – first place	2002 Böblingen	Team

Paul Johnson (born 18 July 1972) is a former professional squash player from England. He reached a career-high world ranking of World No. 4 in 1998 and won a gold medal at the Commonwealth Games.

== Biography ==
Johnson played for Greenwich in the London Youth Games when growing up and was inducted into the London Youth Games Hall of Fame in 2011. At the 1998 Commonwealth Games, he won a gold medal for England in Kuala Lumpur, in the men's doubles (partnering Mark Chaloner), and a bronze medal in the men's singles. Johnson won the British National Championship title in 1999.

Johnson was involved in a remarkable match in the first round of the British Open against Peter Nicol in 1997. In the third game, Johnson held a match-ball and appeared to win the point. The two players shook hands and walked off court, but the referee called them back and made them replay the disputed point. Nicol then went on to win the match (and ultimately reached the final).

Johnson won six gold medals for the England men's national squash team at the European Squash Team Championships from 1996 to 2002.

Johnson won another medal at the Commonwealth Games, after winning a bronze in the men's doubles with Mark Chaloner for the 2002 England team at the 2002 Commonwealth Games in Manchester.

Currently, Johnson is one of the main PSA SquashTV commentators, together with Joey Barrington. They are regarded as the humorous duo on this channel, often resorting to typical banter. Paul Johnson's favourite scoreline is 2–2 in the 5th game, accompanied by the catchphrase "There is nothing between them, Joey".
