= Christy Willstrop =

English squash player

Personal information
- Born: 18 September 1963 (age 62) York, England

Sport
- Country: England

Men's singles
- Highest ranking: No. 29 (May 1983)
Medal record
Men's squash
Representing England
European Team Championships
Silver medal – second place	1983 Munich	Team
Gold medal – first place	1984 Dublin	Team

Christopher Willstrop (born 18 September 1963) is a former English professional squash player. He reached a career high ranking of 29 in the world during May 1983.

== Biography ==
Willstrop was born in York on 18 September 1963 and was the son of the well known coach Malcolm Willstrop. He played for Greshams and then Redwood Lodge and represented Yorkshire at county level.

In 1976 he was the British U14 champion and subsequently won three more British age titles; U16 (1977), U19 (1978) and U23 (1982). He earned a record 25 caps for England at junior level before making nine full international appearances for England.

Willstrop won a gold medal for the England men's national squash team at the European Squash Team Championships during the 1984 European Squash Team Championships. Willstrop later played for Pontefract

His stepsibling is James Willstrop.
