= Squash at the 2002 Commonwealth Games =

- Venue: National Squash Centre
- Location: Manchester, England
- Dates: 25 July – 4 August 2002

Squash at the 2002 Commonwealth Games was the second appearance of Squash at the Commonwealth Games. The squash competition took place in Manchester, England, from 25 July – 4 August 2002. There were no bronze medal play off matches because both losing semi-finalists were awarded a bronze medal.

The events were held at the £3.5 million National Squash Centre, which was built specifically for the Games.

New Zealand topped the squash medal table by virtue of winning two gold medals.

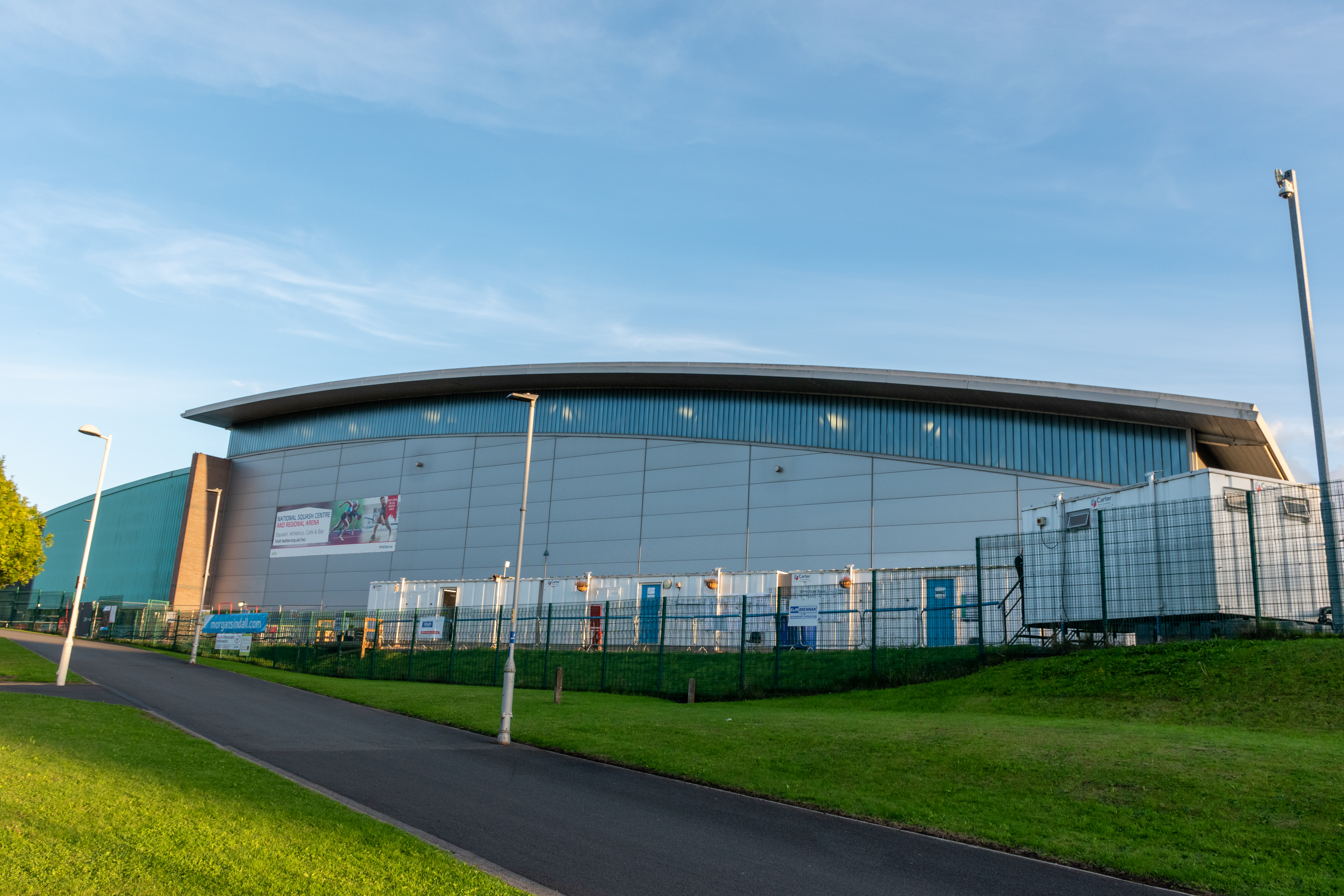
The National Squash Centre in 2022

== Medal table ==
* Host nation (England)

Rank	Nation	Gold	Silver	Bronze	Total
1	New Zealand	2	1	0	3
2	England*	1	2	4	7
3	Australia	1	1	6	8
4	Canada	1	0	0	1
5	Malaysia	0	1	0	1
Totals (5 entries)		5	5	10	20

== Medallists ==
Event	Gold	Silver	Bronze
Men's singles	Jonathon Power; Canada	Peter Nicol; England	Stewart Boswell; Australia
Men's singles	Jonathon Power; Canada	Peter Nicol; England	David Palmer; Australia
Women's singles	Sarah Fitz-Gerald; Australia	Carol Owens; New Zealand	Rachael Grinham; Australia
Women's singles	Sarah Fitz-Gerald; Australia	Carol Owens; New Zealand	Cassie Jackman; England
Men's doubles	Lee Beachill & Peter Nicol; England	Stewart Boswell & Anthony Ricketts; Australia	David Palmer & Paul Price; Australia
Men's doubles	Lee Beachill & Peter Nicol; England	Stewart Boswell & Anthony Ricketts; Australia	Mark Chaloner & Paul Johnson; England
Women's doubles	Carol Owens & Leilani Rorani; New Zealand	Tania Bailey & Cassie Jackman; England	Natalie Grinham & Rachael Grinham; Australia
Women's doubles	Carol Owens & Leilani Rorani; New Zealand	Tania Bailey & Cassie Jackman; England	Linda Charman & Fiona Geaves; England
Mixed doubles	Glen Wilson & Leilani Rorani; New Zealand	Ong Beng Hee & Nicol David; Malaysia	Joe Kneipp & Robyn Cooper; Australia
Mixed doubles	Glen Wilson & Leilani Rorani; New Zealand	Ong Beng Hee & Nicol David; Malaysia	Chris Walker & Fiona Geaves; England

== Results ==
=== Men's singles (26-31 July) ===
Round of 16
(Canada) Jonathon Power	9	9	9
(Pakistan) Mansoor Zaman	0	0	2
(England) Lee Beachill	9	9	9
(Wales) David Evans	2	4	3
(Australia) Stewart Boswell	9	9	9
(Pakistan) Shahid Zaman Khan	1	6	3
(Australia) Paul Price	9	9	9
(England) Mark Chaloner	7	6	4
(England) Peter Nicol	9	9	10
(Australia) Anthony Ricketts	5	0	8
(Canada) Graham Ryding	3	9	9	9
(Malaysia) Ong Beng Hee	9	4	2	0
(Australia) David Palmer	9	9	9
(Wales) Alex Gough	6	7	7
(England) Chris Walker	3	9	7	9	9
(Scotland) Martin Heath	9	6	9	7	1

Quarter finals
(Canada) Power	3	9	9	9
(England) Beachill	9	0	7	4
(Australia) Boswell	6	9	9	9
(Australia) Price	9	4	4	2
(England) Nicol	9	9	9
(Canada) Ryding	1	2	3
(Australia) Palmer	9	9	9
(England) Walker	5	1	1

Semi finals
(Canada) Power	7	9	9	5	9
(Australia) Boswell	9	2	1	9	0
(England) Nicol	9	9	9
(Australia) Palmer	7	1	5

Final
(Canada) Power	9	4	9	9
(England) Nicol	4	9	3	0

=== Women's singles (27-31 July) ===
Round of 16
(Australia) Sarah Fitz-Gerald	9	9	9
(Malaysia) Sharon Wee	2	0	2
(England) Stephanie Brind	9	2	7	9	9
(Scotland) Wendy Maitland	5	9	9	0	0
(Australia) Rachael Grinham	9	9	9
(Scotland) Pamela Nimmo	4	3	4
(New Zealand) Leilani Rorani	9	8	9	9
(Malaysia) Nicol David	5	10	5	2
(New Zealand) Carol Owens	9	9	9
(Northern Ireland) Madeline Perry	0	0	4
(England) Tania Bailey	9	9	9
(Canada) Melanie Jans	1	3	3
(England) Cassie Jackman	9	9	9
(New Zealand) Shelley Kitchen	2	0	6
(England) Linda Charman	9	9	9
(Australia) Natalie Grinham	7	1	1

Quarter finals
(Australia) Fitz-Gerald	10	9	9
(England) Brind	8	3	1
(Australia) Grinham	9	10	9
(New Zealand) Rorani	1	8	6
(New Zealand) Owens	10	9	9
(England) Bailey	9	0	1
(England) Jackman	9	1	9	7	9
(England) Charman	2	9	1	9	2

Semi finals
(Australia) Fitz-Gerald	9	9	9
(Australia) Grinham	2	2	6
(New Zealand) Owens	3	9	9	9
(England) Jackman	9	5	1	5

Final
(Australia) Fitz-Gerald	9	9	2	10
(New Zealand) Owens	5	0	9	9

=== Men's doubles (31 July-4 Aug) ===
Quarter finals
(England) Lee Beachill & Peter Nicol	15	9	15
(Wales) David Evans & Alex Gough	6	15	10
(Australia) David Palmer & Paul Price	15	15
(Wales) Gavin Jones & Scott Fitzgerald	11	12
(Australia) Stewart Boswell & Anthony Ricketts	15	17
(Scotland) Martin Heath & Neil Frankland	12	15
(England) Paul Johnson & Mark Chaloner	15	15
(Pakistan) Shahid Zaman Khan & Mansoor Zaman	4	5

Semi finals
(England) Beachill & Nicol	13	15	15
(Australia) Palmer & Price	15	9	9
(Australia) Boswell & Ricketts	15	13	15
(England) Johnson & Chaloner	8	15	12

Final
(England) Beachill & Nicol	15	15
(Australia) Boswell & Ricketts	11	12

=== Women's doubles (31 July-4 Aug) ===
Quarter finals
(New Zealand) Leilani Rorani & Carol Owens	15	15
(Canada) Margo Green & Melanie Jans	8	8
(Australia) Natalie Grinham & Rachael Grinham	15	15
(New Zealand) Lara Petera & Shelley Kitchen	8	8
(England) Tania Bailey & Cassie Jackman	15	15
(Wales) Katrina Hogan & Karen Hargreaves	4	4
(England) Fiona Geaves & Linda Charman	15	15
(Australia) Sarah Fitz-Gerald & Liz Irving	11	5

Semi finals
(New Zealand) Rorani & Owens	15	15
(Australia) Grinham & Grinham	13	8
(England) Bailey & Jackman	15	16	17
(England) Geaves & Charman	3	17	15

Final
(New Zealand) Rorani & Owens	15	5	15
(England) Bailey & Jackman	11	15	13

=== Mixed doubles (31 July-4 Aug) ===
Quarter finals
(New Zealand) Glen Wilson & Leilani Rorani	15	15
(New Zealand) Daniel Sharplin & Carol Owens	13	3
(Australia) Joseph Kneipp & Robyn Cooper	15	15
(England) Paul Johnson & Stephanie Brind	11	12
(Malaysia) Ong Beng Hee & Nicol David	15	15
(Wales) Gavin Jones & Karen Hargreaves	13	7
(England) Chris Walker & Fiona Geaves	17	13	15
(Australia) Paul Price & Sarah Fitz-Gerald	16	15	7

Semi finals
(New Zealand) Wilson & Rorani	15	15
(Australia) Kneipp & Cooper	11	11
(Malaysia) Beng Hee & David	12	15
(England) Walker & Geaves	15	14

Final
(New Zealand) Wilson & Rorani	15	15
(Malaysia) Beng Hee & David	11	9
