= England men's national squash team =

England
- Coach: Stuart Crawford
- Association: England Squash & Racketball

World Team Championships
- Titles: 5
- Runners-up: 6
- Best finish: 1st

European Team Championships
- Titles: 46
- Runners-up: 5
- Best finish: 1st

The England men's national squash team represents England in international squash team competitions, and is governed by England Squash.

Since 1981, England has won five World Team Squash Championships titles, and 46 European Squash Team Championships titles (since 1973). They are the reigning European Champions, while their most recent World Team Squash Championships title came in 2013.

Stuart Crawford took over as coach from David Campion in 2024.

== Results ==
=== World Team Squash Championships ===
- For the English players participation before 1981, see Great Britain men's national squash team

Year	Result	Position	W	L	Team
(Sweden) Stockholm 1981	Semi-final	4th	4	3	Gawain Briars, Phil Kenyon, John Le Lievre, Ian Robinson
(New Zealand) Auckland 1983	Final	2nd	8	1	Gawain Briars, Hiddy Jahan, Phil Kenyon, Geoff Williams
(Egypt) Cairo 1985	Semi-final	4th	6	3	Gawain Briars, Jamie Hickox, Hiddy Jahan, Phil Kenyon
(England) London 1987	Semi-final	3rd	7	1	Bryan Beeson, Gawain Briars, Neil Harvey, Phil Kenyon
Singapore 1989	Semi-final	3rd	6	2	Bryan Beeson, Del Harris, Jason Nicolle, Simon Parke
(Finland) Helsinki 1991	Final	2nd	4	1	Del Harris, Peter Marshall, Jason Nicolle, Chris Walker
(Pakistan) Karachi 1993	Semi-final	3rd	4	1	Peter Marshall, Simon Parke, Chris Walker, Phil Whitlock
(Egypt) Cairo 1995	Champions	1st	6	0	Mark Chaloner, Del Harris, Simon Parke, Chris Walker
(Malaysia) Petaling Jaya 1997	Champions	1st	5	1	Del Harris, Peter Marshall, Simon Parke, Chris Walker
(Egypt) Cairo 1999	Semi-final	3rd	5	1	Mark Cairns, Paul Johnson, Simon Parke, Chris Walker
(Australia) Melbourne 2001	Semi-final	3rd	6	1	Lee Beachill, Mark Chaloner, Paul Johnson, Chris Walker
(Austria) Vienna 2003	Semi-final	3rd	6	1	Lee Beachill, Nick Matthew, Peter Nicol, James Willstrop
(Pakistan) Islamabad 2005	Champions	1st	6	0	Lee Beachill, Nick Matthew, Peter Nicol, James Willstrop
(India) Chennai 2007	Champions	1st	6	0	Peter Barker, Lee Beachill, Nick Matthew, James Willstrop
(Denmark) Odense 2009	Semi-final	4th	5	2	Peter Barker, Adrian Grant, Nick Matthew, James Willstrop
(Germany) Paderborn 2011	Final	2nd	6	1	Peter Barker, Nick Matthew, Daryl Selby, James Willstrop
(France) Mulhouse 2013	Champions	1st	7	0	Adrian Grant, Nick Matthew, Daryl Selby, James Willstrop
(France) Marseille 2017	Final	2nd	6	1	Nick Matthew, Daryl Selby, Adrian Waller, James Willstrop
(United States) Washington, D.C. 2019	Final	2nd	6	1	Declan James, Daryl Selby, Adrian Waller, James Willstrop
(New Zealand) Tauranga 2023	Final	2nd	5	1	Patrick Rooney, Marwan El Shorbagy, Mohamed El Shorbagy, Adrian Waller
Hong Kong 2024	Final	2nd	5	1	Mohamed El Shorbagy, Nathan Lake, Curtis Malik, Marwan El Shorbagy
Total	21/21	5 Titles	119	23	

=== European Team Squash Championships ===
Year	Result	Team	Ref
1973 (Scotland) Edinburgh	Gold medal	Philip Ayton, Stuart Courtney, John Easter, Paul Millman, Bryan Patterson	
1974 (Sweden) Stockholm	Gold medal	Philip Ayton, Paul Millman, Ian Nuttall, Michael Thurgur, Peter Verow	
1975 (Republic of Ireland) Dublin	Gold medal	Mike Corby, Pat Kirton, Jonathan Leslie, John Richardson, Ian Robinson	
1976 (Belgium) Brussels	Gold medal	Phil Kenyon, Jonathan Leslie, Paul Millman, Ian Robinson, Peter Verow	
1977 (England) Sheffield	Gold medal	Philip Ayton, Jonathan Leslie, Barry O'Connor, David Pearson, Ian Robinson	
1978 (Netherlands) Amsterdam	Gold medal	Gawain Briars, Jonathan Leslie, Phil Kenyon, Ian Robinson, John Le Lievre	
1979 (Germany) Hamburg	Gold medal	Gawain Briars, Andrew Dwyer, Phil Kenyon, Ian Robinson, Peter Verow	
1980 (Finland) Helsinki	Silver medal	Philip Ayton, Andrew Dwyer, Ian Nuttall, David Pearson, Barry O'Connor	
1981 (Netherlands) Amsterdam	Gold medal	David Thomas, Andrew Dwyer, Peter Verow	
1982 (Wales) Cardiff	Gold medal	Gawain Briars, Andrew Dwyer, Phil Kenyon, Ian Robinson, Peter Verow, John Le Lievre, Geoff Hoare	
1983 (Germany) Munich	Silver medal	Gawain Briars, Ashley Naylor, Geoff Williams, Peter Verow, Christy Willstrop	
1984 (Republic of Ireland) Dublin	Gold medal	Martin Bodimeade, Neil Harvey, Ashley Naylor, David Pearson, Geoff Williams, Christy Willstrop	
1985 (Spain) Barcelona	Gold medal	Martin Bodimeade, Bryan Beeson, David Pearson, Ashley Naylor, Geoff Williams	
1986 (France) Aix-en-Provence	Gold medal	Martin Bodimeade, Bryan Beeson, Gawain Briars, David Pearson, Geoff Williams	
1987 (Austria) Vienna	Gold medal	Martin Bodimeade, Bryan Beeson, Neil Harvey, Jamie Hickox, Geoff Williams	
1988 (Netherlands) Warmond	Gold medal	Martin Bodimeade, Bryan Beeson, Jason Nicolle, Phil Whitlock, Geoff Williams	
1989 (Finland) Helsinki	Gold medal	Bryan Beeson, Paul Carter, Paul Gregory, Del Harris, Neil Harvey, Chris Walker	
1990 (Switzerland) Zürich	Gold medal	Bryan Beeson, Paul Carter, Del Harris, Peter Marshall, Simon Parke, Chris Walker	
1991 (Germany) Gelsenkirchen	Gold medal	Del Harris, Peter Marshall, Jason Nicolle, Simon Parke, Chris Walker	
1992 (France) Aix-en-Provence	Bronze medal	Paul Gregory, Del Harris, Peter Marshall, Jason Nicolle, Chris Walker	
1993 (France) Aix-en-Provence	Gold medal	Tony Hands, Simon Parke, Chris Walker, Phil Whitlock	
1994 (Germany) Zoetermeer	Gold medal	Tony Hands, Stephen Meads, Jason Nicolle, Phil Whitlock	
1995 (Netherlands) Amsterdam	Gold medal	Mark Cairns, Del Harris, Simon Parke, Chris Walker	
1996 (Netherlands) Amsterdam	Gold medal	Mark Cairns, Mark Chaloner, Paul Johnson, Stephen Meads, Chris Walker	
1997 (Denmark) Odense	Gold medal	Mark Cairns, Paul Johnson, Stephen Meads, Danny Meddings, Nick Taylor	
1998 (Finland) Helsinki	Gold medal	Marcus Berrett, Mark Chaloner, Del Harris, Paul Johnson, Simon Parke, Chris Walker	
1999 (Austria) Linz	Gold medal	Lee Beachill, Marcus Berrett, Paul Johnson, Simon Parke, Chris Walker	
2000 (Austria) Vienna	Gold medal	Mark Chaloner, Del Harris, Peter Marshall, Paul Johnson, Simon Parke	
2001 (Netherlands) Eindhoven	Gold medal	Lee Beachill, Mark Chaloner, Simon Parke, Nick Taylor	
2002 (Germany) Böblingen	Gold medal	Lee Beachill, Mark Chaloner, Del Harris, Paul Johnson, Chris Walker	
2003 (England) Nottingham	Gold medal	Lee Beachill, Mark Chaloner, Peter Nicol, Simon Parke, James Willstrop	
2004 (France) Rennes	Gold medal	Lee Beachill, Adrian Grant, Nick Matthew, Peter Nicol, James Willstrop	
2005 (Netherlands) Amsterdam	Gold medal	Lee Beachill, Nick Matthew, Peter Nicol, Simon Parke, James Willstrop	
2006 (Austria) Vienna	Gold medal	Peter Barker, Lee Beachill, Nick Matthew, Peter Nicol, James Willstrop	
2007 (Italy) Riccione	Gold medal	Peter Barker, Lee Beachill, Adrian Grant, Nick Matthew, James Willstrop	
2008 (Netherlands) Amsterdam	Gold medal	Peter Barker, Joey Barrington, Lee Beachill, Adrian Grant, James Willstrop	
2009 (Sweden) Malmö	Gold medal	Peter Barker, Adrian Grant, Nick Matthew, Daryl Selby, Alister Walker	
2010 (France) Aix-en-Provence	Gold medal	Peter Barker, Adrian Grant, Nick Matthew, Daryl Selby, James Willstrop	
2011 (Finland) Espoo	Gold medal	Peter Barker, Jonathan Kemp, Nick Matthew, Daryl Selby James Willstrop	
2012 (Germany) Nuremberg	Gold medal	Peter Barker, Nick Matthew, Tom Richards, Daryl Selby James Willstrop	
2013 (Netherlands) Amsterdam	Gold medal	Peter Barker, Adrian Grant, Nick Matthew, Daryl Selby, James Willstrop	
2014 (Italy) Riccione	Gold medal	Peter Barker, Adrian Grant, Nick Matthew, Daryl Selby, James Willstrop	
2015 (Denmark) Herning	Silver medal	Peter Barker, Daryl Selby, Chris Simpson, Adrian Waller, James Willstrop	
2016 (Poland) Warsaw	Gold medal	Tom Richards, Daryl Selby, Chris Simpson, Adrian Waller, James Willstrop	
2017 (Finland) Helsinki	Silver medal	Declan James, Nick Matthew, Tom Richards, Daryl Selby, James Willstrop	
2018 (Poland) Wrocław	Silver medal	Declan James, Nick Matthew, Tom Richards, Daryl Selby, James Willstrop	
2019 (England) Birmingham	Gold medal	Declan James, Tom Richards, Daryl Selby, Adrian Waller, James Willstrop	
2022 (Netherlands) Eindhoven	Gold medal	Nathan Lake, George Parker, Patrick Rooney, Adrian Waller, James Willstrop	
2023 (Finland) Helsinki	Gold medal	Charlie Lee, Curtis Malik, Patrick Rooney, Mohamed El Shorbagy, Nick Wall, Adrian Waller	
2024 (Switzerland) Uster	Gold medal	Curtis Malik, Marwan El Shorbagy, Mohamed El Shorbagy, Ben Smith, Tom Walsh	
2025 (Poland) Wrocław	Gold medal	Jonah Bryant, Curtis Malik, Marwan El Shorbagy, Mohamed El Shorbagy, Tom Walsh	
2026 (Netherlands) Amsterdam	Gold medal	Curtis Malik, Marwan El Shorbagy, Patrick Rooney, Sam Todd, Sam Osborne-Wylde	

== See also ==
- Squash in England
- England Squash
- Great Britain men's national squash team
- England women's national squash team
- British National Squash Championships
