= Peter Verow =

English squash player

Personal information
- Born: 20 May 1953 (age 73) Durham, England

Sport
- Country: England
- Handedness: Right-handed
Medal record
Men's squash
Representing Great Britain
World Team Championships
Gold medal – first place	1979 Brisbane	Team
Representing England
European Team Championships
Gold medal – first place	1974 Stockholm	Team
Gold medal – first place	1976 Brussels	Team
Gold medal – first place	1979 Hamburg	Team
Gold medal – first place	1981 Amsterdam	Team
Gold medal – first place	1982 Cardiff	Team
Silver medal – second place	1983 Munich	Team

Peter Graham Verow (born 20 May 1953) is an English former professional squash player.

== Biography ==
Verow born in Durham, England, was British Universities champion and British junior champion in 1972 and represented Durham at county level.

Verow was a member of the Great Britain team with Jonathan Leslie, Phil Kenyon and Andrew Dwyer that won the 1979 Men's World Team Squash Championships. In the final against Pakistan, he defeated Fahim Gul in five sets. He also went on to win five gold medals for the England men's national squash team at the European Squash Team Championships from 1974 to 1982.

Additionally in 1978, Verow was the British national champion after defeating Phil Kenyon in the final.

Verow became a Consultant Occupational Health Physician but in 2007 he suffered from depression.
