= Neil Harvey (squash player) =

English squash player (born 1959)

Personal information
- Born: 16 April 1959 (age 67) London, England

Sport
- Country: England

Men's singles
- Highest ranking: No. 17 (January 1988)
Medal record
Men's squash
Representing England
European Team Championships
Gold medal – first place	1984 Dublin	Team
Gold medal – first place	1987 Vienna	Team
Gold medal – first place	1989 Helsinki	Team

Neil Harvey (born 16 April 1959), is a former English professional squash player.

== Biography ==
He won the Essex championship in 1981 before representing the England Under-23 team. He made his debut for England in 1984 and was part of the 1987 Men's World Team Squash Championships English team.

harvey won three gold medals for the England men's national squash team at the European Squash Team Championships in 1984, 1987 and 1989.

Harvey currently lives in Wolfville, Nova Scotia, and is one of the top squash coaches in the world. Neil plays at Saint Mary's University squash courts many days a week and coaches people from five years old to people in their 40s.
