= Ashley Naylor (squash player) =

English squash player (born 1960)

Personal information
- Nationality: British (English)
- Born: 23 August 1960 (age 65) Leeds, England

Sport

Men's singles
- Highest ranking: No. 30 (May 1984)
Medal record
Men's squash
Representing England
European Team Championships
Silver medal – second place	1983 Munich	Team
Gold medal – first place	1984 Dublin	Team
Gold medal – first place	1985 Barcelona	Team

Ashley Naylor (born 23 August 1960) is a former English professional squash player.

== Biography ==
Naylor was born in Leeds but lived in Batley, Yorkshire. He first took up squash in 1973 and became Yorkshire champion in 1983 and 1984. He became a full English international in 1980.

Naylor won two gold medals for the England men's national squash team at the European Squash Team Championships in 1984 and 1985.
