= 1995 Men's World Team Squash Championships =

Men's World Team 1995
- 15th World Men's Team Championship
- Location: (Egypt) Cairo
- Date: 14–18 November 1995

Results
- Champions: England
- Runners-up: Pakistan
- Third place: Egypt

The 1995 Men's World Team Squash Championships were held in Egypt and took place from 14 November until 18 November 1995.

== Seeds ==
1. Australia
2. Pakistan
3. England
4. Finland
5. New Zealand
6. Egypt
7. Sweden
8. Germany

== Results ==
=== Pool A ===
Team one	Team two	Score
Australia	(Egypt) Finland	2-1
Australia	New Zealand	2-1
Australia	Germany	3-0
Finland	New Zealand	2-1
Germany	Finland	2-1
New Zealand	Germany	2-1

Pos	Nation	Team	P	W	L	Pts
1	Australia	Brett Martin, Rodney Eyles, Anthony Hill, Craig Rowland	3	3	0	6
2	Finland	Sami Elopuro, Juha Raumolin, Olle Poutiainen, Mika Monto	3	1	2	2
2	New Zealand	Glen Wilson, Wayne Werder, Paul Steel, Daniel Sharplin	3	1	2	2
4	Germany	Hansi Wiens, Simon Frenz, Florian Pössl, Stefan Leifels	3	1	2	2

=== Pool B ===
Team one	Team two	Score
England	Pakistan	2-1
England	Sweden	3-0
England	Egypt	3-0
Pakistan	Sweden	3-0
Pakistan	Egypt	2-1
Egypt	Sweden	2-1

Pos	Nation	Team	P	W	L	Pts
1	England	Del Harris, Simon Parke, Mark Chaloner, Chris Walker	3	3	0	6
2	Pakistan	Jansher Khan, Zarak Jahan Khan, Mir Zaman Gul, Zubair Jahan Khan	3	2	1	4
3	Egypt	Ahmed Barada, Amir Wagih, Omar El Borolossy, Ahmed Faizy	3	1	2	2
4	Sweden	Fredrik Johnson, Daniel Forslund, Peter Sjosten, Anders Thoren	3	0	3	0

=== Pool C ===
Team one	Team two	Score
Canada	Scotland	3-0
Canada	Austria	3-0
Canada	(Republic of Ireland) Ireland	2-1
(Republic of Ireland) Ireland	Austria	2-1
(Republic of Ireland) Ireland	Scotland	2-1
Scotland	Austria	2-1

Pos	Nation	Team	P	W	L	Pts
1	Canada	Jonathon Power, Graham Ryding, Jamie Crombie, Gary Waite	3	3	0	6
2	(Republic of Ireland) Ireland	Derek Ryan, Steve Richardson, Eoin Ryan	3	2	1	4
3	Scotland	David Gordon, Alan Thomson, Alasdair Taylor, Barry Sutherland	3	1	2	2
4	Austria	David Sabitzer, Clemens Wallishauser, Chris Wind, Gerhard Schedlbauer	3	0	3	0

=== Pool D ===
Team one	Team two	Score
South Africa	Wales	1-2
South Africa	Netherlands	2-1
South Africa	France	2-1
Wales	Netherlands	2-1
France	Wales	2-1
France	Netherlands	2-1

Pos	Nation	Team	P	W	L	Pts
1	South Africa	Craig Wapnick, Rodney Durbach, Glenn Whittaker, Mike Tootill	3	2	1	4
2	Wales	David Evans, Alex Gough, Gareth Davies, Jeff Dark	3	2	1	4
2	France	Julien Bonetat, Thierry Lincou, Jean-Michel Arcucci, Sameer Khan	3	2	1	4
4	Netherlands	Lucas Buit, Michael Vertogen, Eric Smit, Raymond Scheffer	3	0	3	0

=== Quarter-finals ===
Team one	Team two	Score
Pakistan	New Zealand	2-1
Australia	South Africa	3-0
England	Canada	3-0
Egypt	Finland	2-1

=== Semi-finals ===
Team one	Team two	Score
England	Egypt	3-0
Pakistan	Australia	2-1

=== Third Place Play Off ===
Team one	Team two	Score
Egypt	Australia	2-1

=== Final ===
England
2
FINAL
Cairo Stadium, Cairo, Egypt
18 November 1995

Pakistan
1

			1	2	3	4	5
1	(England) (Pakistan)	Simon Parke; Jansher Khan	2; 9	5; 9	4; 9
2	(England) (Pakistan)	Del Harris; Zarak Jahan Khan	9; 1	9; 2	9; 2
3	(England) (Pakistan)	Mark Chaloner; Mir Zaman Gul	9; 1	9; 3	10; 9

== See also ==
- World Team Squash Championships
- World Squash Federation
- World Open (squash)

Preceded by Pakistan; 1993	Squash World Team; Egypt; 1995	Succeeded by Malaysia; 1997
