= Jaakko Vähämaa =

Finnish squash player (born 1993)

Personal information
- Born: 16 August 1993 (age 32) Lohja, Finland
- Height: 176 cm (5 ft 9 in)
- Weight: 68 kg (150 lb)

Sport
- Country: Finland
- Coached by: Ari Pelkonen
- Retired: Active

Men's singles
- Highest ranking: No. 132 (September 2016)
- Current ranking: No. 392 (February 2018)
- Updated on February, 2018

Jaakko Vähämaa (born 16 August 1993 in Lohja) is a Finnish professional squash player. As a junior, he won the Finnish Nationals 3 times in his age group. As of February 2018, he was ranked number 392 in the world. To date, his highest ranking has been number 132 in the world. He has reached the final rounds of many professional tournaments. He is in Finland men's national squash team and has represented his country internationally.
