= 1979 Men's World Team Squash Championships =

Squash event

Men's World Team 1979
- 7th World Men's Team Championship
- Location: Brisbane, Australia
- Date: October 17–28, 1979

Results
- Champions: (United Kingdom) Great Britain
- Runners-up: Pakistan
- Third place: Australia

The 1979 Men's Stellar World Team Amateur Squash Championships were held in Brisbane in Australia, and took place from October 17 to October 28, 1979. This was the last World Amateur Championship before the game went open.

== Results ==
=== Pool A ===
Team one	Team two	Score
Pakistan	Australia	2-1
Pakistan	Sweden	3-0
Pakistan	India	3-0
Pakistan	United States	3-0
Pakistan	(Republic of Ireland) Ireland	3-0
Pakistan	Hong Kong	3-0
Australia	Sweden	3-0
Australia	India	2-1
Australia	United States	3-0
Australia	(Republic of Ireland) Ireland	3-0
Australia	Hong Kong	3-0
Sweden	India	2-1
Sweden	United States	2-1
Sweden	(Republic of Ireland) Ireland	3-0
Sweden	Hong Kong	3-0
India	United States	3-0
India	(Republic of Ireland) Ireland	3-0
India	Hong Kong	3-0
United States	(Republic of Ireland) Ireland	2-1
United States	Hong Kong	3-0
(Republic of Ireland) Ireland	Hong Kong	3-0

Pos	Nation	Team	P	W	L	Pts
1	Pakistan	Daulat Khan, Fahim Gul, Atlas Khan, Zahir Hussein Khan	6	6	0	12
2	Australia	Glen Brumby, Frank Donnelly, Ian Yeates, Ross Thorne	6	5	1	10
3	Sweden	Lars Kvant, Mikael Hellstrom, Johan Stockenberg, Bosse Boström	6	4	2	8
4	India	Anil Nayer, Raj Manchanda, Nikhil Senapati, Ananth Nayak	6	3	3	6
5	United States	Gil Mateer, Ned Edwards, Mark Alger, Jon Foster	6	2	4	4
6	(Republic of Ireland) Ireland	Bernard O'Gorman, Richard Power, David Gotto, Ben Cranwell	6	1	5	2
7	Hong Kong	Jacky Choy, Kai Ki Chan, Simon Swallow, Jabar Wasan	6	0	6	0

=== Pool B ===
Team one	Team two	Score
(United Kingdom) Great Britain	Egypt	2-1
(United Kingdom) Great Britain	New Zealand	2-1
(United Kingdom) Great Britain	Canada	3-0
(United Kingdom) Great Britain	Nigeria	3-0
(United Kingdom) Great Britain	Malaysia	3-0
(United Kingdom) Great Britain	Kuwait	3-0
Egypt	New Zealand	2-1
Egypt	Canada	2-1
Egypt	Nigeria	3-0
Egypt	Malaysia	3-0
Egypt	Kuwait	3-0
New Zealand	Canada	3-0
New Zealand	Nigeria	3-0
New Zealand	Malaysia	3-0
New Zealand	Kuwait	3-0
Canada	Nigeria	2-1
Canada	Malaysia	3-0
Canada	Kuwait	3-0
Nigeria	Malaysia	3-0
Nigeria	Kuwait	3-0
Malaysia	Kuwait	3-0

Pos	Nation	Team	P	W	L	Pts
1	(United Kingdom) Great Britain	Jonathan Leslie, Phil Kenyon, Peter Verow, Andrew Dwyer	6	6	0	12
2	Egypt	Allam Soliman, Magdi Saad, Mohammed Awad, Mohamed Badram	6	5	1	10
3	New Zealand	Ross Norman, Craig Blackwood, Robin Espie, Neven Barbour	6	4	2	8
4	Canada	Jug Walia, Todd Binns, Mark Gallagher, Mike Desaulniers	6	3	3	6
5	Nigeria	John Solomon, Friday Omoben, T Afolobi, Okanlowan Martins	6	2	4	4
6	Malaysia	Tony Tiah, Sajaad Maniam, Khai Hock Ong, Jerry Loo	6	1	5	2
7	Kuwait	Esam Al-Modaf, Tareq Al-Owayesh, Al-Ramzl Bader, J Ashkiniy	6	0	6	0

=== Semi-finals ===
Team one	Team two	Score
Pakistan	Egypt	2-1
(United Kingdom) Great Britain	Australia	2-1

=== Third Place Play Off ===
Team one	Team two	Score
Australia	Egypt	2-1

=== Final ===
Great Britain
3
FINAL
Brisbane, Australia
27 October 1979

Pakistan
0

			1	2	3	4	5
1	(United Kingdom) (Pakistan)	Jonathan Leslie; Atlas Khan	4; 9	4; 9	9; 6	9; 0	9; 0
2	(United Kingdom) (Pakistan)	Phil Kenyon; Daulat Khan	9; 3	9; 5	9; 5
3	(United Kingdom) (Pakistan)	Peter Verow; Fahim Gul	9; 6	9; 6	2; 9	4; 9	9; 3

== See also ==
- World Team Squash Championships
- World Squash Federation
- World Open (squash)

Preceded by Canada; 1977	Squash World Team (Brisbane) Australia; 1979	Succeeded by Sweden; 1981
