= Alasdair Taylor (squash player) =

Scottish squash player (born 1965)

Alasdair Taylor (born 1965) is a squash player who represented the Scotland men's national squash team.

Taylor represented Scotland at the 1984 World Junior Squash Championships. The following season he suffered a serious hip injury and was on the sidelines for six months. Whilst studying at the University of Portsmouth he played No 1 for Fair Oak in the Hampshire Premier League.

Taylor made his full Scotland debut in January 1987 at the home international championships. An annual event involving the national teams of Scotland, England, Wales and Ireland. Taylor regularly represented Scotland at the annual home international championships until the mid 1990s.

From 1987 to 1996 he also represented Scotland at the European Squash Team Championships and the WSF World Team Squash Championships.
