= Brett Newton =

American rugby union player

Brett Newton is an American former rugby union player. She represented runners-up, the United States, at the 1994 Women's Rugby World Cup in Scotland.
