= Geoff Williams (squash player) =

English squash player (born 1957)

Personal information
- Born: 21 November 1957 (age 68) India

Sport
- Country: England

Men's singles
- Highest ranking: No. 10 (August 1985)
Medal record
Men's squash
Representing England
European Team Championships
Silver medal – second place	1983 Munich	Team
Gold medal – first place	1984 Dublin	Team
Gold medal – first place	1985 Barcelona	Team
Gold medal – first place	1986 Aix-en-Provence	Team
Gold medal – first place	1987 Vienna	Team
Gold medal – first place	1988 Warmond	Team

Geoff Williams (born 21 November 1957) is a former English professional squash player.

== Biography ==
Williams was born in India. He took up squash at Downside School and became a professional in 1981. He represented England at the 1983 Men's World Team Squash Championships.

Williams won five consecutive gold medals for the England men's national squash team at the European Squash Team Championships from 1984 to 1988.

Williams was the British national champion in 1984.
