= 1997 Men's World Team Squash Championships =

Men's World Team 1997
- 16th World Men's Team Championship
- Location: Malaysia
- Date: November 10–15, 1997

Results
- Champions: England
- Runners-up: Canada
- Third place: Australia

The 1997 Men's ASCM Sharp World Team Squash Championships were held in Malaysia and took place from November 10-15, 1997.

== Results ==
=== Pool A ===
| Team one | Team two | Score |
|---|---|---|
| Canada | Germany | 2-1 |
| Canada | England | 2-1 |
| Canada | Pakistan | 3-0 |
| England | Pakistan | 3-0 |
| England | Germany | 3-0 |
| Pakistan | Germany | 2-1 |

| Pos | Nation | Team | P | W | L | Pts |
|---|---|---|---|---|---|---|
| 1 | Canada | Jonathon Power, Graham Ryding, Gary Waite, Kelly Patrick | 3 | 3 | 0 | 6 |
| 2 | England | Simon Parke, Del Harris, Chris Walker, Peter Marshall | 3 | 2 | 1 | 4 |
| 3 | Pakistan | Zubair Jahan Khan, Amjad Khan, Kumail Mehmood | 3 | 1 | 2 | 2 |
| 4 | Germany | Simon Frenz, Florian Pössl, Oliver Kowalski | 3 | 0 | 3 | 0 |

=== Pool B ===
| Team one | Team two | Score |
|---|---|---|
| Australia | Finland | 3-0 |
| Australia | Wales | 3-0 |
| Australia | Egypt | 3-0 |
| Egypt | Wales | 2-1 |
| Egypt | Finland | 2-1 |
| Finland | Wales | 2-1 |

| Pos | Nation | Team | P | W | L | Pts |
|---|---|---|---|---|---|---|
| 1 | Australia | Brett Martin, Rodney Eyles, Craig Rowland, Dan Jenson | 3 | 3 | 0 | 6 |
| 2 | Egypt | Amr Shabana, Amir Wagih, Omar El Borolossy | 3 | 2 | 1 | 4 |
| 3 | Finland | Juha Raumolin, Janne Kyttanen, Mika Monto, Ville Sistonen | 3 | 1 | 2 | 2 |
| 4 | Wales | Alex Gough, David Evans, Gareth Davies | 3 | 0 | 3 | 0 |

=== Pool C ===
| Team one | Team two | Score |
|---|---|---|
| South Africa | New Zealand | 3-0 |
| South Africa | France | 2-1 |
| South Africa | Spain | 3-0 |
| New Zealand | Spain | 2-1 |
| New Zealand | France | 2-1 |
| France | Spain | 3-0 |

| Pos | Nation | Team | P | W | L | Pts |
|---|---|---|---|---|---|---|
| 1 | South Africa | Craig Wapnick, Glenn Whittaker, Craig van der Wath, Mike Tootill | 3 | 3 | 0 | 6 |
| 2 | New Zealand | Glen Wilson, Wayne Werder, Paul Steel, Daniel Sharplin | 3 | 2 | 1 | 4 |
| 3 | France | | 3 | 1 | 2 | 2 |
| 4 | Spain | | 3 | 0 | 3 | 0 |

=== Pool D ===
| Team one | Team two | Score |
|---|---|---|
| Malaysia | Scotland | 2-1 |
| Malaysia | Sweden | 2-1 |
| Malaysia | Argentina | 3-0 |
| Sweden | Argentina | 3-0 |
| Sweden | Scotland | 2-1 |
| Scotland | Argentina | 2-1 |

| Pos | Nation | Team | P | W | L | Pts |
|---|---|---|---|---|---|---|
| 1 | Malaysia | Kenneth Low, Yap Kok Four, Ricky Lee | 3 | 3 | 0 | 6 |
| 2 | Sweden | Fredrik Johnson, Anders Thoren, Daniel Forslund | 3 | 2 | 1 | 4 |
| 3 | Scotland | Martin Heath, Alan Thomson, Stuart Cowie, Peter Nicol* | 3 | 1 | 2 | 2 |
| 4 | Argentina | Federico Usandizaga, Diego De Bella, Jorge Gutiérrez | 3 | 0 | 3 | 0 |

Nicol unable to compete*

=== Quarter-finals ===
| Team one | Team two | Score |
|---|---|---|
| Canada | Malaysia | 3-0 |
| Australia | South Africa | 3-0 |
| England | Finland | 3-0 |
| Egypt | Pakistan | 3-0 |

=== Semi-finals ===
| Team one | Team two | Score |
|---|---|---|
| England | Australia | 3-0 |
| Canada | Egypt | 2-1 |

=== Third Place Play Off ===
| Team one | Team two | Score |
|---|---|---|
| Australia | Egypt | 2-1 |

=== Final ===
England
3
FINAL
Kuala Lumpur, Malaysia
15 November 1997

Canada
0

| | | | 1 | 2 | 3 | 4 | 5 |
|---|---|---|---|---|---|---|---|
| 1 | (England) (Canada) | Simon Parke; Jonathon Power | 9; 1 | 9; 0 | 9; 0 |
| 2 | (England) (Canada) | Chris Walker; Gary Waite | 9; 1 | 9; 3 | 9; 4 |
| 3 | (England) (Canada) | Del Harris; Graham Ryding | 9; 1 | 9; 1 |

| Preceded by Egypt; 1995 | Squash World Team; Malaysia; 1997 | Succeeded by Egypt; 1999 |

== See also ==
- World Team Squash Championships
- World Squash Federation
- World Open (squash)
