= Paul Carter (squash player) =

English squash player (born 1963)

Personal information
- Born: 23 September 1963 (age 62) Chatham, Kent, England

Sport
- Country: England

Men's singles
Medal record
Men's squash
Representing England
European Team Championships
Gold medal – first place	1989 Helsinki	Team
Gold medal – first place	1990 Zurich	Team

Paul Carter (born 23 September 1963) is a former English professional squash player.

== Biography ==
Carter was born in Chatham, Kent and represented Hertfordshire at county level. He became National champion in 1988 and competed in the British Open Squash Championships throughout the nineties. He represented England at International level.

Carter won two gold medals for the England men's national squash team at the European Squash Team Championships in 1989 and 1990.
