= Scotland men's national squash team =

Scotland
- Coach: Paul Bell
- Association: Scottish Squash and Racketball
- Colors: Blue

World Team Championships
- First year: 1981
- Titles: 0
- Runners-up: 0
- Best finish: 4th
- Entries: 21

European Team Championships
- Titles: 1
- Runners-up: 7
- Best finish: 1st

The Scotland men's national squash team represents Scotland in international squash team competitions, and is governed by the Scottish Squash and Racketball.

Since 1981, Scotland has participated in one semi final of the World Squash Team Open, in 2001.

== Current team ==
- Alan Clyne
- Greg Lobban
- Angus Gillams (C)
- Rory Stewart
- Stuart George
- John Meehan (sub)
- Andrew Glen

== Results ==
=== World Team Squash Championships ===
Year	Result	Position	W	L
(Sweden) Stockholm 1981	Quarter Final	8th	3	4
(New Zealand) Auckland 1983	Group Stage	12th	2	7
(Egypt) Cairo 1985	Group Stage	12th	3	6
(England) London 1987	Group Stage	9th	6	2
Singapore 1989	Group Stage	15th	2	6
(Finland) Helsinki 1991	Group Stage	11th	4	2
(Pakistan) Karachi 1993	Group Stage	9th	4	2
(Egypt) Cairo 1995	Group Stage	16th	1	5
(Malaysia) Petaling Jaya 1997	Group Stage	15th	2	4
(Egypt) Cairo 1999	Group Stage	16th	1	5
(Australia) Melbourne 2001	Semi Final	4th	4	3
(Austria) Vienna 2003	Quarter Final	7th	5	2
(Pakistan) Islamabad 2005	Group Stage	14th	3	3
(India) Chennai 2007	Group Stage	18th	3	3
(Denmark) Odense 2009	Round of 16	13th	4	3
(Germany) Paderborn 2011	Group Stage	20th	4	3
(France) Mulhouse 2013	Round of 16	9th	5	2
(Egypt) Cairo 2015	Cancelled			
(France) Marseille 2017	Quarter Final	8th	2	4
(United States) Washington, D.C. 2019	Quarter Final	7th	4	2
(Malaysia) Kuala Lumpur 2021	Cancelled			
(New Zealand) Tauranga 2023	Quarter Final	7th	3	1
Hong Kong 2024	Second round	10th	1	2
Total	21/21	0 Title	66	71

=== European Squash Team Championships ===
Year	Result	Position
(Scotland) Edinburgh 1973	Final	2nd
(Sweden) Stockholm 1974	Final	2nd
(Republic of Ireland) Dublin 1975	Final	2nd
(Belgium) Brussels 1976	Final	2nd
(England) Sheffield 1977	Final	2nd
(Netherlands) Amsterdam 1978	Semi Final	3rd
(Germany) Hamburg 1979	Semi Final	3rd
(Finland) Helsinki 1980	Not in the Top 4	
(Netherlands) Amsterdam 1981	Semi Final	4th
(Wales) Cardiff 1982	Not in the Top 4	
(Germany) Munich 1983	Not in the Top 4	
(Republic of Ireland) Dublin 1984	Not in the Top 4	
(Spain) Barcelona 1985	Not in the Top 4	
(France) Aix-en-Provence 1986	Not in the Top 4	
(Austria) Vienna 1987	Not in the Top 4	
(Netherlands) Warmond 1988	Not in the Top 4	
(Finland) Helsinki 1989	Not in the Top 4	
(Switzerland) Zürich 1990	Not in the Top 4	
(Germany) Gelsenkirchen 1991	Not in the Top 4	
(France) Aix-en-Provence 1992	Champion	1st
(France) Aix-en-Provence 1993	Not in the Top 4	
(Germany) Zoetermeer 1994	Semi Final	3rd
(Netherlands) Amsterdam 1995	Not in the Top 4	
(Netherlands) Amsterdam 1996	Final	2nd
(Denmark) Odense 1997	Not in the Top 4	
(Finland) Helsinki 1998	Not in the Top 4	
(Austria) Linz 1999	Final	2nd
(Austria) Vienna 2000	Not in the Top 4	
(Netherlands) Eindhoven 2001	Not in the Top 4	
(Germany) Böblingen 2002	Not in the Top 4	
(England) Nottingham 2003	Not in the Top 4	
(France) Rennes 2004	Not in the Top 4	
(Netherlands) Amsterdam 2005	Not in the Top 4	
(Austria) Vienna 2006	Not in the Top 4	
(Italy) Riccione 2007	Not in the Top 4	
(Netherlands) Amsterdam 2008	Not in the Top 4	
(Sweden) Malmö 2009	Not in the Top 4	
(France) Aix-en-Provence 2010	Not in the Top 4	
(Finland) Espoo 2011	Not in the Top 4	
(Germany) Nuremberg 2012	Semi Final	4th
(Netherlands) Amsterdam 2013	Semi Final	4th
(Italy) Riccione 2014	Semi Final	4th
(Denmark) Herning 2015	Semi Final	4th
(Poland) Warsaw 2016	Semi Final	3rd
(Finland) Helsinki 2017	Semi Final	4th
(Poland) Wrocław 2018	Not in the Top 4	
(England) Birmingham 2019	Semi Final	3rd
(Netherlands) Eindhoven 2022	Semi Final	3rd
(Finland) Helsinki 2023	Not in the Top 4	
(Switzerland) Uster 2024	Did not enter	
(Poland) Wrocław 2025	Quarter Final	Not in the Top 4
Total	x1 - x7 - x4	

== See also ==
- Scottish Squash and Racketball
- World Team Squash Championships
- Scotland women's national squash team
- Scottish National Squash Championships
