= Martin Bodimeade =

English squash player

Personal information
- Born: 21 October 1963 (age 62) Fulham, London, England

Sport
- Country: England

Men's singles
- Highest ranking: No. 15 (February 1987)
Medal record
Men's squash
Representing England
European Team Championships
Gold medal – first place	1984 Dublin	Team
Gold medal – first place	1985 Barcelona	Team
Gold medal – first place	1986 Aix-en-Provence	Team
Gold medal – first place	1987 Vienna	Team
Gold medal – first place	1988 Warmond	Team

Martin Bodimeade (born 21 October 1963) is an English former professional squash player. He reached a career-high world ranking of 15 in February 1987.

== Biography ==
Bodimeade born in London, progressed through the county age groups winning the Berkshire U14, U16 and U19 titles between 1975 and 1980. He represented the county at full senior level and reached the top six of the UK rankings and number 30 in the world at the age of 19.

Bodimeade won five gold medals for the England men's national squash team at the European Squash Team Championships from 1985 to 1988.
