= Bryan Beeson =

English squash player (born 1960)

Personal information
- Born: 26 July 1960 (age 66) Gateshead, Northumberland, England

Sport
- Country: England

Men's singles
- Highest ranking: No. 11 (July 1990)
Medal record
Men's squash
Representing England
European Team Championships
Gold medal – first place	1985 Barcelona	Team
Gold medal – first place	1986 Aix-en-Provence	Team
Gold medal – first place	1987 Vienna	Team
Gold medal – first place	1988 Warmond	Team
Gold medal – first place	1989 Helsinki	Team
Gold medal – first place	1990 Zurich	Team

Bryan Beeson (born 26 July 1960) is a former English professional squash player.

== Biography ==
Beeson was born in Gateshead, Northumberlandand became county junior champion in 1977 & 1978.

He represented England in the 1987 Men's World Team Squash Championships and 1989 Men's World Team Squash Championships and won six consecutive gold medals for the England men's national squash team at the European Squash Team Championships from 1985 to 1990.

He has a remarkable record at senior level winning the Northumberland Senior title fourteen times from 1980-1996.

Beeson was the British national champion in 1986.
