= Phil Whitlock (squash player) =

English squash player

Personal information
- Born: 28 February 1962 (age 64) Belfast, Northern Ireland

Sport
- Country: Northern Ireland; England

Men's singles
- Highest ranking: No. 8 (December 1993)
Medal record
Men's squash
Representing England
European Team Championships
Gold medal – first place	1988 Warmond	Team
Gold medal – first place	1993 Aix-en-Provence	Team
Gold medal – first place	1994 Zoetermeer	Team

Philip Whitlock (born 28 February 1962) is a former British professional squash player. He reached a career-high world ranking of 8 at the end of 1993.

== Biography ==
Whitlock was born in Belfast and represented Devon at county level. He reached a world ranking of 8 and competed in the British Open Squash Championships throughout the nineties. He also represented England at international level including being part of the team at the 1993 Men's World Team Squash Championships.

Whitlock won three gold medals for the England men's national squash team at the European Squash Team Championships in 1988, 1993 and 1994.

He is the current squash coach of professional squash player Emily Whitlock, his daughter.
