= Stuart Hailstone =

South African squash player (1962–2020)

Personal information
- Born: 12 April 1962 Cape Town, South Africa
- Died: 26 August 2020 (aged 58)

Sport
- Country: South Africa
- Handedness: Right Handed

Men's singles

Stuart Hailstone (12 April 1962 – 26 August 2020) was a South African squash player, representing South Africa and Scotland. He reached 14th place in the world in 1987, his best career ranking. Between 1986 and 1991, he was thrice the national champion of South Africa and twice the runner-up.

== Biography ==
Born in South Africa, Hailstone grew up in Zimbabwe and lived in England during his professional career. At the end of the Apartheid boycott, he represented South Africa at the 1993 WSF World Team Squash Championships.

While recovering from sepsis, Stuart Hailstone died of a stroke on 26 August 2020 at the age of 58.

== Awards ==
=== Titles ===
- South African Squash Championship (1986, 1989, 1991)

=== Finals ===
- South African Squash Finalist (1988, 1992)
