= Paul Gregory (squash player) =

English squash player

Personal information
- Born: 2 July 1968 (age 58) London, England

Sport
- Country: British (English)

Men's singles
- Highest ranking: No. 11 (May 1996)
Medal record
Men's squash
Representing England
European Team Championships
Gold medal – first place	1989 Helsinki	Team
Bronze medal – third place	1992 Aix-en-Provence	Team

Paul Gregory (born 2 July 1968) is an English former professional squash player who also represented the Greek national team.

== Biography ==
Paul was born in London and represented Surrey at county level and competed in the British Open Squash Championships throughout the 1990s.

Gregory won a gold medal for the England men's national squash team on his debut, at the European Squash Team Championships in 1989.

He was National champion in 1991 but later switched allegiance and represented Greece from 1997.
