= Jason Nicolle =

English squash player (born 1965)

Personal information
- Born: 4 November 1965 (age 60) London, England

Sport
- Country: England

Men's singles
- Highest ranking: No. 15 (July 1994)
Medal record
Men's squash
Representing England
European Team Championships
Gold medal – first place	1988 Warmond	Team
Gold medal – first place	1991 Gelsenkirchen	Team
Bronze medal – third place	1992 Aix-en-Provence	Team
Gold medal – first place	1994 Zoetermeer	Team

Jason Nicolle (born 4 November 1965) is a former English professional squash player.

== Biography ==
Nicolle was born in London and represented Hampshire at county level. He was part of the English team that competed at the 1989 Men's World Team Squash Championships and 1991 Men's World Team Squash Championships.

Nicolle won three gold medals for the England men's national squash team at the European Squash Team Championships in 1988, 1991 and 1994.
