= Del Harris (squash player) =

English squash player (born 1969)

Personal information
- Born: 13 July 1969 (age 57) Colchester, Essex, England

Sport
- Country: England
- Highest ranking: 5 (March 1996)
Medal record
Men's squash
Representing England
World Championships
Silver medal – second place	1995 Nicosia	singles
European Team Championships
Gold medal – first place	1989 Helsinki	Team
Gold medal – first place	1990 Zurich	Team
Gold medal – first place	1991 Gelsenkirchen	Team
Bronze medal – third place	1992 Aix-en-Provence	Team
Gold medal – first place	1995 Amsterdam	Team
Gold medal – first place	1998 Helsinki	Team
Gold medal – first place	2000 Vienna	Team
Gold medal – first place	2002 Böblingen	Team

Del Trevor Harris (born 13 July 1969) is a former professional squash player from England.

== Biography ==
Harris won the World Junior Squash Championships title in 1988, and went on to become one of the leading players in the men's professional game in the 1990s. He represented England in the 1989 Men's World Team Squash Championships and 1991 Men's World Team Squash Championships.

In 1995, Harris reached the final of the 1995 Men's World Open Squash Championship, where he lost to the legendary Pakistani player Jansher Khan 15–10, 17–14, 16–17, 15–8. That year Harris was also part of the winning England team in the 1995 Men's World Team Squash Championships and in addition he won the Super Series Finals event, beating Brett Martin of Australia in the final 10–8, 7–9, 9–4, 6–9, 9–2. Further success came in 1997 when he was once again part of the winning England team in the 1997 Men's World Team Squash Championships.

Harris won the British National Squash Championships twice, in 1987 and 1989 and reached his career-high world ranking of World No. 5 in March 1996.

Harris won seven gold medals for the England men's national squash team at the European Squash Team Championships in 1989, 1990, 1991, 1995, 1998, 2000 and 2002.
