= Peter Marshall (squash player) =

English squash player

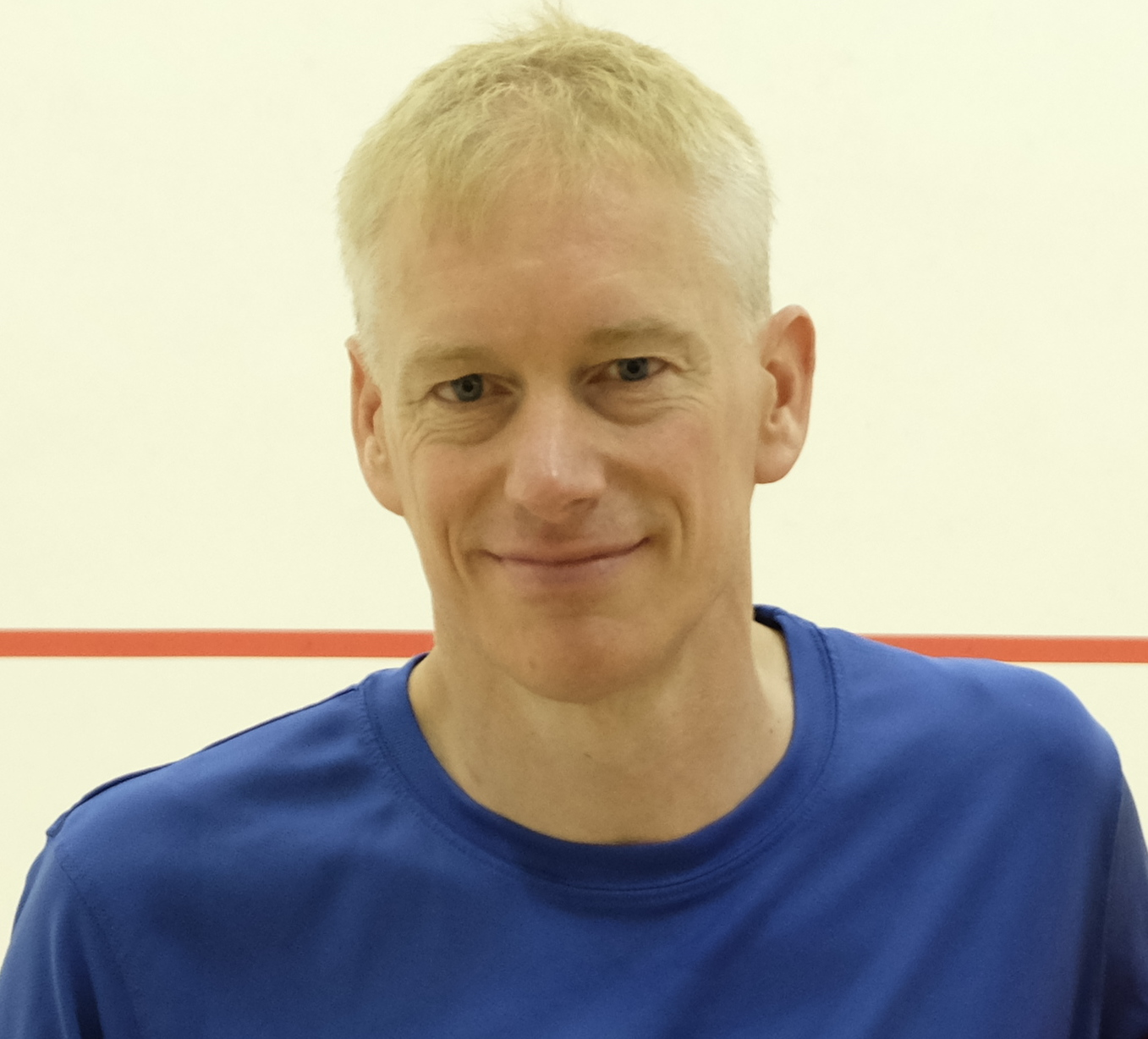

Personal information
- Born: 12 May 1971 (age 55) Nottingham, England

Sport
- Country: England
- Highest ranking: 2 (November 1994)
Medal record
Men's squash
Representing England
World Championships
Silver medal – second place	1994 Barcelona	Singles
Bronze medal – third place	1993 Karachi	Singles
Bronze medal – third place	1997 Petaling Jaya	Singles
World Team Squash Championships
Gold medal – first place	1997 Petaling Jaya	Team
European Team Championships
Gold medal – first place	1990 Zurich	Team
Gold medal – first place	1991 Gelsenkirchen	Team
Bronze medal – third place	1992 Aix-en-Provence	Team
Gold medal – first place	2000 Vienna	Team

Peter Marshall (born 12 May 1971) is a former professional squash player from England. He is notable for his unique double-handed playing style.

== Biography ==
=== Early career and junior success ===
Marshall demonstrated exceptional talent from a young age, winning British junior titles across all age groups: under-12, under-14, under-16, and under-19. He won the British Open U19 tournament in 1989 and the World Masters U23 Championship in 1990. He was coached and mentored by six-time British champion Jonah Barrington.

=== Professional career and rise to World No. 2 ===
Marshall was renowned for his unique double-handed playing style, a technique he developed in childhood due to his smaller stature and the weight of racquets at the time. Despite advice from many coaches to switch to a single-handed style, he persisted with his two-handed approach. His flexibility allowed him to use both one and two hands effectively on his forehand, giving him exceptional reach. He was known for his disciplined, patient, and well-organized game, possessing exceptional length and a deceptive double-handed backhand. He employed a steep downward swing, aiming for the ball to "die" in the back corners, and was adept at playing deceptive angles.

Marshall first attained the England No. 1 ranking in November 1991, holding the position unchallenged for four years. He also held the No. 1 ranking in both Britain and Europe for several years.

The 1994-95 season was a highlight of Marshall's career. He reached the final of five PSA Super Series events and reached a career-high World Ranking of No. 2 in November 1994, behind Jansher Khan. Many observers believed he would challenge Jansher Khan for the World No. 1 spot.

He finished runner-up to Jansher Khan at the World Open in 1994 and the British Open in 1995. He also secured notable victories against reigning World Open champion Rodney Martin and a historic win against Jahangir Khan at the World Open in Johannesburg, becoming the first British player in 11 years to defeat him.

Marshall won the British National Championship in 1992 and 1994 and won gold medals for the England men's national squash team at the European Squash Team Championships in 1990 and 1991.

=== Battle with illness ===
In 1995, at the peak of his career, Marshall was afflicted with glandular fever, which sidelined him from top-level competition for two years. He was later diagnosed with chronic fatigue syndrome (ME/CFS), which continued to impact his career.

Despite the significant setback, Marshall displayed remarkable resilience. He returned to the professional tour in 1997, reclaiming his place in the England squad and contributing to their victory at the World Team Squash Championships in Malaysia. He broke back into the world's top-10 in 1999 and won his third British National Championship title in February 2000 and a third European Squash Team Championships in 2000.

After his peak professional career, Marshall continued his involvement in the sport. He won the Over-35 British National Championship in 2008 and the British Open Masters Over-40 title in 2016 and 2018. He most recently won the Over-40 British National Championship in February 2024.

=== Post-retirement activities and advocacy ===
Marshall released his autobiography, Shattered: A Champion's Fight Against a Mystery Illness, in 2001, detailing his struggles with chronic fatigue syndrome.

He holds a BSc in Physiotherapy from the University of Nottingham and an Executive MBA from Imperial College London. He later worked for Ernst & Young.

Marshall is actively involved in the squash community and served as an Ambassador for Access Sport. He is currently a trustee for the England Squash Foundation. He is also a founding member of Independent Squash Minds. He received a Lifetime Achievement Award from the Professional Squash Association in 2015. In 2023, he was inducted into the Hall of Fame at the University of Nottingham.

== Major Tournament Results ==
Peter Marshall's Major Tournament Results
Tournament	Year	Result	Opponent
World Open	1994	Runner-up	Jansher Khan
British Open	1995	Runner-up	Jansher Khan
British National Championship	1992	Winner	Bryan Beeson
British National Championship	1994	Winner	Peter Nicol
British National Championship	2000	Winner	David Evans
World Team Squash Championships	1997	Winner	(England Team)
British Open U19	1989	Winner	
World Masters U23 Championship	1990	Winner	

== British National Championship Record (Post-Peak) ==
Peter Marshall's British National Championship Record (Post-Peak)
Year	Category	Result	Opponent	Score
2008	Over-35	Winner	--	--
2016	Over-40 Masters	Winner	--	
2018	Over-40 Masters	Winner	--	--
2024	Over-40	Winner	Phil Rushworth	11/4, 11/7, 11/4
