= Finland men's national squash team =

Finland
- Coach: Mika Monto
- Association: Finnish Squash Association
- Colors: Blue & White

World Team Championships
- First year: 1981
- Titles: 0
- Runners-up: 0
- Best finish: 3rd
- Entries: 18

European Team Championships
- Titles: 0
- Runners-up: 4
- Best finish: 2nd

The Finland men's national squash team represents Finland in international squash team competitions, and is governed by the Finnish Squash Association.

Since 1981, Finland has won one Bronze medal of the World Squash Team Open, in 1991.

== Current team ==
- Olli Tuominen
- Henrik Mustonen
- Matias Tuomi
- Jaakko Vahamaa
- Miko Äijänen

== Results ==
=== World Team Squash Championships ===
Year	Result	Position	W	L
(Australia) Melbourne 1967	Did not present			
(England) Birmingham 1969	Did not present			
(New Zealand) Palmerston North 1971	Did not present			
(South Africa) Johannesburg 1973	Did not present			
(England) Birmingham 1976	Did not present			
(Canada) Toronto 1977	Did not present			
(Australia) Brisbane 1979	Did not present			
(Sweden) Stockholm 1981	Group Stage	10th	5	3
(New Zealand) Auckland 1983	Group Stage	13th	5	4
(Egypt) Cairo 1985	Group Stage	10th	5	4
(England) London 1987	Group Stage	11th	5	3
Singapore 1989	Quarter Final	6th	4	4
(Finland) Helsinki 1991	Semi Final	3rd	3	2
(Pakistan) Karachi 1993	Semi Final	4th	2	3
(Egypt) Cairo 1995	Quarter Final	8th	1	5
(Malaysia) Petaling Jaya 1997	Quarter Final	7th	2	4
(Egypt) Cairo 1999	Quarter Final	5th	3	3
(Australia) Melbourne 2001	Round of 16	12th	3	4
(Austria) Vienna 2003	Group Stage	25th	4	3
(Pakistan) Islamabad 2005	Group Stage	18th	2	3
(India) Chennai 2007	Group Stage	21st	3	3
(Denmark) Odense 2009	Group Stage	19th	2	3
(Germany) Paderborn 2011	Round of 16	11th	3	4
(France) Mulhouse 2013	Round of 16	14th	3	4
(Egypt) Cairo 2015	Cancelled			
(France) Marseille 2017	Round of 16	15th	2	4
(United States) Washington, D.C. 2019	Did not present			
Total	18/26	0 Title	57	63

=== European Squash Team Championships ===
Year	Result	Position
(Scotland) Edinburgh 1973	Not in the Top 4	
(Sweden) Stockholm 1974	Not in the Top 4	
(Republic of Ireland) Dublin 1975	Not in the Top 4	
(Belgium) Brussels 1976	Not in the Top 4	
(England) Sheffield 1977	Not in the Top 4	
(Netherlands) Amsterdam 1978	Semi Final	4th
(Germany) Hamburg 1979	Not in the Top 4	
(Finland) Helsinki 1980	Semi Final	3rd
(Netherlands) Amsterdam 1981	Not in the Top 4	
(Wales) Cardiff 1982	Semi Final	4th
(Germany) Munich 1983	Not in the Top 4	
(Republic of Ireland) Dublin 1984	Semi Final	3rd
(Spain) Barcelona 1985	Semi Final	3rd
(France) Aix-en-Provence 1986	Semi Final	3rd
(Austria) Vienna 1987	Semi Final	3rd
(Netherlands) Warmond 1988	Semi Final	3rd
(Finland) Helsinki 1989	Semi Final	3rd
(Switzerland) Zürich 1990	Semi Final	3rd
(Germany) Gelsenkirchen 1991	Final	2nd
(France) Aix-en-Provence 1992	Final	2nd
(France) Aix-en-Provence 1993	Not in the Top 4	
(Germany) Zoetermeer 1994	Not in the Top 4	
(Netherlands) Amsterdam 1995	Final	2nd
(Netherlands) Amsterdam 1996	Semi Final	3rd
(Denmark) Odense 1997	Semi Final	3rd
(Finland) Helsinki 1998	Final	2nd
(Austria) Linz 1999	Semi Final	4th
(Austria) Vienna 2000	Semi Final	3rd
(Netherlands) Eindhoven 2001	Semi Final	3rd
(Germany) Böblingen 2002	Not in the Top 4	
(England) Nottingham 2003	Not in the Top 4	
(France) Rennes 2004	Not in the Top 4	
(Netherlands) Amsterdam 2005	Not in the Top 4	
(Austria) Vienna 2006	Not in the Top 4	
(Italy) Riccione 2007	Not in the Top 4	
(Netherlands) Amsterdam 2008	Not in the Top 4	
(Sweden) Malmö 2009	Not in the Top 4	
(France) Aix-en-Provence 2010	Not in the Top 4	
(Finland) Espoo 2011	Not in the Top 4	
(Germany) Nuremberg 2012	Not in the Top 4	
(Netherlands) Amsterdam 2013	Not in the Top 4	
(Italy) Riccione 2014	Not in the Top 4	
(Denmark) Herning 2015	Not in the Top 4	
(Poland) Warsaw 2016	Not in the Top 4	
(Finland) Helsinki 2017	Not in the Top 4	
(Poland) Wrocław 2018	Not in the Top 4	
(England) Birmingham 2019	Not in the Top 4	
Total	x4 - x12	

== See also ==
- Finnish Squash Association
- World Team Squash Championships
