= Scotland women's national squash team =

Scotland
- Coach: Roger Flynn
- Association: Scottish Squash and Racketball
- Colors: Blue

World Team Championships
- First year: 1981
- Best finish: 4th
- Entries: 14

The Scotland women's national squash team represents Scotland in international squash team competitions, and is governed by Scottish Squash and Racketball.

Since 1981, Scotland has finished in one fourth place of the World Squash Team Open, in 1981.

== Current team ==
- Frania Gillen-Buchert
- Alex Clark
- Rosie Allen
- Robyn McAlpine

== Results ==
=== World Team Squash Championships ===
Year	Result	Position	W	L
(Canada) Toronto 1981	Group Stage	4th	4	2
(Australia) Perth 1983	Group Stage	5th	2	3
(Republic of Ireland) Dublin 1985	Group Stage	6th	3	5
(New Zealand) Auckland 1987	Group Stage	6th	5	3
(Netherlands) Warmond 1989	Quarter Final	6th	2	4
(Australia) Sydney 1990	Group Stage	11th	0	5
(Canada) Vancouver 1992	Quarter Final	8th	3	3
(England) Guernsey 1994	Group Stage	7th	2	4
(Malaysia) Petaling Jaya 1996	Quarter Final	7th	4	2
(Germany) Stuttgart 1998	Group Stage	12th	4	3
(England) Sheffield 2000	Round of 16	9th	5	2
(Denmark) Odense 2002	Quarter Final	6th	4	3
(Netherlands) Amsterdam 2004	Group Stage	14th	2	5
(Canada) Edmonton 2006	Did not present			
(Egypt) Cairo 2008	Did not present			
(New Zealand) Palmerston North 2010	Did not present			
(France) Nîmes 2012	Group Stage	21st	2	4
(Canada) Niagara-on-the-Lake 2014	Did not present			
Total	14/18	0 Title	42	48

== See also ==
- Scottish Squash and Racketball
- World Team Squash Championships
- Scotland men's national squash team
- Scottish National Squash Championships
