= 2008 European Squash Team Championships =

Squash tournament

- 36th
- Location: (Netherlands) Amsterdam
- Date: 30 April – 3 May 2008
- Website europeansquash.com

Results
- Champions: Men England; Women England

The 2008 European Squash Team Championships was the 36th edition of European Squash Team Championships for squash players. The event was held in Amsterdam, Netherlands, from 30 April to 3 May 2008. The tournament was organised by the European Squash Federation.

The England men's team won their 33rd title and the England women's team won their 31st title.

== Men's tournament ==
=== Group stage ===
Group A

Pos	Team	P	W	D	L	Pts
1	England	3	3	0	0	6
2	Scotland	3	2	0	1	4
3	Denmark	3	0	1	2	1
4	Belgium	3	0	1	2	1

Group B

Pos	Team	P	W	D	L	Pts
1	Netherlands	3	3	0	0	6
2	Switzerland	3	1	1	1	3
3	Sweden	3	1	1	1	3
4	Hungary	3	0	0	3	0

Group C

Pos	Team	P	W	L	Pts
1	France	3	3	0	6
2	Spain	3	2	1	4
3	(Republic of Ireland) Ireland	3	1	2	2
4	Austria	3	0	3	0

Group D

Pos	Team	P	W	D	L	Pts
1	Germany	3	2	1	0	5
2	Wales	3	2	1	0	5
3	Finland	3	0	1	2	1
4	Italy	3	0	1	2	1

=== Semi-finals ===
England
4
Semi-final 1

Germany
0

			1	2	3	4	5
1	(England) (Germany)	James Willstrop; Simon Rösner	3; 9	9; 1	9; 3	9; 5
2	(England) (Germany)	Adrian Grant; Patrick Gaessler	9; 0	9; 2	9; 0
3	(England) (Germany)	Lee Beachill; Tim Weber	9; 0	9; 0	9; 1
4	(England) (Germany)	Joey Barrington; Moritz Dahmen	9; 0	9; 3	9; 3

France
4
Semi-final 2

Netherlands
0

			1	2	3	4	5
1	(France) (Netherlands)	Grégory Gaultier; Laurens Jan Anjema	4; 9	9; 3	9; 3	7; 9	9; 5
2	(France) (Netherlands)	Renan Lavigne; Tom Hoevenaars	9; 1	9; 4	9; 4
3	(France) (Netherlands)	Thierry Lincou; Dylan Bennett	9; 4	9; 0	9; 0
4	(France) (Netherlands)	Julien Balbo; Lucas Buit	9; 7	9; 1

=== Third place ===
Netherlands
3
Third place

Germany
1

			1	2	3	4	5
1	(Netherlands) (Germany)	Laurens Jan Anjema; Simon Rösner	9; 1	9; 6	9; 4
2	(Netherlands) (Germany)	Piedro Schweertman; Patrick Gaessler	5; 9	9; 2	3; 9	9; 8	5; 9
3	(Netherlands) (Germany)	Dylan Bennett; Tim Weber	9; 4	9; 5	7; 9	9; 1
4	(Netherlands) (Germany)	Tom Hoevenaars; Stefan Leifels	9; 1	9; 1	9; 1

=== Final ===
England
3
Final

France
0

			1	2	3	4	5
1	(England) (France)	Peter Barker; Thierry Lincou	8; 10	9; 7	9; 1	10; 8
2	(England) (France)	James Willstrop; Grégory Gaultier	9; 7	2; 9	7; 9	9; 1	9; 3
3	(England) (France)	Adrian Grant; Julien Balbo	9; 1	9; 2	9; 6
4	(England) (France)	Lee Beachill; Renan Lavigne						not played

== Women's tournament ==
=== Group stage ===
Group A

Pos	Team	P	W	L	Pts
1	England	3	3	0	6
2	(Republic of Ireland) Ireland	3	2	1	4
3	Germany	3	1	2	2
4	Spain	3	0	3	0

Group B

Pos	Team	P	W	L	Pts
1	Netherlands	3	3	0	6
2	France	3	2	1	4
3	Denmark	3	1	2	2
4	Switzerland	3	0	3	0

=== Semi-finals ===
England
3
Semi-final 1

France
0

			1	2	3	4	5
1	(England) (France)	Laura Massaro; Coline Aumard	9; 0	9; 0	9; 4
2	(England) (France)	Vicky Botwright; Isabelle Stoehr	9; 3	9; 7	9; 6
3	(England) (France)	Alison Waters; Camille Serme	7; 9	9; 0	9; 2	9; 4

Netherlands
3
Semi-final 2

Ireland
0

			1	2	3	4	5
1	(Netherlands) (Republic of Ireland)	Karen Kronemeyer; Laura Mylotte	9; 0	9; 2	9; 4
2	(Netherlands) (Republic of Ireland)	Vanessa Atkinson; Madeline Perry	9; 2	10; 9	9; 3
3	(Netherlands) (Republic of Ireland)	Annelize Naudé; Aisling Blake	2; 9	9; 5	9; 5

=== Third place ===
France
2
Third place

Ireland
1

			1	2	3	4	5
1	(France) (Republic of Ireland)	Maud Duplomb; Laura Mylotte	7; 9	10; 8	3; 9	2; 9
2	(France) (Republic of Ireland)	Isabelle Stoehr; Madeline Perry	9; 4	9; 2	0; 9	3; 9	10; 8
3	(France) (Republic of Ireland)	Camille Serme; Aisling Blake	9; 2	9; 7	9; 4

=== Final ===
England
3
Final

Netherlands
0

			1	2	3	4	5
1	(England) (Netherlands)	Alison Waters; Karen Kronemeyer	9; 0	9; 5	9; 0
2	(England) (Netherlands)	Vicky Botwright; Vanessa Atkinson	9; 1	10; 8	9; 3
3	(England) (Netherlands)	Jenny Duncalf; Annelize Naudé	9; 4	9; 1
