= 2011 European Squash Team Championships =

Squash tournament

- 39th
- Location: (Finland) Espoo
- Date: 27 – 30 April 2011
- Website europeansquash.com

Results
- Champions: Men England; Women England

The 2011 European Squash Team Championships was the 39th edition of European Squash Team Championships for squash players. The event was held in Espoo, Finland, from 27 to 30 April 2011. The tournament was organised by the European Squash Federation.

The England men's team won their 36th title and the England women's team won their 33rd title.

== Men's tournament ==
=== Group stage ===
Group A

Pos	Team	P	W	D	L	Pts
1	England	3	3	0	0	6
2	Italy	3	2	0	1	4
3	Wales	3	1	0	2	2
4	(Czech Republic) Czech Rpublic	3	0	0	3	0

Group B

Pos	Team	P	W	D	L	Pts
1	France	3	3	0	0	6
2	Netherlands	3	1	1	1	3
3	Germany	3	1	0	2	2
4	Scotland	3	0	1	2	1

=== Semi-finals ===
England
4
Semi-final 1

Netherlands
0

			1	2	3	4	5
1	(England) (Netherlands)	James Willstrop; Piëdro Schweertman	11; 2	11; 5	11; 6
2	(England) (Netherlands)	Nick Matthew; Dylan Bennett	11; 7	9; 11	11; 2	11; 5
3	(England) (Netherlands)	Daryl Selby; Rene Mijs	11; 3	11; 6	12; 10
4	(England) (Netherlands)	Peter Barker; Sebastiaan Weenink	12; 10	11; 8

France
4
Semi-final 2

Italy
0

			1	2	3	4	5
1	(France) (Italy)	Mathieu Castagnet; Davide Bianchetti	11; 8	6; 11	7; 11	11; 4	11; 7
2	(France) (Italy)	Grégory Gaultier; Stéphane Galifi	11; 9	11; 3	11; 4
3	(France) (Italy)	Yann Perrin; Amr Swelim	9; 11	11; 9	11; 2	11; 7
4	(France) (Italy)	Grégoire Marche; Marcus Berrett	11; 3	11; 8

=== Third place ===
Italy
3
Third place

Netherlands
1

			1	2	3	4	5
1	(Italy) (Netherlands)	Stéphane Galifi; Laurens Jan Anjema	5; 11	4; 11	9; 11
2	(Italy) (Netherlands)	Marcus Berrett; Piëdro Schweertman	11; 4	9; 11	11; 1	11; 2
3	(Italy) (Netherlands)	Amr Swelim; Sebastiaan Weenink	11; 6	11; 6	11; 8
4	(Italy) (Netherlands)	Davide Bianchetti; Dylan Bennett	11; 5	11; 5	11; 5

=== Final ===
England
3
Final

France
0

			1	2	3	4	5
1	(England) (France)	Jonathan Kemp; Julien Balbo	11; 6	11; 1	11; 3
2	(England) (France)	Nick Matthew; Grégory Gaultier	11; 8	12; 10	11; 5
3	(England) (France)	Peter Barker; Mathieu Castagnet	11; 5
4	(England) (France)	Daryl Selby; Grégoire Marche						not played

== Women's tournament ==
=== Group stage ===
Group A

Pos	Team	P	W	L	Pts
1	Netherlands	3	3	0	6
2	(Republic of Ireland) Ireland	3	2	1	4
3	Germany	3	1	2	2
4	Spain	3	0	3	0

Group B

Pos	Team	P	W	L	Pts
1	England	3	3	0	6
2	France	3	2	1	4
3	Scotland	3	1	2	2
4	Italy	3	0	3	0

=== Semi-finals ===
Netherlands
2
Semi-final 1

France
1

			1	2	3	4	5
1	(Netherlands) (France)	Vanessa Atkinson; Camille Serme	6; 11	10; 12	7; 11
2	(Netherlands) (France)	Natalie Grinham; Isabelle Stoehr	11; 9	11; 7	11; 8
3	(Netherlands) (France)	Orla Noom; Coline Aumard	9; 11	3; 11	11; 3	11; 8	11; 8

England
3
Semi-final 2

Ireland
0

			1	2	3	4	5
1	(England) (Republic of Ireland)	Jennifer Duncalf; Madeline Perry	11; 5	11; 0	13; 11
2	(England) (Republic of Ireland)	Sarah Kippax; Aisling Blake	11; 13	11; 5	6; 11	13; 11	11; 9
3	(England) (Republic of Ireland)	Dominique Lloyd-Walter; Clare O'Brien	11; 2	11; 2

=== Third place ===
Ireland
2
Third place

France
0

			1	2	3	4	5
1	(Republic of Ireland) (France)	Aisling Blake; Isabelle Stoehr	11; 6	11; 3	9; 11	11; 8
2	(Republic of Ireland) (France)	Madeline Perry; Camille Serme	2; 11	3; 11	11; 6	11; 7	11; 9
3	(Republic of Ireland) (France)	Claire Staunton; Coline Aumard						not played

=== Final ===
England
3
Final

Netherlands
0

			1	2	3	4	5
1	(England) (Netherlands)	Sarah Kippax; Natalie Grinham	9; 11	9; 11	11; 2	11; 5	9; 11
2	(England) (Netherlands)	Jenny Duncalf; Vanessa Atkinson	11; 6	11; 2	11; 4
3	(England) (Netherlands)	Dominique Lloyd-Walter; Orla Noom	11; 5	11; 5
