= 1993 European Squash Team Championships =

Squash tournament

- 22nd
- Location: (France) Aix-en-Provence
- Venue: Set Squash Centre
- Date: 28 April – 1 May 1993
- Website europeansquash.com

Results
- Champions: Men England; Women England

The 1993 European Squash Team Championships was the 21st edition of European Squash Team Championships for squash players. The event was held at the Set Squash Centre in Aix-en-Provence, France, from 28 April to 1 May 1993. The tournament was organised by the European Squash Rackets Federation (ESRF).

The England men's team won their 18th title and the England women's team won their 16th title.

== Men's tournament ==
=== Group stage ===
Pool A

Pos	Team	P	W	D	L	Pts
1	England	3	3	0	0	6
2	France	3	1	1	1	3
3	Finland	3	1	1	1	3
4	Netherlands	3	0	0	3	0

Pool B

Pos	Team	P	W	L	Pts
1	Germany	3	3	0	6
2	Sweden	3	2	1	4
3	Scotland	3	1	2	2
4	(Republic of Ireland) Ireland	3	0	3	0

=== Semi finals ===
England
4
Semi-final 1

Sweden
0

			1	2	3	4	5
1	(England) (Sweden)	Chris Walker; Fredrik Johnson	9; 3	9; 1	10; 8
2	(England) (Sweden)	Phil Whitlock; Fredrik Almqvist	9; 8	9; 4	9; 0
3	(England) (Sweden)	Simon Parke; Daniel Forslund	9; 2	9; 1	9; 6
4	(England) (Sweden)	Tony Hands; Anders Thoren	9; 2	9; 2	9; 0

Germany
3
Semi-final 2

France
1

			1	2	3	4	5
1	(Germany) (France)	Johann Wiens; Julien Bonetat
2	(Germany) (France)	Simon Frenz; Nicolas Arnoux
3	(Germany) (France)	Oliver Rucks; Alexandre Denis
4	(Germany) (France)	Florian Pössl; John Elstob

=== Third place ===
France
2
Third place

Sweden
2

		1	2	3	4	5
1	(France) (Sweden)	9	9	9
2	(France) (Sweden)	9	9	9
3	(France) (Sweden)	9	9	9
4	(France) (Sweden)	9	9	9
5	(France) (Sweden)

=== Final ===
England
4
Final

Germany
0

			1	2	3	4	5
1	(England) (Germany)	Chris Walker; Johann Wiens	8; 10	6; 9	9; 7	9; 3	9; 2
2	(England) (Germany)	Phil Whitlock; Simon Frenz	9; 1	9; 1	6; 9	9; 4
3	(England) (Germany)	Simon Parke; Oliver Rucks	10; 9	9; 4	9; 6
4	(England) (Germany)	Tony Hands; Florian Pössl	9; 0	6; 9	9; 0	9; 5

== Women's tournament ==
=== Group stage ===
Pool A

Pos	Team	P	W	L	Pts
1	England	3	3	0	6
2	(Republic of Ireland) Ireland	3	2	1	4
3	Scotland	3	1	2	2
4	France	3	0	3	0

Pool B

Pos	Team	P	W	L	Pts
1	Netherlands	3	3	0	6
2	Germany	3	2	1	4
3	Sweden	3	1	2	2
4	Wales	3	0	3	0

=== Semi-finals ===
England
3
Semi-final 1

Germany
0

			1	2	3	4	5
1	(England) (Germany)	Cassie Jackman; Sabine Schöne	2; 9	9; 3	10; 8	9; 3
2	(England) (Germany)	Suzanne Horner; Sabine Baum	9; 3	9; 3	9; 0
3	(England) (Germany)	Sue Wright; Silke Bartel	9; 6	9; 4	9; 1

Netherlands
3
Semi-final 2

Ireland
0

			1	2	3	4	5
1	(Netherlands) (Republic of Ireland)	Hugoline van Hoorn; Rebecca O'Callaghan	4; 9	9; 7	2; 9	9; 5	9; 3
2	(Netherlands) (Republic of Ireland)	Denise Sommers; Aisling McArdle	9; 0	9; 2	9; 0
3	(Netherlands) (Republic of Ireland)	Marjolein Houtsma; Marjorie Croke	9; 4	9; 2	9; 2

=== Third place ===
Germany
3
Third place

Ireland
0

			1	2	3	4	5
1	(Germany) (Republic of Ireland)	Sabine Schöne; Rebecca O'Callaghan	10; 9	9; 4	9; 7
2	(Germany) (Republic of Ireland)	Silke Bartel; Marjorie Croke	5; 9	9; 5	9; 0	8; 9	9; 4
3	(Germany) (Republic of Ireland)	Sabine Baum; Aisling McArdle	9; 3	9; 1	9; 0

=== Final ===
England
3
Final

Netherlands
0

			1	2	3	4	5
1	(England) (Netherlands)	Cassie Jackman; Hugoline van Hoorn	9; 3	9; 2	9; 0
2	(England) (Netherlands)	Suzanne Horner; Denise Sommers	9; 7	9; 4	9; 0
3	(England) (Netherlands)	Sue Wright; Marjolein Houtsma	9; 2	9; 4	9; 4
