= 1994 European Squash Team Championships =

Squash tournament

- 23rd
- Location: (Netherlands) Zoetermeer
- Venue: Dekker Centre
- Date: 28 April – 1 May 1994
- Website europeansquash.com

Results
- Champions: Men England; Women England

The 1994 European Squash Team Championships was the 23rd edition of European Squash Team Championships for squash players. The event was held at the Dekker Centre in Zoetermeer, Netherlands, from 28 April to 1 May 1994. The tournament was organised by the European Squash Rackets Federation (ESRF).

The England men's team won their 19th title and the England women's team won their 17th title.

== Men's tournament ==
=== Group stage ===
Pool A

Pos	Team	P	W	D	L	Pts
1	England	3	2	1	0	5
2	Scotland	3	2	1	0	5
3	Sweden	3	1	0	2	2
4	Wales	3	0	0	3	0

Pool B

Pos	Team	P	W	L	Pts
1	Germany	3	3	0	6
2	France	3	2	1	4
3	Finland	3	1	2	2
4	Spain	3	0	3	0

=== Semi finals ===
England
4
Semi-final 1

France
0

			1	2	3	4	5
1	(England) (France)	Tony Hands; Julien Bonetat
2	(England) (France)	Phil Whitlock; John Elstob
3	(England) (France)	Jason Nicolle; Nicolas Arnoux
4	(England) (France)	Stephen Meads; Christophe Montagnier

Germany
2 (8)
Semi-final 2

Scotland
2 (6)

			1	2	3	4	5
1	(Germany) (Scotland)	Johann Wiens; Peter Nicol	1; 9	9; 6	5; 9	1; 9
2	(Germany) (Scotland)	Simon Frenz; Martin Heath	9; 5	9; 3	9; 6
3	(Germany) (Scotland)	Oliver Rucks; Derek Ritchie	9; 5	9; 2	9; 2
4	(Germany) (Scotland)	Florian Pössl; David Gordon	5; 9	9; 1	8; 10	2; 9

=== Third place ===
Scotland
2 (100)
Third place

France
2 (99)

			1	2	3	4	5
1	(Scotland) (France)	Peter Nicol; Julien Bonetat	9; 4	9; 3	9; 1
2	(Scotland) (France)	Martin Heath; John Elstob	0; 9	4; 9	9; 3	9; 2	9; 4
3	(Scotland) (France)	David Gordon; Nicolas Arnoux	2; 9	0; 9	9; 2	10; 8	4; 9
4	(Scotland) (France)	Barry Sutherland; Christophe Montagnier	7; 9	6; 9	4; 9

=== Final ===
England
4
Final

Germany
0

			1	2	3	4	5
1	(England) (Germany)	Stephen Meads; Florian Pössl	9; 2	9; 1	9; 4
2	(England) (Germany)	Jason Nicolle; Oliver Rucks	9; 4	9; 1	6; 9	9; 2
3	(England) (Germany)	Phil Whitlock; Simon Frenz	2; 9	10; 8	9; 3	9; 2
4	(England) (Germany)	Tony Hands; Johann Wiens	1; 9	9; 3	9; 3	9; 1

== Women's tournament ==
=== Group stage ===
Pool A

Pos	Team	P	W	L	Pts
1	England	3	3	0	6
2	(Republic of Ireland) Ireland	3	2	1	4
3	Scotland	3	1	2	2
4	Spain	3	0	3	0

Pool B

Pos	Team	P	W	L	Pts
1	Germany	3	3	0	6
2	Netherlands	3	2	1	4
3	France	3	1	2	2
4	Switzerland	3	0	3	0

=== Semi-finals ===
England
3
Semi-final 1

Netherlands
0

			1	2	3	4	5
1	(England) (Netherlands)	Suzanne Horner; Hugoline van Hoorn
2	(England) (Netherlands)	Cassie Jackman; Denise Sommers
3	(England) (Netherlands)	Fiona Geaves; Vanessa Atkinson

Germany
3
Semi-final 2

Ireland
0

			1	2	3	4	5
1	(Germany) (Republic of Ireland)	Sabine Schöne; Rebecca O'Callaghan
2	(Germany) (Republic of Ireland)	Sabine Baum; Aisling McArdle	9 x	9 x	9 x
3	(Germany) (Republic of Ireland)	Beate Seidler; Louise Finnegan	9; 3	9; 1	9; 1

=== Third place ===
Netherlands
2
Third place

Ireland
1

			1	2	3	4	5
1	(Netherlands) (Republic of Ireland)	Hugoline van Hoorn; Rebecca O'Callaghan	3; 9	2; 9	9; 4	2; 9
2	(Netherlands) (Republic of Ireland)	Denise Sommers; Aisling McArdle	9; 3	9; 4	9; 5
3	(Netherlands) (Republic of Ireland)	Vanessa Atkinson; Laura Mylotte	9; 2	9; 3	9; 2

=== Final ===
England
3
Final

Germany
0

			1	2	3	4	5
1	(England) (Germany)	Suzanne Horner; Sabine Schöne	9; 1	9; 0	9; 6
2	(England) (Germany)	Cassie Jackman; Sabine Baum	9; 2	9; 5	9; 3
3	(England) (Germany)	Fiona Geaves; Silke Bartel	9; 3	9; 5	9; 0
