= 2010 European Squash Team Championships =

Squash tournament

- 38th
- Location: (France) Aix-en-Provence
- Date: 27 April – 1 May 2010
- Website europeansquash.com

Results
- Champions: Men (England) England; Women Netherlands

The 2010 European Squash Team Championships was the 38th edition of European Squash Team Championships for squash players. The event was held in Aix-en-Provence, France, from 27 April to 1 May 2010. The tournament was organised by the European Squash Federation.

The England men's team won their 35th title and the Netherlands women's team won their first title and became the first team other than England to win the women's event.

== Men's tournament ==
=== Group stage ===
Group A

Pos	Team	P	W	D	L	Pts
1	England	3	3	0	0	6
2	Netherlands	3	2	0	1	4
3	Germany	3	1	0	2	2
4	Finland	3	0	0	3	0

Group B

Pos	Team	P	W	D	L	Pts
1	France	3	3	0	0	6
2	Wales	3	1	1	1	3
3	(Republic of Ireland) Ireland	3	1	1	1	3
4	Scotland	3	0	0	3	0

=== Semi-finals ===
England
4
Semi-final 1

Wales
0

			1	2	3	4	5
1	(England) (Wales)	James Willstrop; Peter Creed	11; 4	11; 7	11; 6
2	(England) (Wales)	Nick Matthew; Jethro Binns	11; 2	11; 5	11; 8
3	(England) (Wales)	Peter Barker; Nic Birt	11; 2	11; 7
4	(England) (Wales)	Daryl Selby; Lewys Hurst	11; 2	11; 1

France
4
Semi-final 2

Netherlands
0

			1	2	3	4	5
1	(France) (Netherlands)	Thierry Lincou; Dylan Bennett	12; 10	11; 6	11; 4
2	(France) (Netherlands)	Grégory Gaultier; Laurens Jan Anjema	11; 6	11; 4	11; 8
3	(France) (Netherlands)	Renan Lavigne; Piëdro Schweertman	11; 4	11; 7
4	(France) (Netherlands)	Mathieu Castagnet; Sebastian Weenink	11; 3	11; 6

=== Third place ===
Netherlands
3
Third place

Wales
0

			1	2	3	4	5
1	(Netherlands) (Wales)	Laurens Jan Anjema; Jethro Binns	11; 2	11; 2	11; 2
2	(Netherlands) (Wales)	Dylan Bennett; Peter Creed	11; 3	11; 6	11; 6
3	(Netherlands) (Wales)	Sebastian Weenink; Alex Gough	11; 5					retired

=== Final ===
England
4
Final

France
0

			1	2	3	4	5
1	(England) (France)	James Willstrop; Thierry Lincou	7; 11	11; 1	8; 11	11; 5	11; 7
2	(England) (France)	Nick Matthew; Grégory Gaultier	11; 9	11; 9	11; 6
3	(England) (France)	Daryl Selby; Mathieu Castagnet	12; 10	11; 7	11; 1
4	(England) (France)	Peter Barker; Renan Lavigne	11; 6	11; 5

== Women's tournament ==
=== Group stage ===
Group A

Pos	Team	P	W	L	Pts
1	England	3	3	0	6
2	(Republic of Ireland) Ireland	3	2	1	4
3	Germany	3	1	2	2
4	Italy	3	0	3	0

Group B

Pos	Team	P	W	L	Pts
1	France	3	3	0	6
2	Netherlands	3	2	1	4
3	Denmark	3	1	2	2
4	Switzerland	3	0	3	0

=== Semi-finals ===
Netherlands
2
Semi-final 1

England
1

			1	2	3	4	5
1	(Netherlands) (England)	Orla Noom; Tania Bailey	6; 11	3; 11	9; 11
2	(Netherlands) (England)	Vanessa Atkinson; Jenny Duncalf	11; 3	12; 10	8; 11	11; 5
3	(Netherlands) (England)	Annelize Naudé; Sarah Kippax	11; 8	11; 5	8; 11	11; 5

France
2
Semi-final 2

Ireland
1

			1	2	3	4	5
1	(France) (Republic of Ireland)	Maud Duplomb; Laura Mylotte	11; 8	5; 11	11; 4	11; 5
2	(France) (Republic of Ireland)	Camille Serme; Madeline Perry	11; 8	8; 11	9; 11	4; 11
3	(France) (Republic of Ireland)	Isabelle Stoehr; Aisling Blake	11; 7	11; 9	11; 5			not played

=== Third place ===
England
2
Third place

Ireland
1

			1	2	3	4	5
1	(England) (Republic of Ireland)	Jenny Duncalf; Madeline Perry	11; 7	8; 11	4; 11	11; 2	5; 11
2	(England) (Republic of Ireland)	Tania Bailey; Zoe Barr	11; 2	11; 1	11; 1
3	(England) (Republic of Ireland)	Sarah Kippax; Aisling Blake	11; 7	11; 3	11; 5

=== Final ===
Netherlands
2
Final

France
1

			1	2	3	4	5
1	(Netherlands) (France)	Vanessa Atkinson; Camille Serme	9; 11	11; 7	11; 3	11; 5
2	(Netherlands) (France)	Annelize Naudé; Isabelle Stoehr	11; 9	10; 12	11; 9	8; 11	8; 11
3	(Netherlands) (France)	Orla Noom; Maud Duplomb	11; 5	11; 8	11; 7
