= 2018 European Squash Team Championships =

Squash tournament

- 46th
- Location: (Poland) Wrocław
- Date: 2 – 5 May
- Website europeansquash.com

Results
- Champions: Men (France) France; Women England

The 2018 European Squash Team Championships was the 46th edition of European Squash Team Championships for squash players. The event was held in Wrocław from 2 to 5 May 2018. The tournament was organised by the European Squash Federation.

The France men's team won their 3rd title and the England women's team won their 40th title.

== Men's tournament ==
=== Group stage ===
Group A

Pos	Team	P	W	L	Pts
1	France	3	3	0	6
2	Spain	3	2	1	4
3	Scotland	3	1	2	2
4	Denmark	3	0	3	0

Group B

Pos	Team	P	W	L	Pts
1	England	3	3	0	6
2	Germany	3	2	1	4
3	Wales	3	1	2	2
4	Czech Republic	3	0	3	0

=== Semi-finals ===
England
2
Semi-final 1

Spain
1

			1	2	3	4	5
1	(England) (Spain)	Tom Richards; Carlos Cornes	11; 7	11; 6	11; 2
2	(England) (Spain)	James Willstrop; Borja Golan	7; 11	11; 8	7; 11	4; 11
3	(England) (Spain)	Declan James; Bernat Jaume	11; 9	11; 6	11; 8
4	(England) (Spain)	Daryl Selby; Iker Pajares						not played

France
3
Semi-final 2

Germany
0

			1	2	3	4	5
1	(France) (Germany)	Baptiste Masotti; Yannik Omlor	11; 3	11; 2	11; 8
2	(France) (Germany)	Grégory Gaultier; Simon Rösner	12; 14	11; 3	11; 5	11; 7
3	(France) (Germany)	Lucas Serme; Raphael Kandra	11; 8	11; 8
4	(France) (Germany)	Mathieu Castagnet; Raphael Kandra						not played

=== Third place ===
Germany
0
Third place

Spain
4

			1	2	3	4	5
1	(Germany) (Spain)	Raphael Kandra; Iker Pajares	11; 7	8; 11	8; 11	6; 11
2	(Germany) (Spain)	Simon Rösner; Borja Golan	11; 9	7; 11	4; 11	8; 11
3	(Germany) (Spain)	Valentin Rapp; Edmon Lopez-Moller	4; 11	5; 11
4	(Germany) (Spain)	Lucas Wirths; Carlos Cornes	6; 11

=== Final ===
France
2
Final

England
1

			1	2	3	4	5
1	(France) (England)	Mathieu Castagnet; James Willstrop	11; 2	11; 6	11; 4
2	(France) (England)	Grégory Gaultier; Nick Matthew	11; 7	11; 6	11; 7
3	(France) (England)	Lucas Serme; Daryl Selby	10; 12	3; 11	2; 11
4	(France) (England)	Baptiste Masotti; Declan James	8; 11	11; 9

== Women's tournament ==
=== Group stage ===
Group A

Pos	Team	P	W	L	Pts
1	England	3	3	0	6
2	Netherlands	3	2	1	4
3	Czech Republic	3	1	2	2
4	Switzerland	3	0	3	0

Group B

Pos	Team	P	W	L	Pts
1	France	3	3	0	6
2	Belgium	3	2	1	4
3	Wales	3	1	2	2
4	Germany	3	0	3	0

=== Semi-finals ===
England
3
Semi-final 1

Belgium
0

			1	2	3	4	5
1	(England) (Belgium)	Sarah-Jane Perry; Tinne Gilis	11; 6	11; 3	11; 7
2	(England) (Belgium)	Laura Massaro; Nele Gilis	11; 4	9; 11	11; 2	11; 9
3	(England) (Belgium)	Alison Waters; Loreline Pira	11; 3	11; 2

France
3
Semi-final 2

Netherlands
0

			1	2	3	4	5
1	(France) (Netherlands)	Coline Aumard; Tessa ter Sluis	11; 3	12; 10	11; 7
2	(France) (Netherlands)	Camille Serme; Milou van der Heijden	11; 2	11; 3	11; 6
3	(France) (Netherlands)	Enora Villard; Fleur Maas	11; 8	6; 11	11; 6

=== Third place ===
Belgium
2
Third place

Netherlands
0

			1	2	3	4	5
1	(Belgium) (Netherlands)	Nele Gilis; Milou Van Der Heijden	4; 11	11; 4	10; 12	11; 8	11; 8
2	(Belgium) (Netherlands)	Tinne Gilis; Natalie Grinham	11; 5	6; 11	11; 4	11; 4
3	(Belgium) (Netherlands)	Loreline Pira; Tessa Ter Sluis						not played

=== Final ===
England
2
Final

France
1

			1	2	3	4	5
1	(England) (France)	Laura Massaro; Camille Serme	5; 11	9; 11	7; 11
2	(England) (France)	Alison Waters; Coline Aumard	11; 8	11; 7	11; 5
3	(England) (France)	Victoria Lust; Mélissa Alves	11; 3	11; 5	11; 5
4	(England) (France)	Sarah-Jane Perry; Énora Villard						not played
