= 1987 European Squash Team Championships =

Squash tournament

- 15th
- Location: (Austria) Vienna
- Date: 18 – 22 March 1987
- Website europeansquash.com

Results
- Champions: Men England; Women England

The 1987 European Squash Team Championships, was the 15th edition of European Squash Team Championships for squash players. The event was held in Vienna, Austria, from 18 to 22 March 1987. The tournament was organised by the European Squash Rackets Federation (ESRF).

The England men's team won their 13th title and the England women's team won their 10th title.

== Men's tournament ==
=== First Round ===
Team 1	Team 2	Score
England		
Finland	Austria	5–0
West Germany		
Sweden		
Wales	Switzerland	5–0
Netherlands		
(Republic of Ireland) Ireland	Spain	3–2
France		

=== Quarter finals ===
Team 1	Team 2	Score
England	Wales	4–1
Finland	Netherlands	4–1
West Germany	(Republic of Ireland) Ireland	4–1
Sweden	France	

=== Semi finals ===
England
5
Semi-final 1

West Germany
0

			1	2	3	4	5
1	(England) (West Germany)	Geoff Williams; Michael Ehlers
2	(England) (West Germany)	Bryan Beeson; Carol Martini
3	(England) (West Germany)	Martin Bodimeade; Ralf Schuldt
4	(England) (West Germany)	Jamie Hickox; Jochen Arndt
5	(England) (West Germany)	Neil Harvey; Franz Schwerer

Sweden
5
Semi-final 2

Finland
0

			1	2	3	4	5
1	(Sweden) (Finland)	Jan-Ulf Söderberg; Matti Saarela	9; 10	9; 6	9; 0	7; 9	9; 0
2	(Sweden) (Finland)	Fredrik Johnson; Sami Elopuro	9; 4	9; 0	9; 5
3	(Sweden) (Finland)	Anders Wahlstedt; Pentti Pekkanen	9; 2	9; 5	9; 1
4	(Sweden) (Finland)	Björn Almström; Ari Simola	9; 2	9; 1	9; 5
5	(Sweden) (Finland)	Jonas Görnerup; Marko Pulli	9; 4	9; 5	9; 0

=== Third place ===
Finland
3
Third place

West Germany
2

			1	2	3	4	5
1	(Finland) (West Germany)	Pentti Pekkanen; Ralf Schuldt	9; 4	4; 9	3; 9	2; 9
2	(Finland) (West Germany)	Sami Elopuro; Carol Martini	9; 1	9; 3	9; 4
3	(Finland) (West Germany)	Arttu Mentula; Wilfried Bücker	9; 9	9; 7	6; 9	5; 9
4	(Finland) (West Germany)	Marko Pulli; Franz Schwerer	9; 6	10; 9	9; 2
5	(Finland) (West Germany)	Matti Saarela; Michael Ehlers	10; 9	9; 0	9; 0

=== Final ===
England
4
Final

Sweden
1

			1	2	3	4	5
1	(England) (Sweden)	Geoff Williams; Jan-Ulf Söderberg
2	(England) (Sweden)	Bryan Beeson; Fredrik Johnson
3	(England) (Sweden)	Martin Bodimeade; Anders Wahlstedt
4	(England) (Sweden)	Jamie Hickox; Jonas Görnerup
5	(England) (Sweden)	Neil Harvey; Björn Almström

== Women's tournament ==
=== First Round ===
Team 1	Team 2	Score
England		
(Republic of Ireland) Ireland	Italy	3–0
West Germany		
Finland	Denmark	3–0
Wales	France	3–0
Norway		
Spain		
Netherlands		

=== Quarter finals ===
Team 1	Team 2	Score
England	Wales	3–0
(Republic of Ireland) Ireland	Spain	3–0
West Germany	Netherlands	
Finland	Norway	3–0

=== Semi-finals ===
Ireland
3
Semi-final 1

Finland
0

			1	2	3	4	5
1	(Republic of Ireland) (Finland)	Rebecca Best; Tuula Myllyniemi	3; 2
2	(Republic of Ireland) (Finland)	Marjorie Burke; Katja Sauerwald	3; 0
3	(Republic of Ireland) (Finland)	Caroline Collins; Nina Taimiaho	3; 0

England
3
Semi-final 2

West Germany
0

			1	2	3	4	5
1	(England) (West Germany)	Lisa Opie; Andrea Holbe
2	(England) (West Germany)	Martine Le Moignan; Barbara Hammerschmid
3	(England) (West Germany)	Suzanne Burgess; Eva Körschgen

=== Third place ===
West Germany
2
Third place

Finland
1

			1	2	3	4	5
1	(West Germany) (Finland)	Tuula Myllyniemi; Andrea Holbe	3; 0
2	(West Germany) (Finland)	Katja Sauerwald; Barbara Hammerschmidt	3; 2
3	(West Germany) (Finland)	Nina Taimiaho; Eva Korschgen	0; 3

=== Final ===
England
3
Final

Ireland
0

			1	2	3	4	5
1	(England) (Republic of Ireland)	Lisa Opie; Rebecca Best	9; 2	9; 2	9; 2
2	(England) (Republic of Ireland)	Martine Le Moignan; Marjorie Burke	9; 5	9; 2	9; 2
3	(England) (Republic of Ireland)	Suzanne Burgess; Caroline Collins	9; 0	9; 0	9; 3
