= 1988 European Squash Team Championships =

Squash tournament

- 16th
- Location: (Netherlands) Warmond
- Venue: Dekker Sports Centre
- Date: 23 – 26 March 1988
- Website europeansquash.com

Results
- Champions: Men England; Women England

The 1988 European Squash Team Championships, sponsored by ICI Perspex, was the 16th edition of European Squash Team Championships for squash players. The event was held at the Dekker Sports Centre in Warmond, Netherlands, from 23 to 26 March 1988. The tournament was organised by the European Squash Rackets Federation (ESRF).

The England men's team won their 14th title and the England women's team won their 11th title.

== Men's tournament ==
=== First Round ===
Team 1	Team 2	Score
England	Italy	3–0
Finland	Spain	5–0
West Germany		
Sweden		
Wales		
Netherlands		
(Republic of Ireland) Ireland	Switzerland	4–1
Scotland	France	

=== Quarter finals ===
Team 1	Team 2	Score
England	Scotland	
Finland	Netherlands	4–1
Wales	West Germany	
Sweden	(Republic of Ireland) Ireland	4–1

=== Semi finals ===
England
5
Semi-final 1

Wales
0

			1	2	3	4	5
1	(England) (Wales)	Geoff Williams
2	(England) (Wales)	Bryan Beeson
3	(England) (Wales)	Martin Bodimeade
4	(England) (Wales)	Phil Whitlock
5	(England) (Wales)	Jason Nicolle

Sweden
3
Semi-final 2

Finland
2

			1	2	3	4	5
1	(Sweden) (Finland)	Fredrik Johnson; Sami Elopuro	9; 7	9; 1	9; 7	9; 6
2	(Sweden) (Finland)	Ulf Lagunoff; Marko Pulli	3; 9	5; 9	1; 9
3	(Sweden) (Finland)	Anders Wahlstedt; Pentti Pekkanen	5; 9	7; 9	3; 9
4	(Sweden) (Finland)	Björn Almström; Hannu Jaskari	9; 7	9; 0	9; 3
5	(Sweden) (Finland)	Jonas Görnerup; Matti Saarela	9; 2	9; 2	9; 4

=== Third place ===
Finland
4
Third place

Wales
1

			1	2	3	4	5
1	(Finland) (Wales)	Pentti Pekkanen; Cerryg Jones	9; 2	9; 5	9; 4
2	(Finland) (Wales)	Sami Elopuro; Adrian Davies	10; 8	5; 9	9; 6	9; 4
3	(Finland) (Wales)	Hannu Jaskari; Teifion Salisbury	9; 4	3; 9	2; 9	0; 9
4	(Finland) (Wales)	Marko Pulli; William Griffiths	9; 10	9; 3	9; 4	10; 9
5	(Finland) (Wales)	Matti Saarela; Andrew Evans	5; 9	9; 7	9; 6	9; 1

=== Final ===
England
5
Final

Sweden
0

			1	2	3	4	5
1	(England) (Sweden)	Geoff Williams; Fredrik Johnson
2	(England) (Sweden)	Bryan Beeson; Anders Wahlstedt
3	(England) (Sweden)	Martin Bodimeade; Jonas Görnerup
4	(England) (Sweden)	Phil Whitlock; Björn Almström
5	(England) (Sweden)	Jason Nicolle; Thomas Kjellker

== Women's tournament ==
=== First Round ===
Team 1	Team 2	Score
England		
(Republic of Ireland) Ireland	Austria	3–0
West Germany		
Finland	Belgium	3–0
Wales		
Scotland		
France		
Netherlands		

=== Quarter finals ===
Team 1	Team 2	Score
England		
(Republic of Ireland) Ireland	Netherlands	2–1
West Germany		
Wales	Finland	2–1

=== Semi-finals ===
Ireland
3
Semi-final 1

West Germany
0

			1	2	3	4	5
1	(Republic of Ireland) (West Germany)	Rebecca Best
2	(Republic of Ireland) (West Germany)	Marjorie Burke; A Muller	0; 9	6; 9	9; 3	9; 2	9; 7
3	(Republic of Ireland) (West Germany)	Brona Conway

England
3
Semi-final 2

Wales
0

			1	2	3	4	5
1	(England) (Wales)	Lisa Opie; Sian Johnson	9; 1	9; 1	9; 3
2	(England) (Wales)	Martine Le Moignan; Sharon Stephenson	9; 1	9; 0	9; 0
3	(England) (Wales)	Alison Cumings; Tracy Thomas	9; 6	9; 5	4; 9	9; 3

=== Third place ===
West Germany
?
Third place

Wales
?

		1	2	3	4	5
1	(West Germany) (Wales)	9	9	9
2	(West Germany) (Wales)	9	9	9
3	(West Germany) (Wales)	9	9	9

=== Final ===
England
2
Final

Ireland
1

			1	2	3	4	5
1	(England) (Republic of Ireland)	Lisa Opie; Rebecca Best	10; 8	9; 1	7; 9	7; 9	4; 9
2	(England) (Republic of Ireland)	Martine Le Moignan; Marjorie Burke
3	(England) (Republic of Ireland)	Alison Cumings; Brona Conway
