= 2016 European Squash Team Championships =

Squash tournament

- 44th
- Location: (Poland) Warsaw
- Venue: Kahuna Squash and Badminton
- Date: 4 – 7 May
- Website europeansquash.com

Results
- Champions: Men England; Women England

The 2016 European Squash Team Championships was the 44th edition of European Squash Team Championships for squash players. The event was held in Warsaw, Poland, from 4 to 7 May 2016. The tournament was organised by the European Squash Federation.

The England men's team won their 40th title and the England women's team won their 38th title.

== Men's tournament ==
=== Group stage ===
Group A

Pos	Team	P	W	D	L	Pts
1	France	3	3	0	0	6
2	Scotland	3	1	1	1	3
3	Spain	3	1	1	1	3
4	(Republic of Ireland) Ireland	3	0	0	3	0

Group B

Pos	Team	P	W	D	L	Pts
1	England	3	3	0	0	6
2	Germany	3	1	1	1	3
3	Netherlands	3	0	2	1	2
4	Switzerland	3	0	1	2	1

=== Semi-finals ===
England
2
Semi-final 1

Scotland
0

			1	2	3	4	5
1	(England) (Scotland)	Adrian Waller; Rory Stewart	11; 1	11; 5	11; 6
2	(England) (Scotland)	James Willstrop; Alan Clyne	4; 11	11; 6	11; 7	12; 10
3	(England) (Scotland)	Chris Simpson; Greg Lobban	9; 11	9; 11	11; 6	11; 6
4	(England) (Scotland)	Tom Richards; Douglas Kempsell						not played

France
3
Semi-final 2

Germany
0

			1	2	3	4	5
1	(France) (Germany)	Geoffrey Demont; Tobias Weggen	11; 5	11; 5	11; 3
2	(France) (Germany)	Grégory Gaultier; Raphael Kandra	11; 4	11; 6	11; 7
3	(France) (Germany)	Grégoire Marche; Rudi Rohrmüller	11; 7	11; 1
4	(France) (Germany)	Lucas Serme; Lukas Wirth						not played

=== Third place ===
Scotland
2
Third place

Germany
1

			1	2	3	4	5
1	(Scotland) (Germany)	Alan Clyne; Simon Rösner	15; 13	11; 4	5; 11	5; 11	5; 11
2	(Scotland) (Germany)	Greg Lobban; Raphael Kandra	6; 11	11; 6	5; 11	11; 9
3	(Scotland) (Germany)	Douglas Kempsell; Rudi Rohrmüller	11; 6	8; 11	11; 9	3; 11	11; 8
4	(Scotland) (Germany)	Kevin Moran; Wirth Lukas	11; 9	11; 9	7; 11	11; 3

=== Final ===
England
2
Final

France
1

			1	2	3	4	5
1	(England) (France)	Chris Simpson; Lucas Serme	11; 4	11; 1	11; 3
2	(England) (France)	James Willstrop; Grégory Gaultier	7; 11	7; 11	11; 4	1; 11
3	(England) (France)	Tom Richards; Geoffrey Demont	11; 8	11; 6	11; 2
4	(England) (France)	Daryl Selby; Grégoire Marche						not played

== Women's tournament ==
=== Group stage ===
Group A

Pos	Team	P	W	L	Pts
1	England	3	3	0	6
2	Wales	3	2	1	4
3	Belgium	3	1	2	2
4	Germany	3	0	3	0

Group B

Pos	Team	P	W	L	Pts
1	France	3	3	0	6
2	Netherlands	3	2	1	4
3	Denmark	3	1	2	2
4	(Republic of Ireland) Ireland	3	0	3	0

=== Semi-finals ===
England
3
Semi-final 1

Netherlands
0

			1	2	3	4	5
1	(England) (Netherlands)	Laura Massaro; Natalie Grinham	11; 8	11; 8	11; 7
2	(England) (Netherlands)	Sarah-Jane Perry; Milou van der Heijden	11; 7	7; 11	11; 2	11; 7
3	(England) (Netherlands)	Victoria Lust; Tessa ter Sluis	11; 7	11; 5

France
3
Semi-final 2

Wales
0

			1	2	3	4	5
1	(France) (Wales)	Camille Serme; Tesni Evans	11; 3	4; 11	11; 6	11; 8
2	(France) (Wales)	Coline Aumard; Deon Saffery	11; 8	11; 1	11; 5
3	(France) (Wales)	Laura Pomportes; Jenny Haley	11; 3	11; 9

=== Third place ===
Netherlands
2
Third place

Wales
1

			1	2	3	4	5
1	(Netherlands) (Wales)	Natalie Grinham; Tesni Evans	7; 11	5; 11	11; 4	7; 11
2	(Netherlands) (Wales)	Milou Van Der Heijden; Deon Saffery	12; 10	8; 11	11; 7	11; 7
3	(Netherlands) (Wales)	Tessa Ter Sluis; Jenny Haley	8; 11	11; 8	13; 11	5; 11	11; 9

=== Final ===
England
2
Final

France
0

			1	2	3	4	5
1	(England) (France)	Victoria Lust; Laura Pomportes	11; 6	11; 8	11; 11
2	(England) (France)	Laura Massaro; Camille Serme	11; 5	11; 1	11; 6
3	(England) (France)	Sarah-Jane Perry; Coline Aumard						not played
4	(England) (France)	Alison Waters; Chloé Mesic						not played
