= 2015 European Squash Team Championships =

Squash tournament

- 43rd
- Location: (Denmark) Herning
- Date: 29 April – 2 May 2015
- Website europeansquash.com

Results
- Champions: Men (France) France; Women England

The 2015 European Squash Team Championships was the 43rd edition of European Squash Team Championships for squash players. The event was held in Herning, Denmark, from 29 April to 2 May 2015. The tournament was organised by the European Squash Federation.

The France men's team won their first title and the England women's team won their 37th title.

== Men's tournament ==
=== Group stage ===
Group A

Pos	Team	P	W	L	Pts
1	England	3	3	0	6
2	Scotland	3	2	1	4
3	Netherlands	3	1	2	2
4	Wales	3	0	3	0

Group B

Pos	Team	P	W	L	Pts
1	France	3	3	0	6
2	Germany	3	2	1	4
3	Spain	3	1	2	2
4	Switzerland	3	0	3	0

=== Semi-finals ===
England
2
Semi-final 1

Germany
1

			1	2	3	4	5
1	(England) (Germany)	Daryl Selby; Jens Schoor	11; 2	2; 11	11; 2	11; 4
2	(England) (Germany)	Peter Barker; Simon Rösner	11; 5	11; 4	8; 11	5; 11	5; 11
3	(England) (Germany)	Chris Simpson; Rudi Rohrmüller	11; 6	11; 7	11; 7

France
3
Semi-final 2

Scotland
0

			1	2	3	4	5
1	(France) (Scotland)	Mathieu Castagnet; Greg Lobban	11; 3	11; 6	8; 11	11; 4
2	(France) (Scotland)	Grégory Gaultier; Alan Clyne	11; 6	11; 6	11; 3
3	(France) (Scotland)	Grégoire Marche; Dougie Kempsell	11; 6	11; 1

=== Third place ===
Germany
3
Third place

Scotland
1

			1	2	3	4	5
1	(Germany) (Scotland)	Simon Rösner; Alan Clyne	3; 11	3; 11	11; 4	11; 9
2	(Germany) (Scotland)	Raphael Kandra; Greg Lobban	5; 11	7; 11	11; 5	7; 11
3	(Germany) (Scotland)	Jens Schoor; Douglas Kempsell	12; 10	9; 11	11; 6
4	(Germany) (Scotland)	Rudi Rohrmüller; Kevin Moran	11; 4	11; 8	10; 12	11; 8

=== Final ===
France
2
Final

England
1

			1	2	3	4	5
1	(France) (England)	Grégory Gaultier; Peter Barker	12; 10	11; 8	10; 12	11; 3
2	(France) (England)	Mathieu Castagnet; Daryl Selby	6; 11	11; 9	11; 4	14; 12
3	(France) (England)	Grégoire Marche; James Willstrop	5; 11	11; 7	11; 6	8; 11	8; 11
4	(France) (England)	Lucas Serme; Chris Simpson	5; 11	11; 7

== Women's tournament ==
=== Group stage ===
Group A

Pos	Team	P	W	L	Pts
1	England	3	3	0	6
2	(Republic of Ireland) Ireland	3	2	1	4
3	Wales	3	1	2	2
4	Spain	3	0	3	0

Group B

Pos	Team	P	W	L	Pts
1	France	3	3	0	6
2	Denmark	3	2	1	4
3	Belgium	3	1	2	2
4	Czech Republic	3	0	3	0

=== Semi-finals ===
England
3
Semi-final 1

Denmark
0

			1	2	3	4	5
1	(England) (Denmark)	Alison Waters; Line Hansen	11; 8	8; 11	11; 8	9; 11	11; 5
2	(England) (Denmark)	Sarah-Jane Perry; Sally Skaarenebrg	11; 5	11; 3	11; 3
3	(England) (Denmark)	Jenny Duncalf; Cecile Mayer	11; 2	11; 4

France
2
Semi-final 2

Ireland
0

			1	2	3	4	5
1	(France) (Republic of Ireland)	Camille Serme; Madeline Perry	11; 6	10; 12	11; 8	11; 6
2	(France) (Republic of Ireland)	Coline Aumard; Aisling Blake	8; 11	11; 5	12; 10	7; 11	11; 6
3	(France) (Republic of Ireland)	Cyrielle Peltier; Laura Mylotte						not played

=== Third place ===
Ireland
2
Third place

Denmark
1

			1	2	3	4	5
1	(Republic of Ireland) (Denmark)	Madeline Perry; Line Hansen	13; 11	11; 9	11; 8
2	(Republic of Ireland) (Denmark)	Aisling Blake; Sally Skaarenborg	11; 6	11; 5	11; 6
3	(Republic of Ireland) (Denmark)	Ciara Moloney Doheny; Mathilde Lauridsen	7; 11	3; 11

=== Final ===
England
2
Final

France
1

			1	2	3	4	5
1	(England) (France)	Sarah-Jane Perry; Coline Aumard	11; 4	11; 6	2; 11	11; 6
2	(England) (France)	Alison Waters; Camille Serme	7; 11	4; 11	11; 9	5; 11
3	(England) (France)	Emma Beddoes; Laura Pomportes	11; 5	11; 5	11; 4
