= 2022 European Squash Team Championships =

Squash tournament

- 48th
- Location: (Netherlands) Eindhoven
- Venue: SquashTime Club show court - Klokgebouw, Strijp-S
- Date: 27 – 30 April
- Website europeansquash.com

Results
- Champions: Men England; Women England

The 2022 European Squash Team Championships was the 48th edition of European Squash Team Championships for squash players. The event was held in Eindhoven from 27 to 30 April 2022 and the show court was situated at the Klokgebouw, Strijp-S. The tournament was organised by the European Squash Federation.

The England men's team won their 42nd title and the England women's team won their 41st title.

== Men's tournament ==
=== Group stage ===
Group A

Pos	Team	P	W	L	Pts
1	England	2	2	0	4
2	France	2	2	0	4
3	Wales	3	1	2	2
4	Finland	3	0	3	0

Group B

Pos	Team	P	W	L	Pts
1	Scotland	3	2	1	4
2	Germany	3	2	1	4
3	Spain	3	1	2	2
4	Czech Republic	3	0	3	0

=== Semi-finals ===
England
3
Semi-final 1

Scotland
1

			1	2	3	4	5
1	(England) (Scotland)	Patrick Rooney; Alan Clyne	13; 11	12; 10	11; 4
2	(England) (Scotland)	Adrian Waller; Greg Lobban	11; 5	11; 9	11; 4
3	(England) (Scotland)	George Parker; Rory Stewart	7; 11	10; 12	9; 11
4	(England) (Scotland)	Nathan Lake; Fergus Richards	11; 2	11; 6

France
4
Semi-final 2

Germany
0

			1	2	3	4	5
1	(France) (Germany)	Baptiste Masotti; Simon Rösner	5; 11	12; 10	11; 9	9; 11	11; 5
2	(France) (Germany)	Gregoire Marche; Raphael Kandra	8; 11	11; 3	11; 6	11; 5
3	(France) (Germany)	Gregory Gaultier; Yannik Omlor	11; 3	11; 2	11; 4			retired
4	(France) (Germany)	Sébastien Bonmalais; Jan Wipperfurth	11; 2	11; 6

=== Third place ===
Scotland
3
Third place

Germany
1

			1	2	3	4	5
1	(Scotland) (Germany)
2	(Scotland) (Germany)	Greg Lobban; Raphael Kandra
3	(Scotland) (Germany)
4	(Scotland) (Germany)
5	(Scotland) (Germany)

=== Final ===
England
3
Final

France
0

			1	2	3	4	5
1	(England) (France)	Adrian Waller; Grégoire Marche	7; 11	8; 11	11; 7	12; 10	11; 6
2	(England) (France)	Nathan Lake; Sébastien Bonmalais	11; 3	11; 3	11; 8
3	(England) (France)	James Willstrop; Grégory Gaultier	11; 8	11; 9	7; 11	11; 7
4	(England) (France)	Patrick Rooney; Baptiste Masotti						not played

== Women's tournament ==
=== Group stage ===
Group A

Pos	Team	P	W	L	Pts
1	England	3	3	0	6
2	France	3	2	1	4
3	Scotland	3	1	2	2
4	Finland	3	0	3	0

Group B

Pos	Team	P	W	L	Pts
1	Wales	3	3	0	6
2	Netherlands	3	2	1	4
3	Germany	3	1	2	2
4	Belgium	3	0	3	0

=== Semi-finals ===
England
3
Semi-final 1

Netherlands
0

			1	2	3	4	5
1	(England) (Netherlands)	Lucy Turmel; Megan van Drongelen	11; 4	11; 5	11; 2
2	(England) (Netherlands)	Sarah-Jane Perry; Fleur Maas	14; 12	8; 11	11; 7	11; 8
3	(England) (Netherlands)	Jasmine Hutton; Juliette Permentier	11; 4	11; 1

Wales
2
Semi-final 2

France
1

			1	2	3	4	5
1	(Wales) (France)	Emily Whitlock; Énora Villard	11; 5	11; 3	11; 4
2	(Wales) (France)	Tesni Evans; Coline Aumard	11; 6	12; 10	11; 7
3	(Wales) (France)	Stacey Gooding; Marie Stéphan	4; 11	5; 11

=== Third place ===
Netherlands
2
Third place

France
0

			1	2	3	4	5
1	(Netherlands) (France)	Milou van der Heijden; Coline Aumard	11; 5	11; 4	11; 8
2	(Netherlands) (France)	Tessa ter Sluis; Enora Villard	11; 6	10; 12	6; 11	11; 9	11; 9
3	(Netherlands) (France)	Fleur Maas; Marie Stephan						not played

=== Final ===
England
2
Final

Wales
1

			1	2	3	4	5
1	(England) (Wales)	Sarah-Jane Perry; Tesni Evans	12; 14	6; 11	6; 11
2	(England) (Wales)	Gina Kennedy; Emily Whitlock	11; 2	11; 6	11; 8
3	(England) (Wales)	Lucy Turmel; Stacey Gooding	11; 4	11; 1	11; 2
4	(England) (Wales)	Jasmine Hutton; Lowri Roberts						not played
