= 2017 European Squash Team Championships =

Squash tournament

- 45th
- Location: (Finland) Helsinki
- Venue: Talihalli
- Date: 26 – 29 April
- Website europeansquash.com

Results
- Champions: Men (France) France; Women England

The 2017 European Squash Team Championships was the 45th edition of European Squash Team Championships for squash players. The event was held in Talihalli, Helsinki from 26 to 29 April 2017. The tournament was organised by the European Squash Federation.

The France men's team won their 2nd title and the England women's team won their 39th title.

== Men's tournament ==
=== Group stage ===
Group A

Pos	Team	P	W	L	Pts
1	France	3	3	0	6
2	Scotland	3	2	1	4
3	Finland	3	1	2	2
4	Czech Republic	3	0	3	0

Group B

Pos	Team	P	W	L	Pts
1	England	3	3	0	6
2	Germany	3	2	1	4
3	Spain	3	1	2	2
4	Switzerland	3	0	3	0

=== Semi-finals ===
England
4
Semi-final 1

Scotland
0

			1	2	3	4	5
1	(England) (Scotland)	Tom Richards; Rory Stewart	11; 2	11; 5	11; 4
2	(England) (Scotland)	Nick Matthew; Alan Clyne	11; 0	11; 3	11; 8
3	(England) (Scotland)	James Willstrop; Douglas Kempsell	11; 8	13; 11
4	(England) (Scotland)	Daryl Selby; Kevin Moran	11; 2	12; 10

France
4
Semi-final 2

Germany
0

			1	2	3	4	5
1	(France) (Germany)	Lucas Serme; Yannik Omlor	11; 1	11; 9	14; 12
2	(France) (Germany)	Grégory Gaultier; Simon Rösner	7; 11	11; 7	11; 4	11; 0
3	(France) (Germany)	Mathieu Castagnet; Raphael Kandra	8; 11	11; 4	13; 11
4	(France) (Germany)	Grégoire Marche; Valentin Rapp	11; 4	11; 2	11; 1

=== Third place ===
Germany
2 (133)
Third place

Scotland
2 (127)

			1	2	3	4	5
1	(Germany) (Scotland)	Rudi Rohrmüller; Douglas Kempsell	13; 11	11; 2	11; 13	11; 9
2	(Germany) (Scotland)	Simon Rösner; Alan Clyne	6; 11	8; 11	3; 11
3	(Germany) (Scotland)	Raphael Kandra; Greg Lobban	5; 11	11; 5	11; 5	12; 10
4	(Germany) (Scotland)	Valentin Rapp; Kevin Moran	9; 11	8; 11	9; 11

=== Final ===
France
3
Final

England
0

			1	2	3	4	5
1	(France) (England)	Grégoire Marche; Daryl Selby	13; 11	9; 11	11; 7	11; 8
2	(France) (England)	Gregory Gaultier; Nick Matthew	12; 10	11; 4	10; 12	11; 6
3	(France) (England)	Mathieu Castagnet; James Willstrop	11; 6	5; 11	11; 5	11; 4
4	(France) (England)	Lucas Serme; Tom Richards						not played

== Women's tournament ==
=== Group stage ===
Group A

Pos	Team	P	W	L	Pts
1	England	3	3	0	6
2	Wales	3	2	1	4
3	Belgium	3	1	2	2
4	Denmark	3	0	3	0

Group B

Pos	Team	P	W	L	Pts
1	France	3	3	0	6
2	Netherlands	3	2	1	4
3	Czech Republic	3	1	2	2
4	Spain	3	0	3	0

=== Semi-finals ===
England
2
Semi-final 1

Netherlands
0

			1	2	3	4	5
1	(England) (Netherlands)	Victoria Lust; Tessa ter Sluis	11; 9	11; 6	11; 4
2	(England) (Netherlands)	Sarah-Jane Perry; Milou van der Heijden	12; 10	11; 3	11; 2
3	(England) (Netherlands)	Fiona Moverley; Judith Diepeveen						not played

France
3
Semi-final 2

Wales
0

			1	2	3	4	5
1	(France) (Wales)	Coline Aumard; Deon Saffery	11; 6	9; 11	11; 9	13; 11
2	(France) (Wales)	Camille Serme; Tesni Evans	11; 5	5; 11	11; 6	7; 11	11; 8
3	(France) (Wales)	Laura Pomportes; Jenny Haley	11; 5	11; 7	11; 3

=== Third place ===
Wales
2
Third place

Netherlands
1

			1	2	3	4	5
1	(Wales) (Netherlands)	Tesni Evans; Milou Van Der Heijden	11; 6	11; 4	11; 7
2	(Wales) (Netherlands)	Lowri Roberts; Tessa Ter Sluis	5; 11	13; 11	6; 11	8; 11
3	(Wales) (Netherlands)	Deon Saffery; Natalie Grinham	9; 11	11; 7	13; 15	11; 6	11; 8

=== Final ===
England
2
Final

France
0

			1	2	3	4	5
1	(England) (France)	Sarah-Jane Perry; Camille Serme	11; 8	8; 11	9; 11	14; 12	11; 7
2	(England) (France)	Fiona Moverley; Laura Pomportes	14; 12	11; 5	4; 11	7; 11	11; 8
3	(England) (France)	Victoria Lust; Mélissa Alves						not played
4	(England) (France)	Alison Waters; Coline Aumard						not played
