= 2012 Women's World Team Squash Championships =

Women's World Team 2012
- 18th WSF World Women's Team Championship
- Location: Nîmes, France
- Date: November 12–17, 2012
- Teams: 26 (from all the 5 confederations)
- Website www.worldwomensquash-nimes2012.fr/en/

Results
- Champions: Egypt
- Runners-up: England
- Third place: Malaysia

The 2012 Women's World Team Squash Championships was the women's edition of the 2012 World Team Squash Championships, which serves as the world team championship for squash players. The event was held in Nîmes, France from November 12 to 17, 2012. The tournament was organized by the World Squash Federation and the French Squash Federation. The Egypt team won their second World Team Championships, beating the English team in the final.

== Participating teams ==
A total of 26 teams competed from all the five confederations: Africa, America, Asia, Europe and Oceania. For Argentina, Czech Republic, Namibia and South Korea, it was their first participation at a world team championship.

Africa (SFA)	America (FPS)	Asia (ASF)	Europe (ESF)	Oceania (OSF)	Map
Egypt; Namibia; South Africa	Argentina; Canada; Colombia; Mexico; United States	China; Hong Kong; India; Japan; Malaysia; South Korea	Austria; Czech Republic; England; France (Host Country); Germany; Ireland; Netherlands; Scotland; Spain; Wales	Australia (Title Holder); New Zealand	Map of the participating nations

== Seeds ==
1. England (final)
2. Egypt (champion)
3. Malaysia (semifinals)
4. Hong Kong (quarterfinals)
5. New Zealand (quarterfinals)
6. Australia (semifinals)
7. (Republic of Ireland) Ireland (quarterfinals)
8. Netherlands (round of 16)
9. France (round of 16)
10. India (quarterfinals)
11. Canada (round of 16)
12. United States (round of 16)
13. Czech Republic (round of 16)
14. South Africa (round of 16)
15. Wales (round of 16)
16. Mexico (round of 16)

== Squads ==
England

- Laura Massaro
- Alison Waters
- Jenny Duncalf
- Sarah Kippax

Mexico

- Samantha Terán
- Karla Urrutia
- Nayelly Hernández
- Monsserrat Castellanos

South Korea

- Song Sun-mi
- Park Eun-Ok
- Yang Yeon-Soe
- Kim Ga-Hye

Egypt

- Raneem El Weleily
- Nour El Sherbini
- Nour El Tayeb
- Omneya Abdel Kawy

Wales

- Tesni Evans
- Deon Saffery
- Hannah Davies
- Fiona Murphy

Scotland

- Lisa Aitken
- Frania Gillen-Buchert
- Alex Clark
- Rosie Allen

Malaysia

- Nicol David
- Low Wee Wern
- Delia Arnold
- Siti Munirah Jusoh

South Africa

- Siyoli Waters
- Diana Haynes
- Milnay Louw
- Cheyna Tucker

China

- Li Dongjin
- Gu Jinyeu
- Xiu Chen
- Not Used

Spain

- Marina De Juan Gallach
- Xisela Aranda Núñez
- Cristina Gómez
- Chantal Moros-Pitarch

Hong Kong

- Annie Au
- Joey Chan
- Liu Tsz-Ling
- Tong Tsz-Wing

Czech Republic

- Lucie Fialová
- Olga Ertlová
- Anna Klimundova
- Kristyna Alexova

Colombia

- Catalina Peláez
- Silvia Angulo
- Karol González
- Anna Porras

Namibia

- Isabel Schnoor
- Adrianna Lambert
- Lucinda Rodrigues
- Ruth Hornickel

New Zealand

- Joelle King
- Jaclyn Hawkes
- Kylie Lindsay
- Amanda Landers-Murphy

United States

- Natalie Grainger
- Kristen Lange
- Sabrina Sobhy
- Olivia Fiechter

Japan

- Misaki Kobayashi
- Chinatsu Matsui
- Mayu Yamazaki
- Risa Sugimoto

Australia

- Rachael Grinham
- Donna Urquhart
- Melody Francis
- Sarah Cardwell

Canada

- Samantha Cornett
- Alexandra Norman
- Susannah King
- Stephanie Edmison

Austria

- Birgit Coufal
- Judith Gradnitzer
- Jacqueline Peychar
- Ines Winkler

(Republic of Ireland) Ireland

- Madeline Perry
- Aisling Blake
- Laura Mylotte
- Breanne Flynn

India

- Dipika Pallikal
- Joshna Chinappa
- Anaka Alankamony
- Aparajitha Balamurukan

Argentina

- Antonella Falcione
- Cecilia Cerquetti
- Fernanda Rocha
- Maria Bonilla

Netherlands

- Natalie Grinham
- Orla Noom
- Milou van der Heijden
- Milja Dorenbos

France

- Camille Serme
- Coline Aumard
- Maud Duplomb
- Laura Pomportes

Germany

- Pamela Hathway
- Franziska Hennes
- Annika Weise
- Caroline Sayegh

== Group stage ==
=== Pool A ===
England	3	-	0	South Korea

England	3	-	0	Mexico

Mexico	2	-	1	South Korea

Rank	Nation	Match	Win	Low	Points
1	England	2	2	0	4
2	Mexico	2	1	1	2
3	South Korea	2	0	2	0

=== Pool B ===
Egypt	3	-	0	Scotland

Egypt	3	-	0	Wales

Wales	3	-	0	Scotland

Rank	Nation	Match	Win	Low	Points
1	Egypt	2	2	0	4
2	Wales	2	1	1	2
3	Scotland	2	0	2	0

=== Pool C ===
Malaysia	3	-	0	China
South Africa	3	–	0	Spain

Malaysia	3	-	0	South Africa
China	2	–	1	Spain

Malaysia	3	-	0	Spain
South Africa	3	–	0	China

Rank	Nation	Match	Win	Low	Points
1	Malaysia	3	3	0	6
2	South Africa	3	2	1	4
3	China	3	1	2	2
4	Spain	3	0	3	0

=== Pool D ===
Hong Kong	3	-	0	Colombia
Czech Republic	3	–	0	Namibia

Hong Kong	3	-	0	Czech Republic
Colombia	3	–	0	Namibia

Hong Kong	3	-	0	Namibia
Czech Republic	3	–	0	Colombia

Rank	Nation	Match	Win	Low	Points
1	Hong Kong	3	3	0	6
2	Czech Republic	3	2	1	4
3	Colombia	3	1	2	2
4	Namibia	3	0	3	0

=== Pool E ===
New Zealand	3	-	0	Japan

New Zealand	3	-	0	United States

United States	2	-	1	Japan

Rank	Nation	Match	Win	Low	Points
1	New Zealand	2	2	0	4
2	United States	2	1	1	2
3	Japan	2	0	2	0

=== Pool F ===
Australia	3	-	0	Austria

Australia	3	-	0	Canada

Canada	3	-	0	Austria

Rank	Nation	Match	Win	Low	Points
1	Australia	2	2	0	4
2	Canada	2	1	1	2
3	Austria	2	0	2	0

=== Pool G ===
(Republic of Ireland) Ireland	3	-	0	Argentina

(Republic of Ireland) Ireland	1	-	2	India

India	3	-	0	Argentina

Rank	Nation	Match	Win	Low	Points
1	India	2	2	0	4
2	(Republic of Ireland) Ireland	2	1	1	2
3	Argentina	2	0	2	0

=== Pool H ===
Netherlands	3	-	0	Germany

Netherlands	1	-	2	France

France	3	-	0	Germany

Rank	Nation	Match	Win	Low	Points
1	France	2	2	0	4
2	Netherlands	2	1	1	2
3	Germany	2	0	1	0

== Finals ==
Poster of Women's World Squash Team 2012

=== Draw ===
Round of 16
1	England	3	3
15	Wales	0	0
7	(Republic of Ireland) Ireland	3	3	2
9	France	2	2	0
5	New Zealand	2	3	3
11	Canada	3	1	0
13	Czech Republic	0	0
3	Malaysia	3	3
4	Hong Kong	0	3	3
14	South Africa	3	2	2
12	United States	2	0	1
6	Australia	3	3	2
10	India	3	0	3
8	Netherlands	0	3	2
16	Mexico	0	0	0
2	Egypt	3	3	2

Quarterfinals
1	England	3	3	2
7	(Republic of Ireland) Ireland	1	0	0
5	New Zealand	0	1
3	Malaysia	3	3
4	Hong Kong	1	0	2
6	Australia	3	3	1
10	India	0	0	0
2	Egypt	3	3	2

Semifinals
1	England	0	3	3
3	Malaysia	3	0	1
6	Australia	1	0	1
2	Egypt	3	3	2

Final
1	England	3	1	2
2	Egypt	2	3	3

Third place match
3	Malaysia	3	3	2
6	Australia	0	0	0

=== Results ===
==== Quarterfinals ====
England
3
QUARTER FINAL
Nîmes, France
15 November 2012
Central Glass Court

Ireland
0

			1	2	3	4	5
1	(England) (Republic of Ireland)	N°1 Laura Massaro; N°1 Madeline Perry	7; 11	11; 2	11; 8	11; 9
2	(England) (Republic of Ireland)	N°2 Alison Waters; N°2 Aisling Blake	11; 7	11; 3	11; 3
3	(England) (Republic of Ireland)	N°3 Jenny Duncalf; N°3 Breanne Flynn	11; 3	11; 2

New Zealand
0
QUARTER FINAL
Nîmes, France
15 November 2012
Central Glass Court

Malaysia
2

			1	2	3	4	5
1	(New Zealand) (Malaysia)	N°1 Joelle King; N°1 Nicol David	5; 11	7; 11	4; 11
2	(New Zealand) (Malaysia)	N°2 Jaclyn Hawkes; N°2 Low Wee Wern	3; 11	5; 11	13; 11	9; 11
3	(New Zealand) (Malaysia)	N°3 Amanda Landers-Murphy; N°3 Delia Arnold

Hong Kong
1
QUARTER FINAL
Nîmes, France
15 November 2012
Glass Court 1

Australia
2

			1	2	3	4	5
1	(Hong Kong) (Australia)	N°1 Annie Au; N°1 Rachael Grinham	3; 11	8; 11	11; 4	8; 11
2	(Hong Kong) (Australia)	N°2 Joey Chan; N°2 Donna Urquhart	5; 11	6; 11	8; 11
3	(Hong Kong) (Australia)	N°3 Liu Tsz-Ling; N°3 Sarah Cardwell	11; 9	6; 11	11; 7

India
0
QUARTER FINAL
Nîmes, France
15 November 2012
Glass Court 1

Egypt
3

			1	2	3	4	5
1	(India) (Egypt)	N°1 Dipika Pallikal; N°1 Raneem El Weleily	14; 16	4; 11	7; 11
2	(India) (Egypt)	N°2 Joshna Chinappa; N°2 Nour El Sherbini	7; 11	6; 11	9; 11
3	(India) (Egypt)	N°3 Anaka Alankamony; N°3 Nour El Tayeb	6; 11	3; 11

==== Semifinals ====
England
2
SEMI FINAL
Nîmes, France
16 November 2012
Central Glass Court

Malaysia
1

			1	2	3	4	5
1	(England) (Malaysia)	N°1 Laura Massaro; N°1 Nicol David	5; 11	6; 11	8; 11
2	(England) (Malaysia)	N°3 Jenny Duncalf; N°3 Delia Arnold	11; 7	11; 9	11; 9
3	(England) (Malaysia)	N°2 Alison Waters; N°2 Low Wee Wern	11; 6	7; 11	11; 9	11; 5

Australia
0
SEMI FINAL
Nîmes, France
16 November 2012
Central Glass Court

Egypt
3

			1	2	3	4	5
1	(Australia) (Egypt)	N°1 Rachael Grinham; N°1 Raneem El Weleily	7; 11	11; 14	9; 11	9; 11
2	(Australia) (Egypt)	N°3 Melody Francis; N°3 Nour El Tayeb	6; 11	2; 11	5; 11
3	(Australia) (Egypt)	N°2 Donna Urquhart; N°2 Nour El Sherbini	10; 12	11; 6	8; 11

==== Final ====
England
1
FINAL
Nîmes, France
17 November 2012
Central Glass Court

Egypt
2

			1	2	3	4	5
1	(England) (Egypt)	N°2 Alison Waters; N°2 Nour El Sherbini	11; 5	8; 11	9; 11	11; 3	11; 5
2	(England) (Egypt)	N°1 Laura Massaro; N°1 Raneem El Weleily	11; 3	10; 12	4; 11	10; 12
3	(England) (Egypt)	N°3 Jenny Duncalf; N°3 Omneya Abdel Kawy	11; 7	8; 11	4; 11	11; 6	8; 11

2012 WSF World Team Championship

Egypt
2nd title

Team
Raneem El Weleily – Nour El Sherbini – Omneya Abdel Kawy – Nour El Tayeb

== Post-tournament team ranking ==
Position	Team	Result
1st	Egypt	Champions
2nd	England	Final
3rd	Malaysia	Semifinal
4th	Australia	Semifinal
5th	India	Quarterfinal
6th	(Republic of Ireland) Ireland	Quarterfinal
7th	New Zealand	Quarterfinal
8th	Hong Kong	Quarterfinal

Position	Team	Result
9th	France	Round of 16
10th	Netherlands	Round of 16
11th	South Africa	Round of 16
12th	Canada	Round of 16
13th	United States	Round of 16
14th	Czech Republic	Round of 16
15th	Wales	Round of 16
16th	Mexico	Round of 16

Position	Team	Result
17th	South Korea	Group Stage
18th	Japan	Group Stage
19th	Germany	Group Stage
20th	Colombia	Group Stage
21st	Scotland	Group Stage
22nd	China	Group Stage
23rd	Spain	Group Stage
24th	Argentina	Group Stage

Position	Team	Result
25th	Austria	Group Stage
26th	Namibia	Group Stage

== See also ==
- World Team Squash Championships

Preceded by New Zealand (Palmerston North); 2010	Squash World Team; France (Nîmes); 2012	Succeeded by Canada (Niagara-on-the-Lake); 2014
