= Declan James =

English squash player (born 1993)

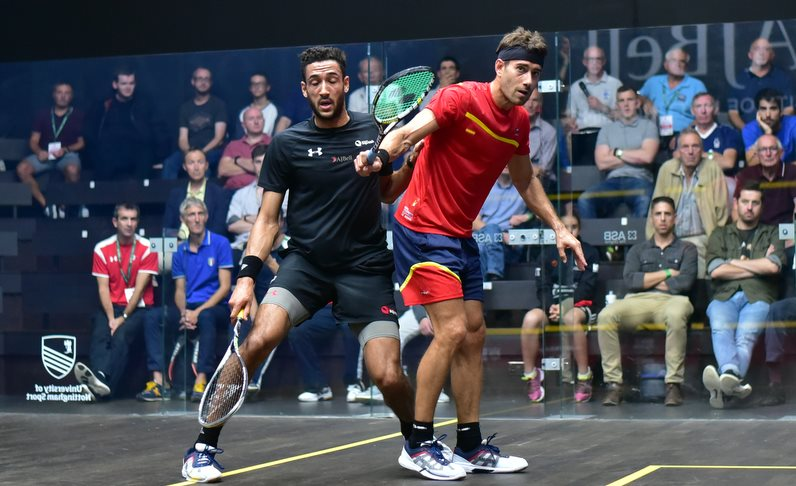
- James (left) against Borja Golán 2017

Personal information
- Born: 19 April 1993 (age 33) Nottingham, England
- Height: 6 ft 3 in (1.91 m)
- Weight: 83 kg (183 lb)

Sport
- Country: England
- Turned pro: 2011
- Coached by: Nick Matthew
- Retired: Active
- Racquet used: Dunlop Hyperfibre+ Evolution 130

Men's singles
- Highest ranking: No. 15 (May 2019)
- Current ranking: No. 28 (14 July 2025)
- Title: 21
Medal record
Men's squash
Representing England
World Team Championships
Silver medal – second place	2019 Washington D.C.	Team
World Doubles Championships
Gold medal – first place	2022 Glasgow	Doubles
Bronze medal – third place	2017 Manchester	Doubles
Commonwealth Games
Gold medal – first place	2022 Birmingham	Doubles
Bronze medal – third place	2018 Gold Coast	Doubles
European Team Championships
Silver medal – second place	2017 Helsinki	Team
Silver medal – second place	2018 Wrocław	Team
Gold medal – first place	2019 Birmingham	Team

Declan James (born 19 April 1993) is a professional squash player who represented England. He reached a career high ranking of 15 in the world during May 2019.

== Biography ==
James reached the world's top 50 players in July 2015 after winning his fifth PSA tour event, the Christchurch International Open.

In 2017, he won the Irish and Arnold Tring Homes Opens and in 2018, won the International de Squash de Nantes, which was his 13th tour title. In 2018, he won a bronze medal in the doubles at the Commonwealth Games, on the Gold Coast. In May 2019, he hit a career best world ranking (at the time) of 15.

James won European Squash Team Championships gold for the England men's national squash team at the 2019 European Squash Team Championships in Birmingham.

At the 2022 Commonwealth Games he won the gold medal, partnering James Willstrop in the men's doubles.

In 2024, James won his 17th PSA title after securing victory in the London Open during the 2024–25 PSA Squash Tour.
