= Dominique Lloyd-Walter =

English squash player (born 1981)

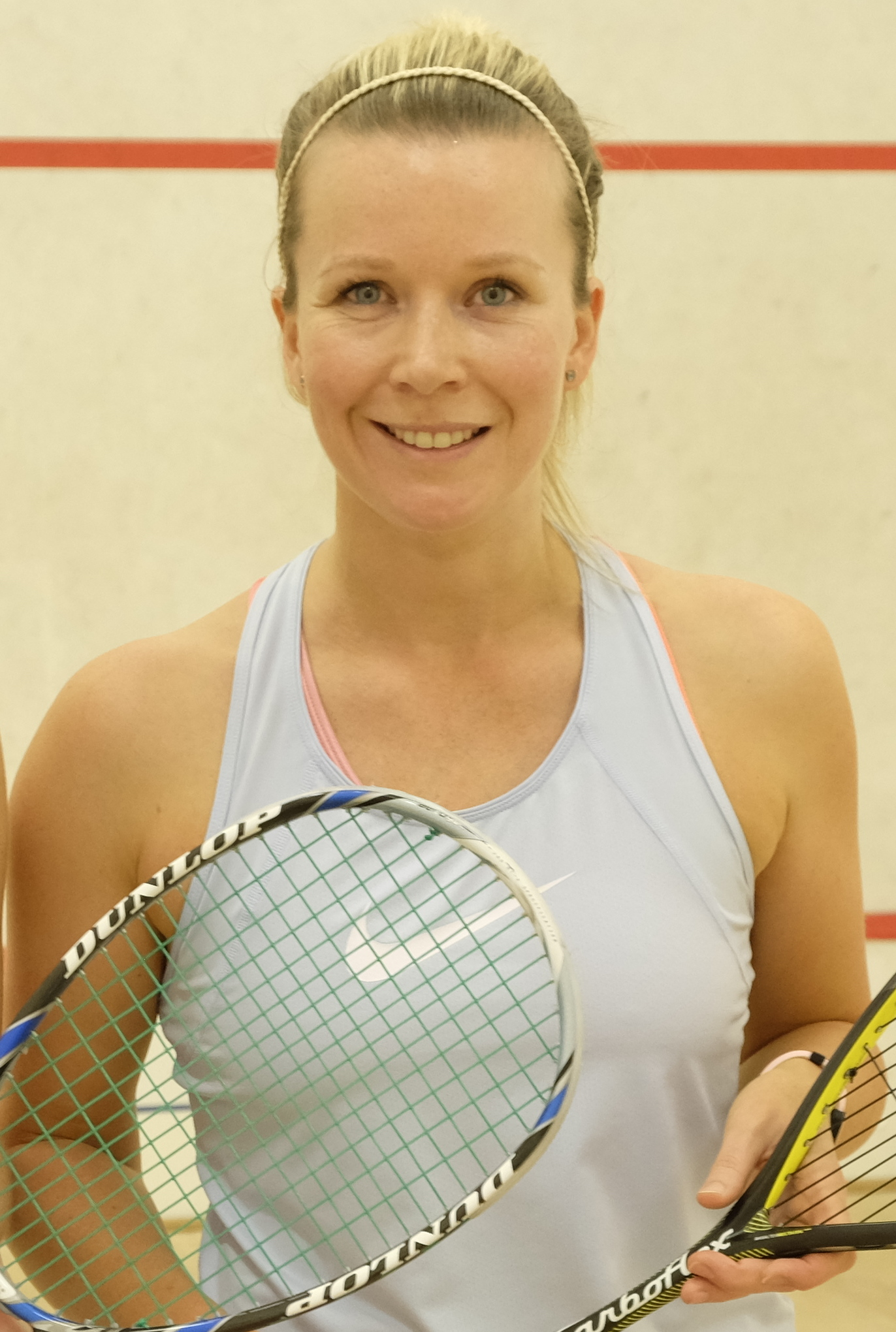
- Dominique Lloyd-Walter (2018)

Personal information
- Born: 17 June 1981 (age 45) Harrow, Middlesex, England

Sport
- Country: England
- Handedness: Right Handed
- Turned pro: 1999
- Coached by: Ian Robinson
- Retired: Retired
- Racquet used: Harrow

Women's singles
- Highest ranking: No. 18 (November 2006)
- Title: 8
- Tour final: 9
Medal record
Women's squash
Representing England
European Team Championships
Bronze medal – third place	2010 Aix-en-Provence	Team
Gold medal – first place	2011 Espoo	Team

Dominique Lloyd-Walter (born 17 June 1981) is an English retired professional squash player. She reached a career high ranking of 18 in the world during November 2006.

== Biography ==
Lloyd-Walter was educated at Haberdashers' Aske's School for Girls.

She won a gold medal for the England women's national squash team at the 2011 European Squash Team Championships in Espoo.
