= Germany national squash team =

Germany national squash team may refer to:

- Germany men's national squash team
- Germany women's national squash team
