= Tony Hands =

English squash player

Personal information
- Born: c.1970

Sport
- Country: England

Men's singles
- Highest ranking: No. 9 (31 December 1993)
Medal record
Men's squash
Representing England
European Team Championships
Gold medal – first place	1993 Aix-en-Provence	Team
Gold medal – first place	1994 Zoetermeer	Team

Tony Hands (born c.1970) is an English former professional squash player. He reached a career-high world ranking of 9 on 31 December 1993.

== Biography ==
Hands finished runner-up to Del Harris in the Suffolk Junior Open (U14) in March 1983 and had progressed to Essex and East of England U19 champion by 1987.

He played for Ardleigh Hall and represented Essex at county level. He was called up for the England U19 team in 1989 and played for Chelmsford, while steadily moving up the British rankings.

Hands later played for Lambwath Hall Sports and then North Walsham and reached the 1991 semi-finals of the British National Squash Championships. He had reached the world's top 30 and Britain's top 10 by the beginning of 1992 and was world number 18 by the end of the year.

Hands won two gold medals for the England men's national squash team at the European Squash Team Championships at the 1993 European Squash Team Championships and the 1994 European Squash Team Championships.

He was ranked 4 in Britain in August 1993 and joined Cardiff-based Leekes Wizards along with fellow England internartional Chris Walker. Hands reached world number 9 at the end of 1993.
