= Daryl Selby =

English squash player (born 1982)

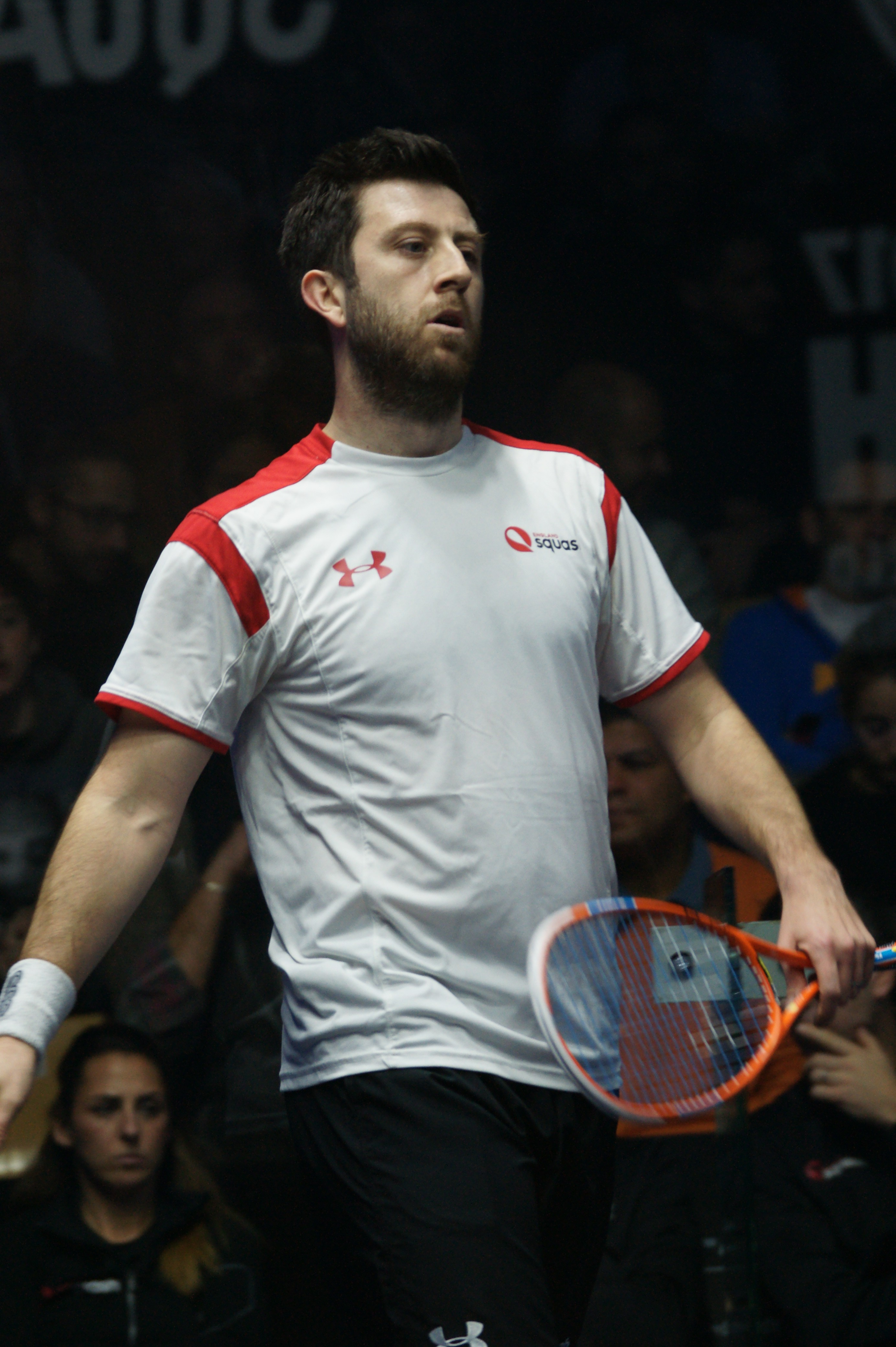
- Daryl Selby at the 2017 Men's World Team Squash Championships

Personal information
- Nationality: British (English)
- Born: 3 November 1982 (age 43) Harlow, Essex
- Height: 1.83 m (6 ft 0 in)
- Weight: 72 kg (159 lb)

Sport
- Handedness: Right Handed
- Turned pro: 2004
- Coached by: Paul Selby
- Retired: 2022

Men's singles
- Highest ranking: No. 9 (April, 2010)
- Title: 13
- Tour final: 23
- World Open: QF (2013)
Medal record
Men's squash
Representing England
World Team Championships
Gold medal – first place	2013 Mulhouse	Team
Silver medal – second place	2011 Paderborn	Team
Silver medal – second place	2017 Marseille	Team
Silver medal – second place	2019 Washington D.C.	Team
World Doubles Championships
Silver medal – second place	2017 Manchester	Mixed doubles
Commonwealth Games
Silver medal – second place	2018 Gold Coast	Doubles
Silver medal – second place	2022 Birmingham	Doubles
Bronze medal – third place	2014 Glasgow	Doubles
European Team Championships
Gold medal – first place	2009 Malmö	Team
Bronze medal – third place	2010 Aix-en-Provence	Team
Gold medal – first place	2011 Espoo	Team
Gold medal – first place	2012 Nuremberg	Team
Gold medal – first place	2013 Amsterdam	Team
Gold medal – first place	2014 Riccione	Team
Silver medal – second place	2015 Herning	Team
Gold medal – first place	2016 Warsaw	Team
Silver medal – second place	2017 Helsinki	Team
Silver medal – second place	2018 Wrocław	Team
Gold medal – first place	2019 Birmingham	Team

Daryl Selby (born 3 November 1982) is a former professional squash player who represented England. He reached a career-high world ranking of World No. 9 in April 2010.

== Biography ==
Selby attended Brentwood School, Essex as his secondary school between 1994 and 2001. His sister is professional squash player Lauren Selby.

Selby represented the 2010 England team at the 2010 Commonwealth Games in Delhi, India, where he competed in the singles and doubles.

He won the British National Squash Championships in 2011, defeating the reigning World Champion and World No.1, Nick Matthew in the final 9-11, 11-9, 6-11, 11-9, 11-7 (84m).

In 2012, he reached the semifinals of the Tournament of Champions, losing to James Willstrop in semifinals. In June 2013, he was gold medalist with the England Team during the 2013 World Team Championships. In the same year, in reached for the first time the quarterfinals of the World Championships.

Selby attended the Commonwealth Games again after representing the 2014 England team at the 2014 Commonwealth Games in Glasgow, Scotland, where he competed in the squash events and won a doubles bronze medal, partnering James Willstrop.

Selby won seven gold medals for the England men's national squash team at the European Squash Team Championships from 2009 to 2019.

He retired in August 2022, after having won another silver medal in the doubles competition of the 2022 Commonwealth Games.
