= Chris Simpson (squash player) =

English squash player (born 1987)

Personal information
- Born: 30 March 1987 (age 39) Guernsey, Channel Islands, UK
- Height: 5 ft 9 in (1.75 m)
- Weight: 72 kg (159 lb)

Sport
- Country: England; Guernsey
- Turned pro: 2005
- Coached by: David Pearson; David Campion
- Retired: 2019
- Racquet used: Karakal

Men's singles
- Highest ranking: No. 20 (April 2014)
- Title: 8
- Tour final: 11
Medal record
Men's squash
Representing England
European Team Championships
Silver medal – second place	2015 Herning	Team
Gold medal – first place	2016 Warsaw	Team

Chris Simpson (born 30 March 1987 in Guernsey) is a professional squash player who represented England. His career-high world ranking was No. 20 in April 2014.

== Biography ==
Simpson has competed in the Professional Squash Association World Squash Championships from 2009 to 2019.

Simpson won a European Squash Team Championships gold medal for the England men's national squash team at the 2016 European Squash Team Championships in Warsaw.

== Tournament wins ==
- Men's CLIC Sargent St George's Hill Classic 2015
- Men's Bedell Jersey Classic 2014
- Men's FantasySquash Nottingham Open 2013
- Men's Bedell Jersey Classic 2013
