= Women's United States Open (squash) 2021 =

US Open 2021
- 21st Women's US Open

Details
- Event name: US Open 2021
- Location: (United States) Philadelphia, Pennsylvania
- Venue: Arlen Specter US Squash Center
- Dates: 1–6 October 2021
- Website www.usopensquash.com

Men's Winner
- Prize money: $150,000
- Year: 2021–22 PSA World Tour

The Women's United States Squash Open 2021 was the women's edition of the 2021 United States Open (squash), which was a 2021–22 PSA World Tour Platinum event (prize money: $150,000). The event took place at the Arlen Specter US Squash Center in Philadelphia, Pennsylvania in the United States from the 1st of October to the 6th of October.

Nouran Gohar of Egypt was the reigning champion and won her second US Open title by beating fellow Egyptian player Hania El Hammamy in the final with a score of 9–11, 11–9, 11–7, 11–3.

== Seeds ==
1. (Egypt) Nour El Sherbini (semi-finals)
2. (Egypt) Nouran Gohar (champion)
3. (New Zealand) Hania El Hammamy (runner-up)
4. (Egypt) Amanda Sobhy (third round)
5. (Egypt) Sarah-Jane Perry (quarter-finals)
6. (Egypt) Joelle King (quarter-finals)
7. (Peru) Salma Hany (second round)
8. (Egypt) Rowan Elaraby (second round)

== Draw and results ==
=== Semi finals and final ===
Semi-finals
1	(Egypt) Nour El Sherbini	11	7	10	7
3	(Egypt) Hania El Hammamy	8	11	12	11
(United States) Olivia Fiechter	5	2	3
2	(Egypt) Nouran Gohar	11	11	11

Final
3	(Egypt) Hania El Hammamy	11	9	7	3
2	(Egypt) Nouran Gohar	9	11	11	11

=== Main draw ===
==== Top half ====
First round
1	(Egypt) Nour El Sherbini
[Bye]
(Hong Kong) Tsz-Wing Tong	7	5	11	11	12
(England) Julianne Courtice	11	11	8	6	10
(Egypt) Nadine Shahin
[Bye]
(United States) Olivia Clyne
[Bye]
(England) Lucy Turmel	11	11	7	11
(Hong Kong) Liu Tsz-Ling	5	6	11	4
(Egypt) Sana Ibrahim	4	7	6
(France) Mélissa Alves	11	11	11
(United States) Haley Mendez	6	4	1
(England) Georgina Kennedy	11	11	11
8	(Egypt) Rowan Elaraby
[Bye]
6	(Egypt) Joelle King
[Bye]
(United States) Lucie Stefanoni	5	3	11	2
(Malaysia) Sivasangari Subramaniam	11	11	9	11
(India) Joshna Chinappa
[Bye]
(Czech Republic) Anna Serme	11	3	14	6	12
(Netherlands) Milou van der Heijden	9	11	12	11	10
(Egypt) Nada Abbas	11	11	11
(Egypt) Menna Nasser	2	5	3
(United States) Marina Stefanoni	11	11	11
(Canada) Danielle Letourneau	6	2	6
(Scotland) Lisa Aitken	11	11	11
(Latvia) Ineta Mackeviča	6	6	4
3	(Egypt) Hania El Hammamy
[Bye]

Second round
1	(Egypt) Nour El Sherbini	11	11	11
(Hong Kong) Tsz-Wing Tong	6	6	5
(Egypt) Nadine Shahin	11	13	4	11
(United States) Olivia Clyne	9	11	11	9
(England) Lucy Turmel	8	8	6
(France) Mélissa Alves	11	11	11
(England) Georgina Kennedy	11	11	11
8	(Egypt) Rowan Elaraby	7	6	1
6	(New Zealand) Joelle King	14	11	11
(Malaysia) Sivasangari Subramaniam	12	7	4
(India) Joshna Chinappa	11	11	11
(Czech Republic) Anna Serme	2	7	3
(Egypt) Nada Abbas	11	11	12
(United States) Marina Stefanoni	1	2	10
(Scotland) Lisa Aitken	4	11	6
3	(Egypt) Hania El Hammamy	11	13	11

Third round
1	(Egypt) Nour El Sherbini	11	11	11
(Egypt) Nadine Shahin	2	6	7
(France) Mélissa Alves	11	11	11
(England) Georgina Kennedy	8	2	6
6	(New Zealand) Joelle King	11	11	11
(India) Joshna Chinappa	3	4	6
(Egypt) Nada Abbas	11	7	10	4
3	(Egypt) Hania El Hammamy	9	11	12	11

Quarter-finals
1	(Egypt) Nour El Sherbini	11	11	11
(France) Mélissa Alves	5	3	4
Semi-finals
1	(Egypt) Nour El Sherbini	11	7	10	7
3	(Egypt) Hania El Hammamy	8	11	12	11
6	(New Zealand) Joelle King	2	8	7
3	(Egypt) Hania El Hammamy	11	11	11

==== Bottom half ====
First round
4	(United States) Amanda Sobhy
[Bye]
(Hong Kong) Ka Yi Lee	11	1	11	11
(South Africa) Alexandra Fuller	6	11	6	2
(United States) Olivia Fiechter	11	11	11
(Egypt) Menna Hamed	6	7	8
(Canada) Nicole Bunyan	11	6	11	7	5
(Australia) Donna Lobban	8	11	6	11	11
(Belgium) Nele Gilis
[Bye]
(Wales) Tesni Evans
[Bye]
(Canada) Hollie Naughton
[Bye]
7	(Egypt) Salma Hany
[Bye]
5	(England) Sarah-Jane Perry
[Bye]
(Egypt) Jana Shiha	11	6	5	12	3
(Egypt) Zeina Mickawy	9	11	11	10	11
(Egypt) Farida Mohamed	6	14	13	8	11
(England) Jasmine Hutton	11	12	11	11	7
(Egypt) Mayar Hany	3	6	5
(Wales) Emily Whitlock	11	11	11
(France) Coline Aumard	7	6	2
(Hong Kong) Tze Lok Ho	11	11	11
(England) Alison Waters
[Bye]
(United States) Sabrina Sobhy
[Bye]
2	(Egypt) Nouran Gohar
[Bye]

Second round
4	(United States) Amanda Sobhy	11	11	11
(Hong Kong) Ka Yi Lee	4	2	9
(United States) Olivia Fiechter	11	11	11
(Australia) Donna Lobban	6	4	5
(Belgium) Nele Gilis	11	11	11
(Wales) Tesni Evans	8	7	5
(Canada) Hollie Naughton	11	19	11
7	(Egypt) Salma Hany	5	17	7
5	(England) Sarah-Jane Perry	12	8	12	12	11
(Egypt) Zeina Mickawy	14	11	10	10	9
(Egypt) Farida Mohamed	11	5^{r}
(Wales) Emily Whitlock	9	11
(Hong Kong) Tze Lok Ho	6	8	9
(England) Alison Waters	11	11	11
(United States) Sabrina Sobhy	9	7	4
2	(Egypt) Nouran Gohar	11	11	11

Third round
4	(United States) Amanda Sobhy	1	11	3	11	9
(United States) Olivia Fiechter	11	8	11	8	11
(Belgium) Nele Gilis	11	17	12	11
(Canada) Hollie Naughton	7	19	10	3
5	(England) Sarah-Jane Perry	11	1	11	9	11
(Wales) Emily Whitlock	4	11	3	11	4
(England) Alison Waters	4	8	5
2	(Egypt) Nouran Gohar	11	11	11

Quarter-finals
(United States) Olivia Fiechter	11	11	11
(Belgium) Nele Gilis	5	5	8
Semi-finals
(United States) Olivia Fiechter	5	2	3
2	(Egypt) Nouran Gohar	11	11	11
5	(England) Sarah-Jane Perry	7	6	7
2	(Egypt) Nouran Gohar	11	11	11

== See also ==
- Men's United States Open (squash) 2021
