= Victoria Lust =

English squash player (born 1989)

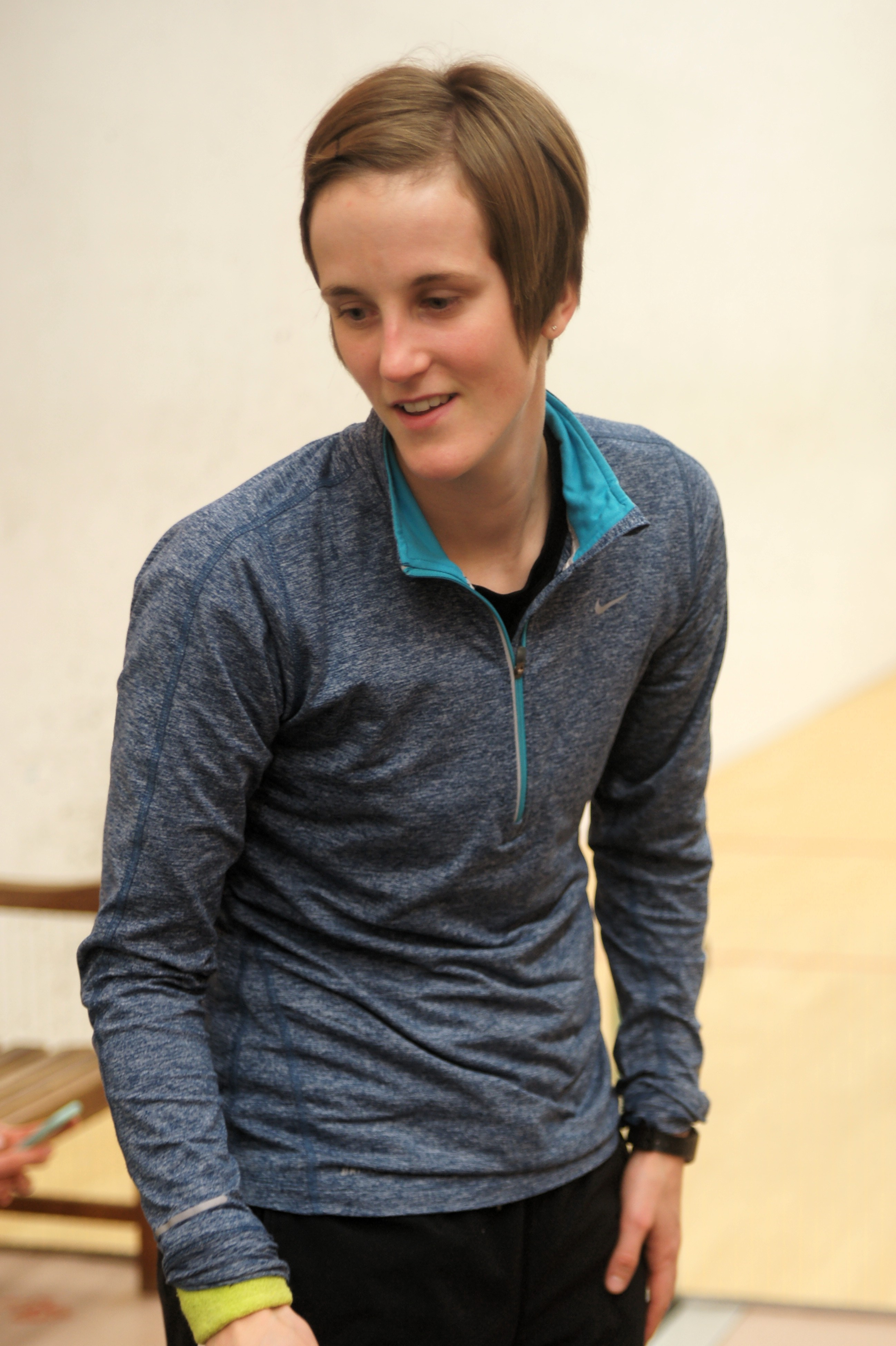
- Victoria Lust, Monte-Carlo Squash Classic 2016

Personal information
- Born: 2 May 1989 (age 37) Luton, England

Sport
- Country: England
- Handedness: Right Handed
- Coached by: Keir Worth & Paul Carter
- Retired: 2020
- Racquet used: HEAD

Women's singles
- Highest ranking: No. 12 (June 2019)
- Title: 4
- Tour final: 12
Medal record
Women's squash
Representing England
World Team Championships
Silver medal – second place	2016 Issy-les-Moulineaux	Team
Silver medal – second place	2018 Dalian	Team
European Team Championships
Gold medal – first place	2015 Herning	Team
Gold medal – first place	2016 Warsaw	Team
Gold medal – first place	2017 Helsinki	Team
Gold medal – first place	2018 Wrocław	Team
Silver medal – second place	2019 Birmingham	Team

Victoria Lust (born 2 May 1989 in Luton) is an English former professional squash player. She reached a career-high world ranking of World No. 12 in June 2019.

== Biography ==
In 2016, she was part of the English team that won the silver medal at the 2016 Women's World Team Squash Championships. Two years later, she was again a member of the silver medalist English team at the 2018 Women's World Team Squash Championships.

Lust won four consecutive gold medals for the England women's national squash team at the European Squash Team Championships from 2015 to 2018.

She retired from professional squash in March 2020. After that, she moved to Victoria, in British Columbia, and worked at St. Michaels University School as a squash teacher before moving to Seattle in the United States, after receiving another job offer.
