= France national squash team =

France national squash team may refer to:

- France men's national squash team
- France women's national squash team
