= Mélissa Alves =

French squash player (born 1993)

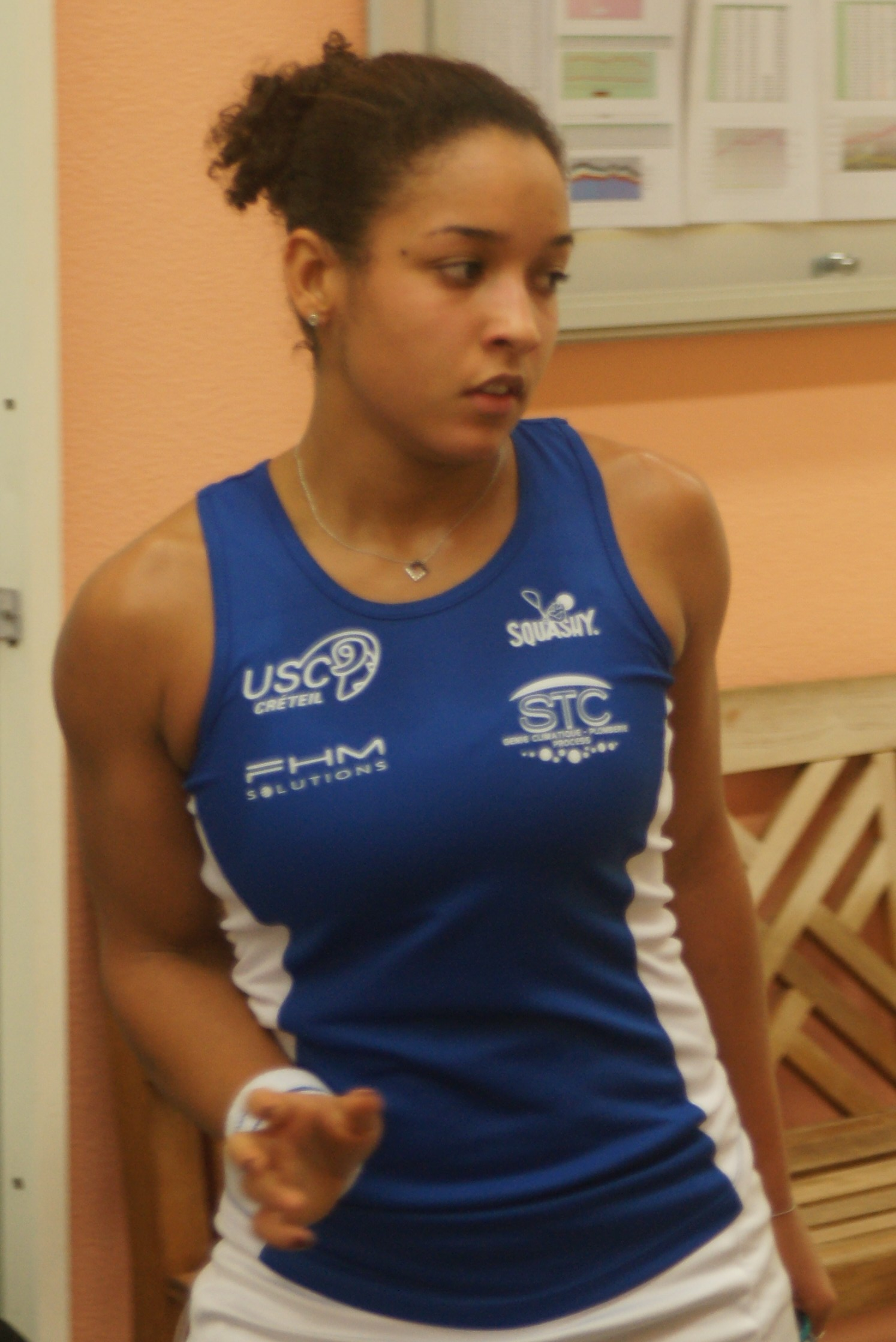
- Mélissa Alves, Monte Carlo Squash Classic 2018

Personal information
- Born: 29 December 1993 (age 32) Kourou, French Guiana
- Education: University of Pennsylvania

Sport
- Country: France
- Handedness: Right Handed
- Turned pro: 2018
- Retired: Active
- Racquet used: Tecnifibre

Women's singles
- Highest ranking: No. 18 (December 2022)
- Current ranking: No. 20 (14 July 2025)
- Title: 12
Medal record
Women's squash
Representing France
World Team Championships
Bronze medal – third place	2018 Dalian	Team

Mélissa Alves (born 29 December 1993) is a French professional squash player. She reached a career high ranking of number 18 in the world during December 2024.

== Biography ==
She began playing squash at the age of five at the Tennis Squash club in Kourou. She went on to win French youth titles, and at the age of 16 joined the INSEP, initially staying with Coline Aumard mother. She was triple French junior champion from 2011 to 2013, and in 2013 reached the quarter-finals of the World Squash Junior Championships. She then spent four years at the University of Pennsylvania., She won bronze with the France women's national squash team at the World Team Championships and silver at the European Squash Team Championships.

In 2018, she was part of the French team that won the bronze medal at the 2018 Women's World Team Squash Championships.

She was a finalist at the French Championships in February 2019 against Camille Serme and the following week, she took part in the World Championships for the first time, passing the first two rounds against Samantha Cornett and Salma Hany, both seeded, before losing to Nour El Tayeb.

In April 2019, she enters the top 50 for the first time. She is a member of the France women's national squash team which in 2019 achieves a historic feat by beating the English team in the final of the European Squash Team Championships, the English team's second defeat in 42 years of competition. She provided the decisive point by winning the final match against Victoria Lust, ranked 13th in the world.

In October 2021, at the Women's United States Open (squash) 2021, she reached the quarter-finals of a PSA Platinum tournament for the first time, losing only to world champion Nour El Sherbini. She will break into the top 20 for the first time in December 2021.

In 2024, Alves won her 10th PSA title after securing victory in the Cape Town Open during the 2024–25 PSA Squash Tour and followed up the success by winning the Vancouver Open in March 2025. She won a 12th title (the Monte Carlo Classic) during the 2025–26 PSA Squash Tour.
