= German Squash Association =

Sports governing body in Germany

Deutscher Squash Verband
- Sport: Squash
- Abbreviation: DSQV
- Founded: 1973
- Regional affiliation: European Squash Federation
- Location: Münster
- President: Michael Gäde
- Secretary: Alexander Korsch
- Men's coach: Oliver Pettke
- Women's coach: Uwe Peters

Official website
- dsqv.de
- (Germany)

German Squash Association ("Deutscher Squash Verband" in German), also known as the DSQV, is the governing body of squash federations and clubs in Germany.

== See also ==
- Germany men's national squash team
- Germany women's national squash team
