= Swedish Squash Federation =

Squash governing body in Sweden

Svenska Squashförbundet
- Sport: Squash
- Founded: 1965
- Regional affiliation: European Squash Federation
- Location: Malmö
- Chairman: Björn Strandberg

Official website
- iof3.idrottonline.se/SvenskaSquashforbundet/
- (Sweden)

The Swedish Squash Federation (Swedish: Svenska Squashförbundet) is the national organisation for squash in Sweden. It divides the country into five districts. The organisation was founded in 1965 and is headquartered in Malmö. The chairman is Björn Strandberg (since 2013). Current u19 Champion is Tor Christoffersen (Malmö).

== See also ==
- Sweden men's national squash team
