= Aisling Blake =

Irish squash player (born 1981)

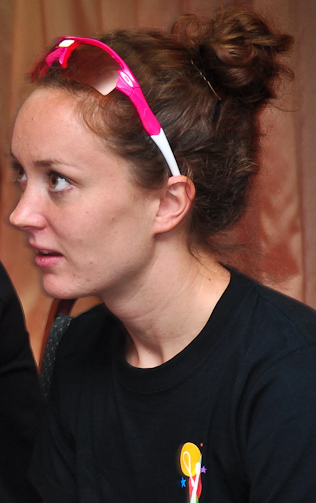
- Aisling Blake during the Squash Stars Meet the Stars session 2010.

Personal information
- Nationality: Irish
- Born: 23 July 1981 (age 45) Dublin, Ireland

Sport
- Handedness: Right Handed
- Turned pro: 2001
- Coached by: Liz Irving
- Retired: Active
- Racquet used: Tecnifibre

Women's singles
- Highest ranking: No. 21 (February 2013)
- Title: 4
- Tour final: 10
- World Open: 1st Rnd (2009, 2010)
Medal record
European Team Championships
Bronze medal – third place	2005 Amsterdam	Team
Bronze medal – third place	2011 Espoo	Team
Silver medal – second place	2012 Nuremberg	Team
Silver medal – second place	2013 Amsterdam	Team
Bronze medal – third place	2015 Herning	Team
Irish Championships
Gold medal – first place	2012/13	singles

Aisling Blake (born 23 July 1981) is a former professional squash player who represented Ireland. She reached a career-high world ranking of World No. 21 in February 2013 and was a champion of Ireland.

== Biography ==
Blake won five medals with the Ireland women's national squash team at the European Squash Team Championships.

During the 2012/13 season, Blake won the national title at the Irish National Squash Championships, which took place in March 2013.
