= Julien Balbo =

French squash player (born 1979)

Personal information
- Born: 23 May 1979 (age 47) Grenoble, France
- Height: 1.77 m (5 ft 10 in)
- Weight: 76 kg (168 lb)

Sport
- Country: France
- Turned pro: 2002
- Coached by: Paul Sciberras
- Retired: 2013
- Racquet used: Karakal

Men's singles
- Highest ranking: No. 42 (August 2008)
- Title: 3
- Tour final: 15
Medal record
Men's squash
Representing France
World Team Championships
Silver medal – second place	2003 Vienna	Team
Bronze medal – third place	2005 Islamabad	Team
Bronze medal – third place	2007 Chennai	Team
- Updated on September 2017

Julien Balbo (born 23 May 1979 in Grenoble) is a professional squash player who represented France. He reached a career-high world ranking of World No. 42 in August 2008.
