= Hugoline van Hoorn =

Dutch squash player (born 1969)

Personal information
- Born: 1969 (age 56–57) Eindhoven, Netherlands

Sport
- Country: Netherlands
- Handedness: Left-handed
- Retired: Yes

Women's singles
- Highest ranking: No. 21 (1995)
- Updated on May 2018

Hugoline van Hoorn (born 1969) is a female Dutch former professional squash player who represented the Netherlands. She reached a career-high world ranking of 21 in 1995. She was the Dutch national champion four times.
