= Orla Noom =

Dutch squash player (born 1985)

Personal information
- Born: 2 November 1985 (age 40) Haarlem, Netherlands

Sport
- Country: Netherlands
- Handedness: Left Handed
- Turned pro: 2002
- Coached by: Lucas Buit
- Retired: Active
- Racquet used: Prince

Women's singles
- Highest ranking: No. 31 (November, 2007)
- Current ranking: No. 64 (November, 2012)
- Title: 5
- Tour final: 12
- Updated on November, 2012

Orla Noom (born 2 November 1985 in Haarlem) is a Dutch professional squash player. She reached a career-high world ranking of World No. 31 in November 2007.

She was part of the Dutch team, together with Annelize Naudé and Vanessa Atkinson, that won the 2010 European Women's Championship in Aix-en-Provence, defeating the English team (2–1) in the semi-final, and France (2–1) in the final.
