= Sweden men's national squash team =

Sweden
- Coach: John Milton
- Association: Svenska Squashförbundet
- Colors: Yellow or Black

World Team Championships
- First year: 1976
- Titles: 0
- Runners-up: 0
- Best finish: 5th
- Entries: 18

European Team Championships
- Titles: 2
- Runners-up: 10
- Best finish: 1st

The Sweden men's national squash team represents Sweden in international squash team competitions, and is governed by Svenska Squashförbundet.

Since 1976, Sweden has participated in three quarter finals of the World Squash Team Open.

== Current team ==
- Christian Drakenberg
- Rasmus Hult
- Badr Abdel Aziz
- Daniel Forslund
- Joakim Karlsson

== Results ==
=== World Team Squash Championships ===
Year	Result	Position	W	L
(Australia) Melbourne 1967	Did not present			
(England) Birmingham 1969	Did not present			
(New Zealand) Palmerston North 1971	Did not present			
(South Africa) Johannesburg 1973	Did not present			
(England) Birmingham 1976	Group Stage	6th	4	3
(Canada) Toronto 1977	Group Stage	6th	2	5
(Australia) Brisbane 1979	Group Stage	6th	5	3
(Sweden) Stockholm 1981	Quarter Final	6th	5	3
(New Zealand) Auckland 1983	Group Stage	6th	4	4
(Egypt) Cairo 1985	Group Stage	9th	7	2
(England) London 1987	Quarter Final	5th	6	2
Singapore 1989	Quarter Final	7th	4	4
(Finland) Helsinki 1991	Group Stage	7th	3	3
(Pakistan) Karachi 1993	Group Stage	7th	3	3
(Egypt) Cairo 1995	Group Stage	12th	1	5
(Malaysia) Petaling Jaya 1997	Group Stage	10th	4	2
(Egypt) Cairo 1999	Group Stage	9th	5	1
(Australia) Melbourne 2001	Round of 16	13th	3	4
(Austria) Vienna 2003	Round of 16	16th	2	5
(Pakistan) Islamabad 2005	Did not present			
(India) Chennai 2007	Group Stage	17th	5	2
(Denmark) Odense 2009	Group Stage	22nd	2	4
(Germany) Paderborn 2011	Group Stage	28th	2	5
(France) Mulhouse 2013	Did not present			
(Egypt) Cairo 2015	Cancelled			
(France) Marseille 2017	Did not present			
(United States) Washington, D.C. 2019	Did not present			
Total	18/26	0 Title	67	60

=== European Squash Team Championships ===
Year	Result	Position
(Scotland) Edinburgh 1973	Not in the Top 4	
(Sweden) Stockholm 1974	Not in the Top 4	
(Republic of Ireland) Dublin 1975	Semi Final	3rd
(Belgium) Brussels 1976	Semi Final	3rd
(England) Sheffield 1977	Final	2nd
(Netherlands) Amsterdam 1978	Final	2nd
(Germany) Hamburg 1979	Final	2nd
(Finland) Helsinki 1980	Champions	1st
(Netherlands) Amsterdam 1981	Final	2nd
(Wales) Cardiff 1982	Final	2nd
(Germany) Munich 1983	Champions	1st
(Republic of Ireland) Dublin 1984	Final	2nd
(Spain) Barcelona 1985	Final	2nd
(France) Aix-en-Provence 1986	Final	2nd
(Austria) Vienna 1987	Final	2nd
(Netherlands) Warmond 1988	Final	2nd
(Finland) Helsinki 1989	Final	2nd
(Switzerland) Zürich 1990	Semi Final	4th
(Germany) Gelsenkirchen 1991	Not in the Top 4	
(France) Aix-en-Provence 1992	Semi Final	4th
(France) Aix-en-Provence 1993	Semi Final	4th
(Germany) Zoetermeer 1994	Not in the Top 4	
(Netherlands) Amsterdam 1995	Semi Final	3rd
(Netherlands) Amsterdam 1996	Not in the Top 4	
(Denmark) Odense 1997	Not in the Top 4	
(Finland) Helsinki 1998	Not in the Top 4	
(Austria) Linz 1999	Not in the Top 4	
(Austria) Vienna 2000	Not in the Top 4	
(Netherlands) Eindhoven 2001	Not in the Top 4	
(Germany) Böblingen 2002	Not in the Top 4	
(England) Nottingham 2003	Not in the Top 4	
(France) Rennes 2004	Not in the Top 4	
(Netherlands) Amsterdam 2005	Not in the Top 4	
(Austria) Vienna 2006	Not in the Top 4	
(Italy) Riccione 2007	Not in the Top 4	
(Netherlands) Amsterdam 2008	Not in the Top 4	
(Sweden) Malmö 2009	Not in the Top 4	
(France) Aix-en-Provence 2010	Not in the Top 4	
(Finland) Espoo 2011	Not in the Top 4	
(Germany) Nuremberg 2012	Not in the Top 4	
(Netherlands) Amsterdam 2013	Not in the Top 4	
(Italy) Riccione 2014	Not in the Top 4	
(Denmark) Herning 2015	Not in the Top 4	
(Poland) Warsaw 2016	Not in the Top 4	
(Finland) Helsinki 2017	Not in the Top 4	
(Poland) Wrocław 2018	Not in the Top 4	
(England) Birmingham 2019	Not in the Top 4	
Total	x2 - x11 - x3	

== See also ==
- Swedish Squash Federation
- World Team Squash Championships
