= Dylan Bennett =

Dutch squash player (born 1984)

Personal information
- Born: 17 September 1984 (age 41) Eindhoven, Netherlands
- Height: 1.90 m (6 ft 3 in)
- Weight: 82 kg (181 lb)

Sport
- Country: Netherlands
- Turned pro: 1999
- Coached by: Sjef van der Heyden
- Retired: Active
- Racquet used: Dunlop

Men's singles
- Highest ranking: No. 43 (June 2007)
- Current ranking: No. 71 (December 2009)
- Updated on 23 December 2009

Dylan Bennett (born 17 September 1984 in Eindhoven) is a professional squash player who represents Netherlands. He reached a career-high world ranking of World No. 43 in June 2007.
