= European Squash Team Championships =

European Team Championships

Details
- Event name: European Team Championships
- Website [European Squash Federation]

Men's Winner
- Most recent champion(s): England (men's)
- Year: 2026

Women's Winner
- Most recent champion(s): England (women's)
- Year: 2026

The European Team Championships (ETC) are the international squash competition played between teams representing different nations organised by the European Squash Federation. Countries enter teams of four or five players to represent them in the championships. In each round of the competition, teams face each other in a best-of-four singles matches contest. Each competition is held once every year.

== Past results ==
=== Men's championship ===
| Year | Winner | Runner-up | Third | Fourth | Location | ref |
|---|---|---|---|---|---|---|
| 1973 | England | Scotland | (Republic of Ireland) Ireland | Wales | Edinburgh | |
| 1974 | England | Scotland | (Republic of Ireland) Ireland | Wales | Stockholm | |
| 1975 | England | Scotland | Sweden | (Republic of Ireland) Ireland | Dublin | |
| 1976 | England | Scotland | Sweden | (Republic of Ireland) Ireland | Brussels | |
| 1977 | England | Sweden | Scotland | (Republic of Ireland) Ireland | Sheffield | |
| 1978 | England | Sweden | Scotland | Finland | Amsterdam | |
| 1979 | England | Sweden | Scotland | (Republic of Ireland) Ireland | Hamburg | |
| 1980 | Sweden | England | Finland | Wales | Helsinki | |
| 1981 | England | Sweden | (Republic of Ireland) Ireland | Scotland | Amsterdam | |
| 1982 | England | Sweden | (Republic of Ireland) Ireland | Finland | Cardiff | |
| 1983 | Sweden | England | Wales | Netherlands | Munich | |
| 1984 | England | Sweden | Finland | (Republic of Ireland) Ireland | Dublin | |
| 1985 | England | Sweden | Finland | Netherlands | Barcelona | |
| 1986 | England | Sweden | Finland | West Germany | Aix-en-Provence | |
| 1987 | England | Sweden | Finland | West Germany | Vienna | |
| 1988 | England | Sweden | Finland | Wales | Warmond | |
| 1989 | England | Sweden | Finland | West Germany | Helsinki | |
| 1990 | England | West Germany | Finland | Sweden | Zürich | |
| 1991 | England | Finland | Germany | Netherlands | Gelsenkirchen | |
| 1992 | Scotland | Finland | England | Sweden | Aix-en-Provence | |
| 1993 | England | Germany | France | Sweden | Aix-en-Provence | |
| 1994 | England | Germany | Scotland | France | Zoetermeer | |
| 1995 | England | Finland | Sweden | Germany | Amsterdam | |
| 1996 | England | Scotland | Finland | Germany | Amsterdam | |
| 1997 | England | Wales | Finland | France | Odense | |
| 1998 | England | Finland | Wales | France | Helsinki | |
| 1999 | England | Scotland | Wales | Finland | Linz | |
| 2000 | England | France | Finland | Wales | Vienna | |
| 2001 | England | France | Finland | Wales | Eindhoven | |
| 2002 | England | France | Wales | Netherlands | Böblingen | |
| 2003 | England | France | Wales | Netherlands | Nottingham | |
| 2004 | England | France | Wales | Netherlands | Rennes | |
| 2005 | England | France | Netherlands | Wales | Amsterdam | |
| 2006 | England | France | Netherlands | Wales | Vienna | |
| 2007 | England | Netherlands | France | Wales | Riccione | |
| 2008 | England | France | Netherlands | Germany | Amsterdam | |
| 2009 | England | France | Wales | Netherlands | Malmö | |
| 2010 | England | France | Netherlands | Wales | Aix-en-Provence | |
| 2011 | England | France | Italy | Netherlands | Espoo | |
| 2012 | England | France | Germany | Scotland | Nuremberg | |
| 2013 | England | France | Germany | Scotland | Amsterdam | |
| 2014 | England | France | Germany | Scotland | Riccione | |
| 2015 | France | England | Germany | Scotland | Herning | |
| 2016 | England | France | Scotland | Germany | Warsaw | |
| 2017 | France | England | Germany | Scotland | Helsinki | |
| 2018 | France | England | Spain | Germany | Wrocław | |
| 2019 | England | Spain | Scotland | France | Birmingham | |
| 2020 & 2021 Cancelled due to COVID-19 pandemic in Europe. | | | | | | |
| 2022 | England | France | Scotland | Germany | Eindhoven | |
| 2023 | England | France | Switzerland | Wales | Helsinki | |
| 2024 | England | France | Switzerland | Wales | Uster | |
| 2025 | England | France | Switzerland | Germany | Wrocław | |
| 2026 | England | Switzerland | France | Germany | Amsterdam | |

=== Women's championship ===
| Year | Winner | Runner-up | Third | Fourth | Location | ref |
|---|---|---|---|---|---|---|
| 1978 | England | (Republic of Ireland) Ireland | Scotland | Wales | Amsterdam | |
| 1979 | England | (Republic of Ireland) Ireland | Scotland | Wales | Hamburg | |
| 1980 | England | (Republic of Ireland) Ireland | Scotland | Wales | Helsinki | |
| 1981 | England | (Republic of Ireland) Ireland | Wales | Scotland | Amsterdam | |
| 1982 | England | (Republic of Ireland) Ireland | Scotland | Wales | Cardiff | |
| 1983 | England | (Republic of Ireland) Ireland | Wales | Scotland | Munich | |
| 1984 | England | (Republic of Ireland) Ireland | Scotland | Wales | Dublin | |
| 1985 | England | (Republic of Ireland) Ireland | Scotland | Wales | Barcelona | |
| 1986 | England | (Republic of Ireland) Ireland | Scotland | Finland | Aix-en-Provence | |
| 1987 | England | (Republic of Ireland) Ireland | West Germany | Finland | Vienna | |
| 1988 | England | (Republic of Ireland) Ireland | West Germany | Wales | Warmond | |
| 1989 | England | (Republic of Ireland) Ireland | Netherlands | Sweden | Helsinki | |
| 1990 | England | Netherlands | Finland | (Republic of Ireland) Ireland | Zürich | |
| 1991 | England | Netherlands | Germany | Finland | Gelsenkirchen | |
| 1992 | England | Germany | Netherlands | (Republic of Ireland) Ireland | Aix-en-Provence | |
| 1993 | England | Netherlands | Germany | (Republic of Ireland) Ireland | Aix-en-Provence | |
| 1994 | England | Germany | Netherlands | (Republic of Ireland) Ireland | Zoetermeer | |
| 1995 | England | Netherlands | Scotland | Germany | Amsterdam | |
| 1996 | England | Germany | Netherlands | France | Amsterdam | |
| 1997 | England | Germany | Netherlands | Scotland | Odense | |
| 1998 | England | Germany | Netherlands | Scotland | Helsinki | |
| 1999 | England | Germany | Netherlands | Scotland | Linz | |
| 2000 | England | Germany | Scotland | Netherlands | Vienna | |
| 2001 | England | Denmark | Switzerland | Netherlands | Eindhoven | |
| 2002 | England | Scotland | Germany | Denmark | Böblingen | |
| 2003 | England | Netherlands | Scotland | Denmark | Nottingham | |
| 2004 | England | Netherlands | France | Belgium | Rennes | |
| 2005 | England | Netherlands | (Republic of Ireland) Ireland | Scotland | Amsterdam | |
| 2006 | England | Netherlands | Germany | France | Vienna | |
| 2007 | England | Netherlands | Denmark | Germany | Riccione | |
| 2008 | England | Netherlands | France | (Republic of Ireland) Ireland | Amsterdam | |
| 2009 | England | Netherlands | France | (Republic of Ireland) Ireland | Malmö | |
| 2010 | Netherlands | France | England | (Republic of Ireland) Ireland | Aix-en-Provence | |
| 2011 | England | Netherlands | (Republic of Ireland) Ireland | France | Espoo | |
| 2012 | England | (Republic of Ireland) Ireland | France | Germany | Nuremberg | |
| 2013 | England | (Republic of Ireland) Ireland | France | Netherlands | Amsterdam | |
| 2014 | England | France | Czech Republic | (Republic of Ireland) Ireland | Riccione | |
| 2015 | England | France | (Republic of Ireland) Ireland | Denmark | Herning | |
| 2016 | England | France | Netherlands | Wales | Warsaw | |
| 2017 | England | France | Wales | Netherlands | Helsinki | |
| 2018 | England | France | Belgium | Netherlands | Wrocław | |
| 2019 | France | England | Belgium | Scotland | Birmingham | |
| 2020 & 2021 Cancelled due to COVID-19 pandemic in Europe. | | | | | | |
| 2022 | England | Wales | Netherlands | France | Eindhoven | |
| 2023 | England | Belgium | Wales | France | Helsinki | |
| 2024 | Belgium | England | Wales | France | Uster | |
| 2025 | England | Belgium | France | Scotland | Wrocław | |
| 2026 | England | France | Belgium | Scotland | Amsterdam | |

== Medals summary ==
==== Men ====
| Rank | Nation | Gold | Silver | Bronze | Total |
|---|---|---|---|---|---|
| 1 | England | 46 | 5 | 1 | 52 |
| 2 | France | 3 | 19 | 3 | 25 |
| 3 | Sweden | 2 | 10 | 4 | 16 |
| 4 | Scotland | 1 | 7 | 6 | 14 |
| 5 | Finland | 0 | 4 | 12 | 16 |
| 6 | Germany | 0 | 3 | 6 | 9 |
| 7 | Wales | 0 | 1 | 7 | 8 |
| 8 | Netherlands | 0 | 1 | 4 | 5 |
| 9 | Switzerland | 0 | 1 | 3 | 4 |
| 10 | Spain | 0 | 1 | 1 | 2 |
| 11 | Ireland | 0 | 0 | 4 | 4 |
| 12 | Italy | 0 | 0 | 1 | 1 |
| Totals (12 entries) | | 52 | 52 | 52 | 156 |

==== Women ====
| Rank | Nation | Gold | Silver | Bronze | Total |
|---|---|---|---|---|---|
| 1 | England | 44 | 2 | 1 | 47 |
| 2 | Netherlands | 1 | 12 | 9 | 22 |
| 3 | France | 1 | 7 | 6 | 14 |
| 4 | Belgium | 1 | 2 | 3 | 6 |
| 5 | Ireland | 0 | 14 | 3 | 17 |
| 6 | Germany | 0 | 7 | 6 | 13 |
| 7 | Scotland | 0 | 1 | 10 | 11 |
| 8 | Wales | 0 | 1 | 5 | 6 |
| 9 | Denmark | 0 | 1 | 1 | 2 |
| 10 | Czech Republic | 0 | 0 | 1 | 1 |
| 10 | Finland | 0 | 0 | 1 | 1 |
| 10 | Switzerland | 0 | 0 | 1 | 1 |
| Totals (12 entries) | | 47 | 47 | 47 | 141 |

== See also ==
- World Squash Team Championships
- WSF World Team Squash Championships
- European Squash Individual Championships
- World Team Squash Championships
