= Germany women's national squash team =

Germany
- Coach: Uwe Peters
- Association: Deutscher Squash Verband
- Colors: White or Black

World Team Championships
- First year: 1981
- Best finish: 4th
- Entries: 16

The Germany women's national squash team represents Germany in international squash team competitions, and is governed by German Squash Association.

Since 1981, Germany has participated in two Semi finals of the World Squash Team Open.

== Current team ==
- Sina Wall
- Sharon Sinclair
- Franziska Hennes
- Saskia Beinhard

== Results ==
=== World Team Squash Championships ===
Year	Result	Position	W	L
(England) Birmingham 1979	Did not present			
(Canada) Toronto 1981	Group Stage	13th	1	6
(Australia) Perth 1983	Did not present			
(Republic of Ireland) Dublin 1985	Group Stage	13th	1	5
(New Zealand) Auckland 1987	Group Stage	7th	4	4
(Netherlands) Warmond 1989	Semi Final	4th	1	5
(Australia) Sydney 1990	Semi Final	4th	2	3
(Canada) Vancouver 1992	Quarter Final	7th	3	3
(England) Guernsey 1994	Group Stage	6th	3	3
(Malaysia) Petaling Jaya 1996	Quarter Final	5th	3	3
(Germany) Stuttgart 1998	Quarter Final	5th	3	3
(England) Sheffield 2000	Quarter Final	6th	4	2
(Denmark) Odense 2002	Group Stage	10th	3	3
(Netherlands) Amsterdam 2004	Group Stage	17th	2	4
(Canada) Edmonton 2006	Group Stage	12th	1	5
(Egypt) Cairo 2008	Group Stage	13th	2	4
(New Zealand) Palmerston North 2010	Did not present			
(France) Nîmes 2012	Group Stage	19th	3	4
(Canada) Niagara-on-the-Lake 2014	Group Stage	15th	2	6
(France) Issy-les-Moulineaux 2016	Group Stage	14th	2	5
Total	17/20	0 Title	40	71

Note : Was West Germany until 1990

== See also ==
- Deutscher Squash Verband
- World Team Squash Championships
- Germany men's national squash team
