= Coline Aumard =

French squash player (born 1989)

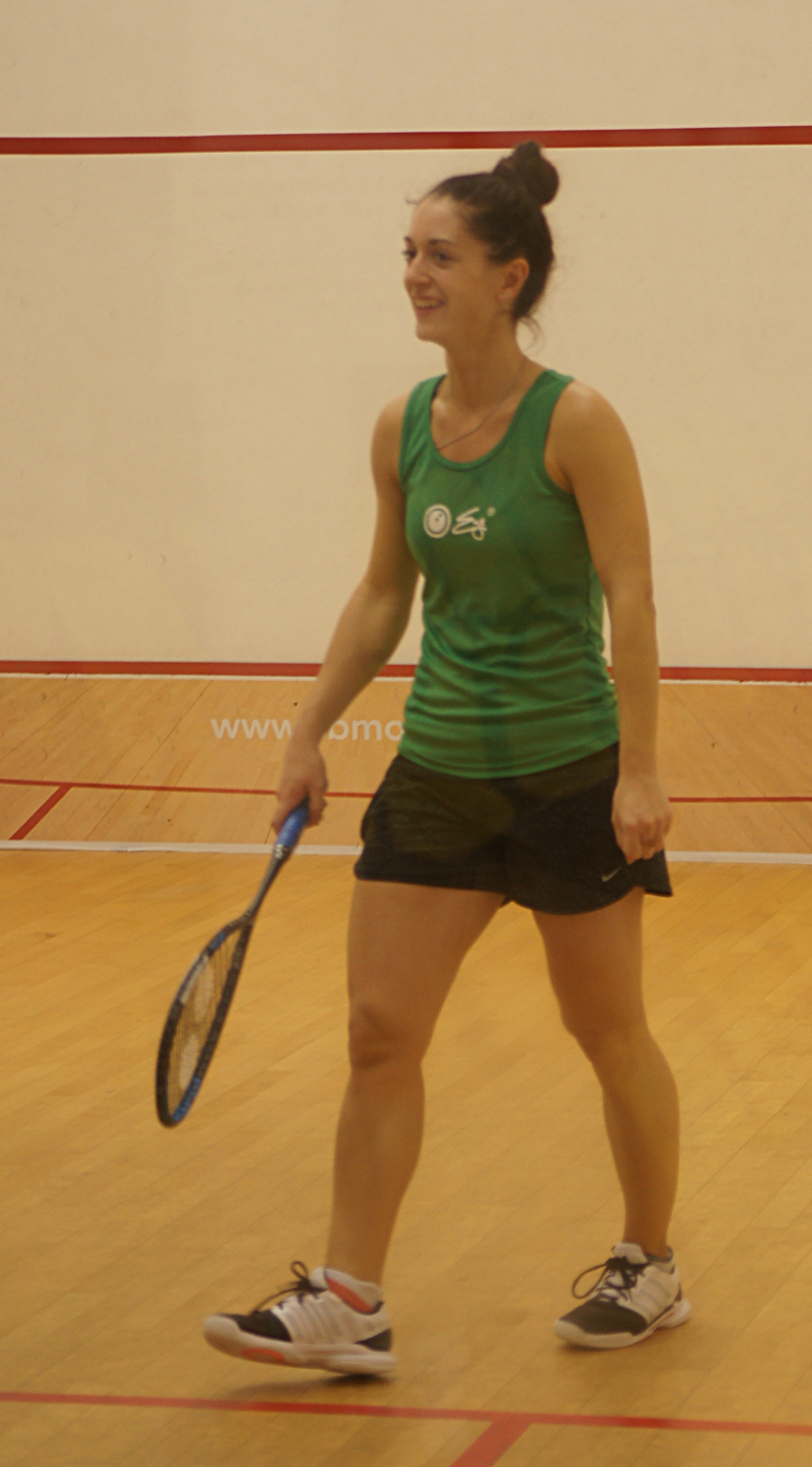
- Coline Aumard, Monte-Carlo squash classic 2015

Personal information
- Born: 13 June 1989 (age 37) Villeneuve-Saint-Georges, Paris, France
- Years active: 13

Sport
- Country: France
- Handedness: Right Handed
- Turned pro: 2007
- Coached by: Philippe Signoret
- Retired: Active
- Racquet used: Harrow

Women's singles
- Highest ranking: No. 20 (July 2020)
- Current ranking: No. 23 (November 2020)
- Title: 6
- Tour final: 10
Medal record
Women's squash
Representing France
World Games
Bronze medal – third place	2022 Birmingham	Individual
World Team Championships
Bronze medal – third place	2016 Issy-les-Moulineaux	Team
Bronze medal – third place	2018 Dalian	Team
- Updated on July 2017

Coline Aumard (born 13 June 1989 in Villeneuve-Saint-Georges, Paris) is a professional squash player who represents France. She reached a career-high world ranking of World No. 20 in July 2020.

== Career ==
In 2016, she was part of the French team that won the bronze medal at the 2016 Women's World Team Squash Championships in her home country. Two years later in 2018, she won her second bronze medal as part of the French team at the 2018 Women's World Team Squash Championships.
