= Ireland women's national squash team =

Ireland
- Coach: Elvy D’Costa
- Association: Irish Squash Federation
- Colors: Black

World Team Championships
- First year: 1979
- Titles: 0
- Runners-up: 0
- Best finish: 3rd
- Entries: 19

The Ireland women's national squash team represents Ireland in international squash team competitions, and is governed by Irish Squash Federation.

Since 1967, Ireland has won one Bronze medal of the World Squash Team Open, in 1979.

== Current team (2026) ==
Name	World Ranking	Age	Height
Hannah Craig	Ranked 60th	27	163cm
Breanne Flynn	Ranked 92nd	29	182cm
Sarah Sabry	—	19	—
Aimee McConnell	Ranked 424th	22	169cm
Lydia McQuillan	—	20	170cm

== Olympic Games ==
Ireland plans to send a Squash team to the 2028 Olympic Games in Los Angeles.

== Results ==
=== World Team Squash Championships ===
Year	Result	Position	W	L
(England) Birmingham 1979	Semi Final	3rd	2	2
(Canada) Toronto 1981	Quarter Final	5th	5	3
(Australia) Perth 1983	Semi Final	4th	3	3
(Republic of Ireland) Dublin 1985	Semi Final	4th	4	3
(New Zealand) Auckland 1987	Semi Final	4th	5	3
(Netherlands) Warmond 1989	Quarter Final	5th	4	2
(Australia) Sydney 1990	Group Stage	5th	4	2
(Canada) Vancouver 1992	Group Stage	10th	2	4
(England) Guernsey 1994	Group Stage	9th	4	2
(Malaysia) Petaling Jaya 1996	Group Stage	16th	1	5
(Germany) Stuttgart 1998	Group Stage	14th	2	4
(England) Sheffield 2000	Round of 16	15th	1	5
(Denmark) Odense 2002	Group Stage	12th	1	5
(Netherlands) Amsterdam 2004	Quarter Final	7th	4	3
(Canada) Edmonton 2006	Quarter Final	7th	3	3
(Egypt) Cairo 2008	Quarter Final	5th	5	2
(New Zealand) Palmerston North 2010	Quarter Final	8th	2	4
(France) Nîmes 2012	Quarter Final	6th	3	3
(Canada) Niagara-on-the-Lake 2014	Quarter Final	8th	3	4
Total	19/19	0 Title	58	62

== See also ==
- Squash Ireland
- World Team Squash Championships
- Ireland men's national squash team
