= France women's national squash team =

France
- Coach: Philippe Signoret
- Association: French Squash Federation
- Colors: Blue

World Team Championships
- First year: 1987
- Titles: 0
- Runners-up: 0
- Best finish: 6th
- Entries: 15

The France women's national squash team represents France in international squash team competitions, and is governed by the French Squash Federation.

Since 1987, France has participated in five quarter finals of the World Squash Team Open.

== Current team ==
- Camille Serme
- Coline Aumard
- Mélissa Alves
- Énora Villard

== Results ==
=== World Team Squash Championships ===
Year	Result	Position	W	L
(England) Birmingham 1979	Did not present			
(Canada) Toronto 1981	Did not present			
(Australia) Perth 1983	Did not present			
(Republic of Ireland) Dublin 1985	Did not present			
(New Zealand) Auckland 1987	Group Stage	11th	3	5
(Netherlands) Warmond 1989	Group Stage	10th	4	1
(Australia) Sydney 1990	Group Stage	9th	4	2
(Canada) Vancouver 1992	Group Stage	12th	2	4
(England) Guernsey 1994	Group Stage	10th	3	3
(Malaysia) Petaling Jaya 1996	Group Stage	10th	4	2
(Germany) Stuttgart 1998	Quarter Final	7th	4	2
(England) Sheffield 2000	Quarter Final	8th	2	4
(Denmark) Odense 2002	Group Stage	13th	4	3
(Netherlands) Amsterdam 2004	Group Stage	16th	0	6
(Canada) Edmonton 2006	Quarter Final	8th	2	4
(Egypt) Cairo 2008	Group Stage	11th	4	3
(New Zealand) Palmerston North 2010	Quarter Final	6th	3	3
(France) Nîmes 2012	Round of 16	9th	5	1
(Canada) Niagara-on-the-Lake 2014	Quarter Final	6th	4	3
(France) Issy-les-Moulineaux 2016	Semi Final	3rd	6	1
Total	16/20	0 Title	54	46

== See also ==
- French Squash Federation
- World Team Squash Championships
- France men's national squash team
