= Germany men's national squash team =

Germany
- Coach: Oliver Pettke
- Association: Deutscher Squash Verband
- Colors: White or Black

World Team Championships
- First year: 1981
- Titles: 0
- Runners-up: 0
- Best finish: 5th
- Entries: 16

European Team Championships
- Titles: 0
- Runners-up: 3
- Best finish: 2nd

The Germany men's national squash team represents Germany in international squash team competitions, and is governed by German Squash Association.

Since 1981, Germany has participated in one quarter final of the World Squash Team Open, in 2013.

== Current team ==
- Simon Rösner
- Raphael Kandra
- Jens Schoor
- Andre Haschker
- Rudi Rohrmüller

== Results ==
=== World Team Squash Championships ===
Year	Result	Position	W	L
(Australia) Melbourne 1967	Did not present			
(England) The Midlands 1969	Did not present			
New Zealand 1971	Did not present			
(South Africa) Johannesburg 1973	Did not present			
(England) The Midlands 1976	Did not present			
(Canada) Toronto & Ottawa 1977	Did not present			
(Australia) Brisbane 1979	Did not present			
(Sweden) Stockholm 1981	Group Stage	16th	2	5
(New Zealand) Auckland 1983	Did not present			
(Egypt) Cairo 1985	Group Stage	8th	3	6
(England) London 1987	Group Stage	14th	4	4
Singapore 1989	Group Stage	10th	5	2
(Finland) Helsinki 1991	Group Stage	10th	4	2
(Pakistan) Karachi 1993	Group Stage	8th	4	2
(Egypt) Cairo 1995	Group Stage	10th	3	3
(Malaysia) Petaling Jaya 1997	Group Stage	9th	3	3
(Egypt) Cairo 1999	Group Stage	10th	3	3
(Australia) Melbourne 2001	Round of 16	15th	2	5
(Austria) Vienna 2003	Round of 16	15th	3	4
(Pakistan) Islamabad 2005	Round of 16	10th	3	3
(India) Chennai 2007	Round of 16	16th	2	5
(Denmark) Odense 2009	Round of 16	11th	4	3
(Germany) Paderborn 2011	Round of 16	8th	5	2
(France) Mulhouse 2013	Quarter Final	5th	6	1
(Egypt) Cairo 2015	Cancelled			
(France) Marseille 2017	Round of 16	9th	5	1
(United States) Washington, D.C. 2019	Quarter Final	6th	4	3
Total	18/26	0 Title	65	57

=== European Squash Team Championships ===
Year	Result	Position
(Scotland) Edinburgh 1973	Not in the Top 4	
(Sweden) Stockholm 1974	Not in the Top 4	
(Republic of Ireland) Dublin 1975	Not in the Top 4	
(Belgium) Brussels 1976	Not in the Top 4	
(England) Sheffield 1977	Not in the Top 4	
(Netherlands) Amsterdam 1978	Not in the Top 4	
(Germany) Hamburg 1979	Not in the Top 4	
(Finland) Helsinki 1980	Not in the Top 4	
(Netherlands) Amsterdam 1981	Not in the Top 4	
(Wales) Cardiff 1982	Not in the Top 4	
(Germany) Munich 1983	Not in the Top 4	
(Republic of Ireland) Dublin 1984	Not in the Top 4	
(Spain) Barcelona 1985	Semi Final	4th
(France) Aix-en-Provence 1986	Semi Final	4th
(Austria) Vienna 1987	Not in the Top 4	
(Netherlands) Warmond 1988	Semi Final	4th
(Finland) Helsinki 1989	Not in the Top 4	
(Switzerland) Zürich 1990	Final	2nd
(Germany) Gelsenkirchen 1991	Semi Final	3rd
(France) Aix-en-Provence 1992	Not in the Top 4	
(France) Aix-en-Provence 1993	Final	2nd
(Germany) Zoetermeer 1994	Final	2nd
(Netherlands) Amsterdam 1995	Semi Final	4th
(Netherlands) Amsterdam 1996	Semi Final	4th
(Denmark) Odense 1997	Not in the Top 4	
(Finland) Helsinki 1998	Not in the Top 4	
(Austria) Linz 1999	Not in the Top 4	
(Austria) Vienna 2000	Not in the Top 4	
(Netherlands) Eindhoven 2001	Not in the Top 4	
(Germany) Böblingen 2002	Not in the Top 4	
(England) Nottingham 2003	Not in the Top 4	
(France) Rennes 2004	Not in the Top 4	
(Netherlands) Amsterdam 2005	Not in the Top 4	
(Austria) Vienna 2006	Not in the Top 4	
(Italy) Riccione 2007	Not in the Top 4	
(Netherlands) Amsterdam 2008	Semi Final	4th
(Sweden) Malmö 2009	Not in the Top 4	
(France) Aix-en-Provence 2010	Not in the Top 4	
(Finland) Espoo 2011	Not in the Top 4	
(Germany) Nuremberg 2012	Semi Final	3rd
(Netherlands) Amsterdam 2013	Semi Final	3rd
(Italy) Riccione 2014	Semi Final	3rd
(Denmark) Herning 2015	Semi Final	3rd
(Poland) Warsaw 2016	Semi Final	4th
(Finland) Helsinki 2017	Semi Final	3rd
(Poland) Wrocław 2018	Semi Final	4th
(England) Birmingham 2019	Not in the Top 4	
Total	x3 - x6	

Note : Was West Germany until 1990

== See also ==
- Deutscher Squash Verband
- World Team Squash Championships
