= 1999 Women's World Open Squash Championship =

Women's World Open 1999
- 16th WISPA World Squash Championship
- Location: Seattle, United States
- Date: October 16–24, 1999

WISPA World Tour
- Category: World Open
- Prize money: $80,000

Results
- Champion: (England) Cassie Campion
- Runner-up: (Australia) Michelle Martin
- Semi-finalists: (New Zealand) Leilani Joyce (England) Natalie Grainger

The 1999 Women's World Open Squash Championship was the women's edition of the 1999 World Open, which serves as the individual world championship for squash players. The event took place in Seattle in the United States from 16 October until 24 October 1999. Cassie Campion won the World Open title, defeating Michelle Martin in the final.

== Seeds ==
1. (Australia) Michelle Martin (final)
2. (New Zealand) Leilani Joyce (semifinals)
3. (England) Natalie Grainger (semifinals)
4. (England) Cassie Campion (champion)
5. (England) Suzanne Horner (quarterfinals)
6. (England) Linda Charman (quarterfinals)
7. unknown
8. (Germany) Sabine Schoene (second round)
9. (Australia) Carol Owens (quarterfinals)
10. (England) Fiona Geaves (second round)
11. (England) Stephanie Brind (second round)
12. (England) Rebecca Macree (second round)
13. (South Africa) Claire Nitch (first round)
14. (Australia) Liz Irving (second round)
15. (England) Jenny Tranfield (second round)
16. (Netherlands) Vanessa Atkinson (second round)

== Draw & results ==
First round
1	(Australia) Michelle Martin	9	9	9
(Canada) Melanie Jans	0	1	1
11	(England) Stephanie Brind	9	5	9	9
(Scotland) Pamela Nimmo	4	9	1	4
9	(Australia) Carol Owens	9	5	9	9
(Egypt) Maha Zein	0	4	4
14	(Australia) Liz Irving	4	3	9
(United States) Shabana Khan	2	2	6
3	(England) Natalie Grainger	10	9	9
(Australia) Kym Keevil	9	5	3
12	(England) Rebecca Macree	9	6	10	1	9
(England) Janie Thacker	6	9	8	9	5
6	(England) Linda Charman	9	10	9
(Wales) Tegwen Malik	5	8	4
(Australia) Rachael Grinham	7	9	9	8	9
(Canada) Marnie Baizley	9	6	3	10	2
4	(England) Cassie Campion	9	9	9
(England) Kate Major	1	0	0
16	(Netherlands) Vanessa Atkinson	9	9	9
(New Zealand) Shelley Kitchen	2	0	5
5	(England) Suzanne Horner	9	9	7	9
(England) Vicky Botwright	7	3	9	3
10	(England) Fiona Geaves	9	9	9
(Egypt) Salma Shabana	1	3	2
2	(New Zealand) Leilani Joyce	9	9	9
(Wales) Karen Hargreaves	0	5	0
15	(England) Jenny Tranfield	9	9	9
(Australia) Melissa Vacca	0	0	3
(England) Tania Bailey	9	9	9	9
13	(South Africa) Claire Nitch	10	7	5	1
8	(Germany) Sabine Schoene	9	5	9	4	9
(United States) Latasha Khan	1	9	3	9	4

Second round
1	(Australia) Michelle Martin	9	9	9
11	(England) Stephanie Brind	6	5	2
9	(Australia) Carol Owens	9	9	9
14	(Australia) Liz Irving	2	1	1
3	(England) Natalie Grainger	9	9	9
12	(England) Rebecca Macree	5	1	3
6	(England) Linda Charman	9	9	9
(Australia) Rachael Grinham	5	6	2
4	(England) Cassie Campion	9	9	9
16	(Netherlands) Vanessa Atkinson	2	1	6
5	(England) Suzanne Horner	10	9	9
10	(England) Fiona Geaves	9	6	6
2	(New Zealand) Leilani Joyce	9	9	9
15	(England) Jenny Tranfield	3	1	5
(England) Tania Bailey	10	9	10
8	(Germany) Sabine Schoene	9	1	9

Quarter-finals
1	(Australia) Michelle Martin	6	10	5	9	9
9	(Australia) Carol Owens	9	9	9	3	3
3	(England) Natalie Grainger	9	9	9
6	(England) Linda Charman	1	1	1
4	(England) Cassie Campion	9	9	9
5	(England) Suzanne Horner	4	0	1
2	(New Zealand) Leilani Joyce	9	9	9
(England) Tania Bailey	2	4	4

Semi-finals
1	(Australia) Michelle Martin	10	9	9
3	(England) Natalie Grainger	7	0	6
Final
1	(Australia) Michelle Martin	6	7	7
4	(England) Cassie Campion	9	9	9
4	(England) Cassie Campion	9	9	9
2	(New Zealand) Leilani Joyce	6	3	3

=== Notes ===
Cassie Campion was formerly Cassie Jackman.
Sarah Fitzgerald was unable to defend her title due to injury.

== See also ==
- World Open
- 1999 Men's World Open Squash Championship

Preceded by Stuttgart (Germany); 1998	World Open; Seattle (United States); 1999	Succeeded by Edinburgh (Scotland); 2000
