= 1998 Women's World Open Squash Championship =

Women's World Open 1998
- 15th WISPA World Squash Championship
- Location: Stuttgart, Germany
- Date: November 2–8, 1998

WISPA World Tour
- Category: World Open
- Prize money: $70,000

Results
- Champion: (Australia) Sarah Fitzgerald
- Runner-up: (Australia) Michelle Martin
- Semi-finalists: (England) Sue Wright (England) Suzanne Horner

The 1998 Women's World Open Squash Championship was the women's edition of the 1998 World Open, which serves as the individual world championship for squash players. The event took place in Stuttgart in Germany in November 1998. Sarah Fitzgerald won her third World Open title, defeating Michelle Martin in a repeat of the 1997 final.

== Seeds ==
1. (Australia) Sarah Fitzgerald (champion)
2. (Australia) Michelle Martin (final)
3. (England) Sue Wright (semifinals)
4. (England) Suzanne Horner (semifinals)
5. (Australia) Carol Owens (quarterfinals)
6. (Germany) Sabine Schoene (second round)
7. (New Zealand) Leilani Joyce (quarterfinals)
8. (England) Linda Charman (first round)
9. (Australia) Liz Irving (second round)
10. (England) Fiona Geaves (second round)
11. (South Africa) Claire Nitch (second round)
12. (New Zealand) Philippa Beams (second round)
13. (England) Jane Martin (second round)
14. (South Africa) Natalie Grainger (quarterfinals)
15. (England) Rebecca Macree (second round)
16. (England) Jenny Tranfield (first round)

== Qualifying round ==
Player One	Player Two	Score
(Scotland) Pamela Nimmo	(Finland) Kia Paasivirta	9/2 9/2 9/7
(England) Tania Bailey	(Australia) Narelle Tippett	9/2 6/9 9/5 9/4
(Egypt) Maha Zein	(England) Vicky Botwright	9/5 3/9 10/8 9/0
(Germany) Sabine Baum	(Australia) Melissa Vacca	9/2 9/3 9/4
(New Zealand) Sarah Cook	(Scotland) Helen Macfie	9/1 9/2 9/2
(Germany) Daniela Grzenia	(Germany) Ina Meine	1/9 9/4 9/1 9/5
(Canada) Melanie Jans	(Egypt) Salma Shabana	9/0 9/7 5/9 2/9 9/4
(Wales) Karen Hargreaves	(Belgium) Kim Hannes	9/6 9/5 9/2

== Draw and results ==
First round
1	(Australia) Sarah Fitzgerald	10	9	9
(England) Tracey Shenton	8	2	4
Q	(England) Tania Bailey	0	2	9	9	9
16	(England) Jenny Tranfield	9	9	6	4	5
14	(South Africa) Natalie Grainger	9	5	9	9
(Australia) Rachael Grinham	3	9	3	7
6	(Germany) Sabine Schoene	4	3	9	9	9
Q	(New Zealand) Sarah Cook	9	9	7	1	7
3	(England) Sue Wright	10	9	9
(Australia) Natarsha Tippett	2	1	0
12	(New Zealand) Philippa Beams	9	3	9	9
(Egypt) Maha Zein	5	9	3	5
5	(Australia) Carol Owens	10	9	9
Q	(Germany) Sabine Baum	8	2	4
15	(England) Rebecca Macree	8	0	9	9	9
(Netherlands) Vanessa Atkinson	10	9	7	7	0
2	(Australia) Michelle Martin	9	9	9
(Scotland) Senga Macfie	0	0	0
10	(England) Fiona Geaves	9	9	5	9
Q	(Canada) Melanie Jans	6	1	9	6
7	(New Zealand) Leilani Joyce	9	9	9
(Wales) Tegwen Malik	4	5	1
13	(England) Jane Martin	9	9	9
Q	(Scotland) Pamela Nimmo	2	0	2
4	(England) Suzanne Horner	4	9	9	9
(Australia) Kate Major	9	6	7	1
9	(Australia) Liz Irving	9	9	9
Q	(Wales) Karen Hargreaves	1	0	4
(England) Stephanie Brind	10	9	9
8	(England) Linda Charman	8	3	3
11	(South Africa) Claire Nitch	9	9	9
Q	(Germany) Daniela Grzenia	6	1	4

Second round
1	(Australia) Sarah Fitzgerald	9	9	9
Q	(England) Tania Bailey	4	0	3
14	(South Africa) Natalie Grainger	9	9	9
6	(Germany) Sabine Schoene	4	0	3
3	(England) Sue Wright	9	9	9
12	(New Zealand) Philippa Beams	3	3	2
5	(Australia) Carol Owens	9	9	9
15	(England) Rebecca Macree	5	3	4
2	(Australia) Michelle Martin	9	9	8	9
10	(England) Fiona Geaves	4	3	9	3
7	(New Zealand) Leilani Joyce	9	2	9	9
13	(England) Jane Martin	2	9	2	4
4	(England) Suzanne Horner	9	9	7	9
9	(Australia) Liz Irving	2	0	9	6
(England) Stephanie Brind	9	9	4	9
11	(South Africa) Claire Nitch	4	1	9	1

Quarter-finals
1	(Australia) Sarah Fitzgerald	9	9	9
14	(South Africa) Natalie Grainger	4	7	4
3	(England) Sue Wright	4	7	9	9	9
5	(Australia) Carol Owens	9	9	6	7	3
2	(Australia) Michelle Martin	9	9	9	9
7	(New Zealand) Leilani Joyce	7	1	10	5
4	(England) Suzanne Horner	9	2	7	9	9
(England) Stephanie Brind	7	9	9	5	1

Semi-finals
1	(Australia) Sarah Fitzgerald	10	9	9
3	(England) Sue Wright	9	4	2
Final
1	(Australia) Sarah Fitzgerald	10	9	2	3	10
2	(Australia) Michelle Martin	8	7	9	9	9
2	(Australia) Michelle Martin	9	9	9
4	(England) Suzanne Horner	3	0	5

== See also ==
- World Open
- 1998 Men's World Open Squash Championship

Preceded by Sydney (Australia); 1997	World Open; Stuttgart (Germany); 1998	Succeeded by Seattle (United States); 1999
