= 1996 Women's World Open Squash Championship =

Women's World Open 1996
- 13th WISPA World Squash Championship
- Location: Malaysia
- Date: October 9–13, 1996

WISPA World Tour
- Category: World Open

Results
- Champion: (Australia) Sarah Fitzgerald
- Runner-up: (England) Cassie Jackman
- Semi-finalists: (England) Sue Wright (Australia) Liz Irving

The 1996 Women's Perrier World Open Squash Championship was the women's edition of the 1996 World Open, which serves as the individual world championship for squash players. The event took place in Petaling Jaya, Kuala Lumpur in Malaysia between 9 October and 13 October 1996. Sarah Fitzgerald won her first World Open title, defeating Cassie Jackman in the final.

== Seeds ==
1. (Australia) Michelle Martin (quarterfinals)
2. (Australia) Sarah Fitzgerald (champion)
3. (England) Suzanne Horner (quarterfinals)
4. (England) Cassie Jackman (final)
5. (Australia) Liz Irving (semifinals)
6. (Australia) Carol Owens (quarterfinals)
7. (England) Sue Wright (semifinals)
8. (Germany) Sabine Schoene (quarterfinals)
9. (England) Fiona Geaves (second round)
10. (New Zealand) Philippa Beams (second round)
11. (South Africa) Claire Nitch (second round)
12. (Australia) Robyn Cooper (second round)
13. (England) Rebecca Macree (first round)
14. (New Zealand) Leilani Marsh (second round)
15. (England) Linda Charman (second round)
16. (Australia) Meeghan Bell (second round)

== Draw and results ==
First round
1	(Australia) Michelle Martin	9	9	9
(Germany) Sabine Baum	1	3	4
13	(England) Rebecca Macree	4	7	10	9	6
(England) Tracey Shenton	9	9	8	6	9
5	(Australia) Liz Irving	9	9	9
(Australia) Narelle Tippett	2	5	3
(Australia) Vicki Cardwell	9	0	1	2
16	(Australia) Meeghan Bell	4	9	9	9
4	(England) Cassie Jackman	9	9	3	9
(Australia) Toni Weeks	0	5	9	5
11	(South Africa) Claire Nitch	9	9	3	9
(Egypt) Salma Shabana	3	5	9	3
8	(Germany) Sabine Schoene	7	9	9	9
(New Zealand) Sarah Cook	9	5	3	3
14	(New Zealand) Leilani Marsh	9	9	9
(Netherlands) Vanessa Atkinson	1	7	5
2	(Australia) Sarah Fitzgerald	9	9	9
(South Africa) Carla Venter	1	1	0
10	(New Zealand) Philippa Beams	9	9	9
(Australia) Natarsha Tippett	2	3	0
6	(Australia) Carol Owens	9	9	9
(Germany) Silke Bartel	3	3	5
15	(England) Linda Charman	5	9	9	9
(Australia) Danielle Drady-Harte	9	0	1	0
7	(England) Sue Wright	2	9	9	9
(New Zealand) Jade Wilson	9	5	1	0
9	(England) Fiona Geaves	4	9	9	9
(United States) Demer Holleran	9	3	4	4
3	(England) Suzanne Horner	4	9	9	9
(Australia) Rachael Grinham	9	6	2	1
12	(Australia) Robyn Cooper	9	9	9
(United States) Ellie Pierce	1	0	0

Second round
1	(Australia) Michelle Martin	9	9	9
(England) Tracey Shenton	1	0	0
5	(Australia) Liz Irving	9	9	9
16	(Australia) Meeghan Bell	3	3	6
4	(England) Cassie Jackman	9	9	9
11	(South Africa) Claire Nitch	3	5	0
8	(Germany) Sabine Schoene	10	2	9	7	9
14	(New Zealand) Leilani Marsh	8	9	5	9	2
2	(Australia) Sarah Fitzgerald	9	9	9
10	(New Zealand) Philippa Beams	3	3	2
6	(Australia) Carol Owens	9	9	9
15	(England) Linda Charman	4	1	5
7	(England) Sue Wright	6	9	9	9
9	(England) Fiona Geaves	9	2	1	0
3	(England) Suzanne Horner	9	4	10	9
12	(Australia) Robyn Cooper	6	9	9	4

Quarter-finals
1	(Australia) Michelle Martin	9	9	5	5
5	(Australia) Liz Irving	4	10	9	9
4	(England) Cassie Jackman	9	9	9
8	(Germany) Sabine Schoene	2	2	4
2	(Australia) Sarah Fitzgerald	9	9	9
6	(Australia) Carol Owens	2	1	1
7	(England) Sue Wright	9	9	9
3	(England) Suzanne Horner	4	0	4

Semi-finals
5	(Australia) Liz Irving	5	6	9	8
4	(England) Cassie Jackman	9	9	4	10
Final
4	(England) Cassie Jackman	0	3	4
2	(Australia) Sarah Fitzgerald	9	9	9
2	(Australia) Sarah Fitzgerald	9	8	9
7	(England) Sue Wright	3	4	1

== See also ==
- World Open
- 1996 Men's World Open Squash Championship

Preceded by Hong Kong; 1995	World Open; Petaling Jaya (Malaysia); 1996	Succeeded by Sydney (Australia); 1997
