= 2001 Women's World Open Squash Championship =

Women's World Open 2001
- 18th WISPA World Squash Championship
- Location: Melbourne, Australia
- Date: October 11–19, 2001

WISPA World Tour
- Category: World Open
- Prize money: $69,000

Results
- Champion: (Australia) Sarah Fitzgerald
- Runner-up: (New Zealand) Leilani Joyce
- Semi-finalists: (New Zealand) Carol Owens (England) Linda Charman-Smith

The 2001 Women's World Open Squash Championship was the women's edition of the 2001 World Open, which serves as the individual world championship for squash players. The event took place in Melbourne in Australia from 11 October until 19 October 2001. Sarah Fitzgerald won her fourth World Open title, defeating Leilani Joyce in the final.

== Seeds ==
1. (New Zealand) Leilani Joyce (final)
2. (New Zealand) Carol Owens (semifinals)
3. (Australia) Sarah Fitzgerald (champion)
4. (England) Linda Charman-Smith (semifinals)
5. (England) Fiona Geaves (quarterfinals)
6. (England) Stephanie Brind (quarterfinals)
7. (England) Suzanne Horner (quarterfinals)
8. (Australia) Rachael Grinham (second round)
9. (Netherlands) Vanessa Atkinson (second round)
10. (England) Rebecca Macree (second round)
11. (England) Cassie Campion (quarterfinals)
12. (Scotland) Pamela Nimmo (second round)
13. (England) Vicky Botwright (second round)
14. (New Zealand) Shelley Kitchen (second round)
15. (Australia) Natalie Grinham (second round)
16. (Egypt) Maha Zein (first round)

== First qualifying round (12 Oct) ==
Player One	Player Two	Score
(Egypt) Eman El Amir	(Australia) Karen Morrissey	9-4 9-7 6-9 5-9 9-5
(New Zealand) Lara Petera	(Canada) Runa Reta	9-3 9-7 7-9 9-4
(Malaysia) Christina Mak	(Australia) Karen Kronemeyer	9-7 8-10 9-7 9-2
(France) Isabelle Stoehr	(Australia) Amelia Pittock	9-2 9-0 9-0
(Egypt) Engy Kheirallah	(Papua New Guinea) Naluge Guy	9-5 9-3 9-2
(Malaysia) Tricia Chuah	(Slovenia) Petra Vihar	9-2 9-0 9-0
(Australia) Laura Keating	(Australia) Sally Hunt	9-2 9-5 9-2
(Scotland) Senga Macfie	(England) Jenny Duncalf	9-2 9-4 9-0
(Hong Kong) Rebecca Chiu	(Australia) Lisa Camilleri	9-1 9-7 9-1
(Belgium) Katline Cauwels	(Australia) Georgina Davis	3-9 9-2 9-0 9-1
(Malaysia) Sharon Wee	(Japan) Mami Nishio	9-1 9-7 9-2
(England) Dominique Lloyd-Walter	(England) Helen Easton	9-2 9-0 9-7
(Scotland) Wendy Maitland	(Australia) Shannon McNamara	3-9, 9-1, 4-9, 10-9, 9-5
(Belgium) Kim Hannes	(Australia) Heidi Mather	9-7, 9-2, 9-2
(United States) Shabana Khan	(Japan) Eri Tsuchida	3-9, 9-5, 9-4, 9-3
(Australia) Dianne Desira	(England) Vicky Lankester	9-5, 9-6, 6-9, 9-7

== Final Qualifying round (13 Oct) ==
Player One	Player Two	Score
(Hong Kong) Rebecca Chiu	(Belgium) Katline Cauwels	9/6 9/2 10/8
(Malaysia) Sharon Wee	(England) Dominique Lloyd-Walter	9/7 0/9 9/4 9/3
(Belgium) Kim Hannes	(Scotland) Wendy Maitland	6/9 10/8 0/9 10/9 9/4
(United States) Shabana Khan	(Australia) Dianne Desira	0/9, 9/4, 4/9, 10/9, 9/4
(New Zealand) Lara Petra	(Egypt) Eman El Amir	9/1 9/2 9/3
(France) Isabelle Stoehr	(Hong Kong) Christina Mak	9/7 9/2 9/6
(Scotland) Senga Macfie	(Australia) Laura Keating	9/5 9/5 9/4
(Egypt) Engy Kheirallah	(Malaysia) Trishia Chuah	9/5, 8/10, 9/2, 9/2

== Main draw ==
First round
1	(New Zealand) Leilani Joyce	9	9	9
(New Zealand) Lara Petera	1	4	4
13	(England) Vicky Botwright	9	9	7	9
(United States) Latasha Khan	7	7	9	5
5	(England) Fiona Geaves	9	9	4	9
(Egypt) Omneya Abdel Kawy	2	4	9	5
15	(Australia) Natalie Grinham	9	9	10
(Australia) Liz Irving	4	2	8
4	(England) Linda Charman-Smith	9	9	9
(Egypt) Engy Kheirallah	1	2	5
(Malaysia) Nicol David	4	9	9	9
16	(Egypt) Maha Zein	9	5	7	1
6	(England) Stephanie Brind	9	10	9
(Scotland) Senga Macfie	1	1	7
14	(New Zealand) Shelley Kitchen	9	9	1	9
(England) Janie Thacker	3	4	9	4
2	(New Zealand) Carol Owens	9	9	9
(Belgium) Kim Hannes	0	0	2
10	(England) Rebecca Macree	9	9	9
(Hong Kong) Rebecca Chiu	6	7	7
11	(England) Cassie Campion	9	9	9
(Republic of Ireland) Madeline Perry	0	4	0
8	(Australia) Rachael Grinham	9	9	9
(Malaysia) Sharon Wee	0	4	2
3	(Australia) Sarah Fitzgerald	9	9	9
(France) Isabelle Stoehr	1	4	0
9	(Netherlands) Vanessa Atkinson	9	4	6	9	9
(Denmark) Ellen Petersen	1	9	9	0	3
7	(England) Suzanne Horner	9	9	9	9
(South Africa) Annelize Naudé	3	2	2
12	(Scotland) Pamela Nimmo	9	9	9
(United States) Shabana Khan	2	3	1

Second round
1	(New Zealand) Joyce	7	10	9	9
13	(England) Botwright	9	8	2	0
5	(England) Geaves	9	1	9	9
15	(Australia) N Grinham	4	9	2	2
4	(England) Charman-Smith	9	9	9
(Malaysia) David	3	2	1
6	(England) Brind	9	9	10
14	(New Zealand) Kitchen	7	2	8
2	(New Zealand) Owens	9	9	9
10	(England) Macree	0	0	5
11	(England) Campion	9	9	9
8	(Australia) R Grinham	4	2	1
3	(Australia) Fitzgerald	9	9	9
9	(Netherlands) Atkinson	4	0	0
7	(England) Horner	9	3	9	9
12	(Scotland) Nimmo	2	9	6	4

Quarter-finals
1	(New Zealand) Joyce	9	9	9
5	(England) Geaves	3	4	2
4	(England) Charman-Smith	9	9	9
6	(England) Brind	1	0	7
2	(New Zealand) Owens	9	9	9
11	(England) Campion	5	4	4
3	(Australia) Fitzgerald	9	9	9
7	(England) Horner	0	4	2

Semi-finals
1	(New Zealand) Joyce	9	9	10
4	(England) Charman-Smith	3	5	8
Final
1	(New Zealand) Joyce	0	3	2
3	(Australia) Fitzgerald	9	9	9
2	(New Zealand) Owens	1	1	5
3	(Australia) Fitzgerald	9	9	9

=== Notes ===
Defending champion Carol Owens represented New Zealand after switching nationality from Australia.

== See also ==
- World Open

Preceded by Edinburgh (Scotland); 2000	World Open; Melbourne (Australia); 2001	Succeeded by Doha (Qatar); 2002
