= 1997 Women's World Open Squash Championship =

Women's World Open 1997
- 14th WISPA World Squash Championship
- Location: Sydney, Australia
- Date: October 13–19, 1997

WISPA World Tour
- Category: World Open
- Prize money: $75,000

Results
- Champion: (Australia) Sarah Fitzgerald
- Runner-up: (Australia) Michelle Martin
- Semi-finalists: (England) Sue Wright (Australia) Carol Owens

The 1997 Women's Mazda World Open Squash Championship was the women's edition of the 1997 World Open, which serves as the individual world championship for squash players. The event took place in Sydney in Australia during October 1997. Sarah Fitzgerald won her second World Open title, defeating Michelle Martin in the final.

== Seeds ==
1. (Australia) Sarah Fitzgerald (champion)
2. (Australia) Michelle Martin (final)
3. (England) Cassie Jackman (quarterfinals)
4. (England) Sue Wright (semifinals)
5. (Australia) Carol Owens (semifinals)
6. (Australia) Liz Irving (quarterfinals)
7. (Germany) Sabine Schoene (quarterfinals)
8. (England) Suzanne Horner (quarterfinals)
9. (England) Linda Charman (second round)
10. (England) Fiona Geaves (second round)
11. (England) Jane Martin (second round)
12. (South Africa) Claire Nitch (second round)
13. (New Zealand) Leilani Joyce (second round)
14. (New Zealand) Philippa Beams (second round)
15. (Australia) Robyn Cooper (second round)
16. (South Africa) Natalie Grainger (second round)

== Draw and results ==
First round
1	(Australia) Sarah Fitzgerald	9	9	9
(Spain) Natalia Meneu	1	0	0
15	(Australia) Robyn Cooper	9	9
(New Zealand) Sarah Cook	7	4	ret
8	(England) Suzanne Horner	9	9	9
(Australia) Emma Major	1	3	7
10	(England) Fiona Geaves	9	9	9
(Australia) Vicki Cardwell	0	4	4
4	(England) Sue Wright	10	9	9
(Australia) Toni Weeks	9	5	7
14	(New Zealand) Philippa Beams	9	6	9	9
(Australia) Natarsha Tippett	3	9	0	7
6	(Australia) Liz Irving	9	9	9
(Egypt) Maha Zein	3	6	0
16	(South Africa) Natalie Grainger	9	9	9
(Austria) Pamela Pancis	3	3	4
2	(Australia) Michelle Martin	9	9	9
(Australia) Kate Major	1	0	5
13	(New Zealand) Leilani Joyce	9	9	9
(England) Jenny Tranfield	2	3	0
7	(Germany) Sabine Schoene	9	9	9
(New Zealand) Jade Wilson	5	0	3
9	(England) Linda Charman	9	4	9	9
(England) Tracey Shenton	1	9	1	3
5	(Australia) Carol Owens	2	9	9	9
(Netherlands) Vanessa Atkinson	6	0	3
11	(England) Jane Martin	9	9	9
(Australia) Melissa Vacca	1	1	3
3	(England) Cassie Jackman	8	9	9	9
(Australia) Kym Keevil	10	3	3	2
12	(South Africa) Claire Nitch	9	10	9
(Australia) Rachael Grinham	1	9	5

Second round
1	(Australia) Sarah Fitzgerald	9	9	9
15	(Australia) Robyn Cooper	3	3	6
8	(England) Suzanne Horner	9	4	9	9
10	(England) Fiona Geaves	2	9	4	1
4	(England) Sue Wright	9	9	9
14	(New Zealand) Philippa Beams	3	1	0
6	(Australia) Liz Irving	9	9	2	9
16	(South Africa) Natalie Grainger	6	4	9	6
2	(Australia) Michelle Martin	9	9	9
13	(New Zealand) Leilani Joyce	5	3	0
7	(Germany) Sabine Schoene	9	9	9
9	(England) Linda Charman	4	0	4
5	(Australia) Carol Owens	8	6	9	9	9
11	(England) Jane Martin	10	9	2	4	2
3	(England) Cassie Jackman	9	9	10
12	(South Africa) Claire Nitch	2	5	8

Quarter-finals
1	(Australia) Sarah Fitzgerald	9	9	9
8	(England) Suzanne Horner	3	0	4
4	(England) Sue Wright	9	9	9
6	(Australia) Liz Irving	1	5	5
2	(Australia) Michelle Martin	1	9	9	9
7	(Germany) Sabine Schoene	9	2	5	5
5	(Australia) Carol Owens	4	9	7	9	9
3	(England) Cassie Jackman	9	6	9	0	6

Semi-finals
1	(Australia) Sarah Fitzgerald	9	9	9
4	(England) Sue Wright	2	0	4
Final
1	(Australia) Sarah Fitzgerald	9	5	6	9	9
2	(Australia) Michelle Martin	5	9	9	2	3
2	(Australia) Michelle Martin	6	9	9	10
5	(Australia) Carol Owens	9	2	6	8

== See also ==
- World Open
- 1997 Men's World Open Squash Championship

Preceded by Petaling Jaya (Malaysia); 1996	World Open; Sydney (Australia); 1997	Succeeded by Stuttgart (Germany); 1998
