= 1994 Women's World Open Squash Championship =

Squash competition

Women's World Open 1994
- 11th WISPA World Squash Championship
- Location: Saint Peter Port, Guernsey
- Date: October 4–9, 1994

WISPA World Tour
- Category: World Open
- Prize money: $64,000

Results
- Champion: (Australia) Michelle Martin
- Runner-up: (England) Cassie Jackman
- Semi-finalists: (England) Suzanne Horner (England) Fiona Geaves

The 1994 Women's World Open Squash Championship was the women's edition of the 1994 World Open, which serves as the individual world championship for squash players. The event took place in Saint Peter Port in Guernsey between 4 October and 9 October 1994. Michelle Martin won her second World Open title, defeating Cassie Jackman in the final.

== Seeds ==
1. (Australia) Michelle Martin (champion)
2. (Australia) Liz Irving (quarterfinals)
3. (England) Suzanne Horner (semifinals)
4. (England) Cassie Jackman (final)
5. (Australia) Sarah Fitzgerald (quarterfinals)
6. (Australia) Carol Owens (quarterfinals)
7. (England) Sue Wright (quarterfinals)
8. (England) Fiona Geaves (semifinals)
9. (South Africa) Claire Nitch (second round)
10. (Guernsey) Martine Le Moignan (first round)
11. (Germany) Sabine Schoene (second round)
12. (England) Rebecca Macree (second round)
13. (England) Jane Martin (second round)
14. (Scotland) Heather Wallace (second round)
15. (Australia) Vicki Cardwell (second round)
16. (New Zealand) Philippa Beams (second round)

=== First round ===
Player One	Player Two	Score
(Australia) Michelle Martin	(Netherlands) Nicole Beumer	9-2 9-4 9-3
(Australia) Liz Irving	(Malaysia) Koh Yoke Keet	9-0 9-3 9-4
(England) Suzanne Horner	(Brazil) Adriana Moura	9-0 ret
(England) Cassie Jackman	(Japan) Miyuki Adachi	9-0 9-0 9-0
(Australia) Sarah Fitzgerald	(England) Rebecca Poole	9-1 9-3 9-1
(Australia) Carol Owens	(Australia) Rachael Grinham	9-2 9-0 9-6
(England) Sue Wright	(England) Alison Wray	
(England) Fiona Geaves	(United States) Karen Kelso	9-0 9-0 9-1
(South Africa) Claire Nitch	(France) Corinne Castets	9-2 9-4 9-6
(Guernsey) Martine Le Moignan	(Japan) Tamaki Yoshino	9-0 9-0 9-0
(Germany) Sabine Schoene	(South Africa) Angelique Clifton-Parks	9-3 9-6 9-3
(England) Rebecca Macree	(England) Tracey Shenton	6-9 8-10 9-4 9-4 9-5
(England) Jane Martin	(Canada) Barbara Cooper	9-2 9-7 9-8
(Australia) Vicki Cardwell	(Germany) Silke Bartel	9-7 9-0 9-4
(Canada) Melanie Jans	(United States) Amy Milanek	9-4 9-4 9-0
(Australia) Robyn Cooper	(England) Janie Thacker	9-6 9-1 9-6
(England) Samantha Langley	(India) Misha Grewal	9-2 9-2 9-4
(United States) Demer Holleran	(Israel) Claire Levine	9-3 9-3 5-9 9-0
(Australia) Meeghan Bell	(Republic of Ireland) Rebecca O’Callaghan (née Best)	9-3 9-4 6-9 9-1
(England) Donia Leeves	(Sweden) Eva Svenby	9-3 10-8 9-5
(Australia) Toni Weeks	(Scotland) Claire Waddell	8-10 9-3 9-4 9-3
(Netherlands) Denise Sommers	(England) Pauline Nicholl	9-1 8-10 9-2 3-9 9-3
(England) Linda Charman	(Finland) Tuula Myllyniemi	9-3 10-9 9-3
(New Zealand) Jade Wilson	(Germany) Sabine Baum	10-8 7-9 6-9 10-8 9-6
(Scotland) Senga Macfie	(New Zealand) Sarah Cook	9-2 10-8 9-2
(Netherlands) Hugoline van Hoorn	(Germany) Beate Seidler	9-4 9-6 9-5
(New Zealand) Leilani Marsh	(United States) Ellie Pierce	9-5 7-9 9-3 9-1

== Second round To final ==
Second round
1	(Australia) Michelle Martin	9	9	9
(Canada) Melanie Jans	0	1	3
14	(Scotland) Heather Wallace	9	9	9
(England) Sarah Spacey	3	2	3
7	(England) Sue Wright	9	9	9
(South Africa) Chantel Clifton-Parks	7	6	5
16	(New Zealand) Philippa Beams	9	9	9
(Australia) Sharon Bradey	4	1	2
3	(England) Suzanne Horner	10	9	9
(England) Samantha Langley	8	6	0
12	(England) Rebecca Macree	4	10	9	9
(Scotland) Senga Macfie	9	8	0	2
5	(Australia) Sarah Fitzgerald	9	9	9
(Australia) Meeghan Bell	3	3	6
9	(South Africa) Claire Nitch	9	7	9	10
(Netherlands) Denise Sommers	1	9	1	8
4	(Australia) Cassie Jackman	9	9	9
(United States) Demer Holleran	7	1	4
15	(Australia) Vicki Cardwell	9	6	9	8	9
(New Zealand) Leilani Marsh	5	9	3	10	5
6	(Australia) Carol Owens	9	9	9
(England) Donia Leeves	5	2	4
13	(England) Jane Martin	10	9	9
(Netherlands) Hugoline van Hoorn	8	3	7
8	(England) Fiona Geaves	4	9	9	9
(Australia) Toni Weeks	9	0	2	4
11	(Germany) Sabine Schoene	9	9	9
(New Zealand) Jade Wilson	0	0	0
2	(Australia) Liz Irving	9	9	9
(Australia) Robyn Cooper	0	3	2
(England) Linda Charman	9	5	9	9
10	(Guernsey) Martine Le Moignan	2	9	7	6

Third round
1	(Australia) M Martin	10	9	9
14	(Scotland) Wallace	8	6	7
7	(England) Wright	10	9	9
16	(New Zealand) Beams	9	7	1
3	(England) Horner	9	9	9
12	(England) Macree	1	1	0
5	(Australia) Fitzgerald	9	9	9
9	(South Africa) Nitch	2	4	7
4	(England) Jackman	9	9	9
15	(Australia) Cardwell	4	4	0
6	(Australia) Owens	9	9	9
13	(England) J Martin	3	0	4
8	(England) Geaves	9	8	9	9
11	(Germany) Schoene	5	10	5	3
2	(Australia) Irving	9	9	5	9
(England) Charman	0	6	9	6

Quarter-finals
1	(Australia) M Martin	9	9	9
7	(England) Wright	2	7	1
3	(England) Horner	9	10	9
5	(Australia) Fitzgerald	4	8	2
4	(England) Jackman	9	3	9	9
6	(Australia) Owens	6	9	5	1
8	(England) Geaves	9	2	9	0	9
2	(Australia) Irving	7	9	3	9	7

Semi-finals
1	(Australia) M Martin	9	9	9
3	(England) Horner	4	4	6
Final
1	(Australia) M Martin	9	9	9
4	(England) Jackman	1	0	6
4	(England) Jackman	9	8	9
8	(England) Geaves	4	1	2

== See also ==
- World Open
- 1994 Men's World Open Squash Championship

Preceded by Johannesburg (South Africa); 1993	World Open; Guernsey (Saint Peter Port); 1994	Succeeded by (Hong Kong); 1995
