= 1995 Women's World Open Squash Championship =

Squash competition

Women's World Open 1995
- 12th WISPA World Squash Championship
- Location: Hong Kong
- Date: 27 June to 2 July 1995

WISPA World Tour
- Category: World Open
- Prize money: $58,000

Results
- Champion: (Australia) Michelle Martin
- Runner-up: (Australia) Sarah Fitzgerald
- Semi-finalists: (England) Cassie Jackman (England) Fiona Geaves

The 1995 Women's Pak Fah Yeow World Open Squash Championship was the women's edition of the 1995 World Open, which serves as the individual world championship for squash players. The event took place in Hong Kong between 27 June and 2 July 1995.

Michelle Martin won her third World Open title, defeating Sarah Fitzgerald in the final.

== Seeds ==
1. (Australia) Michelle Martin (Champion)
2. (England) Suzanne Horner (Quarterfinals)
3. (England) Cassie Jackman (Semifinals)
4. (Australia) Sarah Fitzgerald (runner-up)
5. (Australia) Liz Irving (Quarterfinals)
6. (Australia) Carol Owens (Quarterfinals)
7. (England) Fiona Geaves (Semifinals)
8. (England) Sue Wright (Quarterfinals)

== Draw and results ==
First round
1	(Australia) Michelle Martin	9	9	9
(New Zealand) Sarah Cook	2	1	6
11	(England) Jane Martin	9	9	9
(South Africa) Carla Venter	1	0	6
8	(England) Sue Wright	9	9	9
(Australia) Narelle Tippett	4	3	1
(Australia) Vicki Cardwell	9	9	9
(Wales) Tegwen Malik	4	2	1
3	(England) Cassie Jackman	10	9	9
(England) Linda Charman	8	1	4
(Canada) Heather Wallace	9	9	9
(Germany) Sabine Baum	6	1	1
6	(Australia) Carol Owens	9	9	9
(Australia) Meeghan Bell	3	4	3
(New Zealand) Philippa Beams	9	9	9
(Netherlands) Hugoline van Hoorn	2	0	1
4	(Australia) Sarah Fitz-Gerald	9	9	9
(England) Donia Leeves	1	2	2
(England) Rebecca Macree	9	9	9
(Israel) Claire Levine	5	0	3
5	(Australia) Liz Irving	9	9	9
(United States) Amy Milanek	3	0	3
(Germany) Sabine Schoene	9	10	10
(New Zealand) Leilani Marsh	6	8	8
7	(England) Fiona Geaves	9	4	9	8	9
(England) Tracey Shenton	6	9	6	10	6
(South Africa) Claire Nitch	9	9	8	9
(Australia) Toni Weeks	0	2	10	3
2	(England) Suzanne Horner	9	9	9
(Scotland) Senga Macfie	7	2	3
(Australia) Robyn Cooper	9	9	9
(Australia) Sharon Bradey	3	5	5

Second round
1	(Australia) M Martin	9	10	9
11	(England) J Martin	4	8	3
8	(England) Wright	9	9	6	9
(Australia) Cardwell	7	0	9	8
3	(England) Jackman	9	9	6	9
(Canada) Wallace	6	1	9	0
6	(Australia) Owens	5	9	9	9
(New Zealand) Beams	9	7	4	7
4	(Australia) Fitzgerald	9	9	9
(England) Macree	0	4	0
5	(Australia) Irving	9	9	9
(Germany) Schoene	3	4	2
7	(England) Geaves	9	9	7	9
(South Africa) Nitch	2	7	9	3
2	(England) Horner	9	9	9
(Australia) Cooper	6	5	1

Quarter-finals
1	(Australia) M Martin	9	10	6	9
8	(England) Wright	1	8	9	4
3	(England) Jackman	9	9	7	9
6	(Australia) Owens	7	7	9	2
4	(Australia) Fitzgerald	9	9	9
5	(Australia) Irving	6	6	3
7	(England) Geaves	9	9	9
2	(England) Horner	5	6	1

Semi-finals
1	(Australia) M Martin	9	7	9	9
3	(England) Jackman	6	9	2	3
Final
1	(Australia) M Martin	8	9	9	9
4	(Australia) Fitzgerald	10	2	6	3
4	(Australia) Fitzgerald	9	9	9
7	(England) Geaves	6	4	0

=== Notes ===
Michelle Martin won her third consecutive title, the third game dropped in the quarter-finals to Sue Wright was the first Martin had lost since losing the 1992 final to Susan Devoy.

== See also ==
- World Open
- 1995 Men's World Open Squash Championship

Preceded by Saint Peter Port (Guernsey); 1994	World Open (Hong Kong); 1995	Succeeded by Petaling Jaya (Malaysia); 1996
