= PSA World Tour records =

The Professional Squash Association, or PSA, was formed in 1975, is the governing body for the men's and women's (since 2014) professional squash circuit. The previous women's squash tour were the Women's International Squash Players Association, or WISPA, between 1993 and 2011, follow by the Women's Squash Association between 2011 and 2014.

These are some of the important PSA records since the inception in 1975 (1993 for women).

== Tour Titles Records ==
=== All Tournament ===
==== Men ====
	Titles	#
1.	(Pakistan) Jansher Khan	99
2.	(Pakistan) Jahangir Khan	61
3.	(Scotland) / (England) Peter Nicol	52
4.	(England) Mohamed El Shorbagy	51
5.	(Egypt) Ali Farag	46
6.	(France) Grégory Gaultier	44
7.	(Egypt) Ramy Ashour	40
8.	(Canada) Jonathon Power	37
9.	(England) Nick Matthew	35
10.	(Czech Republic) Jan Koukal	34

	Finals	#
1.	(Pakistan) Jansher Khan	118
2.	(France) Grégory Gaultier	83
3.	(Pakistan) Jahangir Khan	81
=	(Egypt) Ali Farag	81
5.	(England) Mohamed El Shorbagy	81
6.	(England) Nick Matthew	75
7.	(Scotland) / (England) Peter Nicol	69
8.	(Canada) Jonathon Power	61
9.	(Czech Republic) Jan Koukal	59
=	(Egypt) Ramy Ashour	59

==== Women ====
	Titles	#
1.	(Malaysia) Nicol David	81
2.	(Australia) Sarah Fitz-Gerald	62
3.	(Australia) Michelle Martin	56
4.	(New Zealand) Susan Devoy	53
5.	(Egypt) Nour El Sherbini	44
6.	(Australia) Rachael Grinham	37
7.	(Egypt) Nouran Gohar	35
8.	(England) Cassie Jackman	28
9.	(New Zealand) Carol Owens	27
10.	(Netherlands) Vanessa Atkinson	25

	Finals	#
1.	(Malaysia) Nicol David	102
2.	(Australia) Sarah Fitz-Gerald	90
3.	(Australia) Michelle Martin	85
4.	(Australia) Rachael Grinham	75
5	(Egypt) Nour El Sherbini	73
6.	(Egypt) Nouran Gohar	61
7.	(England) Cassie Jackman	57
8.	(New Zealand) Susan Devoy	56
9.	(New Zealand) Carol Owens	50
10.	(Australia) / (Netherlands) Natalie Grinham	47

As of August 15th, 2015

=== World Series Tournament ===
==== Men ====
	Titles	#
1.	(Pakistan) Jansher Khan	35
2.	(Egypt) Ramy Ashour	27
3.	(Scotland) / (England) Peter Nicol	23
4.	(Egypt) Amr Shabana	20
5.	(England) Nick Matthew	15
6.	(Canada) Jonathon Power	14
7.	(France) Grégory Gaultier	12
8.	(Egypt) Mohamed El Shorbagy	11
9.	(England) James Willstrop	8
10.	(Australia) David Palmer	7

	Finals	#
1.	(Egypt) Ramy Ashour	40
2.	(Pakistan) Jansher Khan	39
3.	(France) Grégory Gaultier	37
4.	(Scotland) / (England) Peter Nicol	34
=	(England) Nick Matthew	34
6.	(Egypt) Amr Shabana	28
7.	(Canada) Jonathon Power	24
8.	(England) James Willstrop	20
9.	(Australia) David Palmer	18
10.	(Egypt) Mohamed El Shorbagy	17

==== Women ====
	Titles	#
1.	(Malaysia) Nicol David	61
2.	(Australia) Sarah Fitz-Gerald	20
3.	(Australia) Michelle Martin	18
4.	(Netherlands) Vanessa Atkinson	9
5.	(New Zealand) Carol Owens	8
=	(England) Laura Massaro	8
6.	(Australia) Rachael Grinham	7
7.	(England) Cassie Jackman	6
=	(New Zealand) Leilani Rorani	6
10.	(United States) Natalie Grainger	4

	Finals	#
1.	(Malaysia) Nicol David	71
2.	(Australia) Sarah Fitz-Gerald	30
=	(Australia) Michelle Martin	30
4.	(New Zealand) Carol Owens	20
=	(Australia) Rachael Grinham	20
6.	(England) Cassie Jackman	19
=	(Australia) / (Netherlands) Natalie Grinham	19
8.	(England) Laura Massaro	15
9.	(United States) Natalie Grainger	12
=	(England) Jenny Duncalf	12

As of August 15th, 2015

== Youngest Tour Winners ==
=== All Tournament ===
==== Men ====
	Winner	Age	Event	Date
1.	(Egypt) Ahmed Barada	16 years, 1 month	Al Mannai Open (EGY)	3 June 1993
2.	(Egypt) Amr Khaled Khalifa	16 years, 2 months	Palestra In Forma Open (ITA)	22 February 2009
3.	(Egypt) Mohamed Abouelghar	16 years, 5 months	Royal Jordanian Open (JOR)	27 March 2010
4.	(Pakistan) Jahangir Khan	16 years, 11 months	Pakistan Open (PAK)	15 November 1980
5.	(Pakistan) Nasir Iqbal	16 years, 11 months	Pakistan Circuit N°1 (PAK)	31 March 2011

==== Women ====
	Winner	Age	Event	Date
1.	(Egypt) Habiba Mohamed	14 years, 5 months	Malaysian Tour Grand Final (MAS)	17 November 2013
2.	(Egypt) Hania El Hammamy	14 years, 6 months	Geneva Open (SUI)	22 March 2015
3.	(Egypt) Nour El Sherbini	14 years, 10 months	Heliopolis Open (EGY)	14 September 2010
4.	(Egypt) Yathreb Adel	15 years	Swiss Open (SUI)	20 March 2011
5.	(India) Anaka Alankamony	15 years, 2 months	Indian Challenger (IND)	12 September 2009

As of August 15th, 2015

== Oldest Tour Winners ==
=== All Tournament ===
==== Men ====
	Winner	Age	Event	Date
1.	(Australia) Mike Corren	48 years, 4 months	2022 WA Open PSA (AUS)	12 June 2022
5.	(Italy) Stéphane Galifi	37 years, 7 months	Black Sea Open (UKR)	23 August 2015
2.	(Canada) Shahier Razik	36 years, 10 months	National Capital Open (CAN)	5 October 2014
3.	(Brazil) Rafael Alarçón	36 years, 7 months	Galeria Shopping Open (BRA)	15 September 2013
4.	(Wales) Alex Gough	36 years, 4 months	Irish Open (IRL)	22 April 2007

==== Women ====
	Winner	Age	Event	Date
1.	(Australia) Vicki Cardwell	41 years, 3 months	Head Satellite N°3 (MAS)	10 August 1996
2.	(England) Suzanne Horner	40 years	Swiss Open (SUI)	9 March 2003
3.	(United States) Latasha Khan	39 years, 7 months	Orange County Open (USA)	16 September 2012
5.	(Republic of Ireland) Madeline Perry	39 years, 3 months	NT Open (AUS)	15 May 2016
4.	(France) Corinne Castets	38 years, 10 months	Carcassonne City Open (FRA)	24 May 2004

As of August 15th, 2015

== See also ==
- Squash
- PSA World Tour
