= 2000 Women's World Open Squash Championship =

Women's World Open 2000
- 17th WISPA World Squash Championship
- Location: Edinburgh, Scotland
- Date(s): November 11–17, 2000

WISPA World Tour
- Category: World Open
- Prize money: $80,000

Results
- Champion: (Australia) Carol Owens
- Runner-up: (New Zealand) Leilani Joyce
- Semi-finalists: (England) Natalie Grainger (Australia) Sarah Fitzgerald

The 2000 Women's Eye Group World Open Squash Championship was the women's edition of the 2000 World Open, which serves as the individual world championship for squash players. The event took place in Edinburgh in Scotland from 11 November until 17 November 2000. Carol Owens won the World Open title, defeating Leilani Joyce in the final.

== Seeds ==
1. (New Zealand) Leilani Joyce (final)
2. (Australia) Carol Owens (champion)
3. (England) Natalie Grainger (semifinals)
4. (England) Linda Charman (quarterfinals)
5. (England) Tania Bailey (quarterfinals)
6. (England) Suzanne Horner (quarterfinals)
7. (Australia) Sarah Fitzgerald (semifinals)
8. (England) Fiona Geaves (second round)
9. (Netherlands) Vanessa Atkinson (second round)
10. (England) Stephanie Brind (quarterfinals)
11. (Australia) Rachael Grinham (second round)
12. (Germany) Sabine Schoene (second round)
13. (England) Rebecca Macree (second round)
14. (South Africa) Claire Nitch (first round)
15. (England) Jenny Tranfield (second round)
16. (Scotland) Pamela Nimmo (second round)

== Draw and results ==
First round
1	(New Zealand) Leilani Joyce	9	9	9
(Egypt) Omneya Abdel Kawy	2	5	1
8	(Netherlands) Vanessa Atkinson	9	9	9
(United States) Latasha Khan	1	2	3
6	(England) Suzanne Horner	9	9	9
(Egypt) Maha Zein	4	5	2
13	(England) Rebecca Macree	4	3	9
(France) Isabelle Stoehr	4	2	7
3	(England) Natalie Grainger	10	9	1	9
(Denmark) Ellen Petersen	8	7	9	0
11	(Australia) Rachael Grinham	9	6	10	1	9
(Egypt) Salma Shabana	4	0	1
10	(England) Stephanie Brind	9	10	9
(Australia) Natalie Grinham	5	0	4
8	(England) Fiona Geaves	9	10	9
(Republic of Ireland) Madeline Perry	1	8	0
2	(Australia) Carol Owens	9	9	9
(England) Janie Thacker	0	1	4
(England) Vicky Botwright	9	9	9
14	(South Africa) Claire Nitch	3	6	1
5	(England) Tania Bailey	9	1	9	9
(Scotland) Senga Macfie	6	9	3	6
12	(Germany) Sabine Schoene	10	9	9
(South Africa) Annelize Naudé	8	4	7
7	(Australia) Sarah Fitzgerald	9	9	9
(Australia) Liz Irving	3	0	3
15	(England) Jenny Tranfield	9	9	9
(Norway) Elin Blikra	5	0	4
4	(England) Linda Charman	9	9	9	9
13	(Hong Kong) Rebecca Chiu	1	4	6
16	(Scotland) Pamela Nimmo	7	9	9	10
(New Zealand) Shelley Kitchen	9	4	4	8

Second round
1	(New Zealand) Leilani Joyce	9	5	9	9
9	(Netherlands) Vanessa Atkinson	2	9	5	5
6	(England) Suzanne Horner	9	9	10
13	(England) Rebecca Macree	2	3	8
3	(England) Natalie Grainger	9	3	9	9
11	(Australia) Rachael Grinham	6	9	7	7
10	(England) Stephanie Brind	9	3	8	9	9
8	(England) Fiona Geaves	0	9	10	2	2
2	(Australia) Carol Owens	9	9	9
(England) Vicky Botwright	3	0	2
5	(England) Tania Bailey	9	10	9
12	(Germany) Sabine Schoene	2	9	7
7	(Australia) Sarah Fitzgerald	9	9	9
15	(England) Jenny Tranfield	0	1	2
4	(England) Linda Charman	9	9	9
16	(Scotland) Pamela Nimmo	5	2	2

Quarter-finals
1	(New Zealand) Leilani Joyce	9	9	9
6	(England) Suzanne Horner	2	6	0
3	(England) Natalie Grainger	9	9	9
10	(England) Stephanie Brind	2	5	3
2	(Australia) Carol Owens	9	9	9
5	(England) Tania Bailey	5	0	1
7	(Australia) Sarah Fitzgerald	9	9	9
4	(England) Linda Charman	3	0	1

Semi-finals
1	(New Zealand) Leilani Joyce	9	9	9	4	9
3	(England) Natalie Grainger	6	3	10	9	5
Final
1	(New Zealand) Leilani Joyce	9	9	8	6	1
2	(Australia) Carol Owens	7	3	10	9	9
2	(Australia) Carols Owens	9	9	7	5	9
7	(Australia) Sarah Fitzgerald	6	5	9	9	6

=== Notes ===
Cassie Campion was unable to defend her title due to injury.
The new world champion Carol Owens would switch nationality the following year.

== See also ==
- World Open

Preceded by Seattle (United States); 1999	World Open; Edinburgh (Scotland); 2000	Succeeded by Melbourne (Australia); 2001
