= 1994 Women's World Team Squash Championships =

Women's World Team 1994
- 9th World Women's Team Championship
- Location: Saint Peter Port, Guernsey
- Date: October 10–16, 1994

Results
- Champions: Australia
- Runners-up: England
- Third place: South Africa

The 1994 Women's World Team Squash Championships were held in Saint Peter Port, Guernsey and took place from October 10 until October 16, 1994.

== Seeds ==
1. Australia
2. England
3. New Zealand
4. Netherlands
5. South Africa
6. Canada
7. Germany
8. Scotland

== First round ==
=== Pool A ===
Date	Team One	Team Two	Score
Oct 10	Australia	Scotland	3-0
Oct 10	South Africa	Netherlands	2-1
Oct 11	South Africa	Scotland	2-1
Oct 11	Australia	Netherlands	3-0
Oct 12	Netherlands	Scotland	2-1
Oct 12	Australia	South Africa	3-0

Pos	Nation	Team	P	W	L	Pts
1	Australia	Liz Irving, Michelle Martin, Sarah Fitzgerald, Carol Owens	3	3	0	6
2	South Africa	Claire Nitch, Natalie Grainger, Chantel Clifton-Parks	3	2	1	4
3	Netherlands	Hugoline van Hoorn, Marjolein Houtsma, Denise Sommers, Nicole Beumer	3	1	2	2
4	Scotland	Senga Macfie, Claire Waddell, Wendy Maitland, Helen Macfie	3	0	3	0

=== Pool B ===
Date	Team One	Team Two	Score
Oct 10	England	Canada	3-0
Oct 10	New Zealand	Germany	2-1
Oct 11	England	Germany	3-0
Oct 11	New Zealand	Canada	3-0
Oct 12	England	New Zealand	3-0
Oct 12	Germany	Canada	3-0

Pos	Nation	Team	P	W	L	Pts
1	England	Sue Wright, Cassie Jackman, Suzanne Horner, Martine Le Moignan	3	3	0	6
2	New Zealand	Leilani Marsh, Jade Wilson, Philippa Beams, Sarah Cook	3	2	1	4
3	Germany	Sabine Schöne, Sabine Baum, Silke Bartel, Beate Seidler	3	1	2	2
4	Canada	Heather Wallace, Melanie Jans, Lori Styner, Barbara Cooper	3	0	0	3

== Semi finals ==
Team One	Team Two	Score
Australia	New Zealand	3-0
England	South Africa	3-0

== Third place play off ==
Team One	Team Two	Score
South Africa	New Zealand	2-1

== Final ==
Australia
3
FINAL
Saint Peter Port, Guernsey
16 October 1996

England
0

			1	2	3	4	5
1	(Australia) (England)	Michelle Martin; Suzanne Horner	9; 6	9; 2	9; 6
2	(Australia) (England)	Liz Irving; Sue Wright	9; 1	9; 5	9; 6
3	(Australia) (England)	Sarah Fitzgerald; Cassie Jackman	9; 3	9; 0	9; 4

Preceded by Canada; 1992	Squash World Team; Guernsey; 1994	Succeeded by Malaysia; 1996

== See also ==
- World Team Squash Championships
- World Squash Federation
- World Open (squash)
