= 2002 Women's World Open Squash Championship =

Women's World Open 2002
- 20th WISPA World Squash Championship
- Location: Doha, Qatar
- Date: October 26 - November 02, 2002.

WISPA World Tour
- Category: WISPA World Open
- Prize money: $102,500

Results
- Champion: (Australia) Sarah Fitzgerald
- Runner-up: (England) Natalie Pohrer
- Semi-finalists: (New Zealand) Carol Owens (England) Linda Charman

The 2002 Women's World Open Squash Championship was the women's edition of the 2002 World Open, which serves as the individual world championship for squash players. The event took place in Doha in Qatar from 26 October until 2 November 2002. Sarah Fitzgerald won a record fifth World Open title, defeating Natalie Pohrer in the final.

== Seeds ==
1. (Australia) Sarah Fitzgerald (champion)
2. (New Zealand) Carol Owens (semifinals)
3. (England) Natalie Pohrer (final)
4. (England) Linda Charman (semifinals)
5. (Netherlands) Vanessa Atkinson (quarterfinals)
6. (Australia) Rachael Grinham (quarterfinals)
7. (England) Stephanie Brind (second round)
8. (England) Tania Bailey (quarterfinals)
9. (England) Fiona Geaves (second round)
10. (Australia) Natalie Grinham (second round)
11. (Scotland) Pamela Nimmo (first round)
12. (England) Vicky Botwright (first round)
13. (Egypt) Omneya Abdel Kawy (second round)
14. (New Zealand) Shelley Kitchen (second round)
15. (England) Jenny Tranfield (quarterfinals)
16. (Denmark) Ellen Petersen (second round)

== Draw and results ==
First round
1	(Australia) Sarah Fitzgerald	9	9	9
(Australia) Heidi Mather	3	1	2
13	(Egypt) Omneya Abdel Kawy	9	9	9
(Malaysia) Sharon Wee	1	0	1
5	(Netherlands) Vanessa Atkinson	9	9	9
(Republic of Ireland) Madeline Perry	1	3	5
16	(Denmark) Ellen Petersen	8	6	9	9	9
(Scotland) Wendy Maitland	10	9	5	2	5
4	(England) Linda Charman	9	9	9
(England) Vicky Lankester	2	1	1
(France) Isabelle Stoehr	9	9	9
11	(Scotland) Pamela Nimmo	2	6	5
8	(England) Tania Bailey	9	9	9
(Belgium) Kim Hannes	1	0	1
(Netherlands) Annelize Naudé	9	9	9
12	(England) Vicky Botwright	7	5	5
2	(New Zealand) Carol Owens	9	9	9
(England) Cheryl Beaumont	2	3	1
10	(Australia) Natalie Grinham	9	9	9
(New Zealand) Lara Petera	4	1	7
15	(England) Jenny Tranfield	9	9	9
(England) Kate Allison	5	7	0
7	(England) Stephanie Brind	9	9	9
(Egypt) Maha Zein	4	2	0
3	(England) Natalie Pohrer	9	9	9
(United States) Latasha Khan	1	0	0
14	(New Zealand) Shelley Kitchen	9	9	10
(Hong Kong) Rebecca Chiu	2	5	8
6	(Australia) Rachael Grinham	9	10	9
(Egypt) Engy Kheirallah	2	8	3
9	(England) Fiona Geaves	9	9	9
(England) Dominique Lloyd-Walter	0	0	0

Second round
1	(Australia) Fitzgerald	9	9	9
13	(Egypt) Abdel Kawy	6	1	5
5	(Netherlands) Atkinson	9	9	10
16	(Denmark) Petersen	4	0	3
4	(England) Charman	9	9	9
(France) Stoehr	0	3	2
8	(England) Bailey	9	9	9
(Netherlands) Naudé	3	2	1
2	(New Zealand) Owens	9	9	9
10	(Australia) N Grinham	4	3	4
15	(England) Tranfield	9	9	9	9
7	(England) Brind	1	10	7	0
3	(England) Pohrer	9	9	9
14	(New Zealand) Kitchen	4	2	3
6	(Australia) R Grinham	9	9	10
9	(England) Geaves	3	4	9

Quarter-finals
1	(Australia) Fitzgerald	9	9	9
5	(Netherlands) Atkinson	1	1	6
4	(England) Charman	2	9	9	7	9
8	(England) Bailey	9	5	4	9	1
2	(New Zealand) Owens	9	9	9
15	(England) Tranfield	1	0	1
3	(England) Pohrer	6	9	9	4	10
6	(Australia) R Grinham	9	7	5	9	8

Semi-finals
1	(Australia) Fitzgerald	9	1	9	9
4	(England) Charman	2	9	4	5
Final
1	(Australia) Fitzgerald	10	9	7	9
3	(England) Pohrer	8	3	9	7
2	(New Zealand) Owens	9	9	5	1	8
3	(England) Pohrer	5	2	9	9	10

=== Notes ===
Natalie Pohrer was formerly Natalie Grainger.
Annelize Naudé switched nationality from South Africa to the Netherlands.

== See also ==
- World Open
- 2002 Men's World Open Squash Championship

Preceded by Melbourne (Australia); 2001	World Open; Doha (Qatar); 2002	Succeeded by Hong Kong; 2003
