= 1996 Women's World Team Squash Championships =

Women's World Team 1996
- 10th World Women's Team Championship
- Location: Petaling Jaya, Malaysia
- Date: October 14–19, 1996

Results
- Champions: Australia
- Runners-up: England
- Third place: South Africa

The 1996 Women's Perrier World Team Squash Championships were held in Petaling Jaya, Malaysia and took place from October 14 until October 19, 1996.

== First round ==
=== Pool A ===
Date	Team One	Team Two	Score
Oct 14	South Africa	United States	3-0
Oct 14	Australia	Germany	3-0
Oct 15	Australia	South Africa	3-0
Oct 15	Germany	United States	3-0
Oct 16	Australia	United States	3-0
Oct 16	South Africa	Germany	2-1

Pos	Nation	Team	P	W	L	Pts
1	Australia	Liz Irving, Michelle Martin, Sarah Fitzgerald, Carol Owens	3	3	0	6
2	South Africa	Claire Nitch, Carla Venter, Angelique Clifton-Parks	3	2	1	4
3	Germany	Sabine Schöne, Sabine Baum, Silke Bartel	3	1	2	2
4	United States	Berkeley Belknap, Demer Holleran, Alicia McConnell, Ellie Pierce	3	0	3	0

=== Pool B ===
Date	Team One	Team Two	Score
Oct 14	England	Egypt	3-0
Oct 14	New Zealand	Netherlands	3-0
Oct 15	England	Netherlands	3-0
Oct 15	New Zealand	Egypt	3-0
Oct 16	England	New Zealand	2-1
Oct 16	Netherlands	Egypt	3-0

Pos	Nation	Team	P	W	L	Pts
1	England	Cassie Jackman, Suzanne Horner, Linda Charman, Fiona Geaves	3	3	0	6
2	New Zealand	Leilani Marsh, Jade Wilson, Philippa Beams, Sarah Cook	3	2	1	4
3	Netherlands	Vanessa Atkinson, Denise Sommers, Daphne Jelgersma	3	1	2	2
4	Egypt	Salma Shabana, Maha Zein, A Abu Oul	3	0	0	3

=== Pool C ===
Date	Team One	Team Two	Score
Oct 14	Canada	Malaysia	2-1
Oct 14	Finland	(Republic of Ireland) Ireland	3-0
Oct 15	(Republic of Ireland) Ireland	Malaysia	3-0
Oct 15	Finland	Canada	2-1
Oct 16	Finland	Malaysia	3-0
Oct 16	Canada	(Republic of Ireland) Ireland	3-0

Pos	Nation	Team	P	W	L	Pts
1	Finland	Nina Taimiaho, Tuula Myllyniemi, Kia Paasivirta, Piia Karonen	3	3	0	6
2	Canada	Heather Wallace, Melanie Jans, Kelsey Soucheraux, Carolyn Russell	3	2	1	4
3	(Republic of Ireland) Ireland	Louise Finnegan, Aisling McArdle, Olivia French, Madeline Perry	3	1	2	2
4	Malaysia	Carrie Yeo Heng Kooi, Leong Siu Lynn, Kuan Choy Lin	3	0	3	3

=== Pool D ===
Date	Team One	Team Two	Score
Oct 14	France	Japan	3-0
Oct 14	Scotland	Hong Kong	3-0
Oct 15	Scotland	Japan	3-0
Oct 15	France	Hong Kong	2-1
Oct 16	Scotland	France	3-0
Oct 16	Hong Kong	Japan	2-1

Pos	Nation	Team	P	W	L	Pts
1	Scotland	Senga Macfie, Pamela Nimmo, Claire Waddell, Wendy Maitland	3	3	0	6
2	France	Corinne Castets, Isabelle Stoehr, Corinne Vézin	3	2	1	4
3	Hong Kong	Dawn Olsen, Rebecca Chiu, Christina Mak	3	1	2	2
4	Japan		3	0	0	3

== Quarter finals ==
Date	Team One	Team Two	Score
Oct 17	Australia	Scotland	3-0
Oct 17	New Zealand	Germany	2-1
Oct 17	South Africa	Netherlands	2-1
Oct 17	England	Finland	3-0

== Semi finals ==
Date	Team One	Team Two	Score
Oct 18	Australia	New Zealand	3-0
Oct 18	England	South Africa	3-0

== Third Place Play Off ==
Team One	Team Two	Score
South Africa	New Zealand	2-1

== Final ==
Australia
2
FINAL
Petaling Jaya, Malaysia
19 October 1996

England
1

			1	2	3	4	5
1	(Australia) (England)	Michelle Martin; Cassie Jackman	3; 9	9; 4	9; 5	7; 9	7; 9
2	(Australia) (England)	Sarah Fitzgerald; Linda Charman	9; 0	9; 1	9; 3
3	(Australia) (England)	Liz Irving; Fiona Geaves	9; 4	9; 4	10; 8

Preceded by Guernsey; 1994	Squash World Team; Malaysia; 1996	Succeeded by Germany; 1998

== See also ==
- World Team Squash Championships
- World Squash Federation
- World Open (squash)
