= List of PSA women's number 1 ranked players =

This article is a list of PSA women's number 1 ranked players in the Women's Squash World Rankings.

The Women's Squash World Rankings are the Professional Squash Association's merit-based method for determining the world rankings in women's squash. The top-ranked player is the player who, over the previous 12 months, has garnered the most PSA ranking points. Points are awarded based on how far a player advances in tournaments and the category of those tournaments. The WISPA, the WSA and the PSA has used a computerized system for determining the rankings since April 1984.

An updated rankings list is released each Monday.

== Number 1 ranked PSA players ==
The statistics are updated only when the PSA website revises its rankings (Monday of every week). In August 2022, PSA changed the world rankings from monthly to weekly.

Key
*	Current number 1
^{↑}	PSA Women's Ranking record

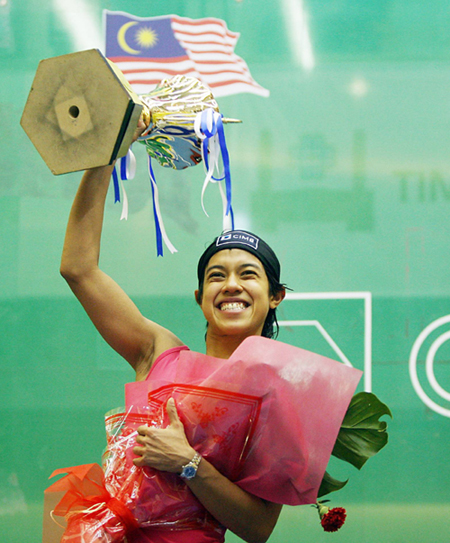
Nicol David has spent a total of 112 months and 109 consecutive months at the top of the women's world rankings, the most of any player.

No.	Country	Name	Start date	End date	Months	Accumulated total (months)	Days	Accumulated total (days)
1	AUS	Vicki Cardwell	April 1983	March 1984	12	**12**	366	**366**
2	NZL	Susan Devoy	April 1984	February 1988	47	47	1430	1430
3	ENG	Lisa Opie	March 1988	April 1988	2	**2**	61	**61**
	NZL	Susan Devoy (2)	May 1988	February 1993	58	**105**	1765	**3195**
4	AUS	Michelle Martin	March 1993	October 1996	44	44	1341	1341
5	AUS	Sarah Fitz-Gerald	November 1996	October 1998	24	24	730	730
	AUS	Michelle Martin (2)	November 1998	December 1999	14	**58**	426	**1767**
6	ENG	Cassie Jackman	January 2000	October 2000	10	10	305	305
7	NZL	Leilani Rorani	November 2000	September 2001	11	**11**	334	**334**
	AUS	Sarah Fitz-Gerald (2)	October 2001	October 2002	13	37	396	1126
8	NZL	Carol Owens	November 2002	November 2002	1	1	30	30
	AUS	Sarah Fitz-Gerald (3)	December 2002	February 2003	3	**40**	90	**1216**
	NZL	Carol Owens (2)	March 2003	May 2003	3	4	92	122
9	USA	Natalie Grainger	June 2003	June 2003	1	**1**	30	30
	NZL	Carol Owens (3)	July 2003	January 2004	7	**11**	215	**337**
	ENG	Cassie Jackman (2)	February 2004	July 2004	6	**16**	182	**487**
10	AUS	Rachael Grinham	August 2004	November 2005	16	**16**	487	**487**
11	NED	Vanessa Atkinson	December 2005	December 2005	1	1	31	31
12	MAS	Nicol David	January 2006	March 2006	3	3	90	90
	NED	Vanessa Atkinson (2)	April 2006	July 2006	4	**5**	122	**153**
	MAS	Nicol David (2)	August 2006	August 2015	109 ^{↑}	**112** ^{↑}	3318 ^{↑}	**3408** ^{↑}
13	EGY	Raneem El Weleily	September 2015	December 2015	4	4	122	122
14	ENG	Laura Massaro	January 2016	April 2016	4	**4**	122	**122**
15	EGY	Nour El Sherbini	May 2016	November 2018	31	31	944	944
	EGY	Raneem El Weleily (2)	December 2018	June 2020	19	**23**	547	**669**
16	EGY	Nouran Gohar	July 2020	October 2020	4	4	123	123
	EGY	Nour El Sherbini (2)	November 2020	March 2022	17	**48**	516	**1460**
	EGY	Nouran Gohar (2)	April 2022	Aug 28, 2022	5	**9**	150	273

No.	Country	Name	Start date	End date	Weeks	Accumulated total	Days	Accumulated total (days)
	EGY	Nouran Gohar	Aug 29, 2022	May 7, 2023	36	**36**	252	**525**
	EGY	Nour El Sherbini (3)	May 8, 2023	Jun 4, 2023	4	**4**	28	**1488**
	EGY	Nouran Gohar (3)	Jun 5, 2023	Sep 3, 2023	13	**51**	91	**616**
	EGY	Nour El Sherbini (4)	Sep 4, 2023	Present (May 19, 2024)	37	**41**	259	**1747**

Accumulated totals are bolded on each player's final streak.

== Days at number 1 ==
Key
**Bold**	The current World No. 1 player
^{‡}	Active players

Rank	Player	Total (months)	Total (weeks)	Total (days)
1.	(Malaysia) Nicol David	112		3408
2.	(New Zealand) Susan Devoy	105		3195
3.	(Australia) Michelle Martin	58		1767
4.	(Egypt) **Nour El Sherbini** ^{‡}	48	41	1747
5	(Australia) Sarah Fitz-Gerald	40		1216
6.	(Egypt) Raneem El Weleily	23		669
7.	(Egypt) Nouran Gohar ^{‡}	9	51	616
8.	(Australia) Rachael Grinham	16		487
=	(England) Cassie Jackman	16		487
10.	(Australia) Vicki Cardwell	12		366
11.	(New Zealand) Carol Owens	11		337
12.	(New Zealand) Leilani Rorani	11		334
13.	(Netherlands) Vanessa Atkinson	5		153
14.	(England) Laura Massaro	4		122
15.	(England) Lisa Opie	2		61
16.	(United States) Natalie Grainger	1		30

Rank	Player	Consecutive days
1.	(Malaysia) Nicol David	**3318** (109 months)
2.	(New Zealand) Susan Devoy	**1765** (58 months)
3.	(Australia) Michelle Martin	**1341** (44 months)
4.	(Egypt) Nour El Sherbini ^{‡}	**944** (31 months)
5.	(Australia) Sarah Fitz-Gerald	**730** (24 months)
6.	(Egypt) Raneem El Weleily	**547** (19 months)
7.	(Australia) Rachael Grinham	**487** (16 months)
8.	(Egypt) Nouran Gohar ^{‡}	**402** (5 months & 36 weeks)
9.	(Australia) Vicki Cardwell	**366** (12 months)
10.	(New Zealand) Leilani Rorani	**334** (11 months)
11.	(England) Cassie Jackman	**305** (10 months)
12.	(New Zealand) Carol Owens	**215** (7 months)
13.	(Netherlands) Vanessa Atkinson	**122** (4 months)
=	(England) Laura Massaro	**122** (4 months)
15.	(England) Lisa Opie	**61** (2 months)
16.	(United States) Natalie Grainger	**30** (1 month)

As 19th of May 2024

Note: Active streak is in bold.

== Days at no. 1 by country ==
	Country	No. of players	No. of months	No. of weeks	No. of days	Players
1.	New Zealand	3	127		3866	Susan Devoy, Leilani Rorani, Carol Owens
2.	Australia	3	126		3836	Vicki Cardwell, Michelle Martin, Sarah Fitz-Gerald, Rachael Grinham
3.	Malaysia	1	112		3408	Nicol David
4.	Egypt	3	80	90	3032	Nour El Sherbini, Raneem El Weleily, Nouran Gohar
5.	England	3	22		560	Cassie Jackman, Laura Massaro, Lisa Opie
6.	Netherlands	1	5		153	Vanessa Atkinson
7.	United States	1	1		30	Natalie Grainger

As 19th of May 2024

== Players who were ranked World no. 1 without having won a World Championship ==
Key
^{‡}	Active players

Player	First No. 1 position Date	Num. of days No. 1	First World Championship final	Number of finals
(England) Lisa Opie	1st of March 1988	61 (2 months)	1985 (vs. (New Zealand) Susan Devoy)	2
(New Zealand) Leilani Rorani	1st of November 2000	334 (11 months)	2000 (vs. (New Zealand) Carol Owens)	2
(United States) Natalie Grainger	1st of June 2003	30 (1 month)	2002 (vs. (Australia) Sarah Fitz-Gerald)	1

As 19th of May 2024

== See also ==
- PSA Awards
- Women's Squash World Rankings
- PSA World Tour
- List of PSA men's number 1 ranked players
- Men's Squash World Rankings
