= Women's Squash World Rankings =

The Women's Squash World Rankings are the official world rankings for women's squash. The WISPA, the WSA and the PSA has used a computerized system for determining the rankings since April 1984. The ranking is to rate the performance level of female professional squash players. It is also a merit-based method used for determining entry and seeding in women's squash tournaments. The rankings were initially produced monthly; this has been changed to weekly basis effective ranking issue dated August 29, 2022.

The current world number one is Nouran Gohar of Egypt, who replaced Nour El Sherbini in September 2023, and then Hania El Hammamy in November 2025.

== Ranking policy ==
Players competing in PSA tournaments earn ranking points according to how far they get in the draw. The points available depend on the prize money and the draw size. The weekly rankings (issued on each Monday) are used in selecting entries to tournaments and in determining the seeds.

Ranking points for each players are made up of a cumulative total consisting of the top 9 tournament results. For instance, if a player has played in 14 events over the course of the period eligible for rankings points, only their best 9 results (in terms of points earned) will count towards their ranking.

Players competing in PSA World Tour Events earn ranking points according to the prize money, classification of the event, and the final position in the draw the player reaches.

Tournament			Ranking Points						
Rank	Prize Money US$	Ranking Points	Winner	Runner up	3/4	5/8	9/16	17/32	33/48
World Championship	$600,000	27683 points	3500	2275	1400	875	525	321	196
Diamond	$300,000	24511 points	3100	2015	1240	775	465	284	173.5
Platinum	$190,000	17132 points	2800	1820	1120	700	420	257	
Gold	$100,000	11010 points	1800	1170	720	450	270	165	
Silver	$75,000	8261.5 points	1350	877.5	540	337.5	202.5	124	
Bronze	$50,000	5505 points	900	585	360	225	135	82.5	
Copper	$25,000	3061 points	500	325	200	125	75	46	
PSA Challenger Tour			Ranking Points						
Rank	Prize money US$	Ranking Points	Winner	Runner up	3/4	5/8	9/16	17/32	33/48
Challenger 30	$30,000	2814 points	525	345	210	130	78	47.5	
Challenger 20	$20,000	1860 points	350	230	140	85	51	31.5	
Challenger 15	$15,000	1343 points	250	162.5	100	62.5	37.5	22.5	
Challenger 12	$12,000	1074 points	200	130	80	50	30	18	
Challenger 9	$9,000	806 points	150	97.5	60	37.5	22.5	13.5	
Challenger 6	$6,000	537 points	100	65	40	25	15	9	
Challenger 3	$3,000	331 points	65	40	25	15	9	5.5	

== Current world rankings ==
PSA Women's World Rankings, of the 5 January 2026
Rank	Player	Average	Move^{†}
1	Hania El Hammamy (EGY)	1,791	Steady
2	Nouran Gohar (EGY)	1,578	Steady
3	Amina Orfi (EGY)	1,455	Steady
4	Nour El Sherbini (EGY)	1,324	Steady
5	Olivia Weaver (USA)	1,284	Steady
6	Satomi Watanabe (JPN)	881	Steady
7	Sivasangari Subramaniam (MAS)	869	Steady
8	Tinne Gilis (BEL)	755	Steady
9	Fayrouz Aboelkheir (EGY)	753	Steady
10	Georgina Kennedy (ENG)	741	Steady

Note: The weekly ranking for the women's squash (world ranking) is taken directly from the Professional Squash Association (PSA) official website.

== World number 1 since 1983 ==
=== Number one ranked players ===
The following is a list of players who have achieved the world number one position since April 1983 (active players in green) :

#	Player	Date reached	Total months	Total weeks	Total days
1	(Australia) Vicki Cardwell	April 1983	12		366
2	(New Zealand) Susan Devoy	April 1984	105		3195
3	(England) Lisa Opie	March 1988	2		61
4	(Australia) Michelle Martin	March 1993	58		1767
5	(Australia) Sarah Fitz-Gerald	November 1996	40		1216
6	(England) Cassie Jackman	January 2000	16		487
7	(New Zealand) Leilani Rorani	November 2000	11		334
8	(New Zealand) Carol Owens	November 2002	11		307
9	(United States) Natalie Grainger	June 2003	1		30
10	(Australia) Rachael Grinham	August 2004	16		487
11	(Netherlands) Vanessa Atkinson	December 2005	5		153
12	(Malaysia) Nicol David	January 2006	112		3408
13	(Egypt) Raneem El Weleily	September 2015	23		669
14	(England) Laura Massaro	January 2016	4		122
15	(Egypt) Nour El Sherbini	May 2016	48	41	1747
16	(Egypt) Nouran Gohar	July 2020	9	51	616

Last update: 19th of May 2024

=== 2021–2024 ===
Month	2021	2022	2023	2024
January	(Egypt) Nour El Sherbini	(Egypt) Nour El Sherbini	(Egypt) Nouran Gohar	(Egypt) Nour El Sherbini
February	(Egypt) Nour El Sherbini	(Egypt) Nour El Sherbini	(Egypt) Nouran Gohar	(Egypt) Nour El Sherbini
March	(Egypt) Nour El Sherbini	(Egypt) Nour El Sherbini	(Egypt) Nouran Gohar	(Egypt) Nour El Sherbini
April	(Egypt) Nour El Sherbini	(Egypt) Nouran Gohar	(Egypt) Nouran Gohar	(Egypt) Nour El Sherbini
May	(Egypt) Nour El Sherbini	(Egypt) Nouran Gohar	(Egypt) N Gohar then (Egypt) N El Sherbini	(Egypt) Nour El Sherbini
June	(Egypt) Nour El Sherbini	(Egypt) Nouran Gohar	(Egypt) N El Sherbini then (Egypt) N Gohar	
July	(Egypt) Nour El Sherbini	(Egypt) Nouran Gohar	(Egypt) Nouran Gohar	
August	(Egypt) Nour El Sherbini	(Egypt) Nouran Gohar	(Egypt) Nouran Gohar	
September	(Egypt) Nour El Sherbini	(Egypt) Nouran Gohar	(Egypt) Nour El Sherbini	
October	(Egypt) Nour El Sherbini	(Egypt) Nouran Gohar	(Egypt) Nour El Sherbini	
November	(Egypt) Nour El Sherbini	(Egypt) Nouran Gohar	(Egypt) Nour El Sherbini	
December	(Egypt) Nour El Sherbini	(Egypt) Nouran Gohar	(Egypt) Nour El Sherbini	

=== 2017–2020 ===
Month	2017	2018	2019	2020
January	(Egypt) Nour El Sherbini	(Egypt) Nour El Sherbini	(Egypt) Raneem El Weleily	(Egypt) Raneem El Weleily
February	(Egypt) Nour El Sherbini	(Egypt) Nour El Sherbini	(Egypt) Raneem El Weleily	(Egypt) Raneem El Weleily
March	(Egypt) Nour El Sherbini	(Egypt) Nour El Sherbini	(Egypt) Raneem El Weleily	(Egypt) Raneem El Weleily
April	(Egypt) Nour El Sherbini	(Egypt) Nour El Sherbini	(Egypt) Raneem El Weleily	(Egypt) Raneem El Weleily
May	(Egypt) Nour El Sherbini	(Egypt) Nour El Sherbini	(Egypt) Raneem El Weleily	(Egypt) Raneem El Weleily
June	(Egypt) Nour El Sherbini	(Egypt) Nour El Sherbini	(Egypt) Raneem El Weleily	(Egypt) Raneem El Weleily
July	(Egypt) Nour El Sherbini	(Egypt) Nour El Sherbini	(Egypt) Raneem El Weleily	(Egypt) Nouran Gohar
August	(Egypt) Nour El Sherbini	(Egypt) Nour El Sherbini	(Egypt) Raneem El Weleily	(Egypt) Nouran Gohar
September	(Egypt) Nour El Sherbini	(Egypt) Nour El Sherbini	(Egypt) Raneem El Weleily	(Egypt) Nouran Gohar
October	(Egypt) Nour El Sherbini	(Egypt) Nour El Sherbini	(Egypt) Raneem El Weleily	(Egypt) Nouran Gohar
November	(Egypt) Nour El Sherbini	(Egypt) Nour El Sherbini	(Egypt) Raneem El Weleily	(Egypt) Nour El Sherbini
December	(Egypt) Nour El Sherbini	(Egypt) Raneem El Weleily	(Egypt) Raneem El Weleily	(Egypt) Nour El Sherbini

=== 2013–2016 ===
Month	2013	2014	2015	2016
January	(Malaysia) Nicol David	(Malaysia) Nicol David	(Malaysia) Nicol David	(England) Laura Massaro
February	(Malaysia) Nicol David	(Malaysia) Nicol David	(Malaysia) Nicol David	(England) Laura Massaro
March	(Malaysia) Nicol David	(Malaysia) Nicol David	(Malaysia) Nicol David	(England) Laura Massaro
April	(Malaysia) Nicol David	(Malaysia) Nicol David	(Malaysia) Nicol David	(England) Laura Massaro
May	(Malaysia) Nicol David	(Malaysia) Nicol David	(Malaysia) Nicol David	(Egypt) Nour El Sherbini
June	(Malaysia) Nicol David	(Malaysia) Nicol David	(Malaysia) Nicol David	(Egypt) Nour El Sherbini
July	(Malaysia) Nicol David	(Malaysia) Nicol David	(Malaysia) Nicol David	(Egypt) Nour El Sherbini
August	(Malaysia) Nicol David	(Malaysia) Nicol David	(Malaysia) Nicol David	(Egypt) Nour El Sherbini
September	(Malaysia) Nicol David	(Malaysia) Nicol David	(Egypt) Raneem El Weleily	(Egypt) Nour El Sherbini
October	(Malaysia) Nicol David	(Malaysia) Nicol David	(Egypt) Raneem El Weleily	(Egypt) Nour El Sherbini
November	(Malaysia) Nicol David	(Malaysia) Nicol David	(Egypt) Raneem El Weleily	(Egypt) Nour El Sherbini
December	(Malaysia) Nicol David	(Malaysia) Nicol David	(Egypt) Raneem El Weleily	(Egypt) Nour El Sherbini

=== 2009–2012 ===
Month	2009	2010	2011	2012
January	(Malaysia) Nicol David	(Malaysia) Nicol David	(Malaysia) Nicol David	(Malaysia) Nicol David
February	(Malaysia) Nicol David	(Malaysia) Nicol David	(Malaysia) Nicol David	(Malaysia) Nicol David
March	(Malaysia) Nicol David	(Malaysia) Nicol David	(Malaysia) Nicol David	(Malaysia) Nicol David
April	(Malaysia) Nicol David	(Malaysia) Nicol David	(Malaysia) Nicol David	(Malaysia) Nicol David
May	(Malaysia) Nicol David	(Malaysia) Nicol David	(Malaysia) Nicol David	(Malaysia) Nicol David
June	(Malaysia) Nicol David	(Malaysia) Nicol David	(Malaysia) Nicol David	(Malaysia) Nicol David
July	(Malaysia) Nicol David	(Malaysia) Nicol David	(Malaysia) Nicol David	(Malaysia) Nicol David
August	(Malaysia) Nicol David	(Malaysia) Nicol David	(Malaysia) Nicol David	(Malaysia) Nicol David
September	(Malaysia) Nicol David	(Malaysia) Nicol David	(Malaysia) Nicol David	(Malaysia) Nicol David
October	(Malaysia) Nicol David	(Malaysia) Nicol David	(Malaysia) Nicol David	(Malaysia) Nicol David
November	(Malaysia) Nicol David	(Malaysia) Nicol David	(Malaysia) Nicol David	(Malaysia) Nicol David
December	(Malaysia) Nicol David	(Malaysia) Nicol David	(Malaysia) Nicol David	(Malaysia) Nicol David

=== 2005–2008 ===
Month	2005	2006	2007	2008
January	(Australia) Rachael Grinham	(Malaysia) Nicol David	(Malaysia) Nicol David	(Malaysia) Nicol David
February	(Australia) Rachael Grinham	(Malaysia) Nicol David	(Malaysia) Nicol David	(Malaysia) Nicol David
March	(Australia) Rachael Grinham	(Malaysia) Nicol David	(Malaysia) Nicol David	(Malaysia) Nicol David
April	(Australia) Rachael Grinham	(Netherlands) Vanessa Atkinson	(Malaysia) Nicol David	(Malaysia) Nicol David
May	(Australia) Rachael Grinham	(Netherlands) Vanessa Atkinson	(Malaysia) Nicol David	(Malaysia) Nicol David
June	(Australia) Rachael Grinham	(Netherlands) Vanessa Atkinson	(Malaysia) Nicol David	(Malaysia) Nicol David
July	(Australia) Rachael Grinham	(Netherlands) Vanessa Atkinson	(Malaysia) Nicol David	(Malaysia) Nicol David
August	(Australia) Rachael Grinham	(Malaysia) Nicol David	(Malaysia) Nicol David	(Malaysia) Nicol David
September	(Australia) Rachael Grinham	(Malaysia) Nicol David	(Malaysia) Nicol David	(Malaysia) Nicol David
October	(Australia) Rachael Grinham	(Malaysia) Nicol David	(Malaysia) Nicol David	(Malaysia) Nicol David
November	(Australia) Rachael Grinham	(Malaysia) Nicol David	(Malaysia) Nicol David	(Malaysia) Nicol David
December	(Netherlands) Vanessa Atkinson	(Malaysia) Nicol David	(Malaysia) Nicol David	(Malaysia) Nicol David

=== 2001–2004 ===
Month	2001	2002	2003	2004
January	(New Zealand) Leilani Rorani	(Australia) Sarah Fitz-Gerald	(Australia) Sarah Fitz-Gerald	(New Zealand) Carol Owens
February	(New Zealand) Leilani Rorani	(Australia) Sarah Fitz-Gerald	(Australia) Sarah Fitz-Gerald	(England) Cassie Jackman
March	(New Zealand) Leilani Rorani	(Australia) Sarah Fitz-Gerald	(New Zealand) Carol Owens	(England) Cassie Jackman
April	(New Zealand) Leilani Rorani	(Australia) Sarah Fitz-Gerald	(New Zealand) Carol Owens	(England) Cassie Jackman
May	(New Zealand) Leilani Rorani	(Australia) Sarah Fitz-Gerald	(New Zealand) Carol Owens	(England) Cassie Jackman
June	(New Zealand) Leilani Rorani	(Australia) Sarah Fitz-Gerald	(United States) Natalie Grainger	(England) Cassie Jackman
July	(New Zealand) Leilani Rorani	(Australia) Sarah Fitz-Gerald	(New Zealand) Carol Owens	(England) Cassie Jackman
August	(New Zealand) Leilani Rorani	(Australia) Sarah Fitz-Gerald	(New Zealand) Carol Owens	(Australia) Rachael Grinham
September	(New Zealand) Leilani Rorani	(Australia) Sarah Fitz-Gerald	(New Zealand) Carol Owens	(Australia) Rachael Grinham
October	(Australia) Sarah Fitz-Gerald	(Australia) Sarah Fitz-Gerald	(New Zealand) Carol Owens	(Australia) Rachael Grinham
November	(Australia) Sarah Fitz-Gerald	(New Zealand) Carol Owens	(New Zealand) Carol Owens	(Australia) Rachael Grinham
December	(Australia) Sarah Fitz-Gerald	(Australia) Sarah Fitz-Gerald	(New Zealand) Carol Owens	(Australia) Rachael Grinham

=== 1997–2000 ===
Month	1997	1998	1999	2000
January	(Australia) Sarah Fitz-Gerald	(Australia) Sarah Fitz-Gerald	(Australia) Michelle Martin	(England) Cassie Jackman
March	(Australia) Sarah Fitz-Gerald	(Australia) Sarah Fitz-Gerald	(Australia) Michelle Martin	(England) Cassie Jackman
May	(Australia) Sarah Fitz-Gerald	(Australia) Sarah Fitz-Gerald	(Australia) Michelle Martin	(England) Cassie Jackman
July	(Australia) Sarah Fitz-Gerald	(Australia) Sarah Fitz-Gerald	(Australia) Michelle Martin	(England) Cassie Jackman
September	(Australia) Sarah Fitz-Gerald	(Australia) Sarah Fitz-Gerald	(Australia) Michelle Martin	(England) Cassie Jackman
November	(Australia) Sarah Fitz-Gerald	(Australia) Michelle Martin	(Australia) Michelle Martin	(New Zealand) Leilani Rorani

=== 1993–1996 ===
Month	1993	1994	1995	1996
January	(New Zealand) Susan Devoy	(Australia) Michelle Martin	(Australia) Michelle Martin	(Australia) Michelle Martin
March	(Australia) Michelle Martin	(Australia) Michelle Martin	(Australia) Michelle Martin	(Australia) Michelle Martin
May	(Australia) Michelle Martin	(Australia) Michelle Martin	(Australia) Michelle Martin	(Australia) Michelle Martin
July	(Australia) Michelle Martin	(Australia) Michelle Martin	(Australia) Michelle Martin	(Australia) Michelle Martin
September	(Australia) Michelle Martin	(Australia) Michelle Martin	(Australia) Michelle Martin	(Australia) Michelle Martin
November	(Australia) Michelle Martin	(Australia) Michelle Martin	(Australia) Michelle Martin	(Australia) Sarah Fitz-Gerald

=== 1989–1992 ===
Month	1989	1990	1991	1992
January	(New Zealand) Susan Devoy	(New Zealand) Susan Devoy	(New Zealand) Susan Devoy	(New Zealand) Susan Devoy
April	(New Zealand) Susan Devoy	(New Zealand) Susan Devoy	(New Zealand) Susan Devoy	(New Zealand) Susan Devoy
July	(New Zealand) Susan Devoy	(New Zealand) Susan Devoy	(New Zealand) Susan Devoy	(New Zealand) Susan Devoy
October	(New Zealand) Susan Devoy	(New Zealand) Susan Devoy	(New Zealand) Susan Devoy	(New Zealand) Susan Devoy

=== 1986–1988 ===
Month	1986	1987	1988
January	(New Zealand) Susan Devoy	(New Zealand) Susan Devoy	(New Zealand) Susan Devoy
March	(New Zealand) Susan Devoy	(New Zealand) Susan Devoy	(England) Lisa Opie
May	(New Zealand) Susan Devoy	(New Zealand) Susan Devoy	(New Zealand) Susan Devoy
July	(New Zealand) Susan Devoy	(New Zealand) Susan Devoy	(New Zealand) Susan Devoy
September	(New Zealand) Susan Devoy	(New Zealand) Susan Devoy	(New Zealand) Susan Devoy
November	(New Zealand) Susan Devoy	(New Zealand) Susan Devoy	(New Zealand) Susan Devoy

=== 1983–1985 ===
Month	1983	1984	1985
January		(Australia) Vicki Cardwell	(New Zealand) Susan Devoy
April	(Australia) Vicki Cardwell	(New Zealand) Susan Devoy	(New Zealand) Susan Devoy
July	(Australia) Vicki Cardwell	(New Zealand) Susan Devoy	(New Zealand) Susan Devoy
October	(Australia) Vicki Cardwell	(New Zealand) Susan Devoy	(New Zealand) Susan Devoy

== Year-end top 10 ==
=== 2021-2023 ===
Rank	2021		2022		2023
1	(Egypt) Nour El Sherbini	1963	(Egypt) Nouran Gohar	2252	
2	(Egypt) Nouran Gohar	1739	(Egypt) Nour El Sherbini	1792	
3	(United States) Amanda Sobhy	1153	(Egypt) Hania El Hammamy	1784	
4	(Egypt) Hania El Hammamy	1112	(New Zealand) Joelle King	1169	
5	(England) Sarah-Jane Perry	887	(United States) Amanda Sobhy	1011	
6	(France) Camille Serme	709	(Egypt) Nour El Tayeb	963	
7	(New Zealand) Joelle King	700	(Egypt) Rowan Elaraby	707	
8	(Egypt) Salma Hany	657	(England) Sarah-Jane Perry	679	
9	(Egypt) Nour El Tayeb	506	(Belgium) Nele Gilis	583	
10	(Egypt) Rowan Elaraby	479	(United States) Olivia Fiechter	555	

=== 2018-2020 ===
Rank	2018		2019		2020	
1	(Egypt) Raneem El Weleily	1903	(Egypt) Raneem El Weleily	1891	(Egypt) Nour El Sherbini	1716
2	(Egypt) Nour El Sherbini	1703	(Egypt) Nour El Sherbini	1433	(Egypt) Nouran Gohar	1591
3	(Egypt) Nour El Tayeb	1166	(Egypt) Nouran Gohar	1359	(Egypt) Nour El Tayeb	1304
4	(New Zealand) Joelle King	914	(Egypt) Nour El Tayeb	1317	(France) Camille Serme	1236
5	(France) Camille Serme	871	(France) Camille Serme	1134	(Egypt) Hania El Hammamy	1037
6	(England) Sarah-Jane Perry	775	(New Zealand) Joelle King	755	(England) Sarah-Jane Perry	806
7	(Egypt) Nouran Gohar	658	(United States) Amanda Sobhy	632	(United States) Amanda Sobhy	750
8	(England) Laura Massaro	623	(England) Sarah-Jane Perry	612	(New Zealand) Joelle King	737
9	(Wales) Tesni Evans	494	(Wales) Tesni Evans	555	(Wales) Tesni Evans	482
10	(England) Alison Waters	472	(Egypt) Hania El Hammamy	524	(Egypt) Salma Hany	449

=== 2015-2017 ===
Rank	2015		2016		2017	
1	(Egypt) Raneem El Weleily	2831.765	(Egypt) Nour El Sherbini	1833	(Egypt) Nour El Sherbini	1576
2	(England) Laura Massaro	2553.529	(Egypt) Raneem El Weleily	1204	(Egypt) Raneem El Weleily	1216
3	(Malaysia) Nicol David	2396.250	(Egypt) Nouran Gohar	1160	(France) Camille Serme	1059
4	(France) Camille Serme	1784.375	(England) Laura Massaro	1087	(England) Laura Massaro	1049
5	(Egypt) Omneya Abdel Kawy	1462.500	(France) Camille Serme	1028	(Egypt) Nouran Gohar	793
6	(Egypt) Nour El Sherbini	1430.000	(Malaysia) Nicol David	1023	(Malaysia) Nicol David	738
7	(Egypt) Nour El Tayeb	1340.625	(United States) Amanda Sobhy	962	(England) Sarah-Jane Perry	713
8	(England) Alison Waters	1175.625	(Egypt) Omneya Abdel Kawy	608	(Egypt) Nour El Tayeb	656
9	(Egypt) Nouran Gohar	827.059	(England) Alison Waters	503	(New Zealand) Joelle King	571
10	(Hong Kong) Annie Au	815.789	(New Zealand) Joelle King	481	(England) Alison Waters	492

=== 2012-2014 ===
Rank	2012		2013		2014	
1	(Malaysia) Nicol David	2415.625	(Malaysia) Nicol David	3499.380	(Malaysia) Nicol David	3398.120
2	(Egypt) Raneem El Weleily	1670.000	(England) Laura Massaro	2278.940	(England) Laura Massaro	2088.530
3	(England) Laura Massaro	1430.250	(Egypt) Raneem El Weleily	1656.250	(Egypt) Raneem El Weleily	1984.120
4	(England) Alison Waters	1049.789	(England) Alison Waters	1185.940	(Egypt) Nour El Sherbini	1362.310
5	(New Zealand) Joelle King	1043.412	(France) Camille Serme	1071.880	(England) Alison Waters	1248.890
6	(Egypt) Nour El Sherbini	943.281	(New Zealand) Joelle King	1040.290	(France) Camille Serme	1084.130
7	(Malaysia) Low Wee Wern	865.556	(England) Jenny Duncalf	952.941	(Malaysia) Low Wee Wern	1033.160
8	(Hong Kong) Annie Au	840.222	(Malaysia) Low Wee Wern	904.706	(Egypt) Nour El Tayeb	1000.500
9	(Republic of Ireland) Madeline Perry	736.105	(Netherlands) Natalie Grinham	902.294	(Hong Kong) Annie Au	857.250
10	(India) Dipika Pallikal	608.912	(Republic of Ireland) Madeline Perry	867.579	(Egypt) Omneya Abdel Kawy	788.571

=== 2009-2011 ===
Rank	2009		2010		2011	
1	(Malaysia) Nicol David	2692.778	(Malaysia) Nicol David	3340.000	(Malaysia) Nicol David	3279.412
2	(England) Jenny Duncalf	1474.955	(England) Jenny Duncalf	1621.765	(England) Jenny Duncalf	1934.118
3	(Netherlands) Natalie Grinham	1469.389	(England) Alison Waters	1480.625	(England) Laura Massaro	1411.765
4	(Australia) Rachael Grinham	1324.000	(Egypt) Omneya Abdel Kawy	1292.353	(Republic of Ireland) Madeline Perry	1409.200
5	(United States) Natalie Grainger	1258.125	(Australia) Rachael Grinham	1166.000	(Australia) Kasey Brown	1111.667
6	(England) Alison Waters	1256.579	(Republic of Ireland) Madeline Perry	1005.800	(Australia) Rachael Grinham	1078.524
7	(Egypt) Omneya Abdel Kawy	989.238	(Australia) Kasey Brown	882.381	(Egypt) Raneem El Weleily	1022.789
8	(Republic of Ireland) Madeline Perry	949.333	(Netherlands) Vanessa Atkinson	790.059	(Hong Kong) Annie Au	948.952
9	(England) Laura Lengthorn-Massaro	908.025	(England) Laura Massaro	770.211	(Netherlands) Natalie Grinham	920.889
10	(Netherlands) Vanessa Atkinson	516.211	(France) Camille Serme	769.895	(France) Camille Serme	877.175

=== 2006–2008 ===
Rank	2006		2007		2008	
1	(Malaysia) Nicol David	3057.188	(Malaysia) Nicol David	3057.222	(Malaysia) Nicol David	3542.353
2	(Australia) Rachael Grinham	1650.889	(Australia) Natalie Grinham	2425.238	(Netherlands) Natalie Grinham	1678.824
3	(Netherlands) Vanessa Atkinson	1279.375	(Australia) Rachael Grinham	1874.545	(Australia) Rachael Grinham	1398.524
4	(Australia) Natalie Grinham	1208.750	(United States) Natalie Grainger	1572.045	(United States) Natalie Grainger	1237.941
5	(England) Tania Bailey	1140.882	(England) Tania Bailey	1231.579	(England) Alison Waters	965.722
6	(Republic of Ireland) Madeline Perry	844.063	(England) Vicky Botwright	1008.810	(England) Jenny Duncalf	960.444
7	(United States) Natalie Grainger	789.906	(England) Jenny Duncalf	877.609	(Egypt) Omneya Abdel Kawy	904.211
8	(England) Vicky Botwright	789.684	(Netherlands) Vanessa Atkinson	831.250	(England) Laura Lengthorn-Massaro	847.900
9	(England) Jenny Duncalf	752.222	(Egypt) Omneya Abdel Kawy	817.000	(Republic of Ireland) Madeline Perry	761.700
10	(Egypt) Omneya Abdel Kawy	734.421	(New Zealand) Shelley Kitchen	742.107	(New Zealand) Shelley Kitchen	710.474

Note:
1) Natalie Grinham changed her nationality in 2008.

=== 2003–2005 ===
Rank	2003		2004		2005	
1	(New Zealand) Carol Owens	1270.938	(Australia) Rachael Grinham	2039.118	(Netherlands) Vanessa Atkinson	2409.000
2	(England) Cassie Jackman	955.026	(England) Cassie Jackman	1783.053	(Australia) Rachael Grinham	1817.368
3	(Australia) Rachael Grinham	782.063	(Netherlands) Vanessa Atkinson	1530.667	(Malaysia) Nicol David	1747.105
4	(Australia) Natalie Grinham	723.500	(United States) Natalie Grainger	1321.353	(Australia) Natalie Grinham	1356.250
5	(United States) Natalie Grainger	699.000	(Australia) Natalie Grinham	1019.941	(England) Vicky Botwright	1042.833
6	(England) Linda Elriani	675.588	(Malaysia) Nicol David	834.789	(England) Linda Elriani	894.000
7	(Netherlands) Vanessa Atkinson	653.125	(England) Linda Elriani	752.636	(United States) Natalie Grainger	872.353
8	(England) Rebecca Macree	535.658	(England) Fiona Geaves	669.750	(England) Jenny Duncalf	664.450
9	(England) Vicky Botwright	421.737	(Egypt) Omneya Abdel Kawy	607.635	(England) Tania Bailey	646.765
10	(England) Stephanie Brind	358.147	(England) Rebecca Macree	582.409	(Egypt) Omneya Abdel Kawy	604.478

=== 2000–2002 ===
Rank	2000		2001		2002	
1	(New Zealand) Leilani Rorani	2326.625	(Australia) Sarah Fitz-Gerald	2611.667	(Australia) Sarah Fitz-Gerald	2078.750
2	(New Zealand) Carol Owens	1681.000	(New Zealand) Leilani Rorani	1537.750	(New Zealand) Carol Owens	1745.278
3	(England) Linda Elriani	988.111	(New Zealand) Carol Owens	1291.563	(United States) Natalie Grainger	1389.050
4	(Australia) Sarah Fitz-Gerald	912.500	(England) Cassie Jackman	913.688	(England) Linda Elriani	972.688
5	(England) Tania Bailey	812.938	(England) Fiona Geaves	853.500	(England) Tania Bailey	908.139
6	(United States) Natalie Grainger	804.111	(England) Linda Elriani	843.375	(Australia) Rachael Grinham	879.667
7	(England) Suzanne Horner	742.500	(England) Stephanie Brind	802.875	(Netherlands) Vanessa Atkinson	876.750
8	(England) Cassie Jackman	741.250	(Australia) Rachael Grinham	693.222	(England) Cassie Jackman	848.750
9	(England) Fiona Geaves	602.438	(England) Suzanne Horner	676.944	(England) Rebecca Macree	592.300
10	(England) Stephanie Brind	566.833	(England) Rebecca Macree	564.861	(England) Fiona Geaves	572.278

=== 1997–1999 ===
Rank	1997	1998		1999	
1	(Australia) Sarah Fitz-Gerald	(Australia) Michelle Martin	1973.000	(New Zealand) Leilani Rorani	2326.625
2	(Australia) Michelle Martin	(Australia) Sarah Fitz-Gerald	1531.818	(New Zealand) Carol Owens	1681.000
3	(England) Cassie Jackman	(England) Cassie Jackman	1128.750	(England) Linda Elriani	988.111
4	(England) Sue Wright	(England) Sue Wright	945.000	(Australia) Sarah Fitz-Gerald	912.500
5	(New Zealand) Carol Owens	(England) Suzanne Horner	696.111	(England) Tania Bailey	812.938
6	(Germany) Sabine Schoene	(England) Linda Elriani	565.833	(United States) Natalie Grainger	804.111
7	(England) Suzanne Horner	(New Zealand) Leilani Rorani	560.227	(England) Suzanne Horner	742.500
8	(England) Liz Irving	(New Zealand) Carol Owens	544.722	(England) Cassie Jackman	741.250
9	(England) Linda Elriani	(Germany) Sabine Schoene	539.167	(England) Fiona Geaves	602.438
10	(England) Fiona Geaves	(Australia) Liz Irving	508.889	(England) Stephanie Brind	566.833

=== 1994–1996 ===
Rank	1994	1995	1996
1	(Australia) Michelle Martin	(Australia) Michelle Martin	(Australia) Sarah Fitz-Gerald
2	(England) Suzanne Horner	(Australia) Sarah Fitz-Gerald	(Australia) Michelle Martin
3	(England) Cassie Jackman	(Australia) Liz Irving	(England) Cassie Jackman
4	(Australia) Liz Irving	(England) Suzanne Horner	(England) Suzanne Horner
5	(Australia) Sarah Fitz-Gerald	(New Zealand) Carol Owens	(England) Sue Wright
6	(New Zealand) Carol Owens	(England) Cassie Jackman	(Australia) Liz Irving
7	(England) Fiona Geaves	(Germany) Sabine Schoene	(New Zealand) Carol Owens
8	(England) Sue Wright	(England) Fiona Geaves	(Germany) Sabine Schoene
9	(South Africa) Claire Nitch	(England) Jane Martin	(South Africa) Claire Nitch
10	(England) Jane Martin	(South Africa) Claire Nitch	(England) Fiona Geaves

== Year-end number 1 ==
Years ended No. 1
Player	Count
Nicol David	9
Susan Devoy	9
Michelle Martin	5
Sarah Fitz-Gerald	4
Nour El Sherbini	4
Raneem El Weleily	3
Vanessa Atkinson	1
Vicki Cardwell	1
Nohar Gohar	1
Rachael Grinham	1
Carol Owens	1
Leilani Rorani	1

- 1983: (Australia) Vicki Cardwell
- 1984: (New Zealand) Susan Devoy
- 1985: (New Zealand) Susan Devoy (2)
- 1986: (New Zealand) Susan Devoy (3)
- 1987: (New Zealand) Susan Devoy (4)
- 1988: (New Zealand) Susan Devoy (5)
- 1989: (New Zealand) Susan Devoy (6)
- 1990: (New Zealand) Susan Devoy (7)
- 1991: (New Zealand) Susan Devoy (8)
- 1992: (New Zealand) Susan Devoy (9)
- 1993: (Australia) Michelle Martin
- 1994: (Australia) Michelle Martin (2)
- 1995: (Australia) Michelle Martin (3)
- 1996: (Australia) Sarah Fitz-Gerald
- 1997: (Australia) Sarah Fitz-Gerald (2)
- 1998: (Australia) Michelle Martin (4)
- 1999: (New Zealand) Leilani Rorani
- 2000: (New Zealand) Leilani Rorani (2)
- 2001: (Australia) Sarah Fitz-Gerald (3)
- 2002: (Australia) Sarah Fitz-Gerald (4)
- 2003: (New Zealand) Carol Owens
- 2004: (Australia) Rachael Grinham
- 2005: (Netherlands) Vanessa Atkinson
- 2006: (Malaysia) Nicol David
- 2007: (Malaysia) Nicol David (2)
- 2008: (Malaysia) Nicol David (3)
- 2009: (Malaysia) Nicol David (4)
- 2010: (Malaysia) Nicol David (5)
- 2011: (Malaysia) Nicol David (6)
- 2012: (Malaysia) Nicol David (7)
- 2013: (Malaysia) Nicol David (8)
- 2014: (Malaysia) Nicol David (9)
- 2015: (Egypt) Raneem El Weleily
- 2016: (Egypt) Nour El Sherbini
- 2017: (Egypt) Nour El Sherbini (2)
- 2018: (Egypt) Raneem El Weleily (2)
- 2019: (Egypt) Raneem El Weleily (3)
- 2020: (Egypt) Nour El Sherbini (3)
- 2021: (Egypt) Nour El Sherbini (4)
- 2022: (Egypt) Nouran Gohar

== See also ==
- List of PSA women's number 1 ranked players
- PSA Awards
- PSA World Tour
- Official Men's Squash World Ranking
- List of PSA men's number 1 ranked players
