= Sarah Fitz-Gerald =

Australian squash player

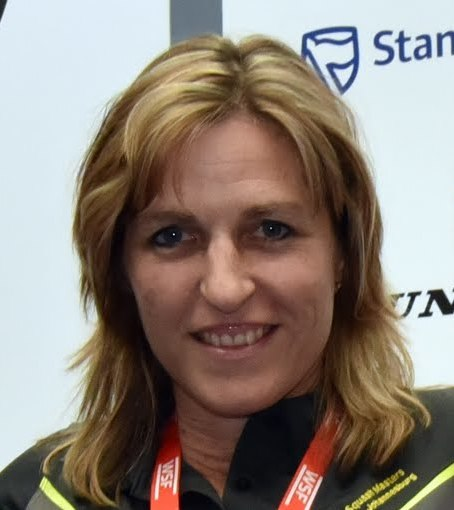
- Fitz-Gerald in 2015

Personal information
- Born: Sarah Elizabeth Fitz-Gerald; 1 December 1968 (age 57) Melbourne, Australia

Sport
- Country: Australia
- Turned pro: 1988
- Coached by: Roger Flynn & Mike Johnson
- Retired: 2003
- Racquet used: Dunlop

Women's singles
- Highest ranking: 1 (November 1996)
Medal record
Women's squash
Representing Australia
World Championships
Gold medal – first place	1996 Petaling Jaya	Singles
Gold medal – first place	1997 Sydney	Singles
Gold medal – first place	1998 Stuttgart	Singles
Gold medal – first place	2001 Melbourne	Singles
Gold medal – first place	2002 Doha	Singles
Silver medal – second place	1995 Hong Kong	Singles
Bronze medal – third place	1989 Warmond	Singles
Bronze medal – third place	2000 Edinburgh	Singles
World Team Championships
Silver medal – second place	1987 Auckland	Team
Gold medal – first place	1992 Vancouver	Team
Gold medal – first place	1994 Guernsey	Team
Gold medal – first place	1996 Petaling Jaya	Team
Gold medal – first place	1998 Stuttgart	Team
Silver medal – second place	2000 Sheffield	Team
Gold medal – first place	2002 Odense	Team
Gold medal – first place	2004 Amsterdam	Team
Gold medal – first place	2010 Palmerston	Team
World Doubles Championships
Silver medal – second place	2006 Melbourne	Doubles
World Games
Gold medal – first place	1997 Lahti	Singles
Commonwealth Games
Gold medal – first place	2002 Manchester	Singles
Silver medal – second place	1998 Kuala Lumpur	Singles
Bronze medal – third place	1998 Kuala Lumpur	Doubles
- Updated on 12 April 2022

Sarah Elizabeth Fitz-Gerald AM (born 1 December 1968) is an Australian former professional squash player who won five World Open titles – 1996, 1997, 1998, 2001 and 2002. She ranks alongside Janet Morgan, Nicol David, Susan Devoy, Michelle Martin and Heather McKay as the sport's greatest female players of all time.

== Career ==
Fitz-Gerald was born in Melbourne, Australia, a hotspot for squash talent. In 1987, she won the female World Junior Championship and was the Australian Junior Female Athlete of the Year. It was also during this year that she represented Australia at the 1987 Women's World Team Squash Championships, finishing runner-up to England. In 1992 she was selected once again to represent Australia in the 1992 Women's World Team Squash Championships and this time Australia became the world champions. Remarkably, Fitzgerald would go on to win a total of seven World Team Championships.

She won numerous titles in the early 1990s, but 1996 proved to be her breakthrough year. She beat England's Cassie Jackman in the World Open final. The next two years she beat the resurgent Michelle Martin in successive finals.

The next two years did not bring the same level of success, owing largely to knee surgery. In 2000, she lost an epic semi-final against Carol Owens. However, she came back in 2001 to beat New Zealand's Leilani Joyce emphatically 9–0, 9–3, 9–2.

2002 saw her win her last World Open, beating Natalie Pohrer 10–8, 9–3, 7–9, 9–7. She also won a gold medal at the 2002 Commonwealth Games in Manchester, England.

In January 2004, Fitz-Gerald was awarded the Member of the Order of Australia (AM) for her achievements and services to women's squash, and the promotion of sport and a healthy lifestyle. She was Chairwoman and President of the Women's International Squash Players Association from 1991 to 2002. In 2010, she was inducted into the Sport Australia Hall of Fame.

Fitz-Gerald announced her retirement from the Women's International Squash Players Association (WISPA) world tour in February 2003.

In 2010, she came out of retirement to be part of the Australian team that won the gold medal at the 2010 Women's World Team Squash Championships.

In 2018, she won her fourth World Masters title.

== Career statistics ==
=== Professional Tour Titles (60) ===
All results for Sarah Fitzgerald in WISPA World's Tour tournament

Legend WISPA Platinum Series (2) WISPA Gold Series (9) WISPA Silver Series (14) WISPA Tour Series (35)	Titles by Major Tournaments World Open (5) British Open (2) Hong Kong Open (0) Qatar Classic (1)

No.	Date	Tournament	Opponent in Final	Score in Final
1.	13 June 1989	Adelaide Open	(Australia) Sharon Bradey	Unknown
2.	24 November 1991	Danish Open	(England) Lisa Opie	(3–0)
3.	28 June 1992	Japan Open	(England) Lisa Opie	(3–0)
4.	26 July 1992	ACT Open	(Australia) Robyn Lambourne	(3–0)
5.	25 July 1993	ACT Open	(Australia) Carol Owens	15–8, 9–15, 15–13, 15–7
6.	10 July 1994	Adelaide Open	(Australia) Vicki Cardwell	15–13, 15–9, 15–8
7.	18 June 1995	South Australia Open	(Australia) Vicki Cardwell	(3–0)
8.	22 July 1995	Victorian Open	(Australia) Meeghan Bell	(3–0)
9.	22 July 1995	Queensland Open	(Australia) Liz Irving	(3–0)
10.	10 September 1995	JSM Supersquash	(Australia) Michelle Martin	9–6, 8–10, 2–9, 9–6, 9–4
11.	16 September 1995	Jain International	(Australia) Michelle Martin	(3–0)
12.	17 March 1996	Abshot Open	(England) Suzanne Horner	(3–0)
13.	28 July 1996	Victorian Open	(Australia) Carol Owens	(3–0)
14.	17 August 1996	Singapore Open	(Australia) Michelle Martin	Walkover
15.	13 October 1996	World Open	(England) Cassie Jackman	9–4, 9–2, 4–9, 9–6
16.	10 November 1996	German Masters	(Australia) Michelle Martin	9–6, 3–9, 9–4, 9–3
17.	23 November 1996	Monte Carlo Classic	(England) Cassie Jackman	9–4, 9–2, 4–9, 9–6
18.	11 May 1997	Las Vegas Open	(Australia) Liz Irving	9–3, 9–1, 9–4
19.	17 June 1997	Al-Ahram International	(Australia) Michelle Martin	9–3, 9–3, 9–0
20.	22 June 1997	Munich Open	(Australia) Michelle Martin	9–7, 9–7, 9–2
21.	17 August 1997	World Games	(Germany) Sabine Schoene	9–2, 9–6, 9–7
22.	24 August 1997	Singapore Open	(Australia) Michelle Martin	9–1, 5–9, 9–1, 9–7
23.	30 August 1997	Malaysian Open	(Australia) Michelle Martin	9–2, 0–9, 9–2, 8–10, 9–7
24.	19 October 1997	World Open (2)	(Australia) Michelle Martin	9–5, 5–9, 6–9, 9–2, 9–3
25.	26 October 1997	Australian Open	(Australia) Michelle Martin	5–9, 9–4, 9–4, 9–0
26.	3 November 1997	Carol Weymuller Open	(Australia) Michelle Martin	9–3, 7–9, 9–0, 3–9, 10–8
27.	17 November 1997	Hartford Open	(England) Cassie Jackman	9–4, 9–7, 9–3
28.	29 November 1997	Monte Carlo Classic	(England) Sue Wright	9–1, 4–9, 9–1, 9–4
29.	20 April 1998	Munich Open	(England) Michelle Martin	9–2, 9–0, 10–8
30.	10 May 1998	Las Vegas Open	(England) Stephanie Brind	9–0, 9–3, 9–3
31.	9 August 1998	Victorian Open	(Australia) Carol Owens	(3–1)
32.	8 November 1998	World Open (3)	(Australia) Michelle Martin	10–8, 9–7, 2–9, 3–9, 10–9
33.	16 January 2000	Glidden Open	(England) Suzanne Horner	9–1, 9–0, 9–7
34.	23 January 2000	Greenwich Open	(England) Suzanne Horner	9–6, 9–0, 4–9, 9–7
35.	5 February 2000	Rosebowl Classic	(England) Sue Wright	9–3, 5–9, 9–4, 10–8
36.	16 April 2000	Munich Open	(Australia) Carol Owens	9–7, 9–5, 9–0
37.	30 April 2000	Mexican Open	(Australia) Rachael Grinham	9–7, 9–6, 9–2
38.	24 September 2000	Singapore Open	(South Africa) Claire Nitch	9–1, 9–1, 9–4
39.	8 December 2000	USC Classic	(Australia) Carol Owens	3–9, 9–3, 9–6, 9–1
40.	28 January 2001	Greenwich Open	(England) Linda Charman-Smith	9–5, 9–2, 9–4
41.	11 March 2001	Munich Open	(New Zealand) Leilani Joyce	9–1, 9–2, 9–6
42.	19 April 2001	World Grand Prix Finals	(New Zealand) Leilani Joyce	9–6, 9–5, 9–1
43.	12 May 2001	San Francisco Challenge	(England) Cassie Campion	7–9, 9–4, 9–5, 9–2
44.	20 May 2001	Seattle Open	(Australia) Carol Owens	9–6, 9–7, 9–2
45.	10 June 2001	British Open	(Australia) Carol Owens	10–9, 9–0, 9–2
46.	4 September 2001	Heliopolis Open	(England) Cassie Campion	9–3, 9–1, 9–1
47.	8 October 2001	Qatar Classic	(New Zealand) Leilani Joyce	9–0, 9–2, 9–1
48.	19 October 2001	World Open (4)	(New Zealand) Leilani Joyce	9–0, 9–3, 9–2
49.	20 January 2002	Hartford Open	(New Zealand) Carol Owens	2–9, 9–4, 9–7, 9–1
50.	1 February 2002	Tournament of Champions	(New Zealand) Carol Owens	9–4, 9–0, 9–3
51.	15 April 2002	British Open (2)	(England) Tania Bailey	9–3, 9–0, 9–0
52.	28 April 2002	World Grand Prix Finals	(New Zealand) Carol Owens	6–9, 5–9, 9–5, 9–7, 9–4
53.	12 May 2002	San Francisco Challenge	(England) Tania Bailey	9–1, 7–9, 9–1, 9–2
54.	19 May 2002	Las Vegas Open	(Netherlands) Vanessa Atkinson	9–4, 9–2, 9–0
55.	26 May 2002	Seattle Open	(New Zealand) Carol Owens	9–7, 9–7, 9–1
56.	30 June 2002	Australian Open	(Australia) Laura Keating	9–0, 9–2, 9–0
57.	14 September 2002	French Open	(England) Linda Elriani	10–8, 5–9, 9–4, 10–8
58.	2 November 2002	World Open (5)	(United States) Natalie Grainger	10–8, 9–3, 7–9, 9–7
59.	22 August 2004	Victorian Open	(New Zealand) Louise Crome	9–1, 9–4, 9–5
60.	13 May 2007	Top End Open	(Australia) Peta Hughes	9–1, 9–3, 9–0

== See also ==
- List of WISPA number 1 ranked players
- Official Women's Squash World Ranking

Sporting positions
Preceded by Michelle Martin; Leilani Rorani; Natalie Grainger	World No. 1 November 1996 – October 1998; October 2001 – October 2002; December 2002 – February 2003	Succeeded by Michelle Martin; Carol Owens; Carol Owens
