= Squash at the 1997 World Games – Women's singles =

1997 World Games - Squash Single Women
Host	(Finland) Lahti
Dates	August 16–17, 1997
Teams	4
Podium
Champion	(Australia) Sarah Fitz-Gerald
Runners-up	(Germany) Sabine Schöne
Third place	(New Zealand) Leilani Joyce
Fourth place	(United Kingdom) Sue Wright

The Squash - Single Women competition at the World Games 1997 take place from 16 August to 17 August 1997 in Lahti in Finland.

== Draw ==
Semi finals
1	(Australia) Sarah Fitz-Gerald	3
3	(New Zealand) Leilani Joyce	0
4	(United Kingdom) Sue Wright	2
2	(Germany) Sabine Schöne	3

Finals
1	(Australia) Sarah Fitz-Gerald	3
2	(Germany) Sabine Schöne	0
3rd place
3	(New Zealand) Leilani Joyce	3
4	(United Kingdom) Sue Wright	0

Note: * w/d = Withdraw, * w/o = Walkover, * r = Retired
