= Engy Kheirallah =

Egyptian squash player (born 1981)

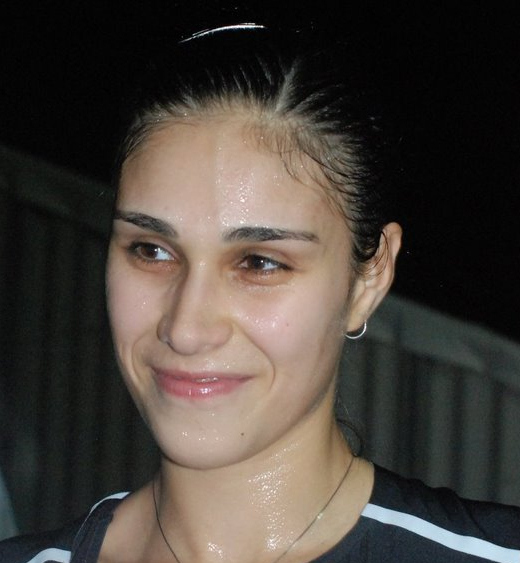
- Engy Kheirallah during 2009 Women's Soho Square Championship

Personal information
- Born: 5 December 1981 (age 44) Alexandria, Egypt

Sport
- Country: Egypt
- Handedness: Right
- Turned pro: 1999
- Coached by: Ahmed Taher
- Racquet used: Head

Women's singles
- Highest ranking: 11 (July 2010)
Medal record
Women's squash
Representing Egypt
World Team Championships
Gold medal – first place	2008 Cairo	Team
Silver medal – second place	2006 Edmonton	Team
- Updated on December 2016

Engy Kheirallah is a professional squash player from Egypt. She was born on 5 December 1981. She was ranked 33 in May 2011 and reached a career high ranking of World no. 11 in July 2010. Engy came to the fore in 1999 when she, Omneya Abdel Kawy and Eman El Amir captured the World Junior Team title, herself having been a semi finalist in the Individual event.

By 2002 she had broken into the World Top 30, but it was not until 2005 when she began to move forward more steadily than occasional match wins. Engy, who is from Alexandria, won three events that year, including an emotional Alexandria Open when she beat Abdel Kawy in the semis.

The surge continued in 2006 with another win over Abdel Kawy in the Apawamis Open and reaching the final of the Texas Open by continuing her hold over Abdel Kawy and beating Natalie Grainger, together with a semi final berth in the Hurghada International. These results propelled her into the Top 20.

A noted encounter was between Engy and Nour El Sherbini, the 13 year old Egyptian who then made history by becoming the youngest player ever to reach the final of a WISPA World Tour squash event, in June 2009 at Cairo. Kheirallah was then ranked 22 in the world and was the top seed of the ATCO Miro Classic No1 tournament at Cairo. The final score was a dramatic encounter of 11–8, 11–9, 7–11, 7–11, 11-7 which lasted well over one hour.

The rivalry between Engy and Abdel Kawy continued in the following years when they faced off in the first all-Egyptian final of Women's Hurghada International in 2010. Before this final, Abdel Kawy had lost to Kheirallah in all their previous five Tour meetings since 2005, despite being ranked ahead of Engy throughout Kawy's career. In that final, Kawy managed to bolster a dominating win of 11–4, 11–8, 14–12 over Engy.

She is known to have used a Head racquet for most of her career.

Engy is now married to Egyptian squash player Karim Darwish and they have a son, named Omar.

== See also ==
- Official Women's Squash World Ranking
