= Philippa Beams =

New Zealand squash player

Sport
- Country: New Zealand
- Turned pro: 1992
- Highest ranking: 14 (January 1998)
Medal record
Women's squash
Representing New Zealand
World Team Championships
| Silver medal – second place | 1992 Vancouver | Team |
| Bronze medal – third place | 1998 Stuttgart | Team |
World Doubles Championships
| Gold medal – first place | 1997 Hong Kong | Doubles |

Philippa Beams is a New Zealand former professional squash player who was also a former national champion and world doubles champion in the women's category. She represented New Zealand national women's squash team in several international competitions including the British Open Squash Championships, World Open Squash Championships and in World Team Squash Championships in a career spanning from 1992 to 1998. She achieved her highest career PSA ranking of 14 in January 1998 as a part of the 1998 PSA World Tour.

== Career ==
She joined the Professional Squash Association in 1992 and competed at the PSA World Tour until 1998. She made her debut with New Zealand team at the 1990 Women's World Open Squash Championship and since then she became a prominent member of the national side. Beams also took part in World Open Squash Championships in 1992, 1994, 1995, 1996, 1997 and in 1998.

She won the women's singles titles at the 1993 and 1994 National Championships beating fellow counterpart and former world number one player Leilani Joyce in both occasions. She also became the number one ranked player in national level after her victories. She was also part of the memorable and historic moment where New Zealand stunned England by 2–1 in the semi-finals of the 1992 Women's World Team Squash Championships. However New Zealand lost to rivals Australia in the finals. Beams won the inaugural edition of the World Squash Doubles Championships in the women's doubles category along with Leilani Rorani in 1997. She also represented New Zealand at the 1998 Commonwealth Games, her maiden and only appearance at the Commonwealth Games. She retired from the sport in 1998.
