= Vicky Hynes =

English squash player (born 1981)

Personal information
- Born: 30 March 1981 (age 45) Ipswich, England

Sport
- Country: England
- Turned pro: 1998
- Retired: Yes

Women's singles
- Highest ranking: No. 32 (March 2003)
- Title: 1
- Tour final: 2
- Updated on May 2018

Vicky Hynes (born 30 March 1981), also known as Victoria Lankester, is an English former professional squash player who represented England.

Hynes was born in Ipswich. She reached a career-high world ranking of 32 in March 2003.
