= Squash at the Commonwealth Games =

- Squash
- Frequency: Every four years
- Inaugurated: 1998 (Malaysia) Kuala Lumpur
- Most recent: 2022 (England) Birmingham

Squash is one of the sports at the quadrennial Commonwealth Games competition. It has been held at every Games since 1998, but will not be included in the 2026 Commonwealth Games because of financial restrictions in that stripped-back edition.

== Editions ==
Games	Year	Host city	Host country	Best nation
XVI	1998	Kuala Lumpur	Malaysia	Australia
XVII	2002	Manchester	England	New Zealand
XVIII	2006	Melbourne, Victoria	Australia	Australia
XIX	2010	Delhi	India	England
XX	2014	Glasgow	Scotland	Australia
XXI	2018	Gold Coast, Queensland	Australia	New Zealand
XXII	2022	Birmingham	England	New Zealand

== Past winners ==
=== Individual competition ===
Year	Men's singles	Women's singles	Men's doubles	Women's doubles	Mixed doubles
1998	(Scotland) Peter Nicol	(Australia) Michelle Martin	(England) Mark Chaloner (England) Paul Johnson	(England) Cassie Jackman (England) Sue Wright	(Australia) Michelle Martin (Australia) Craig Rowland
2002	(Canada) Jonathon Power	(Australia) Sarah Fitz-Gerald	(England) Peter Nicol (England) Lee Beachill	(New Zealand) Leilani Rorani (New Zealand) Carol Owens	(New Zealand) Leilani Rorani (New Zealand) Glen Wilson
2006	(England) Peter Nicol	(Australia) Natalie Grinham	(England) Peter Nicol (England) Lee Beachill	(Australia) Natalie Grinham (Australia) Rachael Grinham	(Australia) Natalie Grinham (Australia) Joe Kneipp
2010	(England) Nick Matthew	(Malaysia) Nicol David	(England) Nick Matthew (England) Adrian Grant	(New Zealand) Jaclyn Hawkes (New Zealand) Joelle King	(Australia) Kasey Brown (Australia) Cameron Pilley
2014	(England) Nick Matthew	(Malaysia) Nicol David	(Australia) Cameron Pilley (Australia) David Palmer	(India) Dipika Pallikal (India) Joshna Chinappa	(Australia) Rachael Grinham (Australia) David Palmer
2018	(England) James Willstrop	(New Zealand) Joelle King	(Australia) Zac Alexander (Australia) David Palmer	(New Zealand) Joelle King (New Zealand) Amanda Landers-Murphy	(Australia) Donna Urquhart (Australia) Cameron Pilley
2022	(New Zealand) Paul Coll	(England) Georgina Kennedy	(England) James Willstrop (England) Declan James	(New Zealand) Joelle King (New Zealand) Amanda Landers-Murphy	(New Zealand) Joelle King (New Zealand) Paul Coll

== All-time medal table ==
Updated after the 2022 Commonwealth Games

Rank	Nation	Gold	Silver	Bronze	Total
1	England	11	17	16	44
2	Australia	11	8	14	33
3	New Zealand	8	4	4	16
4	Malaysia	2	1	3	6
5	India	1	2	2	5
6	Canada	1	2	0	3
7	Scotland	1	0	2	3
8	Wales	0	1	2	3
9	South Africa	0	0	2	2
Totals (9 entries)		35	35	45	115
