= Carol Owens (squash player) =

New Zealand squash player

Personal information
- Born: 4 June 1971 (age 55) Melbourne, Australia

Sport
- Country: Australia, New Zealand
- Retired: 2004

Women's singles
- Highest ranking: No. 1 (November 2002)
Medal record
Women's squash
Representing Australia
World Championships
Gold medal – first place	2000 Edinburgh	Singles
Bronze medal – third place	1997 Sydney	Singles
World Team Championships
Gold medal – first place	1994 Saint Peter Port	Team
Gold medal – first place	1996 Petaling Jaya	Team
Gold medal – first place	1998 Stuttgart	Team
Commonwealth Games
Bronze medal – third place	1998 Kuala Lumpur	Doubles
Representing New Zealand
World Championships
Gold medal – first place	2003 Hong Kong	Singles
Bronze medal – third place	2001 Melbourne	Singles
Bronze medal – third place	2002 Doha	Singles
Commonwealth Games
Gold medal – first place	2002 Manchester	Doubles
Silver medal – second place	2002 Manchester	Singles
- Updated on 3 March 2010

Carol Owens (born 4 June 1971) is a former New Zealand-based squash player who won the World Open in 2000 and 2003.

Owens was born in Melbourne, Australia, and would eventually change her nationality when she moved to Auckland, New Zealand. A right-hander, she made her competitive debut in 1990 in the Swiss Open where she finished 17th. Her first final was the 1993 Japan Open where she was a runner-up to the Canadian Heather Wallace. She did not have to wait long for her first major victory, which came in October in Adelaide, South Australia.

She was part of the Australian winning team at the 1994 Women's World Team Squash Championships, 1996 Women's World Team Squash Championships and 1998 Women's World Team Squash Championships.

She has represented both Australia and New Zealand at the highest level and is the first female player to win medals for two countries at the Commonwealth Games.

Owens began to challenge for the world championship whilst still representing Australia and her first World Open title came in 2000 when she came back from two games down to beat New Zealander Leilani Joyce 7–9, 3–9, 10–8, 9–6, 9–1. This was after an equally epic semi-final against Sarah Fitz-Gerald.
In 2001, Owens changed her nationality, becoming a New Zealander and at the 2002 Commonwealth Games she won the gold in the doubles and a silver in the singles. The elusive second world title came in 2003, when she beat Cassie Campion 3–9, 9–2, 9–7, 9–3. It was in 2003 that she became – for the first time – the World No. 1 ranked player.

At the beginning of 2004, Owens announced that she had retired from the professional game.

== World Open ==
=== Finals: 2 (2 title, 0 runners-up) ===
Outcome	Year	Location	Opponent in the final	Score in the final
Winner	2000 Women's World Open Squash Championship	Edinburgh, Scotland	(New Zealand) Leilani Joyce	9–6, 9–5, 7–9, 5–9, 9–6
Winner	2003 Women's World Open Squash Championship	Hong Kong	(England) Cassie Jackman	3–9, 9–2, 9–7, 9–3

== World Team Championships ==
=== Finals: 3 (3 title, 0 runner-up) ===
Outcome	Year	Location	Opponent in the final	Score in the final
Winner	1994 Women's World Team Squash Championships	Saint Peter Port, Guernsey	England	3–0
Winner	1996 Women's World Team Squash Championships	Petaling Jaya, Malaysia	England	2–1
Winner	1998 Women's World Team Squash Championships	Stuttgart, Germany	England	3–0

== See also ==
- List of WISPA number 1 ranked players
- Official Women's Squash World Ranking

Sporting positions
Preceded by Sarah Fitz-Gerald; Sarah Fitz-Gerald; Natalie Grainger	World No. 1 November 2002; March 2003 – May 2003; July 2003 – January 2004	Succeeded by Sarah Fitz-Gerald; Natalie Grainger; Cassie Jackman
