= Natalie Grainger =

South African squash player (born 1977)

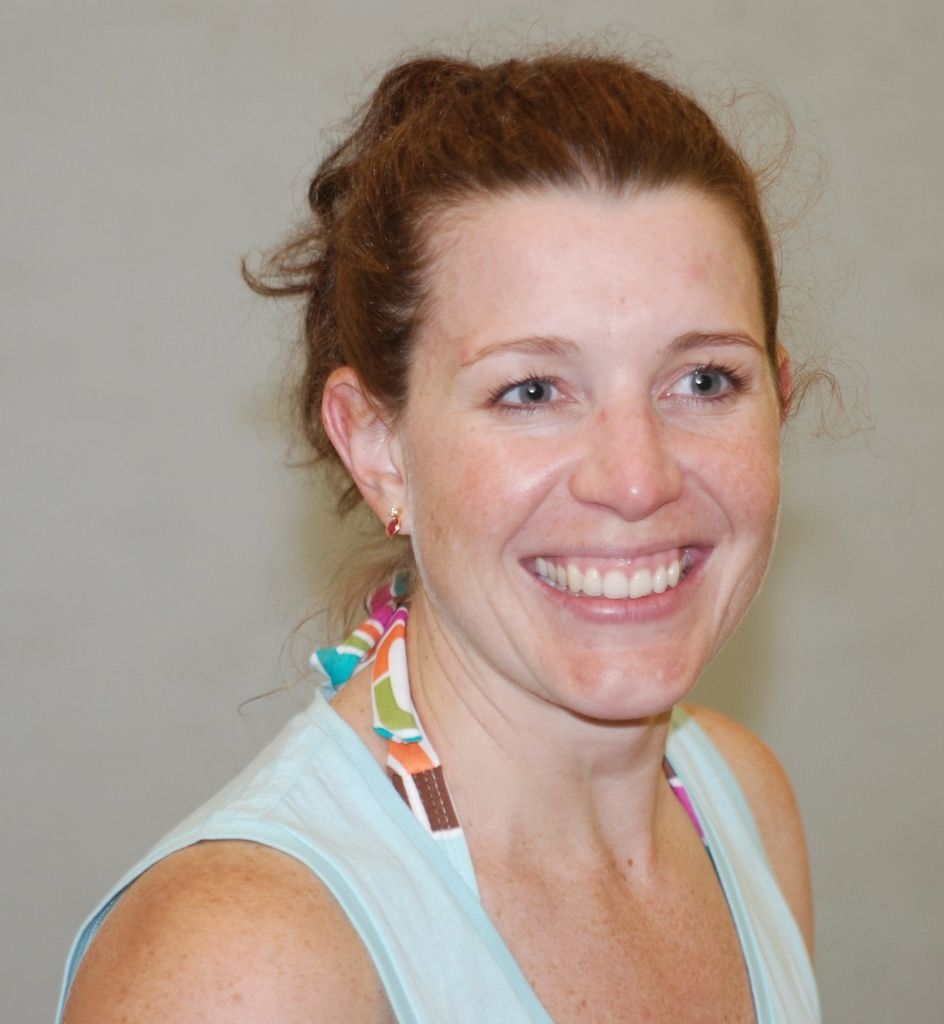
- Grainger in 2009

Personal information
- Born: July 8, 1977 (age 49) Manchester, England

Sport
- Country: United States
- Handedness: Right Handed
- Turned pro: 1996
- Coached by: Peter Briggs
- Retired: December 2010
- Racquet used: Harrow

Women's singles
- Highest ranking: No. 1 (June 2003)
Medal record
Women's squash
Representing South Africa
Commonwealth Games
Bronze medal – third place	1998 Kuala Lumpur	Doubles
Bronze medal – third place	1998 Kuala Lumpur	Mixed doubles
Representing England
World Championships
Silver medal – second place	2002 Doha	Singles
Bronze medal – third place	1999 Seattle	Singles
Bronze medal – third place	2000 Edinburgh	Singles
Representing the United States
World Championships
Bronze medal – third place	2006 Belfast	Singles
Bronze medal – third place	2007 Madrid	Singles
Pan American Games
Gold medal – first place	2007 Rio de Janeiro	Singles
Gold medal – first place	2015 Toronto	Doubles
Gold medal – first place	2015 Toronto	Team
Silver medal – second place	2007 Rio de Janeiro	Team
- Updated on January 6, 2010

Natalie Grainger (born 8 July 1977), also known for a period by her former married name Natalie Pohrer, is a former professional female squash player.

Grainger was born in Manchester, United Kingdom but raised in South Africa, which she represented in the 1998 Commonwealth Games, winning 2 bronze medals. She reached the World No. 1 ranking in June 2003. She was runner-up at the World Open in 2002, and at the British Open in 2004. She has represented South Africa, England and her adopted home country the United States (where she moved to when she married her now ex-husband Eddie Pohrer) in international squash. Her 14-year squash career came to an end when the then United States number one Grainger announced she was retiring in December 2010.

In 2018, she won her third World Masters title.

She served as President of WISPA for many years.

Her mother was British squash champion Jean Grainger.

== World Open ==
=== Finals: 1 (0 title, 1 runner-up) ===
Outcome	Year	Location	Opponent in the final	Score in the final
Runner-up	2002	Doha, Qatar	(Australia) Sarah Fitz-Gerald	10–8, 9–3, 7–9, 9–7

== Major World Series final appearances ==
=== British Open: 1 finals (0 title, 1 runner-up) ===
Outcome	Year	Opponent in the final	Score in the final
Runner-up	2004	(Australia) Rachael Grinham	6–9, 9–5, 9–0, 9–3

=== Hong Kong Open: 1 final (0 title, 1 runner-up) ===
Outcome	Year	Opponent in the final	Score in the final
Runner-up	2010	(Australia) Rachael Grinham	9–3, 9–5, 9–7

=== Qatar Classic: 1 final (0 title, 1 runner-up) ===
Outcome	Year	Opponent in the final	Score in the final
Runner-up	2007	(Malaysia) Nicol David	9–6, 9–4, 10–9

== See also ==
- List of WISPA number 1 ranked players
- Official Women's Squash World Ranking

Sporting positions
Preceded by Carol Owens	World No. 1 June 2003	Succeeded by Carol Owens
