= Fiona Geaves =

English squash player

Personal information
- Nationality: British (English)
- Born: 6 December 1967 (age 58) Gloucester, England

Sport
- Highest ranking: No. 5 (September 2001)
Medal record
Women's squash
Representing England
World Championships
Bronze medal – third place	1994 Saint Peter Port	Singles
Bronze medal – third place	1995 Hong Kong	Singles
World Team Championships
Silver medal – second place	1996 Petaling Jaya	Team
Silver medal – second place	2002 Odense	Team
Silver medal – second place	2004 Amsterdam	Team
Commonwealth Games
Bronze medal – third place	2002 Manchester	Doubles
Bronze medal – third place	2002 Manchester	Mixed doubles
European Team Championships
Gold medal – first place	1992 Aix-en-Provence	Team
Gold medal – first place	1994 Zoetermeer	Team
Gold medal – first place	1995 Amsterdam	Team
Gold medal – first place	1996 Amsterdam	Team
Gold medal – first place	1997 Odense	Team
Gold medal – first place	2001 Eindhoven	Team
Gold medal – first place	2002 Böblingen	Team

Fiona Geaves (born 6 December 1967) is a former professional squash player from England. She played on the professional tour from 1987 to 2006, winning six tour titles, reaching a career-high ranking of World No. 5 in 2001, and remaining in the world's top-20 for an unbroken stretch of 19 years.

== Biography ==
Geaves won the British National Squash Championship title in 1995 but her best achievements were finishing third and winning the bronze medal at the World Championships in both 1994 and 1995.

Geaves won seven gold medals for the England women's national squash team at the European Squash Team Championships from 1992 to 2002.

Geaves represented the 2002 England team at the 2002 Commonwealth Games in Manchester, England. She competed in the women's doubles and mixed doubles and won two bronze medals, partnering Linda Charman and Chris Walker respectively.

Now Fiona works at the Heights Casino in Brooklyn, New York. She is the head coach and has started a doubles career with fellow coach Meredith Quick.

== World Team Championships ==
=== Finals: 3 (0 title, 3 runner-up) ===
Outcome	Year	Location	Opponent in the final	Score in the final
Runner-up	1996 Women's World Team Squash Championships	Petaling Jaya, Malaysia	Australia	2-1
Runner-up	2002 Women's World Team Squash Championships	Odense, Denmark	Australia	2-1
Runner-up	2004 Women's World Team Squash Championships	Amsterdam, Netherlands	Australia	2-0

== See also ==
- Official Women's Squash World Ranking
