= Rebecca Macree =

English squash player

Personal information
- Nationality: British (English)
- Born: 19 June 1971 (age 55) Barking, London, England

Sport

Women's singles
- Highest ranking: No. 7 (May 2003)
Medal record
Women's squash
Representing England
World Team Championships
Gold medal – first place	2000 Sheffield	Team
European Team Championships
Gold medal – first place	2003 Nottingham	Team

Rebecca Claire Macree (born 19 June 1971) is an English former professional squash player. She reached a career high ranking of 7 in the world during May 2003.

== Biography ==
Macree was born deaf, in Barking, London, England. Macree began playing squash at the age of 14 and espite her relatively late start in the sport, she took to the game immediately and quickly began winning junior tournaments. She turned professional in 1993 and despite her disability was able to win 8 titles from 24 final appearances during a 17-year career on the WISPA tour from 1993 to 2005. She represented England in the World Team Squash Championships and European Team Championships. Her greatest achievement was being part of the England team that won the 2000 Women's World Team Squash Championships held in Sheffield.

Her achievements place her among the world's most successful hearing-impaired athletes.

Macree won a gold medal for the England women's national squash team at the 2003 European Squash Team Championships in Nottingham.

Throughout her career, Macree was known for being a very combative and forthright player, prone to occasional fits of temper on the court. In 2002, she received a 42-day ban from the Women's International Squash Players Association following a heated exchange with a referee at the Singapore Open which ended with Macree calling the official a "Tosser".

== See also ==
- Official Women's Squash World Ranking
