= Stephanie Brind =

English squash player (born 1977)

Personal information
- Nationality: British (English)
- Born: 8 June 1977 (age 49) Bexleyheath, London, England

Sport
- Handedness: Right Handed
- Turned pro: 1995
- Racquet used: Head

Women's singles
- Highest ranking: No. 4 (November 2001)
Medal record
Women's squash
Representing England
World Team Championships
Gold medal – first place	2000 Sheffield	Team
Silver medal – second place	2002 Odense	Team
European Team Championships
Gold medal – first place	1999 Linz	Team
Gold medal – first place	2000 Vienna	Team
Gold medal – first place	2002 Böblingen	Team

Stephanie Brind (born 8 June 1977) is an English professional squash player. She is a right-handed squash player and her former coach is Paul Carter. She reached a career-high world ranking of World No. 4 in November 2001.

== Biography ==
Brind attended Bexley Grammar School from 1988 to 1995.

Her greatest achievement was being part of the England team that won the 2000 Women's World Team Squash Championships held in Sheffield.

Brind represented the 2002 England team at the 2002 Commonwealth Games in Manchester, England, where she competed in the singles and mixed doubles, partnering Paul Johnson in the latter.

Brind won three gold medals for the England women's national squash team at the European Squash Team Championships in 1999, 2000 and 2002.

== See also ==
- Official Women's Squash World Ranking
