= Suzanne Horner =

English squash player

Suzanne Horner (née Burgess)
Personal information
- Nationality: British (English)
- Born: 23 February 1963 (age 63) Wakefield, West Yorkshire, England

Sport
- Highest ranking: No. 2 (September 1994)
Medal record
Women's squash
Representing England
World Championships
Bronze medal – third place	1994 Saint Peter Port	Singles
Bronze medal – third place	1998 Stuttgart	Singles
World Team Championships
Gold medal – first place	1989 Warmond	Team
Gold medal – first place	1990 Sydney	Team
Silver medal – second place	1994 Saint Peter Port	Team
Silver medal – second place	1996 Petaling Jaya	Team
Silver medal – second place	1998 Stuttgart	Team
Commonwealth Games
Silver medal – second place	1998 Kuala Lumpur	Mixed doubles
European Team Championships
Gold medal – first place	1987 Vienna	Team
Gold medal – first place	1989 Helsinki	Team
Gold medal – first place	1993 Aix-en-Provence	Team
Gold medal – first place	1994 Zoetermeer	Team
Gold medal – first place	1996 Amsterdam	Team
Gold medal – first place	1999 Linz	Team

Suzanne Horner (née Burgess, born 23 February 1963) is an English former professional squash player.

== Biography ==
Horner was runner-up at the British Open in 1990 and 1993. In 1994, she captured the US Open title and reached a career-high ranking of World No. 2. She won the British National Squash Championships in 1994 and 1996. She was a silver Commonwealth medallist for the 1998 England team at the 1998 Commonwealth Games in Kuala Lumpur, Malaysia, when she competed with Simon Parke in the mixed doubles competition.

Her greatest successes were being part of the successful England team that won the 1989 Women's World Team Squash Championships in Warmond, Netherlands and the 1990 Women's World Team Squash Championships in Sydney, Australia.

Horner won six gold medals for the England women's national squash team at the European Squash Team Championships, one in 1987 under her maiden name of Burgess, and five more in 1989, 1993, 1994, 1996 and 1999.

She won the World Over-35 Championship in 1999.

== World Team Championships ==
=== Finals: 5 (2 title, 3 runner-up) ===
Outcome	Year	Location	Opponent in the final	Score in the final
Winner	1989 Women's World Team Squash Championships	Warmond, Netherlands	Australia	3-0
Winner	1990 Women's World Team Squash Championships	Sydney, Australia	Australia	2-1
Runner-up	1994 Women's World Team Squash Championships	Saint Peter Port, Guernsey	Australia	3-0
Runner-up	1996 Women's World Team Squash Championships	Petaling Jaya, Malaysia	Australia	2-1
Runner-up	1998 Women's World Team Squash Championships	Stuttgart, Germany	Australia	3-0

== See also ==
- Official Women's Squash World Ranking
