= Claire Nitch =

South African squash player

Medal record

Women's squash

Representing South Africa

Commonwealth Games
Bronze medal – third place	1998 Kuala Lumpur	Doubles

Claire Nitch (born 7 August 1971 in Johannesburg, South Africa) is a South African squash player.

Nitch reached a career-high world ranking of World No. 9 in 1997. At the 1998 Commonwealth Games, she won a bronze medal in the women's doubles (partnering Natalie Grainger).

Nitch has won the South African national squash title nine times. As a junior, she also won the national under-19 and under-21 titles.
