= Leilani Rorani =

New Zealand squash player

Leilani Rorani MNZM
Personal information
- Born: 15 April 1974 (age 52) Hamilton, New Zealand

Sport
- Handedness: Right-Handed
- Coached by: Rob Wyatt
- Retired: September 2002
- Racquet used: Unsquashable

Women's Singles
- Highest ranking: 1 (November 2000)
- Title: 13
- Tour final: 25
- World Open: RU (2000, 2001)
Medal record
Women's squash
Representing New Zealand
World Championships
Silver medal – second place	2000 Edinburgh	Singles
Silver medal – second place	2001 Melbourne	Singles
Bronze medal – third place	1999 Seattle	Singles
World Games
Bronze medal – third place	1997 Lahti	Singles
World Team Championships
Bronze medal – third place	1998 Stuttgart	Team
Bronze medal – third place	2000 Sheffield	Team
World Doubles Championships
Gold medal – first place	1997 Hong Kong	Doubles
Commonwealth Games
Gold medal – first place	2002 Manchester	Doubles
Gold medal – first place	2002 Manchester	Mixed doubles

Leilani Rorani MNZM (formerly Joyce, née Marsh; born 15 April 1974) is a New Zealand former squash player. During her professional career, she reached the world number 1 ranking, won the British Open in 1999 and 2000, and finished runner-up at the World Open in 2000 and 2001.

== Early life and family ==
Born Leilani Marsh in Hamilton on 15 April 1974, Rorani is the daughter of Neal and Maise Marsh (née Reihana). Of Māori descent, she affiliates to Ngāti Hine, Ngāi Te Rangi, and the Tainui confederation. She was educated at Church College of New Zealand, and is a member of the Church of Jesus Christ of Latter-day Saints. She married Paul Joyce, but the couple later divorced. In 2002, she married Blair Rorani in the Hamilton New Zealand Temple. They have four children.

== Squash career ==
In the early part of her career, she was known by her maiden name, Leilani Marsh, and competed in the 1996 World Open as the number 14 seed under that name. Following her first marriage, she competed as Leilani Joyce, and then was known as Leilani Rorani in the latter stages of her career.

As a junior player, Rorani won the New Zealand under-13, under-15, under-17 and under-19 championships, the Australian under-17 and under-19 championship, and the Oceania under-19 championship.

During her 12-year career on the international tour, Rorani won 16 WISPA titles. She also won four New Zealand national titles. She was named Māori Sportsperson of the Year twice, and New Zealand Sportswoman of the Year in 2000.

Rorani retired from the professional tour in 2002, after winning gold medals in both the women's doubles and mixed doubles at the 2002 Commonwealth Games.

== Honours ==
In 1990, she was awarded the New Zealand 1990 Commemoration Medal. In the 2001 New Year Honours, Rorani was appointed a Member of the New Zealand Order of Merit, for services to squash.

== See also ==
- List of WISPA number 1 ranked players
- Official Women's Squash World Ranking

Sporting positions
Preceded by Cassie Jackman	World No. 1 November 2000 – September 2001	Succeeded by Sarah Fitz-Gerald
Awards
Preceded by Barbara Kendall	New Zealand's Sportswoman of the Year; 2000	Succeeded by Melissa Moon
