= Sabine Schöne =

German squash player (born 1974)

Personal information
- Born: 27 January 1974 (age 52) Munich, Germany

Sport
- Country: Germany
- Handedness: Right Handed
- Coached by: Kevin Karam
- Retired: 2004
- Racquet used: Slazenger

Women's singles
- Highest ranking: No. 6 (November 1997)
- Title: 5
- Tour final: 11
Medal record
Women's squash
Representing Germany
World Championships
Bronze medal – third place	1993 Johannesburg	Singles
World Games
Silver medal – second place	1997 Lahti	Singles
- Updated on July 2012

Sabine Schöne (born 27 January 1974 in Munich) is a former professional squash player who represented Germany. She reached a career-high ranking of World No. 6 in November 1997.

== Career ==
As a junior, Schöne won ten national junior titles in various age groups. In 1988, at the age of only 14, she won her first national championship title in the women's division - a title she held for 17 years until she retired in 2004. In 1991, she lost the final of the World Junior Championships against England's Cassie Campion. For eight years she was ranked in the Top Ten with five tournament wins and a silver medal at the World Games in Lahti in 1997. In 2010 and 2012, she became World Champion in the O35 category.
