= Women's International Squash Players Association =

Sporting body

- Sport: Women's Professional Squash
- Jurisdiction: International
- Abbreviation: WISPA
- Founded: 1983
- Location: London, United Kingdom
- Chairman: (Sweden) Ingrid Löfdahl-Bentzer
- Replaced: Women's Squash Association (WSA)
- Closure date: 2011

The Women's International Squash Players Association (WISPA) was the governing body for the women's professional squash circuit between 1983 and 2011. The WISPA World Tour involved over 80 tournaments annually worldwide. Over 200 players were registered with the WISPA.

The goals of the association were to:

- Enable more players to consider a career in professional squash economically viable through the development of a world tour;
- Produce and publish world rankings;
- Increase exposure for the sport and its players;
- Encourage professionalism among its members;
- Raise the administrative standards at events;
- Increase the level of support and advice offered to promoters; and
- Improve communication and relationships with other squash organizations and the press.

The new women's squash game is governed now by the Women's Squash Association (WSA).

== See also ==
- Women's Squash Association
- Professional Squash Association
