= 1982 Women's British Open Squash Championship =

Squash tournament

British Open Squash Championships
- 54th Women's British Open Championships

Details
- Location: Bromley, England
- Venue: Churchill Theatre

The 1982 Women's Audi British Open Squash Championships was held at the Churchill Theatre in Bromley from 1–7 April 1982.

The event was won for the third consecutive year by Vicki Cardwell who defeated Lisa Opie in the final. The semi-finalists were Barbara Oldfield and Angela Smith.

== Draw and results ==
=== First round ===
| Player one | Player two | Score |
|---|---|---|
| (Australia) Vicki Cardwell (née Hoffman) | (England) P Lusby | 9-1 9-0 9-1 |
| (England) Sue Cogswell | (South Africa) Marianne Van Wyk | 9-7 10-8 9-2 |
| (Guernsey) Lisa Opie | (Republic of Ireland) Rebecca Best | 9-2 9-1 9-7 |
| (England) Angela Smith | (England) Paula Anderson | 9-0 9-0 9-2 |
| (Australia) Rhonda Thorne | (England) Sharon Murrin | 9-1 9-0 9-1 |
| (Australia) Carin Clonda | (Nigeria) Tari Tikili | 9-7 10-8 9-2 |
| (New Zealand) Robyn Blackwood | (England) Lesley Moore | 9-4 9-4 9-6 |
| (Australia) Di Davis | (England) L Gillam | 9-5 9-0 9-4 |
| (England) Barbara Diggens | (England) S Coupe | 9-2 9-3 9-2 |
| (Australia) Rae Anderson | (England) Sandra Wrench | 9-5 9-3 8-10 9-4 |
| (England) Jayne Ashton | (South Africa) L Houghton | |
| (Australia) Margaret Zachariah | (England) Nicki Spurgeon | 9-1 9-2 9-2 |
| (South Africa) Mrs J Moore | (England) Jill Benfield | 9-7 9-0 9-4 |
| (England) S Kipping | (Australia) S Bland | 9-6 9-6 9-1 |
| (England) Carol Machin | (Brazil) D Paston | 9-6 9-1 9-1 |
| (South Africa) Renee Aucamp | (England) G Hill | 9-1 9-0 9-2 |
| (South Africa) L Colburn | (Republic of Ireland) Barbara Sanderson | 9-7 9-1 9-2 |
| (England) Ruth Strauss | (England) Karen Butterworth | 9-2 9-3 9-5 |
| (England) Alex Cowie | (Egypt) S Abu El Magd | 9-1 9-0 9-3 |
| (England) Claire Chapman | (Australia) Camille Ruffin | 9-2 9-3 9-1 |
| (England) Sheila White | (Singapore) T Wu | 9-7 9-3 9-0 |
| (England) Joyce Tuomey | (South Africa) Joanne Bester | 9-4 9-4 5-9 9-1 |
| (Scotland) Heather Wallace | (South Africa) Frances Candy | 9-4 9-6 9-5 |

=== Main draw ===
Second round
(Australia) Vicki Cardwell | 9 | 9 | 9
(England) Lesley Moore | 4 | 6 | 1
(Australia) Di Davis | 2 | 9 | 9 | 9
(England) Ruth Strauss | 9 | 4 | 5 | 5
(New Zealand) Robyn Blackwood | 9 | 9 | 9
(England) Claire Chapman | 0 | 1 | 0
(Australia) Rae Anderson | 9 | 9 | 9
(South Africa) L Colburn | 2 | 1 | 6
(England) Angela Smith
(England) Barbara Diggens | 9 | 9 | 8 | 9
(New Zealand) Susan Devoy | 1 | 5 | 10 | 0
(Australia) Carin Clonda | 9 | 9 | 9
(South Africa) Renee Aucamp | 7 | 2 | 5
(England) Sue Cogswell
(Guernsey) Lisa Opie | 6 | 9 | 9 | 9
(England) Alex Cowie | 9 | 3 | 0 | 7
(England) Jayne Ashton | 9 | 9 | 9
(Scotland) Heather Wallace | 1 | 4 | 0
(Guernsey) Martine Le Moignan | 9 | 9 | 9
(England) S Kipping | 4 | 3 | 2
(England) Felicity Hargreaves
(Australia) Rhonda Thorne
(England) Alison Cumings | 9 | 9 | 9
(England) Joyce Tuomey | 3 | 3 | 5
(Australia) Barbara Oldfield
(Australia) Margaret Zachariah | 9 | 9 | 9
(Northern Ireland) Irene Hewitt | 0 | 4 | 0

Third round
(Australia) Cardwell | 9 | 9 | 9
(Australia) Davis | 0 | 3 | 3
(New Zealand) Blackwood | 9 | 9 | 7 | 9
(Australia) Anderson | 7 | 5 | 9 | 2
(England) Smith | 9 | 9 | 9
(England) Diggens | 3 | 5 | 7
(Australia) Clonda | 10 | 9 | 9 | 6 | 9
(England) Cogswell | 8 | 10 | 2 | 9 | 7
(Guernsey) Opie | 7 | 7 | 9 | 9 | 9
(England) Ashton | 9 | 9 | 5 | 0 | 5
(Guernsey) Le Moignan | 9 | 5 | 10 | 2 | 9
(England) Hargreaves | 5 | 9 | 8 | 9 | 2
(Australia) Thorne | 9 | 9 | 9
(England) Cumings | 1 | 3 | 0
(Australia) Oldfield | 9 | 2 | 6 | 9 | 9
(Australia) Zachariah | 2 | 9 | 9 | 6 | 6

Quarter finals
(Australia) Cardwell | 9 | 9 | 9
(New Zealand) Blackwood | 5 | 5 | 2
(England) Smith | 7 | 9 | 9 | 9
(Australia) Clonda | 9 | 4 | 6 | 6
(Guernsey) Opie | 9 | 9 | 10
(Guernsey) Le Moignan | 4 | 0 | 8
(Australia) Thorne | 9 | 7 | 10 | 6 | 0
(Australia) Oldfield | 3 | 9 | 8 | 9 | 9

Semi-finals
(Australia) Cardwell | 9 | 10 | 9
(England) Smith | 0 | 8 | 2
Final
(Australia) Cardwell | 9 | 5 | 9 | 9
(Australia) Opie | 4 | 9 | 4 | 4
(Guernsey) Opie | 7 | 9 | 9 | 9
(Australia) Oldfield | 9 | 0 | 3 | 9

| Preceded by 1981 | British Open Squash Championships; England (Bromley); 1982 | Succeeded by 1983 |
