= 1979 Women's British Open Squash Championship =

British Open Squash Championships
- 51st Women's British Open Championships

Details
- Location: London, England
- Venue: Wembley

The 1979 Women's British Open Squash Championships was held at the Wembley Squash Centre in London from 23 February - 2 March 1979. The event was won by Barbara Wall who defeated Sue Cogswell in the final.

== Seeds ==
1. (Australia) Sue King (née Newman)
2. (Australia) Vicki Hoffman
3. (England) Sue Cogswell
4. (England) Angela Smith
5. (Australia) Rhonda Thorne (née Shapland)
6. (Australia) Lyle Hubinger
7. (Australia) Anne Smith
8. (Australia) Barbara Wall

(Australia) Margaret Zachariah (9/16)
(South Africa) Valerie Bridgens (9/16)
(Australia) S Wright (9/16)
(South Africa) Sue Paton (9/16)
(England) Teresa Lawes (9/16)
(England) Barbara Diggens (9/16)
(England) Jayne Ashton (9/16)

(New Zealand) Pam Buckingham (née Guy) (9/16)

== First round ==
| Player one | Player two | Score |
|---|---|---|
| (Australia) Sue King (née Newman) | (Republic of Ireland) Barbara Sanderson | 9-2 9-1 9-0 |
| (Australia) Vicki Hoffman | (Pakistan) Rukshana Rashid | 9-2 9-0 9-0 |
| (Australia) Lyle Hubinger | (Sweden) Katarina Due-Boje | 9-1 9-0 9-4 |
| (Australia) Barbara Wall | (England) Felicity Hargreaves | 9-7 1-9 9-1 9-1 |
| (Australia) Margaret Zachariah | (England) J Robinson | 9-1 9-0 9-2 |
| (South Africa) Sue Paton | (Canada) Shelagh Murray | 9-0 9-0 9-1 |
| (New Zealand) Pam Buckingham (née Guy) | (England) Ruth Strauss | |
| (England) Barbara Diggens | (South Africa) Di Sherren | 9-5 9-7 9-2 |
| (England) Joyce Maycock | (South Africa) Pam Haig | 4-9 9-7 9-3 9-6 |
| (Australia) Bev Johnson | (United States) Ginny Akabane | 9-1 9-4 9-4 |
| (New Zealand) Annette Owen | (England) J Griffiths | 9-6 9-2 9-5 |
| (England) Lesley Moore | (South Africa) Denise Holton | 9-5 9-2 9-4 |

== Draw and results ==
Second round
8 | (Australia) Barbara Wall | 9 | 9 | 9
(Northern Ireland) Irene Hewitt | 3 | 1 | 5
9/16 | (England) Teresa Lawes
1 | (Australia) Sue King | 9 | 9 | 9
(England) Lesley Moore | 1 | 2 | 5
(England) Ruth Strauss
(England) Alison Cumings
4 | (England) Angela Smith | 9 | 9 | 9
(Canada) Penny Glover | 2 | 0 | 4
9/16 | (South Africa) Sue Paton | 9 | 9 | 9
(England) Fran Marshall | 6 | 5 | 3
9/16 | (South Africa) Valerie Bridgens | 9 | 9 | 9
(New Zealand) Annette Owen | 1 | 5 | 1
5 | (Australia) Rhonda Thorne | 9 | 9 | 2 | 9
(England) Dianne Corbett | 3 | 6 | 9 | 0
3 | (England) Sue Cogswell | 9 | 9 | 9
(England) Jane Poynder | 2 | 1 | 0
9/16 | (Australia) S Wright | 6 | 9 | 9 | 8 | 9
(England) J Macey | 9 | 7 | 6 | 10 | 3
6 | (Australia) Lyle Hubinger | 9 | 0 | 9 | 9
(England) Theo Johnson | 6 | 9 | 5 | 6
9/16 | (England) Barbara Diggens
2 | (Australia) Vicki Hoffman | 9 | 9 | 9
(England) Sandra Wrench | 0 | 0 | 5
9/16 | (Australia) Margaret Zachariah | 9 | 9 | 9
(South Africa) Renee Aucamp | 2 | 1 | 3
7 | (Australia) Anne Smith | 9 | 9 | 9
(Canada) Sue Pexman | 1 | 1 | 7
9/16 | (England) Jayne Ashton

Third round
8 | (Australia) Wall | 9 | 9 | 6 | 10
9/16 | (England) Lawes | 1 | 6 | 9 | 8
1 | (Australia) King | 9 | 10 | 3 | 9
(England) Strauss | 1 | 8 | 9 | 7
4 | (England) Smith | 9 | 9 | 9
9/16 | (South Africa) Paton | 6 | 6 | 1
9/16 | (South Africa) Bridgens | 10 | 9 | 0 | 9
5 | (Australia) Thorne | 8 | 7 | 9 | 7
3 | (England) Cogswell | 9 | 9 | 9
9/16 | (Australia) Wright | 1 | 2 | 1
6 | (Australia) Hubinger
9/16 | (England) Diggens | 7 | 4 | 6
2 | (Australia) Hoffman | 9 | 9 | 9
9/16 | (Australia) Zachariah | 3 | 3 | 2
7 | (Australia) Smith | 9 | 5 | 9 | 9
9/16 | (England) Ashton | 5 | 9 | 4 | 5

Quarter finals
8 | (Australia) Wall
1 | (Australia) King
4 | (England) Smith
9/16 | (South Africa) Bridgens
3 | (England) Cogswell | 9 | 9 | 9
6 | (Australia) Hubinger | 1 | 5 | 4
2 | (Australia) Hoffman | 9 | 3 | 9 | 9
7 | (Australia) Smith | 7 | 9 | ? | 7

Semi-finals
8 | (Australia) Wall | 9 | 9 | 9
4 | (England) Smith | 4 | 4 | 7
Final
8 | (Australia) Wall | 8 | 6 | 9 | 9 | 9
3 | (England) Cogswell | 10 | 9 | 4 | 4 | 3
3 | (England) Cogswell | ? | ? | ?
2 | (Australia) Hoffman | ? | ? | ?

=== Third place play-off ===
(England) Angela Smith beat (Australia) Vicky Hoffman 9-1 9-7 9-10 9-1

| Preceded by 1978 | British Open Squash Championships; England (London); 1979 | Succeeded by 1980 |
