= 1979 Women's World Open Squash Championship =

Women's World Open 1979
- 2nd Women's World Squash Championship
- Location: Sheffield, England
- Date: 6–12 March 1979
- Category: World Open

Results
- Champion: (Australia) Heather McKay
- Runner-up: (England) Sue Cogswell
- Semi-finalists: (England) Angela Smith (Australia) Vicki Hoffman

The 1979 Women's World Open Squash Championship (sponsored by Pretty Polly) was the women's edition of the 1979 World Open, which serves as the individual world championship for squash players. The event took place in Sheffield in England, during 6–12 March 1979.

Heather McKay won the World Open title, defeating Sue Cogswell in the final.

== Seeds ==
1. (Australia) Heather McKay (Champion)
2. (Australia) Vicki Hoffman (Semifinals)
3. (England) Sue Cogswell (Final)
4. (England) Angela Smith (Semifinals)
5. (Australia) Barbara Wall (Quarterfinals)
6. (Australia) Sue King (Quarterfinals)
7. (Australia) Rhonda Thorne (Quarterfinals)
8. (Australia) Anne Smith (Quarterfinals)

== First round ==
Player One	Player Two	Score
(Australia) Heather McKay (1)	(England) Claire Chapman	9-1 9-0 9-1
(Australia) Vicki Hoffman (2)	(England) S. Reynolds	9-1 9-1 9-0
(England) Sue Cogswell (3)	(Canada) Shelagh Murray	9-1 9-0 9-0
(England) Angela Smith (4)	(United States) Ginny Akabane	9-1 9-0 9-0
(Australia) Barbara Wall (5)	(Northern Ireland) Irene Hewitt	9-6 5-9 9-7 9-1
(Australia) Sue King (6)	(Canada) Penny Glover	9-1 9-0 9-0
(Australia) Rhonda Thorne (7)	(England) J. Jones	9-1 9-2 9-1
(Australia) Anne Smith (8)	(Canada) Sue Pexman	9-1 9-1 9-0
(Scotland) Alix Bostock	(Pakistan) Rukshana Rashid	9-4 9-6 1-9 3-9 10-8
(Sweden) Katarina Due-Boje	(United States) Diana Nyad	9-1 10-8 9-1
(England) Ruth Strauss	(South Africa) Di Sherren	8-10 9-5 9-3 6-9 9-4
(England) Teresa Lawes	(South Africa) Pam Haig	10-9 9-2 9-2
(Canada) Elaine Hinnegan	(United States) Mariann Greenberg	10-9 9-0 9-7
(England) Joyce Maycock	(Canada) Pam Davidson	9-5 9-1 9-0
(Australia) S Wright	(England) B. Burden	9-0 9-0 9-0
(Australia) Margaret Zachariah	(Canada) Kay Widmer	9-0 9-0 9-1
(South Africa) Valerie Bridgens	(England) Nicky Ibbotson	9-0 9-1 9-7
(Australia) Lyle Hubinger	(South Africa) L. Holmes	9-2 9-0 9-5
(Australia) Carin Clonda	(England) Jane Poynder	9-7 9-6 9-5
(England) Averil Morris	(Scotland) Rae Gregg	7-9 6-9 9-2 9-2 9-0
(England) Jayne Ashton	(New Zealand) Annette Owen	w/o
(England) Felicity Hargreaves	(Scotland) Anne Smith	9-6 9-1 9-5
(Republic of Ireland) Barbara Sanderson	(England) Diane Corbett	9-1 9-5 7-9 7-9 9-7

== Draw and results ==
Second round
1	(Australia) Heather McKay	9	9	9
(England) Carol Machin	0	0	2
(England) Teresa Lawes	9	9	9
(Canada) Elaine Hinnegan	3	6	2
8	(Australia) Anne Smith	9	9	9
(United States) Carol Weymuller	0	3	5
(England) Joyce Maycock	9	9	9
(Canada) Ann Thompson	3	4	1
4	(England) Angela Smith	9	6	9	9
(Scotland) Alix Bostock	0	9	2	2
(South Africa) Sue Paton	7	9	7	9	9
(Australia) Bev Johnson	9	1	9	1	4
5	(Australia) Barbara Wall	9	9	9
(England) Lesley Moore	0	1	6
(Australia) Lyle Hubinger	9	9	9
(Sweden) Katarina Due-Boje	1	6	3
3	(England) Sue Cogswell	9	9	9
(England) Felicity Hargreaves	1	1	1
(England) Barbara Diggens	9	9	7	9
(Australia) Carin Clonda	3	1	9	5
6	(Australia) Sue King	9	9	9
(Australia) S. Wright	2	1	4
(England) Jayne Ashton	9	9	9
(England) Averil Morris	3	2	4
2	(Australia) Vicki Hoffman	9	9	9
(South Africa) Rene Aucamp	0	2	2
(South Africa) Valerie Bridgens	9	9	9
(Republic of Ireland) Barbara Sanderson	5	0	2
7	(Australia) Rhonda Thorne	9	9	9
(Scotland) Dorothy Sharp	1	3	4
(Australia) Margaret Zachariah	9	9	9
(England) Ruth Strauss	1	1	3

Third round
1	(Australia) McKay	9	9	9
(England) Lawes	3	7	3
8	(Australia) Anne Smith	9	9	9
(England) Maycock	0	6	0
4	(England) Angela Smith	9	7	9	9
(South Africa) Paton	0	9	3	4
5	(Australia) Wall	8	9	9	1	9
(Australia) Hubinger	10	5	5	9	5
3	(England) Cogswell	9	9	9
(England) Diggens	0	3	3
6	(Australia) King	9	9	9
(England) Ashton	7	5	3
2	(Australia) Hoffman	9	9	9
(South Africa) Bridgens	2	2	3
7	(Australia) Thorne	8	9	9	9
(Australia) Zachariah	10	5	7	3

Quarter-finals
1	(Australia) McKay	9	9	9
8	(Australia) Anne Smith	2	5	4
4	(England) Angela Smith	9	9	9
5	(Australia) Wall	5	3	3
3	(England) Cogswell	9	9	9
6	(Australia) King	1	1	0
2	(Australia) Hoffman	9	9	9
7	(Australia) Thorne	2	1	1

Semi-finals
1	(Australia) McKay	9	9	9	9
4	(England) Angela Smith	10	4	3	1
Final
1	(Australia) McKay	6	9	9	9
3	(England) Cogswell	9	3	1	4
3	(England) Cogswell	9	9	7	9
2	(Australia) Hoffman	6	5	9	7

=== Notes ===
This tournament was officially the first World Open but there was a significant unofficial invitation event held in 1976.

== See also ==
- World Open
- 1979 Men's World Open Squash Championship

Preceded by Australia (Brisbane); 1976	World Open; England (Sheffield); 1979	Succeeded by Canada (Toronto); 1981
