= 1981 Women's British Open Squash Championship =

British Open Squash Championships
- 53rd Women's British Open Championships

Details
- Location: Hove, England
- Venue: Coral Squash Club

The 1981 Women's Pretty Polly British Open Squash Championships was held at the Coral Squash Club in Hove from 20–26 February 1981. The event was won by Vicki Hoffman who defeated Margaret Zachariah in the final.

== Seeds ==
1. (Australia) Vicki Hoffman
2. (England) Sue Cogswell
3. (England) Angela Smith
4. (Australia) Rhonda Thorne (née Shapland)
5. (Guernsey) Martine Le Moignan
6. (Guernsey) Lisa Opie
7. (Australia) Sue King (née Newman)
8. (Australia) Rae Anderson

== First round ==
Player one	Player two	Score
(Australia) Vicki Hoffman		bye
(Canada) Beryl Paton	(Australia) Jan Shuttleworth	4-9 9-5 9-4 9-6

== Main Draw and results ==
Second round
1	(Australia) Vicki Hoffman
(England) Felicity Hargreaves
5	(Guernsey) Martine Le Moignan
(England) Jayne Ashton
8	(Australia) Rae Anderson
(England) Alison Cumings
4	(Australia) Rhonda Thorne
(New Zealand) Robyn Blackwood
(Australia) Margaret Zachariah
7	(Australia) Sue King
3	(England) Angela Smith
(England) Barbara Diggens
6	(Guernsey) Lisa Opie
(South Africa) Renee Aucamp
2	(England) Sue Cogswell
(England) Ruth Strauss

Third round
1	(Australia) Hoffman	9	9	2	3	9
(England) Hargreaves	0	3	9	9	4
5	(Guernsey) Le Moignan	9	7	9	10
(England) Ashton	1	9	7	8
8	(Australia) Anderson	9	5	9	9
(England) Cumings	5	9	7	1
4	(Australia) Thorne	9	9	9
(New Zealand) Blackwood	5	2	0
(Australia) Zachariah	9	4	9	9
7	(Australia) King	7	9	4	3
3	(England) Smith	9	9	9
(England) Diggens	0	2	6
6	(Guernsey) Opie	9	8	9	9
(South Africa) Aucamp	6	10	1	3
2	(England) Cogswell	9	3	9	9
(England) Strauss	4	9	7	7

Quarter finals
1	(Australia) Hoffman	9	9	0	9
5	(Guernsey) Le Moignan	2	3	9	7
8	(Australia) Anderson	9	9	10
4	(Australia) Thorne	4	5	8
(Australia) Zachariah	5	9	10	9
3	(England) Smith	9	7	9	6
6	(Guernsey) Opie	9	9	9
2	(England) Cogswell	5	2	4

Semi-finals
1	(Australia) Hoffman	9	9	6	9
8	(Australia) Anderson	3	1	9	4
Final
1	(England) Hoffman	9	9	9
(Australia) Zachariah	6	4	0
(Australia) Zachariah	9	10	9
6	(Guernsey) Opie	6	8	6

Preceded by 1980	British Open Squash Championships; England (Hove); 1981	Succeeded by 1982
