= 1980 Women's British Open Squash Championship =

British Open Squash Championships
- 52nd Women's British Open Championships

Details
- Location: Hove, England
- Venue: Coral Squash Club

The 1980 Women's Pretty Polly British Open Squash Championships was held at the Coral Squash Club in Hove from 23–28 February 1980. The event was won by Vicki Hoffman who defeated Sue Cogswell in the final.

== Seeds ==
1. (England) Sue Cogswell
2. (England) Angela Smith
3. (Australia) Vicki Hoffman
4. Unknown
5. (Australia) Margaret Zachariah
6. (Australia) Sue King (née Newman)
7. (England) Barbara Diggens
8. (England) Teresa Lawes
(Australia) Lesley Chapman (15th seed)

== Draw and results ==
Second round
1	(England) Sue Cogswell
(Australia) Rae Anderson
(England) Jayne Ashton
(Guernsey) Martine Le Moignan
5	(Australia) Margaret Zachariah
(England) Ruth Strauss
(England) Lesley Moore
(South Africa) Renee Aucamp
2	(England) Angela Smith
15	(Australia) Lesley Chapman
7	(England) Barbara Diggens
(Wales) Deanna Murray
6	(Australia) Sue King
(England) Alison Cumings
3	(Australia) Vicki Hoffman
(Australia) Barbara Oldfield

Third round
1	(England) Cogswell	9	9	9
(Australia) Anderson	0	1	6
(England) Ashton	9	9	3	9
(Guernsey) Le Moignan	2	6	9	3
5	(Australia) Zachariah	9	9	9
(England) Strauss	3	2	2
(England) Moore	9	10	3	9
(South Africa) Aucamp	3	8	9	4
2	(England) Smith	6	9	7	9	9
15	(Australia) Chapman	9	4	9	2	1
7	(England) Diggens	9	6	9	9
(Wales) Murray	2	9	2	1
6	(Australia) King	9	9	9
(England) Cumings	1	1	4
3	(Australia) Hoffman	9	9	7	9
(Australia) Oldfield	1	3	9	2

Quarter finals
1	(England) Cogswell	10	9	9
(England) Ashton	8	1	1
5	(Australia) Zachariah	10	9	9
(England) Moore	8	4	4
2	(England) Smith	9	9	9
7	(England) Diggens	0	0	2
3	(Australia) Hoffman	7	9	9	9
6	(Australia) King	9	3	2	0

Semi-finals
1	(England) Cogswell	9	9	9
5	(Australia) Zachariah	5	6	7
Final
1	(England) Cogswell	9	9	9
3	(Australia) Hoffman	5	5	3
2	(England) Smith	9	2	3	4
3	(Australia) Hoffman	7	9	9	9

Preceded by 1979	British Open Squash Championships; England (Hove); 1980	Succeeded by 1981
