= 1984 Women's British Open Squash Championship =

Squash tournament

British Open Squash Championships
- 56th Women's British Open Championships

Details
- Location: London, England
- Venue: Wembley Squash Centre

The 1984 Hi-Tec Women's British Open Squash Championships was held at the Wembley Squash Centre in London from 4–10 April 1984. Susan Devoy won her first title defeating Lisa Opie in the final.

== Seeds ==
(Guernsey) Lisa Opie (1)

(Australia) Rhonda Thorne (2)
(New Zealand) Susan Devoy (3/4)
(Guernsey) Martine Le Moignan (3/4)
(England) Angela Smith (5/8)
(England) Alison Cumings (5/8)
(New Zealand) Robyn Blackwood (5/8)
(England) Sue Cogswell (5/8)
(Australia) Jan Miller (9/16)
(England) Jayne Ashton (9/16)
(Australia) Carin Clonda (9/16)
(England) Ruth Strauss (9/16)
(Scotland) Heather Wallace (9/16)
(Australia) Rae Anderson (9/16)
(South Africa) Renee Aucamp (9/16)

(Australia) Lynne Ferry (9/16)

== Draw and results ==
=== First round ===
Player one	Player two	Score
(Guernsey) Lisa Opie	(Australia) Kim Johnstone	9-0 9-0 9-1
(Australia) Rhonda Thorne	(England) Flavia Roberts	9-0 9-3 9-1
(New Zealand) Susan Devoy	(England) Kerry Cawthorn	9-0 9-0 9-0
(Guernsey) Martine Le Moignan	(Netherlands) Mariëtte Remijnse	9-0 9-0 9-2
(England) Angela Smith	(England) Frances Candy	9-5 9-2 9-3
(England) Alison Cumings	(England) Averil Murphy	9-2 9-0 9-4
(New Zealand) Robyn Blackwood	(England) Sheila White	9-4 9-2 9-0
(England) Sue Cogswell	(England) Wendy Cole	9-0 9-1 9-1
(Australia) Jan Miller	(Republic of Ireland) Barbara Lowans	9-2 9-3 9-6
(England) Jayne Ashton	(England) Wendy Berry	9-2 9-2 9-5
(Australia) Carin Clonda	(England) Jill Benfield	9-0 9-0 9-2
(England) Ruth Strauss	(England) L Gillam	9-5 9-4 4-9 9-6
(Scotland) Heather Wallace	(England) Tracy Cunliffe	10-8 9-2 6-9 9-5
(Australia) Rae Anderson	(Australia) P Larkin	9-0 9-2 9-0
(South Africa) Renee Aucamp	(South Africa) Donna Caldwell	9-4 9-1 10-9
(Australia) Lynne Ferry	(Australia) P Wignall	9-0 9-0 9-1
(Australia) Michelle Toon	(Wales) Debbie Turnbull	1-9 9-5 9-6 9-4
(England) Claire Oxley	(Republic of Ireland) Mary Byrne	9-0 9-1 9-3
(Australia) Robyn Belford	(England) Carolyn Mett	9-2 9-1 9-4
(Australia) Cath Bellemore	(South Africa) Debby Ashby	9-2 9-1 3-9 9-0
(Australia) Tracey Smith	(Sweden) Katerina Due-Boje	9-3 4-9 9-6 9-2
(England) Karen Butterworth	(England) Lorraine Harlow	9-4 9-6 9-4
(England) Sandra Wrench	(England) Oona Prendiville	10-8 9-0 6-9 10-8
(New Zealand) Donna Gurran	(England) Senga Macfie	9-5 9-0 9-2
(England) Barbara Diggens	(England) Annette Pilling	9-3 9-3 9-5
(England) Alex Cowie	(England) Joyce Tuomey	9-5 9-0 9-3
(England) Lucy Soutter	(England) Melanie Warren-Hawkes	9-0 9-2 9-0
(New Zealand) Joanne Williams	(England) Janet Partington	4-9 9-0 9-7 9-7
(Australia) Barbara Wall	(Republic of Ireland) Rebecca Best	8-10 9-7 10-8 9-4
(Australia) Liz Irving	(England) Fiona Geaves	9-0 9-2 9-6
(England) Liz Brown	(Netherlands) Mandy Sommers	9-0 9-0 10-8
(England) Nicky Spurgeon	(Netherlands) Marietta Peters	9-2 9-2 9-0

=== Second round ===
Player one	Player two	Score
(Australia) Miller	(Australia) Toon	9-3 9-0 9-0
(England) Smith A	(England) Oxley	9-6 9-5 9-6
(England) Cogswell	(Australia) Belford	4-9 9-6 9-7 9-0
(Guernsey) Le Moignan	(Australia) Bellemore	9-3 9-3 10-8
(Guernsey) Opie	(Australia) Smith T	9-1 9-2 5-9 9-7
(Australia) Thorne	(England) Butterworth	9-3 9-3 9-5
(New Zealand) Devoy	(England) Wrench	9-0 9-1 9-2
(Australia) Blackwood	(New Zealand) Gurran	9-3 9-5 10-8
(England) Spurgeon	(England) Cumings	8-10 9-7 9-4 2-9 9-5
(England) Ashton	(England) Diggens	10-8 8-10 9-4 7-9 9-3
(Australia) Clonda	(England) Cowie	6-9 7-9 9-3 10-8 9-5
(England) Brown	(England) Strauss	9-6 9-3 9-7
(Scotland) Wallace	(New Zealand) Williams	4-9 9-0 9-7 9-7
(England) Soutter	(Australia) Ferry	9-4 10-8 9-5
(Australia) Anderson	(Australia) Wall	10-9 10-9 9-2
(South Africa) Aucamp	(Australia) Irving	3-9 9-1 9-6 9-4

=== Third round ===
Player one	Player two	Score
(Australia) Miller	(England) Spurgeon	4-9 9-4 9-3 9-0
(England) Smith	(England) Ashton	9-5 10-8 0-9 9-5
(England) Cogswell	(Australia) Clonda	6-9 9-7 9-1 9-3
(Guernsey) Le Moignan	(England) Brown	9-1 9-0 9-3
(Guernsey) Opie	(Scotland) Wallace	9-5 9-1 9-0
(Australia) Thorne	(England) Soutter	9-2 9-2 9-2
(New Zealand) Devoy	(Australia) Anderson	9-5 9-2 9-1
(Australia) Blackwood	(South Africa) Aucamp	9-5 9-5 9-0

=== Quarter-finals ===
Player one	Player two	Score
(Guernsey) Le Moignan	(Australia) Miller	9-3 9-1 9-5
(Guernsey) Opie	(England) Smith	9-5 9-1 10-8
(Australia) Thorne	(England) Cogswell	9-5 9-4 9-3
(New Zealand) Devoy	(Australia) Blackwood	9-4 9-3 9-4

=== Semi-finals ===
Player one	Player two	Score
(New Zealand) Devoy	(Australia) Thorne	4-9 9-4 9-3 9-0
(Guernsey) Opie	(Guernsey) Le Moignan	8-10 9-5 10-9 9-3

=== Final ===
Player one	Player two	Score
(New Zealand) Devoy	(Guernsey) Opie	5-9 9-0 9-7 9-1

Preceded by 1983	British Open Squash Championships; England (London); 1984	Succeeded by 1985
