= 1981 Women's World Open Squash Championship =

Annual edition of the Women's World Squash Championship

1981 Women's World Open
- 3rd Women's World Squash Championship
- Location: Toronto, Canada
- Date: 17–23 October 1981
- Category: World Open
- Prize money: $12,500

Results
- Champion: (Australia) Rhonda Thorne
- Runner-up: (Australia) Vicki Cardwell
- Semi-finalists: (England) Angela Smith (England) Lisa Opie

The 1981 Women's World Open Squash Championship was the women's edition of the 1981 World Open, which serves as the individual world championship for squash players. The event took place in Toronto in Canada, from 17-23 October 1981.

Rhonda Thorne won the World Open title, defeating Vicki Cardwell in the final.

== Seeds ==
1. (Australia) Vicki Cardwell (final)
2. (Australia) Rhonda Thorne (champion)
3. (England) Sue Cogswell (quarterfinals)
4. (Australia) Margaret Zachariah (quarterfinals)
5. (England) Angela Smith (semifinals)
6. (England) Lisa Opie (semifinals)
7. (Australia) Rae Anderson (third round)
8. (Guernsey) Martine Le Moignan (quarterfinals)
9. 9
10. (New Zealand) Annette Owen

== Draw and results ==
=== First round ===
Team one	Team two	Score
(Australia) Vicki Cardwell (1)	(New Zealand) Robyn Blackwood	9-0 9-4 9–4
(Australia) Rhonda Thorne (2)	(Republic of Ireland) Rebecca Best	
(New Zealand) Susan Devoy	(Zimbabwe) Sonje Bromhead	9-1 10-8 9–0
(Republic of Ireland) Geraldine Barniville	(New Zealand) Annette Owen (10)	10-8 3-9 2-9 9-6 10–8
(New Zealand) Joanne Milne	(Sweden) Eva Lundqvist	9-2 9-2 9–0
(Australia) Margaret Zachariah	(New Zealand) Donna Gurran	7-9 6-9 9-1 9-2 9–6
(England) Alison Cumings	(Republic of Ireland) Ann Sheppard	
(Republic of Ireland) Marjorie Burke	(Zimbabwe) Terry Ann Stewart	
(Republic of Ireland) Kyra Stewart	(Wales) Heather Bleach	
(Australia) Barabar Oldfield	(Republic of Ireland) Barbara Lowans	

=== Second round to final ===
Second round
1	(Australia) Vicki Cardwell
(England) Alison Cumings
8	(Guernsey) Martine Le Moignan
(Australia) Barbara Wall
5	(England) Angela Smith	9	9	9
(New Zealand) Joanne Milne	0	3	0
(Australia) Barbara Oldfield
4	(Australia) Margaret Zachariah
(New Zealand) Susan Devoy	6	9	9	2	10
(Scotland) Heather Wallace	9	4	0	9	8
2	(Australia) Rhonda Thorne
(England) Lesley Moore
10	(England) Barbara Diggens
7	(Australia) Rae Anderson
6	(Guernsey) Lisa Opie
(England) Jayne Ashton
3	(England) Sue Cogswell
(England) Ruth Strauss

Third round
1	(Australia) Cardwell	9	9	9
(England) Cumings	0	7	3
8	(Guernsey) Le Moignan	1	10	9	9
(Australia) Wall	9	8	3	1
5	(England) Smith	9	9	9
(Australia) Oldfield	2	4	3
4	(Australia) Zachariah	9	9	2	9
(New Zealand) Devoy	0	6	9	7
2	(Australia) Thorne	9	9	6	9
(England) Moore	1	0	9	3
10	(England) Diggens	9	2	9	9
7	(Australia) Anderson	4	9	6	4
6	(Guernsey) Opie	9	7	9	9
(England) Ashton	1	9	4	4
3	(England) Cogswell	9	9	10
(England) Strauss	1	6	8

Quarter-finals
1	(Australia) Cardwell	9	9	9
8	(Guernsey) Le Moignan	1	5	3
5	(England) Smith	9	9	10
4	(Australia) Zachariah	2	2	9
2	(Australia) Thorne	9	9	9
10	(England) Diggens	2	1	1
6	(Guernsey) Opie	8	9	7	9	9
3	(England) Cogswell	10	4	9	3	2

Semi-finals
1	(Australia) Cardwell	9	9	9
5	(England) Smith	0	7	1
Final
1	(Australia) Cardwell	10	4	5	9	7
2	(Australia) Thorne	8	9	9	7	9
2	(Australia) Thorne	9	9	9
6	(Guernsey) Opie	2	0	4

== See also ==
- World Open
- 1981 Men's World Open Squash Championship

Preceded by England (Sheffield); 1979	World Open; Canada (Toronto); 1981	Succeeded by Perth (Australia); 1983
