= 1977 Women's British Open Squash Championship =

Squash tournament

British Open Squash Championships
- 49th Women's British Open Championships

Details
- Location: London, England
- Venue: Wembley

The 1977 Women's British Open Squash Championships was held at Wembley in London from 25 February to 3 March 1977.

Heather McKay (née Blundell) won her sixteenth consecutive title defeating Barbara Wall in the final. The 1977 final saw the first ever all professional final and the first unseeded player (Wall) in a final. Sue Cogswell became the first woman to take a game from Heather McKay since Marion Jackman in 1972 and the first in the British Open since 1964.

== Seeds ==
1. (Australia) Heather McKay (née Blundell)
2. (Australia) Margaret Zachariah
3. (England) Angela Smith
4. (England) Sue Cogswell
5. (England) Karen Gardner
6. (England) Teresa Lawes
7. (Northern Ireland) Irene Hewitt
8. (Australia) Rhonda Shapland

== Draw and results ==
=== First round ===
Player one	Player two	Score
(Australia) Heather McKay	(Scotland) Pat Green	9-0 9-0 9-0
(Australia) Margaret Zachariah		
(England) Angela Smith	(England) J Francis	9-0 9-3 9-1
(England) Sue Cogswell	(England) Sandra Wrench	9-1 9-0 9-1
(England) Karen Gardner	(England) Felicity Hargreaves	9-1 9-2 9-0
(England) Teresa Lawes	(England) E Elgood	9-3 9-7 9-2
(Northern Ireland) Irene Hewitt		
(Australia) Rhonda Shapland	(England) Ruth Turner	9-3 9-2 9-1
(Northern Ireland) Dorothy Armstrong	(England) M Robinson	9-4 9-0 9-2
(England) Theo Johnson	(England) P H Campbell	9-1 7-9 9-3 3-9 9-2
(England) Soraya Haye		
(Australia) Barbara Wall		
(England) Carol Machin	(England) Joyce Tuomey	9-1 9-2 9-4
(England) Lesley Moore		
(England) Vivian Grisogono	(England) F R Corbett	4-9 10-8 6-9 9-1 9-5
(England) Jane Ashton	(England) Alison Cumings	9-3 9-2 9-1
(England) Ruth Strauss	(England) J Griffith	9-2 9-0 9-0
(England) A F Morris		
(England) Patricia Millman		
(Republic of Ireland) Dr Barbara Sanderson	(Pakistan) Rukshana Rashid	5-9 10-8 9-2 9-10 9-2
(England) C Shapman	(Australia) C O'Neill	9-7 9-5 9-3
(Scotland) Dorothy Sharp		
(England) J Jones		
(England) L McLoughlin	(Canada) E O'Gorman	9-1 9-0 9-1
(England) S Findlay	(England) J Flood	9-4 9-3 9-4
(Republic of Ireland) Dr Geraldine Barniville	(England) H Simpson	9-3 6-9 9-4 9-4
(England) Fran Marshall	(England) Ann Jee	9-4 9-4 3-9 9-2
(Wales) Deanna Murray	(England) C Tricker	9-4 9-1 9-2
(England) Claire Chapman		
(England) Ann Price	(Sweden) Katerina Due-Boje	5-9 9-2 9-4 9-6
(England) B Bucknall	(England) J Tosier	5-9 9-2 4-9 9-5 9-2
(England) C Sullivan		

=== Second round ===
Player one	Player two	Score
(Australia) McKay	(England) Strauss	9-0 9-0 9-0
(England) Smith	(England) Morris	9-0 9-0 9-5
(England) Cogswell	(England) Millman	9-0 9-1 9-0
(England) Lawes	(Republic of Ireland) Sanderson	9-2 9-0 10-8
(Northern Ireland) Hewitt	(England) Shapman	
(Northern Ireland) Armstrong	(Scotland) Sharp	1-9 9-4 9-3 9-4
(Australia) Zachariah	(England) Jones	9-0 9-2 9-2
(England) Johnson	(England) McLoughlin	9-1 9-2 9-4
(England) Haye	(England) Findlay	9-7 9-7 9-2
(Australia) Shapland	(Republic of Ireland) Barniville	9-7 9-6 8-10 9-6
(Australia) Wall	(England) Marshall	9-5 9-1 9-3
(England) Gardner	(Wales) Murray	5-9 8-10 9-4 9-1 9-7
(England) Machin	(England) Chapman	9-6 9-5 9-3
(England) Moore	(England) Price	9-2 9-0 9-2
(England) Grisogono	(England) Bucknall	9-5 9-6 10-8
(England) Ashton	(England) Sullivan	9-5 9-0 9-1

=== Third round ===
Player one	Player two	Score
(Australia) McKay	(England) Grisogono	9-1 9-1 9-0
(England) Smith	(England) Hayes	
(England) Cogswell	(England) Ashton	9-6 10-8 9-1
(Australia) Wall	(Northern Ireland) Hewitt	9-3 9-4 9-6
(Australia) Shapland	(Northern Ireland) Armstrong	8-10 9-7 9-6 9-7
(England) Gardner	(England) Johnson	9-2 9-1 9-4
(England) Lawes	(England) Machin	9-3 9-2 9-2
(Australia) Zachariah	(England) Moore	9-0 9-0 9-2

=== Quarter-finals ===
Player one	Player two	Score
(Australia) McKay	(Australia) Shapland	9-1 9-1 9-0
(England) Cogswell	(England) Gardner	9-0 9-3 9-1
(England) Smith	(England) Lawes	9-4 9-0 9-1
(Australia) Wall	(Australia) Zachariah	3-9 5 10-8 9-7

=== Semi-finals ===
Player one	Player two	Score
(Australia) McKay	(England) Cogswell	9-5 9-7 5-9 9-0
(Australia) Wall	(England) Smith	9-4 6-9 4-9 9-3 9-6

=== Final ===
Player one	Player two	Score
(Australia) McKay	(Australia) Wall	9-3 9-1 9-2

Preceded by 1976	British Open Squash Championships; England (London); 1977	Succeeded by 1978
