= 1978 Women's British Open Squash Championship =

British Open Squash Championships
- 50th Women's British Open Championships

Details
- Location: London, England
- Venue: Wembley

The 1978 Women's British Open Squash Championships was held at Wembley in London from 24 February - 2 March 1978. Heather McKay (née Blundell) announced that she was semi-retired and would not compete in the British Open again after a remarkable run of sixteen consecutive title wins. The 1978 event was won by Sue Newman who defeated Vicky Hoffman in the final.

== Seeds ==
1. (England) Sue Cogswell
2. (Australia) Sue Newman
3. (Australia) Margaret Zachariah
4. (Australia) Vicki Hoffman
5. (Australia) Anne Smith
6. (Australia) Barbara Wall
7. (England) Angela Smith
8. (Australia) Lyle Hubinger

== Draw and results ==
=== First round ===
Player One	Player Two	Score
(England) Sue Cogswell		
(Australia) Sue Newman	(England) Eve Methven	9-3 9-4 9-7
(Australia) Margaret Zachariah	(England) Vivian Grisogono	9-1 9-5 9-5
(Australia) Vicki Hoffman	(England) J Jester	9-0 9-0 9-0
(Australia) Anne Smith	(England) Theo Johnson	9-4 9-3 9-4
(Australia) Barbara Wall	(Sweden) Tina Dahl	9-0 9-0 9-4
(England) Angela Smith		
(Australia) Lyle Hubinger	(England) E Bowles	9-0 9-3 9-2
(England) Barbara Diggens	(Australia) Janet Honeycombe	9-0 10-8 9-1
(Australia) Rhonda Shapland	(England) Fran Marshall	10-8 3-9 9-6 0-3
(New Zealand) Jenny Webster		
(New Zealand) Pam Buckingham		
(England) Lesley Moore		
(Northern Ireland) Irene Hewitt		
(England) J Sutton		
(Sweden) Katerina Due-Boje		
(New Zealand) Robyn Davis		
(New Zealand) Jane Wood		
(Wales) Deanna Murray		
(England) A F Morris		
(England) J Malan		
(England) J Griffiths		
(England) S Dunford		
(England) Jayne Ashton		
(England) Teresa Lawes		
(England) Joyce Maycock		

=== Second round ===
Player One	Player Two	Score
(Australia) Cogswell		
(Australia) Newman	(England) Wood	9-4 9-5 9-6
(Australia) Zachariah	(Wales) Murray	9-4 9-7 9-2
(Australia) Hoffman	(England) Dunford	9-4 9-2 9-0
(Australia) Smith Anne	(England) Malan	9-0 9-1 9-0
(Australia) Wall	(England) Griffiths	9-3 9-0 9-3
(England) Smith Angela		
(Australia) Hubinger	(England) Morris	9-1 9-2 9-2
(New Zealand) Webster	(England) Hewitt	7-9 9-5 9-0 9-3
(New Zealand) Buckingham	(England) Sutton	9-2 9-1 9-2
(Australia) Shapland	(Sweden) Due-Boje	9-4 9-0 9-5
(England) Moore	(New Zealand) Davis	9-6 5-9 9-5 9-1
(England) Maycock		
(England) Ashton		
(England) Diggens		
(England) Lawes		

=== Third round ===
Player One	Player Two	Score
(England) Cogswell	(England) Moore	9-1 9-5 9-0
(Australia) Newman	(England) Maycock	9-0 9-5 9-1
(Australia) Zachariah	(Australia) Shapland	7-9 0-9 2-9
(Australia) Hoffman	(New Zealand) Webster	9-0 9-4 9-3
(Australia) Smith Anne	(England) Ashton	7-9 10-8 8-10 6-9
(Australia) Wall	(England) Diggens	1-9 9-6 10-9 9-5
(England) Smith Angela	(England) Lawes	9-3 9-4 9-1
(Australia) Hubinger	(New Zealand) Buckingham	9-2 5-9 9-5 9-4

=== Quarter finals ===
Player One	Player Two	Score
(England) Cogswell	(Australia) Hubinger	9-6 9-5 9-3
(Australia) Newman	(England) Smith Angela	9-2 9-1 9-7
(Australia) Hoffman	(England) Ashton	9-1 9-0 9-4
(Australia) Wall	(Australia) Shapland	3-9 4-9 8-10

=== Semi finals ===
Player One	Player Two	Score
(Australia) Newman	(Australia) Shapland	9-5 6-9 10-9 9-4
(Australia) Hoffman	(England) Cogswell	9-6 9-5 9-3

=== Final ===
Player One	Player Two	Score
(Australia) Newman	(Australia) Hoffman	9-4 9-7 9-2

Preceded by 1977	British Open Squash Championships; England (London); 1978	Succeeded by 1979
