= 1975 Women's British Open Squash Championship =

British Open Squash Championships
- 47th Women's British Open Championships

Details
- Location: London, England
- Venue: Wembley

The 1975 Women's Langham Life Assurance British Open Squash Championships was held at Wembley in London from 28 February - 6 March 1975. Heather McKay (née Blundell) won her fourteenth consecutive title defeating Marion Jackman in the final. The domination shown by Heather McKay was evident in the fact that she remained unbeaten in any competition since December 1962.

== Seeds ==
1. (Australia) Heather McKay (née Blundell)
2. (Australia) Marion Jackman

(England) Sue Cogswell
(Australia) Sue Newman
(Australia) Margaret Zachariah
(England) Jean Wilson
(England) Teresa Lawes

(England) Jane Courtney

== Draw and results ==
=== First round ===
Player one	Player two	Score
(Australia) Heather McKay	(England) Mary Rust	9-0 9-0 9-0
(Australia) Marion Jackman	(South Africa) D Allen	9-2 9-1 9-3
(England) Sue Cogswell	(Republic of Ireland) Geraldine Barniville	7-9 9-4 9-3 8-10 9-3
(Australia) Sue Newman	(England) Di Fuller	9-4 9-3 9-2
(Australia) Margaret Zachariah	(England) A H Morris	9-2 9-0 9-2
(Australia) Chris van Nierop	(England) E Popplewell	9-1 9-4 9-3
(Australia) Lyle Hubinger	(England) A Manley	9-3 9-3 9-0
(England) Jane Courtney	(England) J Cartwright	9-1 9-0 9-2
(England) Teresa Lawes	(England) Soraya Haye	9-2 9-0 9-1
(England) Jean Wilson	(England) Ann Price	9-0 9-5 9-2
(England) Karen Gardner	(England) P Leneham	9-1 9-0 9-4
(Australia) Carol Murray	(England) S Vesperinan	9-2 9-2 9-5
(England) Fran Marshall	(England) Jane Pritchett	9-7 9-1 9-2
(England) Claire Chapman	(England) V Corbett	9-4 9-0 9-6
(South Africa) Valerie Bridgens	(England) L Morrison	9-4 9-7 9-4
(England) Clair Richards	(England) J McColl	2-9 9-3 9-3 9-0
(Northern Ireland) Dorothy Armstrong	(England) L M Pyke	9-4 9-6 9-4
(Wales) Deanna Murray	(England) Jayne Ashton	6-9 9-7 9-6 9-2
(England) Lesley Moore	(England) Jane Poynder	6-9 9-4 9-3 9-2
(Republic of Ireland) Janet Ward	(England) S Parker	9-2 9-3 9-0
(England) Jean Reynolds (née McFarlane)	(England) H James	9-6 9-2 9-3
(Northern Ireland) Irene Hewitt	(England) H Campbell	9-4 9-0 9-6
(England) Ann Jee	(England) J Macey	9-4 9-0 9-3
(England) S Dunford	(England) Vivian Grisogono	9-4 8-10 9-6 9-3
(England) Sue Pexman	(Republic of Ireland) Barbara Sanderson	2-9 6-9 9-6 9-4 9-2
(England) S Peach	(England) J Lynas	9-6 9-4 9-3
(England) Dianne Corbett	(England) S Findlay	9-2 7-9 9-0 9-0
(England) J Sheasby	(England) Janet Ledger	9-1 9-7 6-9 9-6
(England) Janice Wainwright	(England) Ruth Turner	9-6 9-1 9-0
(England) Carol Machin	(England) S Warnes	9-2 4-9 9-6 9-1
(England) Theo Veltman		
(England) Joyce Maycock		

=== Second round ===
Player one	Player two	Score
(Australia) McKay	(England) Richards	w/o
(Australia) Jackman	(England) Maycock	9-2 9-1 9-2
(England) Cogswell	(Northern Ireland) Armstrong	9-3 9-3 9-0
(Australia) Newman	(Wales) Murray	9-1 9-1 9-0
(Australia) Zachariah	(England) Moore	9-1 9-1 9-0
(Australia) van Nierop	(Republic of Ireland) Ward	9-0 9-2 9-1
(Australia) Hubinger	(England) Reynolds	9-2 9-2 9-2
(England) Courtney	(Northern Ireland) Hewitt	5-9 9-6 7-9 5-9
(England) Lawes	(England) Jee	9-4 5-9 9-1 9-2
(England) Wilson	(England) Dunford	9-1 9-0 9-4
(England) Gardner	(England) Pexman	9-2 9-4 9-7
(Australia) Murray C	(England) Peach	9-2 9-4 9-2
(England) Marshall	(England) Corbett	9-5 9-4 9-2
(England) Chapman	(England) Sheasby	9-5 9-1 0-9 9-3
(South Africa) Bridgens	(England) Wainwright	4-9 9-5 9-7 2-9 9-0
(England) Veltman	(England) Machin	5-9 9-2 9-0 9-7

=== Third round ===
Player one	Player two	Score
(Australia) McKay	(Australia) Murray	9-1 9-0 9-0
(Australia) Jackman	(South Africa) Bridgens	9-1 9-3 9-10 9-1
(Australia) Newman	(England) Gardner	9-2 9-1 9-5
(Australia) Zachariah	(England) Veltman	4-9 9-5 9-2 9-0
(Australia) Van Nierop	(England) Lawes	9-6 9-5 2-9 9-2
(Northern Ireland) Hewitt	(England) Marshall	9-1 9-5 5-9 9-1
(Australia) Hubinger	(England) Wilson	9-6 9-7 9-0
(England) Cogswell	(England) Chapman	10-8 9-1 9-3

=== Quarter-finals ===
Player one	Player two	Score
(Australia) McKay	(Australia) Van Nierop	9-1 9-2 9-0
(Australia) Jackman	(Northern Ireland) Hewitt	9-5 9-2 9-2
(Australia) Newman	(Australia) Hubinger	9-5 9-1 10-8
(Australia) Zachariah	(England) Cogswell	9-1 9-5 9-3

=== Semi-finals ===
Player one	Player two	Score
(Australia) McKay	(Australia) Zachariah	9-1 9-0 9-1
(Australia) Jackman	(Australia) Newman	7-9 9-4 9-10 9-1 9-6

=== Third-place play-off ===
Player one	Player two	Score
(Australia) Newman	(Australia) Zachariah	9-1 9-6 6-9 9-7

=== Final ===
Player one	Player two	Score
(Australia) McKay	(Australia) Jackman	9-3 9-1 9-5

Preceded by 1974	British Open Squash Championships; England (London); 1975	Succeeded by 1976
