= 1976 Women's British Open Squash Championship =

British Open Squash Championships
- 48th Women's British Open Championships

Details
- Location: London, England
- Venue: Wembley

The 1976 Women's British Open Squash Championships was held at Wembley in London from 27 February - 4 March 1976. Heather McKay (née Blundell) won her fifteenth consecutive title defeating Sue Newman in the final.

== Seeds ==
1. (Australia) Heather McKay (née Blundell)
2. (Australia) Sue Newman
3. (England) Sue Cogswell
4. (England) Angela Smith
5. (England) Teresa Lawes
6. (Northern Ireland) Irene Hewitt
7. (England) Jane Courtney
8. (England) Karen Gardner

== Draw and results ==
=== First round ===
Player one	Player two	Score
(England) Sue Cogswell	(England) M Robinson	9-0 9-0 9-1
(England) Angela Smith	(Wales) Deanna Murray	9-0 9-0 9-1
(England) Teresa Lawes	(England) J Sheasby	9-5 9-2 9-2
(Northern Ireland) Irene Hewitt	(Scotland) Alix Bostock	9-2 9-6 9-4
(England) Jane Courtney	(England) E Gubbay	9-1 9-0 9-0
(England) Karen Gardner	(England) Ruth Turner	9-4 9-3 9-0
(England) Alex Cowie	(Rhodesia) Miss Pam Haig	9-1 9-4 9-4
(England) Tessa Lawrence	(England) Soraya Haye	9-1 9-2 9-2
(England) Barbara Diggens	(England) Ann Price	9-2 9-0 9-7
(Rhodesia) Mrs Sue Paton	(Republic of Ireland) Barbara Sanderson	9-2 9-3 9-6
(England) Theo Johnson	(England) J Francis	9-7 9-2 10-8
(England) Carol Machin	(England) J Griffith	9-1 9-1 9-4
(England) Fran Marshall	(England) Janet Ledger	9-0 9-2 9-2
(South Africa) Miss D Prosser	(England) J Flood	9-0 9-2 9-1
(England) Lesley Moore	(England) S Findlay	9-5 9-0 9-0
(England) Jane Poynder	(England) Bobs Whitehead	9-3 9-5 9-7
(England) Patricia Millman	(England) Lynn Crosbie	10-9 9-0 6-9 9-2
(England) J Graydon	(England) Joyce Tuomey	7-9 9-2 9-3 9-3
(England) P H Campbell	(England) C Wood	9-2 10-8 9-3
(England) Dianne Corbett	(England) Clair Richards	9-2 9-2 9-4
(Australia) Deborah Holland	(England) G Jafier	9-3 9-0 9-2
(England) Jane Ashton	(England) P Lenehan	9-1 9-3 9-4
(England) Faith Sinclair	(England) Jean Reynolds (née McFarlane)	10-8 9-0 9-6
(Northern Ireland) Dorothy Armstrong	(England) C Sullivan	9-3 9-4 9-5
(England) Vivian Grisogono	(England) S Dunford	9-3 9-7 9-4
(England) Joyce Maycock		bye
(Australia) Heather McKay		bye
(Australia) Sue Newman		bye
(England) A F Morris		bye
(England) Claire Chapman		bye
(England) J Macey		bye

=== Second round ===
Player one	Player two	Score
(Australia) Newman	(England) Moore	9-1 9-2 9-1
(England) Cogswell	(England) Poynder	9-3 9-2 9-1
(England) Smith	(England) Millman	9-2 9-1 9-0
(England) Lawes	(England) Morris	9-1 9-2 9-6
(Northern Ireland) Hewitt	(England) Graydon	9-0 9-1 9-2
(England) Courtney	(England) Campbell	9-0 9-0 9-0
(England) Gardner	(England) Corbett	9-4 9-3 9-2
(England) Cowie	(Australia) Holland	9-10 10-8 9-6 1-9 8-10
(England) Diggens	(England) Macey	8-10 9-2 9-2 9-4
(Rhodesia) Paton	(England) Ashton	7-9 9-7 9-3 10-8
(England) Johnson	(England) Sinclair	9-3 9-6 9-2
(England) Machin	(England) Lawrence	9-4 9-5 9-7
(England) Chapman	(Northern Ireland) Armstrong	9-7 9-3 5-9 9-4
(England) Marshall	(England) Grisogono	9-6 9-2 9-7
(England) Maycock	(South Africa) Prosser	10-9 9-1 9-0

=== Third round ===
Player one	Player two	Score
(Australia) McKay	(Rhodesia) Paton	9-2 9-2 9-1
(Australia) Newman	(England) Johnson	9-5 9-5 9-2
(England) Cogswell	(England) Machin	9-5 9-0 9-?
(England) Lawes	(England) Chapman	9-7 9-1 9-1
(England) Gardner	(Australia) Holland	9-4 9-5 9-0
(England) Diggens	(England) Courtney	9-10 10-9 9-3 9-4
(England) Smith	(England) Maycock	2-9 9-2 10-8 9-?
(Northern Ireland) Hewitt	(England) Marshall	9-1 9-2 5-9 10-8

=== Quarter-finals ===
Player one	Player two	Score
(Australia) McKay	(England) Gardner	9-0 9-0 9-0
(Australia) Newman	(England) Diggens	9-1 9-2 9-4
(England) Lawes	(England) Smith	9-5 9-3 7-9 5-9 10-8
(England) Cogswell	(England) Hewitt	10-8 0 10-8

=== Semi-finals ===
Player one	Player two	Score
(Australia) McKay	(England) Lawes	9-2 9-1 9-1
(Australia) Newman	(England) Cogswell	9-0 9-10 9-6 4-9 9-6

=== Final ===
Player one	Player two	Score
(Australia) McKay	(Australia) Newman	9-2 9-4 9-2

Preceded by 1975	British Open Squash Championships; England (London); 1976	Succeeded by 1977
