= 1976 Women's World Open Squash Championship =

1976 women's squash tournament

Women's World Open 1976
- 1st Women's World Squash Championship
- Location: Brisbane, Australia
- Date: 18–23 August 1976
- Category: World Open

Results
- Champion: (Australia) Heather McKay
- Runner-up: (Australia) Marion Jackman
- Semi-finalists: (Australia) Margaret Zachariah (Australia) Sue Newman

The 1976 Women's World Open Squash Championship was the inaugural women's edition of the 1976 World Open, which serves as the individual world championship for squash players.

The event took place at the Stafford Courts in Brisbane in Australia, from 18 to 23 August 1976. Heather McKay won the World Open title, defeating Marion Jackman in the final in just 22 minutes. McKay picked up $2,000 (the biggest winning cheque of her career) for winning the competition.

== Results ==
=== First round ===
Player One	Player Two	Score
(Australia) Heather McKay	(Australia) Robyn Prentice	9-2 9-0 9-0
(Australia) Margaret Zachariah	(Canada) Barbara Savage	9-1 9-0 9-0
(Australia) Sue Newman	(England) Joyce Maycock	9-2 9-3 9-6
(Australia) Marion Jackman	(South Africa) Sue Paton	9-4 9-3 9-5
(New Zealand) Jenny Webster	(Northern Ireland) Irene Hewitt	9-5 9-3 9-3
(South Africa) Jill Eckstein	(Canada) Beryl Paton	9-2 9-1 9-4
(England) Sue Cogswell	(New Zealand) Annette Owen	9-5 9-3 9-5
(Australia) Chris van Nierop	(Northern Ireland) Dorothy Armstrong	10-8 9-2 9-2
(Republic of Ireland) Geraldine Barniville	(Canada) Jane Dixon	9-6 9-0 9-2
(Australia) Rhonda Shapland	(South Africa) Kathy Hardy	9-2 2-9 9-3 2-9 9-5
(Australia) Lyle Hubinger	(Canada) Penny Glover	9-1 9-0 9-2
(New Zealand) Pam Buckingham	(Australia) G. Hughes	9-0 9-7 9-4
(South Africa) Gay Erskine	(New Zealand) Jane Wood	9-2 10-9 9-5
(South Africa) Valerie Bridgens	(England) Angela Smith	9-4 2-9 4-9 10-9 9-1
(Australia) Jenny Irving	(England) Karen Gardner	10-8 9-2 5-9 8-10 9-1
(Australia) Linda Musumeci	(Canada) Inge Weber	9-0 9-2 9-3

=== Second round ===
Player One	Player Two	Score
(Australia) Heather McKay	(Republic of Ireland) Geraldine Barniville	9-0 9-0 9-1
(Australia) Margaret Zachariah	(Australia) Rhonda Shapland	9-4 9-2 9-3
(Australia) Sue Newman	(Australia) Lyle Hubinger	9-4 9-0 9-5
(Australia) Marion Jackman	(New Zealand) Pam Buckingham	9-1 9-6 6-9 9-3
(New Zealand) Jenny Webster	(South Africa) Gay Erskine	5-9 9-3 9-7 9-7
(South Africa) Jill Eckstein	(South Africa) Valerie Bridgens	6-9 9-7 9-0 4-9 9-0
(England) Sue Cogswell	(Australia) Jenny Irving	9-6 9-4 9-2
(Australia) Chris van Nierop	(Australia) Linda Musumeci	9-3 9-0 9-4

=== Quarter-finals ===
Player One	Player Two	Score
(Australia) Heather McKay	(New Zealand) Jenny Webster	9-1 9-1 9-1
(Australia) Margaret Zachariah	(South Africa) Jill Eckstein	9-3 9-6 9-0
(Australia) Sue Newman	(England) Sue Cogswell	9-5 9-5 9-4
(Australia) Marion Jackman	(Australia) Chris van Nierop	9-5 9-5 10-8

=== Semi-finals ===
Player One	Player Two	Score
(Australia) Heather McKay	(Australia) Margaret Zachariah	9-1 9-4 9-1
(Australia) Marion Jackman	(Australia) Sue Newman	9-1 9-5 9-3

=== Final ===
Player One	Player Two	Score
(Australia) Heather McKay	(Australia) Marion Jackman	9-2 9-2 9-0

== See also ==
- World Open
- 1976 Men's World Open Squash Championship

Preceded by None; First edition	World Open; Brisbane (Australia); 1976	Succeeded by Sheffield (England); 1979
