= 1983 Women's British Open Squash Championship =

British Open Squash Championships
- 55th Women's British Open Championships

Details
- Location: Derby, England
- Venue: Assembly Rooms

The 1983 Women's Davies & Tate British Open Squash Championships was held at the Assembly Rooms in Derby from 6–14 April 1983. The event was won for the fourth consecutive year by Vicki Cardwell (née Hoffman) who defeated Lisa Opie in a repeat of the 1982 final. Vicki Cardwell made the shock announcement that she was going to retire after the 1983 World Open. The Australian was serving a two-year team events ban in her home country following misconduct in the 1981 Women's World Open Squash Championship.

== Draw and results ==
=== First round ===
Player one	Player two	Score
(Australia) Vicki Cardwell	(England) Kerry Cawthorn	9-1 9-2 9-1
(England) Paula Anderson	(Egypt) S Abou El Magd	9-1 9-1 9-1
(England) Alex Cowie	(South Africa) Gillian Winkler	4-9 9-2 9-3 9-3
(England) Annette Pilling	(England) Flavia Roberts	9-1 9-3 4-9 10-9
(England) Sue Cogswell	(Scotland) Alison Cruikshank	9-3 9-3 9-0
(Scotland) Heather Wallace	(England) B Bentham	9-0 9-0 9-2
(England) Barbara Diggens	(South Africa) Kim Faclier	10-9 9-1 9-2
(England) Wendy Berry	(South Africa) S Lindsay	5-9 9-2 9-7 7-9 9-5
(Guernsey) Martine Le Moignan	(England) S Moore	9-7 9-0 9-3
(Australia) Cath Bellemore	(England) Carol Foulkes	9-5 9-3 9-3
(South Africa) Renee Auchamp	(New Zealand) Karen Lever	7-9 9-3 9-5 9-5
(England) Felicity Hargreaves	(England) Sandra Wrench	9-6 9-1 9-1
(New Zealand) Susan Devoy	(England) Nicki Spurgeon	9-7 5-9 9-1 9-2
(England) Claire Oxley	(England) Sheila White	9-2 9-0 9-1
(England) Alison Cumings	(England) Tracy Cunliffe	9-0 9-0 9-2
(England) Karen Butterworth	(Republic of Ireland) Barbara Lowans	9-5 10-9 9-0
(Guernsey) Lisa Opie	(South Africa) Debby Ashby	9-1 9-7 9-4
(England) Jayne Ashton	(England) J Wilding	9-7 9-1 9-3
(Australia) Jan Miller	(England) Suzanne Burgess	9-6 9-0 9-2
(England) Jacky Parsons	(Nigeria) T Tikil	9-1 9-5 9-0
(New Zealand) Robyn Blackwood	(South Africa) Donna Caldwell	9-7 9-7 9-4
(Republic of Ireland) Rebecca Best	(Republic of Ireland) Barbara Sanderson	9-4 9-4 9-3
(England) Ruth Strauss	(Wales) Deanna Murray	3-9 9-2 9-2 9-5
(England) Melanie Warren-Hawkes	(England) Wendy Cole	9-7 9-6 9-7
(England) Angela Smith	(England) Joyce Tuomey	9-5 9-1 9-2
(South Africa) L Houghton	(England) Jill Benfield	9-5 9-2 9-2
(Australia) Carin Clonda	(England) G Hill	9-1 9-0 9-1
(Australia) Susan Carter	(England) S Kipping	9-4 7-9 9-5 9-3
(Australia) Rhonda Thorne	(England) P Lusby	9-2 9-0 9-0
(England) Jane Freeman	(South Africa) Magriet Luchs	7-9 9-4 5-9 1-9 9-4
(Australia) Lynne Ferry	(Australia) Eryi Emmanuel	9-3 9-6 9-6
(Australia) Rae Anderson	(England) Lucy Soutter	9-7 7-9 9-3 9-5

=== Second round ===
Player one	Player two	Score
(Australia) Cardwell	(England) Anderson P	9-3 9-0 9-4
(England) Cowie	(England) Pilling	
(England) Cogswell	(Scotland) Wallace	9-2 9-1 9-3
(England) Diggens	(England) Berry	9-0 9-0 9-1
(Guernsey) Le Moignan	(Australia) Bellemore	9-1 9-0 9-4
(South Africa) Aucamp	(England) Hargreaves	9-1 9-2 9-3
(New Zealand) Devoy	(England) Oxley	9-1 9-2 9-1
(England) Cumings	(England) Butterworth	9-2 9-5 9-0
(Guernsey) Opie	(England) Ashton	9-5 9-5 9-4
(Australia) Miller	(England) Parsons	9-4 9-0 9-1
(New Zealand) Blackwood	(Republic of Ireland) Best	9-1 9-4 9-3
(England) Strauss	(England) Warren-Hawkes	9-3 9-7 9-1
(England) Smith	(South Africa) Houghton	9-2 9-1 9-4
(Australia) Clonda	(Australia) Carter	9-4 9-0 9-5
(Australia) Thorne	(England) Freeman	10-8 9-0 9-0
(Australia) Ferry	(Australia) Anderson R	9-2 9-3 9-7

=== Third round ===
Player one	Player two	Score
(Australia) Cardwell	(England) Cowie	9-0 9-0 9-0
(England) Cogswell	(England) Diggens	1-9 9-4 9-4 9-1
(Guernsey) Le Moignan	(South Africa) Aucamp	9-1 9-3 9-4
(New Zealand) Devoy	(England) Cumings	5-9 6-9 9-6 9-1 9-6
(Guernsey) Opie	(Australia) Miller	9-0 5-9 9-5 9-2
(New Zealand) Blackwood	(England) Strauss	9-6 9-1 9-5
(England) Smith	(Australia) Clonda	9-5 7-9 8-10 9-3 9-5
(Australia) Thorne	(Australia) Ferry	9-1 10-8 9-3

=== Quarter-finals ===
Player one	Player two	Score
(Australia) Cardwell	(England) Cogswell	9-1 9-3 9-2
(Guernsey) Le Moignan	(New Zealand) Devoy	9-6 9-0 3-9 9-2
(Guernsey) Opie	(New Zealand) Blackwood	9-2 9-4 9-4
(England) Smith	(Australia) Thorne	4-9 9-7 4-9 9-6 9-3

=== Semi-finals ===
Player one	Player two	Score
(Australia) Cardwell	(Guernsey) Le Moignan	9-1 9-2 9-10 9-3
(Guernsey) Opie	(England) Smith	0-9 9-5 9-6 9-7

=== Final ===
Player one	Player two	Score
(Australia) Cardwell	(Guernsey) Opie	9-10 9-6 9-4 9-5

Preceded by 1982	British Open Squash Championships; England (Derby); 1983	Succeeded by 1984
