= 1983 Women's World Team Squash Championships =

Squash event

Women's World Team 1983
- 3rd World Women's Team Championship
- Location: Perth, Australia
- Date: October 31 - November 04, 1983

Results
- Champions: Australia
- Runners-up: England
- Third place: New Zealand

The 1983 Women's World Team Squash Championships were held in Perth, Australia and took place from October 31 until November 4, 1983. The home team became champions, defeating England 2-1 in the final, where the finalists, outcome and the final score were identical to the previous edition's.

New Zealand defeated Ireland in the third place play-off.

== Results ==
=== Pool A ===
Team one	Team two	Score
Australia	(Republic of Ireland) Ireland	3-0
Australia	United States	3-0
Australia	Wales	3-0
Australia	Sweden	3-0
(Republic of Ireland) Ireland	United States	3-0
(Republic of Ireland) Ireland	Wales	2-1
(Republic of Ireland) Ireland	Sweden	3-0
United States	Wales	2-1
United States	Sweden	2-1
Wales	Sweden	3-0

Pos	Nation	Team	P	W	L	Pts
1	Australia	Rhonda Thorne, Carin Clonda, Jan Miller, Diane Davis	4	4	0	8
2	(Republic of Ireland) Ireland	Mary Byrne, Rebecca Best, Geraldine Barniville, Marjorie Burke	4	3	1	6
3	United States	Alicia McConnell, Nancy Gengler, Mary Hulbert, Gail Ramsay, Carol Weymuller	4	2	2	4
4	Wales	Deanna Murray, Sian Washer, Debbie Turnbull	4	1	3	2
5	Sweden	Agneta Samuelson, Lena Fridén, Eva Lundqvist	4	0	4	0

=== Pool B ===
Team one	Team two	Score
England	Scotland	3-0
England	New Zealand	3-0
England	Canada	3-0
New Zealand	Scotland	3-0
New Zealand	Canada	3-0
Canada	Scotland	2-1

Pos	Nation	Team	P	W	L	Pts
1	England	Martine Le Moignan, Angela Smith, Lisa Opie, Ruth Strauss, Barbara Diggens	3	3	0	6
2	New Zealand	Susan Devoy, Robyn Blackwood, Joanne Williams, Donna Gurran	3	2	1	4
3	Canada	Elaine Hinnegan, Diane Edge, Joanne Beckwith, Andrie Levey	3	1	2	2
4	Scotland	Heather Wallace, Alison Cruickshank, Anne Smith	3	0	3	0

=== Semi-finals ===
Team one	Team two	Score
Australia	New Zealand	2-1
England	(Republic of Ireland) Ireland	3-0

=== Positional Play Offs ===
Position	Team one	Team two	Score
5th place	Scotland	United States	2-1
7th place	Wales	Canada	2-1

=== Third place ===
New Zealand
3
Third place

4 November 1983

Ireland
0

			1	2	3	4	5
1	(New Zealand) (Republic of Ireland)	Susan Devoy; Mary Byrne	10; 9	9; 7	9; 4
2	(New Zealand) (Republic of Ireland)	Robyn Blackwood; Rebecca Best	9; 5	9; 1	9; 1
3	(New Zealand) (Republic of Ireland)	Joanne Williams; Marjorie Burke	10; 9	9; 5	9; 2

=== Final ===
Australia
2
Final
Perth, Australia
04 November 1983

England
1

			1	2	3	4	5
1	(Australia) (England)	Rhonda Thorne; Lisa Opie	2; 9	9; 6	5; 9	10; 8	10; 8
2	(Australia) (England)	Carin Clonda; Martine Le Moignan	9; 4	9; 5	9; 1
3	(Australia) (England)	Jan Miller; Angela Smith	6; 9	4; 9	6; 9

Preceded by England; 1981	Squash World Team; Australia; 1983	Succeeded by Ireland; 1985

== See also ==
- World Team Squash Championships
- World Squash Federation
- World Open (squash)
