= 1981 Women's World Team Squash Championships =

Squash tournament

Women's World Team 1981
- 2nd World Women's Team Championship
- Location: Canada
- Date: 25 October - 2 November 1981

Results
- Champions: Australia
- Runners-up: England
- Third place: New Zealand

The 1981 Women's W.I.S.R.F World Team Squash Championships were held in Canada, and took place from 25 October until 2 November 1981.

== Results ==
=== Group 1 ===
Date	Team One	Team Two	Score
Oct 25	England	United States	
Oct 25	Kenya	West Germany	
Oct 25	Wales	Canada	
Oct 26	England	Canada	3-0
Oct 26	United States	West Germany	2-1
Oct 26	New Zealand	Wales	3-0
Oct 27	England	Wales	3-0
Oct 27	New Zealand	West Germany	2-1
Oct 27	Canada	Kenya	3-0
Oct 28	England	West Germany	3-0
Oct 28	New Zealand	Kenya	3-0
Oct 28	Wales	United States	3-0
Oct 29	England	Kenya	3-0
Oct 29	New Zealand	United States	3-0
Oct 29	Canada	West Germany	3-0
Oct 30	United States	Kenya	
Oct 30	New Zealand	Canada	3-0
Oct 30	Wales	West Germany	
Oct 31	England	New Zealand	3-0
Oct 31	Canada	United States	
Oct 31	Wales	Kenya	

Pos	Nation	Team	P	W	L	Pts
1	England	Sue Cogswell, Angela Smith, Lisa Opie	6	6	0	12
2	New Zealand	Susan Devoy, Robyn Blackwood, Annette Owen, Joanne Milne	6	5	1	10
3	Wales	Deanna Murray, Sian Washer, Christina Rees	6	4	2	8
4	Canada	Beryl Paton, Nancy Ballantyne, Jann Taylor, Pam Davidson	6	2	4	4
5	Kenya	Fran Marshall, Chris Hood, Gail Paul	6	2	4	4
6	United States	Mariann Greenberg, Carol Weymuller, Sally Fields, Nancy Gengler, Nina Porter	6	2	5	1
7	West Germany	Claudia Thomalla, B Werner, G Baumann	6	0	6	0

=== Group 2 ===
Date	Team One	Team Two	Score
Oct 25	Australia	Zimbabwe	3-0
Oct 25	Scotland	Sweden	3-0
Oct 25	Netherlands	Nigeria	3-0
Oct 26	Australia	Scotland	3-0
Oct 26	Zimbabwe	Nigeria	3-0
Oct 26	(Republic of Ireland) Ireland	Sweden	3-0
Oct 27	Australia	Sweden	3-0
Oct 27	(Republic of Ireland) Ireland	Nigeria	3-0
Oct 27	Scotland	Netherlands	3-0
Oct 28	Australia	Nigeria	3-0
Oct 28	(Republic of Ireland) Ireland	Netherlands	3-0
Oct 28	Zimbabwe	Sweden	2-1
Oct 29	Australia	Netherlands	3-0
Oct 29	(Republic of Ireland) Ireland	Zimbabwe	3-0
Oct 29	Scotland	Nigeria	3-0
Oct 30	Scotland	(Republic of Ireland) Ireland	2–1
Oct 30			
Oct 30			
Oct 31	Australia	(Republic of Ireland) Ireland	
Oct 31			
Oct 31			

Pos	Nation	Team	P	W	L	Pts
1	Australia	Rhonda Thorne, Barbara Oldfield, Vicki Hoffman, Rae Anderson	6	6	0	12
2	Scotland	Heather Wallace, Alix Bostock, Ann Smith, Rae Lynch	6	5	1	10
3	(Republic of Ireland) Ireland	Dorothy Armstrong, Geraldine Barniville, Anne Shepherd	6	4	2	8
4	Zimbabwe		6	2	4	4
5	Sweden		6	2	4	4
6	Netherlands		6	2	5	1
7	Nigeria		6	0	6	0

=== Positional Play Offs ===
Position	Team One	Team Two	Score
3rd place	New Zealand	Scotland	3-0
5th place	(Republic of Ireland) Ireland	Wales	2-1
7th place	Canada	Zimbabwe	3-0
9th place	Sweden	Kenya	3-0
11th place	United States	Netherlands	2-1
13th place	West Germany	Nigeria	3-0

=== Final ===
Australia
2
FINAL
Toronto, Canada
02 November 1981

England
1

			1	2	3	4	5
1	(Australia) (England)	Rhonda Thorne; Angela Smith	9; 1	9; 6	9; 0
2	(Australia) (England)	Vicki Hoffman; Lisa Opie	9; 5	9; 7	9; 6
3	(Australia) (England)	Barbara Oldfield; Sue Cogswell	8; 10	9; 3	9; 4	7; 9	9; 10

Preceded by England; 1979	Squash World Team; Canada; 1981	Succeeded by Australia; 1983

== See also ==
- World Team Squash Championships
- World Squash Federation
- World Open (squash)
