= Clifton Hall Girls' Grammar School =

Grammar school in Nottingham, England

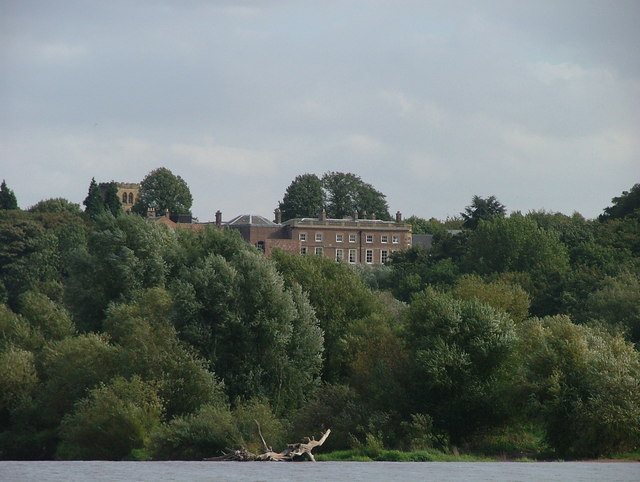

Location
- Clifton, Nottingham, Nottinghamshire; England; 52°54′30″N 1°11′53″W

Information
- Type: Grammar school
- Established: 1958
- Closed: 1976
- Local authority: Nottinghamshire
- Gender: Girls
- Age: 11 to 18

Clifton Hall Girls' Grammar School was a girls grammar school at Clifton Hall, in Clifton, Nottingham.

== History ==
Clifton Hall, which has been around since the 11th century, became the property of the Clifton family in the 13th century. The family, having settled in the area in the 11th century and named after the local village, gained prominence when Gervase de Clifton purchased the Manor of Clifton and Manor of Wilford in Nottingham towards the end of the 13th century, making them Lords of the Manor.

There were two buildings: the old Clifton Hall and a new building further up in the grounds, this latter housed the school's Science dapartment, Art rooms and Assembly Hall. Clifton Hall had some great rooms, for example the well-known, "Red Room" (whose ceiling featured the Clifton family's many coats of arms) and was reputed to be haunted; a reputation, perhaps, deriving from the intense, almost claustrophobic depth of vermillion paint used in this room. The head teacher at the school when it first opened was Miss Heron; she died of cancer around 1970. She was succeeded by Miss Squire.

On 13 January 1970, sixth-former 17-year-old Sandra Simpkin married 22-year-old Alan Barnes, a window cleaner, at a register office. She was given a day off lessons to attend the ceremony. Marriages such as sixth-formers at school were and still are rare.

=== Closure ===
When the school finally closed in July 1976, a large model of a Phoenix – (the school's emblem) – was burnt to signify the end of the school. The uniform was all purple, skirt, blazer, purple/yellow tie and a white blouse. On closing, the buildings became part of Nottingham Trent University. In 2004 they were up for sale for £500,000.

Nearby to the school is a cliff that overlooks the River Trent. It is said that a lady of the Clifton family jumped off the cliff and died when she was jilted by her lover.

== Notable alumni ==
- Lesley Hardy, pilot, from 'The Downs' in Wilford, with 26 year old Caroline Frost, on 31 October 1977, aged 24, she piloted British United Air Ferries 'G-BDFE' Handley Page Dart Herald, from Southend to Düsseldorf Airport, becoming the UK's first airliner flown by an all-female crew; the US would have its first all-female crew on 30 December 1977 with Lynn Rippelmeyer and Emilie Jones later on 27 June 1988, in a British Island Airways BAC 1-11, Caroline Frost hit a flock of birds on take off from Newcastle Airport, and was forced to make an emergency landing
- Angela Littlewood, shotputter, in the Commonwealth Games in Canada in 1978, and Brisbane in 1982, and the Olympic Games in Moscow in 1980; in the Olympic final she threw 17.53 metres, a British record, but the Eastern European women were throwing 21 metres
- Jayne Torvill, ice-skater

== Former teachers ==
- Lesley Moore (squash player), originally from Runcorn, attending, Helsby Girls' Grammar School, she left the school in 1975, and also played hockey for England, and reached the quarter-finals of the 1980 Women's British Open Squash Championship, being part of the British team that won the 1979 Women's World Team Squash Championships, and reached the third round of the 1981 Women's World Open Squash Championship
