= 1979 Women's World Team Squash Championships =

Squash event

Women's World Team 1979
- 1st World Women's Team Championship
- Location: Birmingham, England
- Date: 15–20 March 1979

Results
- Champions: (United Kingdom) Great Britain
- Runners-up: Australia
- Third place: (Republic of Ireland) Ireland

The 1979 Women's World Team Squash Championships were held in England and took place from 15 to March 20, 1979.

Great Britain won the championships.

== Results ==
=== Round Robin ===
Team One	Team Two	Score
Australia	Sweden	3-0
(United Kingdom) Great Britain	Canada	3-0
Sweden	United States	2-1
Australia	(Republic of Ireland) Ireland	3-0
(United Kingdom) Great Britain	(Republic of Ireland) Ireland	3-0
(United Kingdom) Great Britain	Australia	3-0
(United Kingdom) Great Britain	United States	3-0
Australia	Canada	3-0
(Republic of Ireland) Ireland	Sweden	3-0
(Republic of Ireland) Ireland	United States	3-0
Canada	Sweden	2-1
Canada	United States	3-0
(United Kingdom) Great Britain	Sweden	
Australia	United States	
(Republic of Ireland) Ireland	Canada	

Pos	Nation	Team	P	W	L	Pts
1	(United Kingdom) Great Britain	Sue Cogswell, Angela Smith, Teresa Lawes, Barbara Diggens, Jayne Ashton, Lesley Moore	5	5	0	10
2	Australia	Barbara Wall, Vicki Hoffman, Sue King, Rhonda Thorne, Anne Smith	5	4	1	8
3	(Republic of Ireland) Ireland	Geraldine Barniville, Dorothy Armstrong, Barbara Sanderson, Irene Hewitt	5	3	2	6
4	Canada	Shelagh Murray, Elaine Hinnegan, Ann Thompson, Penny Glover, Kay Widmer, Sue Pexman, Barbara Savage	5	2	3	4
5	Sweden	Katarina Due-Boje, Tina Dahl, Agneta Samuelson, Eva Lundqvist	5	1	4	2
6	United States	Mariann Greenberg, Carol Weymuller, Ginny Akabane, Barbara Maltby, Diana Nyad	5	0	5	0

=== Final ===
Great Britain
3
FINAL
Edgbaston Priory, Birmingham, England
20 March 1979

Australia
0

			1	2	3	4	5
1	(United Kingdom) (Australia)	Sue Cogswell; Barbara Wall	9; 6	9; 3	9; 1
2	(United Kingdom) (Australia)	Angela Smith; Vicki Hoffman	9; 7	7; 9	9; 3	9; 5
3	(United Kingdom) (Australia)	Teresa Lawes; Sue King	5; 9	9; 5	7; 9	9; 7	9; 5

== See also ==
- World Team Squash Championships
- World Squash Federation
- World Open (squash)

Preceded by None	Squash World Team; England; 1979	Succeeded by Canada; 1981
