= England national squash team =

England national squash team may refer to:

- England men's national squash team
- England women's national squash team
