= 1978 European Squash Team Championships =

Squash tournament

- 6th
- Location: (Netherlands) Amsterdam
- Venue: Amsterdam Squash Club
- Date: 15 – 19 March 1978
- Website europeansquash.com

Results
- Champions: Men England; Women England

The 1978 European Squash Team Championships, sponsored by Dunlop, was the 6th edition of European Squash Team Championships for squash players. The event was held at the Amsterdam Squash Club in Amsterdam, Netherlands, from 15 to 19 March 1978 and the first women's edition was introduced. The tournament was organised by the European Squash Rackets Federation (ESRF).

The England men's team won their 6th consecutive title and the England women's team won their 1st title.

== Men's tournament ==
=== Group stage ===
Pool A

Pos	Team	P	W	L	Pts
1	England	3	3	0	6
2	Belgium	3	2	1	4
3	Switzerland	3	1	2	2
4	Luxembourg	3	0	3	0

Pool B

Pos	Team	P	W	L	Pts
1	Sweden	3	3	0	6
2	Netherlands	3	2	1	4
3	Denmark	3	1	2	2
4	Italy	3	0	3	0

Pool C

Pos	Team	P	W	L	Pts
1	Scotland	2	2	0	4
2	Wales	2	1	1	2
3	France	2	0	2	0

Pool D

Pos	Team	P	W	L	Pts
1	Finland	3	3	0	6
2	(Republic of Ireland) Ireland	3	2	1	4
3	Germany	3	1	2	2
4	Greece	3	0	3	0

=== Semi finals ===
England
5
Semi-final 1

Finland
0

			1	2	3	4	5
1	(England) (Finland)	Jonathan Leslie; Kale Leskinen	9; 1	9; 3	9; 2
2	(England) (Finland)	Ian Robinson; Harry Bucht	9; 2	9; 2	9; 3
3	(England) (Finland)	Phil Kenyon; Henry Bucht	9; 4	9; 7	9; 4
4	(England) (Finland)	Gawain Briars; Poku Salo	9; 2	9; 0	9; 2
5	(England) (Finland)	John Le Lievre; Jukka Serimaa	9; 2	9; 1	10; 8

Sweden
5
Semi-final 2

Scotland
0

			1	2	3	4	5
1	(Sweden) (Scotland)	Lars Kvant; Kim Bruce-Lockhart	9; 5	4; 9	9; 2	9; 0
2	(Sweden) (Scotland)	Bo Boström; Neil Stewart	9; 6	9; 7	9; 6
3	(Sweden) (Scotland)	Leif Leiner; Chris Wilson	3; 9	2; 9	9; 5	9; 0	9; 4
4	(Sweden) (Scotland)	Johan Stockenberg; Duncan McArthur	9; 7	6; 9	9; 5	9; 6
5	(Sweden) (Scotland)	Mikael Hellström; Robin Chalmers	9; 0	9; 0	9; 7

=== Third place ===
Scotland
5
Third place

Finland
0

			1	2	3	4	5
1	(Scotland) (Finland)	Robin Chalmers; Poku Salo	6; 9	10; 9	9; 2	6; 9	9; 6
2	(Scotland) (Finland)	Duncan McArthur; Henri Bucht	6; 9	9; 6	9; 6	9; 5
3	(Scotland) (Finland)	Neil Stewart; Roger Jones	7; 9	10; 9	0; 9	9; 6	9; 2
4	(Scotland) (Finland)	Chris Wilson; Harri Bucht	9; 2	9; 0	9; 2
5	(Scotland) (Finland)	Kim Bruce-Lockhart; Kale Leskinen	9; 1	9; 4	9; 1

=== Final ===
England
4
Final

Sweden
1

			1	2	3	4	5
1	(England) (Sweden)	Jonathan Leslie; Lars Kvant	9; 4	4; 9	9; 10	9; 10
2	(England) (Sweden)	Ian Robinson; Bo Boström	9; 1	9; 8	9; 0
3	(England) (Sweden)	Phil Kenyon; Leif Leiner	9; 6	9; 1	9; 0
4	(England) (Sweden)	Gawain Briars; Johan Stockenberg	9; 6	9; 0	9; 3
5	(England) (Sweden)	John Le Lievre; Mikael Hellström	10; 8	9; 5	9; 1

== Women's tournament ==
=== Group stage ===
Pool A

Pos	Team	P	W	L	Pts
1	England	4	4	0	8
2	Wales	4	3	1	6
3	Sweden	4	2	2	4
4	Germany	4	1	3	2
5	Belgium	4	0	4	0

Pool B

Pos	Team	P	W	L	Pts
1	(Republic of Ireland) Ireland	4	4	0	8
2	Scotland	4	3	1	6
3	Netherlands	4	2	2	4
4	Switzerland	4	1	3	2
5	Denmark	4	0	4	0

=== Third place ===
Scotland
3
Third place

Wales
0

		1	2	3	4	5
1	(Scotland) (Wales)	9	9	9
2	(Scotland) (Wales)	9	9	9
3	(Scotland) (Wales)	9	9	9

=== Final ===
England
3
Final

Ireland
0

			1	2	3	4	5
1	(England) (Republic of Ireland)	Teresa Lawes; Geraldine Barniville	9; 3	6; 9	5; 9	9; 1	9; 0
2	(England) (Republic of Ireland)	Lesley Moore; Dorothy Armstrong	9; 0	9; 0	9; 0
3	(England) (Republic of Ireland)	Averil Morris; Barbara Sanderson	10; 8	7; 9	9; 3	9; 2
