= 1979 European Squash Team Championships =

Squash tournament

- 7th
- Location: (West Germany) Hamburg
- Date: 15 – 18 February 1979
- Website europeansquash.com

Results
- Champions: Men England; Women England

The 1979 European Squash Team Championships was the 7th edition of European Squash Team Championships for squash players. The event was held in Hamburg, West Germany, from 15 to 18 February 1979. The tournament was organised by the European Squash Rackets Federation (ESRF).

The England men's team won their 7th consecutive title and the England women's team won their 2nd title.

Scotland took third place in both events.

== Men's tournament ==
=== Group stage ===
Pool A

Pos	Team	P	W	L	Pts
1	England	4	4	0	8
2	Germany	4	3	1	6
3	Belgium	4	2	2	4
4	Norway	4	1	3	2
5	Austria	4	0	4	0

Pool B

Pos	Team	P	W	L	Pts
1	Scotland	4	4	0	8
2	Netherlands	4	3	1	6
3	France	4	2	2	4
4	Italy	4	1	3	2
5	Spain	4	0	4	0

Pool C

Pos	Team	P	W	L	Pts
1	(Republic of Ireland) Ireland	3	3	0	6
2	Finland	3	2	1	4
3	Switzerland	3	1	2	2
4	Greece	3	0	3	0

Pool D

Pos	Team	P	W	L	Pts
1	Sweden	4	4	0	8
2	Wales	4	3	1	6
3	Denmark	4	2	2	4
4	Monaco	4	1	3	2
5	Luxembourg	4	0	4	0

=== Semi finals ===
Team 1	Team 2	Score
England	(Republic of Ireland) Ireland	5-0
Sweden	Scotland	3-2

=== Third place ===
Scotland
4
Third place

Ireland
1

			1	2	3	4	5
1	(Scotland) (Republic of Ireland)	Neil Stewart; David Gotto	9; 4	9; 6	9; 4
2	(Scotland) (Republic of Ireland)	Kim Bruce-Lockhart; Ben Cranwell	10; 8	9; 0	9; 0
3	(Scotland) (Republic of Ireland)	Chris Wilson; Bernard O'Gorman	9; 5	9; 4	5; 9	9; 5
4	(Scotland) (Republic of Ireland)	Duncan McArthur; Jack Laffan	9; 0	1; 9	1; 9	9; 2	9; 7
5	(Scotland) (Republic of Ireland)	Gordon Blair; Gar Holohan	9; 3	9; 7	5; 9	5; 9	9; 1

=== Final ===
England
5
Final

Sweden
0

			1	2	3	4	5
1	(England) (Sweden)	Phil Kenyon; Mikael Hellström	5; 9	9; 2	9; 2	5; 9	9; 3
2	(England) (Sweden)	Gawain Briars; Johan Stockenberg	7; 9	9; 1	6; 9	9; 2	9; 2
3	(England) (Sweden)	Peter Verow; Bo Boström	10; 8	9; 4	9; 6
4	(England) (Sweden)	Andrew Dwyer; Peter Boström	9; 3	9; 0	9; 5
5	(England) (Sweden)	Ian Robinson; Stefan Winström	9; 3	7; 9	9; 2	8; 10	9; 6

== Women's tournament ==
=== Group stage ===
Pool A

Pos	Team	P	W	L	Pts
1	(Republic of Ireland) Ireland	5	5	0	10
2	Scotland	5	4	1	8
3	Finland	5	3	2	6
4	Germany	5	2	3	4
5	Netherlands	5	1	4	2
6	Belgium	5	0	5	0

Pool B

Pos	Team	P	W	L	Pts
1	England	4	4	0	8
2	Wales	4	3	1	6
3	Sweden	4	2	2	4
4	Switzerland	4	1	3	2
5	Denmark	4	0	4	0

=== Third place ===
Scotland
3
Third place

Wales
0

			1	2	3	4	5
1	(Scotland) (Wales)	Alex Bostock; Christina Rees	3; 9	9; 4	9; 1	9; 2
2	(Scotland) (Wales)	Dorothy Sharp; Barbara Davies	4; 9	9; 2	9; 1	9; 0
3	(Scotland) (Wales)	Liz Elgood; Jill Griffiths	9; 2	9; 2	9; 5

=== Final ===
England
3
Final

Ireland
0

			1	2	3	4	5
1	(England) (Republic of Ireland)	Teresa Lawes; Geraldine Barniville	9; 4	9; 3	9; 4
2	(England) (Republic of Ireland)	Lesley Moore; Dorothy Armstrong	9; 4	9; 6	9; 7
3	(England) (Republic of Ireland)	Averil Morris; Barbara Sanderson	9; 4	9; 5	9; 4
