= Lesley Moore (squash player) =

English squash player

Personal information
- Born: Q2.1951 Runcorn, England

Sport
- Country: England
Medal record
Representing Great Britain
Women's squash
World Team Squash Championships
Gold medal – first place	1979 Birmingham	Team
Representing England
European Team Championships
Gold medal – first place	1978 Amsterdam	Team
Gold medal – first place	1979 Hamburg	Team
Gold medal – first place	1980 Helsinki	Team

Lesley Moore (born Q2.1951) is a former English professional squash player. She helped Great Britain become world team champions and also represented England at field hockey.

== Biography ==
Moore was born in Runcorn and educated at Helsby Grammar School. In squash, she represented Nottinghamshire at county level and played league squash for Nottingham Squash Club.

In 1974, she was a physical education teacher at Clifton Hall Girls' Grammar School and had also played field hockey for England at U23 level. The same year she received a call up for the full England team for a tour of Canada. After the tour she took up a position at Bellerive FCJ Catholic College.

In 1975, she gave up teaching and hockey to concentrate on squash. She subsequently lived in New Zealand and Australia for a short time before returning to Runcorn and then Birmingham and playing for Edgbaston Priory.

Moore helped Great Britain become world champions at the 1979 Women's World Team Squash Championships in Birmingham. The other team members consisted of Sue Cogswell, Angela Smith, Teresa Lawes, Barbara Diggens and Jayne Ashton. She reached the ranking of No.3 in the British rankings later that year and No.2 by the end of 1980.

Moore also won three gold medals for the England women's national squash team at the European Squash Team Championships during the 1978 European Squash Team Championships, 1979 European Squash Team Championships and 1980 European Squash Team Championships.
