= 1983 European Squash Team Championships =

Squash tournament

- 11th
- Location: (West Germany) Munich
- Date: 20 – 22 May 1983
- Website europeansquash.com

Results
- Champions: Men Sweden; Women England

The 1983 European Squash Team Championships was the 11th edition of European Squash Team Championships for squash players. The event was held in Munich, West Germany, from 20 to 22 May 1983. The tournament was organised by the European Squash Rackets Federation (ESRF).

The Sweden men's team won their 2nd title and the England women's team won their 6th title.

Wales achieved their best result to date with two bronze medals.

== Men's tournament ==
=== First Round ===
Team 1	Team 2	Score
Spain	Italy	4-1
France	Norway	5-0
Monaco	Austria	3-2

=== Second Round ===
Team 1	Team 2	Score
England	France	5-0
Germany	Denmark	4-1
Finland	Luxembourg	5-0
Wales	Switzerland	5-0
Scotland	Belgium	5-0
(Republic of Ireland) Ireland	Monaco	5-0
Netherlands	Greece	3-2
Sweden	Spain	5-0

=== Quarter finals ===
Team 1	Team 2	Score
England	Germany	5-0
Wales	Finland	3-2
Netherlands	(Republic of Ireland) Ireland	3-2
Sweden	Scotland	5-0

=== Semi finals ===
Team 1	Team 2	Score
England	Wales	5-0
Sweden	Netherlands	5-0

=== Third place ===
Wales
5
Final

Netherlands
0

			1	2	3	4	5
1	(Wales) (Netherlands)	Cerryg Jones
2	(Wales) (Netherlands)	Jonathan Evans / David Frazer
3	(Wales) (Netherlands)	Adrian Davies
4	(Wales) (Netherlands)	Hugh Evans
5	(Wales) (Netherlands)	Teifion Salisbury

=== Final ===
Sweden
3
Final

England
2

			1	2	3	4	5
1	(Sweden) (England)	Lars Kvant; Gawain Briars	9; 6	10; 8	3; 9	6; 9	9; 5
2	(Sweden) (England)	Jan-Ulf Soderberg; Ashley Naylor	3; 1
3	(Sweden) (England)	Björn Almström; Geoff Williams	0; 3
4	(Sweden) (England)	Fredrik Johnson; Peter Verow	3; 1
5	(Sweden) (England)	Jonas Görnerup; Christy Willstrop	0; 3

== Women's tournament ==
=== First Round ===
Team 1	Team 2	Score
Spain	Austria	3-0

=== Second Round ===
Team 1	Team 2	Score
Germany	France	3-0
England	Spain	3-0
Scotland	Monaco	3-0
Finland	Belgium	3-0
Wales	Norway	3-0
(Republic of Ireland) Ireland	Luxembourg	3-0
Netherlands	Switzerland	2-1
Sweden	Italy	3-0

=== Quarter finals ===
Team 1	Team 2	Score
England	Germany	3-0
Scotland	Sweden	2-1
(Republic of Ireland) Ireland	Finland	3-0
Wales	Netherlands	3-0

=== Semi-finals ===
Team 1	Team 2	Score
England	Wales	3-0
(Republic of Ireland) Ireland	Scotland	2-1

=== Third place ===
Wales
2
Final

Scotland
1

			1	2	3	4	5
1	(Wales) (Scotland)	Deanna Murphy; Heather Wallace
2	(Wales) (Scotland)	Debbie Turnbull; Shirley Brown
3	(Wales) (Scotland)	Sharon Stevenson; Angela Smith / Liz Elgood

=== Final ===
England
3
Final

Ireland
0

			1	2	3	4	5
1	(England) (Republic of Ireland)	Martine Le Moignan; Marjorie Burke	3; 0
2	(England) (Republic of Ireland)	Barbara Diggens; Geraldine Barniville	3; 0
3	(England) (Republic of Ireland)	Ruth Strauss; Rebecca Best	3; 0
