= 1981 European Squash Team Championships =

Squash tournament

- 9th
- Location: (Netherlands) Amsterdam
- Date: 19 – 21 March 1981
- Website europeansquash.com

Results
- Champions: Men England; Women England

The 1981 European Squash Team Championships was the 9th edition of European Squash Team Championships for squash players. The event was held in Amsterdam, Netherlands, from 19 to 21 March 1981. The tournament was organised by the European Squash Rackets Federation (ESRF).

The England men's team regained the title from Sweden, winning for the 8th time. The England women's team won their 4th title.

Ireland took bronze in the men's event.

== Men's tournament ==
=== Group stage ===
Pool A

Pos	Team	P	W	L	Pts
1	Sweden	4	4	0	8
2	Germany	4	3	1	6
3	Belgium	4	2	2	4
4	Austria	4	1	3	2
5	Spain	4	0	4	0

Pool B

Pos	Team	P	W	L	Pts
1	England	4	4	0	8
2	Netherlands	4	3	1	6
3	Monaco	4	2	2	4
4	Denmark	4	1	3	2
5	Italy	4	0	4	0

Pool C

Pos	Team	P	W	L	Pts
1	Scotland	4	4	0	8
2	Finland	4	3	1	6
3	France	4	2	2	4
4	Greece	4	1	3	2
5	Norway	4	0	4	0

Pool D

Pos	Team	P	W	L	Pts
1	(Republic of Ireland) Ireland	3	3	0	6
2	Wales	3	2	1	4
3	Switzerland	3	1	2	2
4	Luxembourg	3	0	3	0

=== Semi finals ===
Team 1	Team 2	Score
England	Scotland	5-0
Sweden	(Republic of Ireland) Ireland	4-1

=== Third place ===
Ireland
3

Scotland
2

			1	2	3	4	5
1	(Republic of Ireland) (Scotland)	Ger Holahan; Gordon Blair
2	(Republic of Ireland) (Scotland)	John Young; Duncan McArthur
3	(Republic of Ireland) (Scotland)	Jonah Barrington; Neil Steward
4	(Republic of Ireland) (Scotland)	Ben Cranwell; Stevenson
5	(Republic of Ireland) (Scotland)	David Gotto; Chris Wilson

=== Final ===
England
3
Final

Sweden
2

			1	2	3	4	5
1	(England) (Sweden)	Andrew Dwyer; Lars Kvant
2	(England) (Sweden)	David Thomas; Mikael Hellström
3	(England) (Sweden)	[[]] Bo Boström
4	(England) (Sweden)	[[]] Peter Boström
5	(England) (Sweden)	[[]] Stefan Winström

== Women's tournament ==
=== Group stage ===
Pool A

Pos	Team	P	W	L	Pts
1	England	2	2	0	4
2	Germany	2	1	1	2
3	Switzerland	2	0	2	0

Pool B

Pos	Team	P	W	L	Pts
1	(Republic of Ireland) Ireland	3	3	0	6
2	Netherlands	3	2	1	4
3	Denmark	3	1	2	2
4	Luxembourg	3	0	3	0

Pool C

Pos	Team	P	W	L	Pts
1	Scotland	2	2	0	4
2	Finland	2	1	1	2
3	Belgium	2	0	2	0

Pool D

Pos	Team	P	W	L	Pts
1	Wales	3	2	0	6
2	Sweden	3	2	1	4
3	France	3	1	2	2
4	Austria	3	0	3	0

=== Semi-finals ===
Team 1	Team 2	Score
England	Wales	3-0
(Republic of Ireland) Ireland	Scotland	2-1

=== Third place ===
Wales
2

Scotland
1

			1	2	3	4	5
1	(Wales) (Scotland)	? Rae Gregg
2	(Wales) (Scotland)	? Alex Bostock
3	(Wales) (Scotland)	? Angela Smith

=== Final ===
England
3
Final

Ireland
0

			1	2	3	4	5
1	(England) (Republic of Ireland)	Martine Le Moignan; Dorothy Armstrong	9; 1	9; 0	9; 2
2	(England) (Republic of Ireland)	Lisa Opie; Irene Hewitt	9; 5	9; 0	9; 3
3	(England) (Republic of Ireland)	Barbara Diggens; Geraldine Barniville	4; 9	9; 4	9; 1	9; 2
