= Marion Jackman =

Australian squash player

Sport
- Turned pro: 1975

Women's Singles
- World Open: RU (1976)
Medal record
Women's squash
Representing Australia
World Championships
Silver medal – second place	1976 Brisbane	Singles
- Updated on 20 December 2011

Marion Jackman (née Hawcroft) is an Australian retired squash player.

Jackman began playing squash in 1962 and, having retired temporarily several times, finally stopped playing in 2003.

In the early years of her career, Jackman played in tournaments within Australia. She traveled the world for a year to compete in tournaments in 1975, during which she finished runner-up at the British Open (the effective world championship of the sport at the time), losing in the final to her compatriot Heather McKay. In 1976, Jackman turned professional at the age of 34. That year, an unofficial world championship event known as the Women's World Squash Championship was inaugurated. It was held in Brisbane, and Jackman was seeded No. 3 behind McKay and Sue Newman, another Australian. She defeated Newman in the semi-finals, before losing to McKay in the final.

Jackman won the Australian Championship in 1974, and also captured 11 consecutive Queensland state titles from 1964 to 1974. As a senior player in 1980, she won the inaugural Australian over-35 title.

Jackman was awarded the Australian Sports Medal in 2000, and inducted into the Queensland Squash Hall of Fame in 2006.
