= Barbara D. Savage =

American author and historian

Barbara Dianne Savage
- Born: 1953 (age 72–73)
- Occupations: author, professor, historian

Academic background
- Education: University of Virginia (BA); Georgetown University Law Center (JD); Yale University (PhD)

Academic work
- Discipline: 20th century African American history, American religious and social reform movements, media and politics, black women's political and intellectual history
- Institutions: University of Pennsylvania

Barbara Dianne Savage (born 1953) is an American author, historian, and the Geraldine R. Segal Professor of American Social Thought and Professor of Africana Studies at the University of Pennsylvania. She teaches undergraduate and graduate and courses that focus on 20th century African American history, the history of American religious and social reform movements, the history of the relationship between media and politics and black women's political and intellectual history.

Savage graduated from the University of Virginia and the Georgetown University Law Center. She holds a Ph.D. in history from Yale University. Before entering graduate school, Savage worked in Washington, D.C., as a Congressional staff member and as a member of the staff of the Children's Defense Fund. During graduate school, she served as Director of Federal Relations, Office of the General Counsel at Yale University.

In 2017, Savage was appointed the Harmsworth Visiting professor of American History (established 1922) at the University of Oxford.

== Works ==
- Broadcasting Freedom: Radio, War, and the Politics of Race, 1938-1948 (University of North Carolina Press, 1999)
- ed. Women and Religion in the African Diaspora with R. Marie Griffith (Johns Hopkins University Press, 2006)
- Your Spirits Walk Beside Us: The Politics of Black Religion (Harvard University Press, 2008)
- Merze Tate: The Global Odyssey of a Black Woman Scholar (Yale University Press, 2023)
