= England women's national squash team =

England
- Coach: Stuart Crawford
- Association: England Squash & Racketball

World Team Championships
- First year: 1979
- Titles: 8
- Runners-up: 11
- Best finish: 1st

European Team Championships
- Titles: 44
- Runners-up: 2
- Best finish: 1st

The England women's national squash team represents England in international squash team competitions, and is governed by England Squash.

Since 1979, England has won eight World Squash Team Open titles, although the 1979 team which consisted entirely of English players competed as Great Britain. Their most recent title came in 2014. Additionally, the team has won the European Squash Team Championships on 43 occasions.

Stuart Crawford took over as coach from David Campion in 2024.

== Results ==
=== World Team Squash Championships ===
Year	Result	Position	W	L	Teams
(England) Birmingham 1979	Final	1st	6	0	Jayne Ashton, Sue Cogswell, Barbara Diggens, Teresa Lawes, Lesley Moore, Angela Smith
(Canada) Toronto 1981	Final	2nd	6	1	Sue Cogswell, Lisa Opie, Angela Smith
(Australia) Perth 1983	Final	2nd	4	1	Barbara Diggens, Martine Le Moignan, Lisa Opie, Angela Smith, Ruth Strauss
(Republic of Ireland) Dublin 1985	Champions	1st	8	0	Alison Cumings, Martine Le Moignan, Lisa Opie, Lucy Soutter
(New Zealand) Auckland 1987	Champions	1st	8	0	Alison Cumings, Martine Le Moignan, Lisa Opie, Lucy Soutter
(Netherlands) Warmond 1989	Champions	1st	6	0	Alison Cumings, Suzanne Horner, Martine Le Moignan, Lisa Opie,
(Australia) Sydney 1990	Champions	1st	5	0	Suzanne Horner, Martine Le Moignan, Lisa Opie, Lucy Soutter
(Canada) Vancouver 1992	Semi Final	3rd	5	1	Cassie Jackman, Martine Le Moignan, Lisa Opie, Sue Wright
Guernsey 1994	Final	2nd	4	1	Suzanne Horner, Cassie Jackman, Martine Le Moignan, Sue Wright
(Malaysia) Petaling Jaya 1996	Final	2nd	5	1	Linda Charman, Fiona Geaves, Suzanne Horner, Cassie Jackman
(Germany) Stuttgart 1998	Final	2nd	5	1	Suzanne Horner, Linda Charman, Jane Martin, Sue Wright
(England) Sheffield 2000	Champions	1st	7	0	Tania Bailey, Stephanie Brind, Linda Charman, Rebecca Macree
(Denmark) Odense 2002	Final	2nd	5	1	Tania Bailey, Stephanie Brind, Linda Charman, Fiona Geaves
(Netherlands) Amsterdam 2004	Final	2nd	6	1	Jenny Duncalf, Linda Elriani, Fiona Geaves, Cassie Jackman
(Canada) Edmonton 2006	Champions	1st	6	0	Tania Bailey, Vicky Botwright, Jenny Duncalf, Alison Waters
(Egypt) Cairo 2008	Final	2nd	6	1	Tania Bailey, Jenny Duncalf, Laura Lengthorn-Massaro, Alison Waters
(New Zealand) Palmerston North 2010	Final	2nd	5	1	Tania Bailey, Jenny Duncalf,Sarah Kippax, Laura Massaro
(France) Nîmes 2012	Final	2nd	5	1	Jenny Duncalf, Sarah Kippax, Laura Massaro, Alison Waters
(Canada) Niagara-on-the-Lake 2014	Champions	1st	7	0	Emma Beddoes, Laura Massaro, Sarah-Jane Perry, Alison Waters
(France) Issy-les-Moulineaux 2016	Final	2nd	5	1	Victoria Lust, Laura Massaro, Sarah-Jane Perry, Alison Waters
(China) Dalian 2018	Final	2nd	5	1	Victoria Lust, Laura Massaro, Sarah-Jane Perry, Alison Waters
(Egypt) Cairo 2022	Semi Final	3rd	3	2	Julianne Courtice, Jasmine Hutton, Sarah-Jane Perry, Lucy Turmel
Hong Kong 2024	Quarter Final	5th	3	1	Lucy Beecroft, Jasmine Hutton, Sarah-Jane Perry, Lucy Turmel

=== European Team Squash Championships ===
Year	Result	Team	Ref
1978	Gold medal	Teresa Lawes, Lesley Moore, Averil Morris	
1979	Gold medal	Teresa Lawes, Lesley Moore, Averil Morris	
1980	Gold medal	Barbara Diggens, Lesley Moore	
1981	Gold medal	Barbara Diggens, Martine Le Moignan, Lisa Opie	
1982	Gold medal	Barbara Diggens, Martine Le Moignan, Lisa Opie, Ruth Strauss	
1983	Gold medal	Barbara Diggens, Martine Le Moignan, Ruth Strauss	
1984	Gold medal	Alison Cumings, Angela Smith, Nicky Spurgeon	
1985	Gold medal	Alexandra Cowie, Alison Cumings, Nicky Spurgeon, Lucy Soutter	
1986	Gold medal	Alison Cumings, Martine Le Moignan, Lucy Soutter, Ruth Strauss	
1987	Gold medal	Suzanne Burgess, Martine Le Moignan, Lisa Opie	
1988	Gold medal	Alison Cumings, Martine Le Moignan, Lisa Opie, Melanie Warren-Hawkes	
1989	Gold medal	Alison Cumings, Suzanne Horner, Martine Le Moignan, Lucy Soutter	
1990	Gold medal	Cassie Jackman, Susan Langley, Donna Vardy, Sue Wright	
1991	Gold medal	Cassie Jackman, Martine Le Moignan, Lucy Soutter	
1992	Gold medal	Fiona Geaves,Cassie Jackman, Martine Le Moignan, Sue Wright	
1993	Gold medal	Cassie Jackman, Suzanne Horner, Sue Wright	
1994	Gold medal	Fiona Geaves, Cassie Jackman, Suzanne Horner	
1995	Gold medal	Fiona Geaves, Cassie Jackman, Sue Wright	
1996	Gold medal	Fiona Geaves, Suzanne Horner, Cassie Jackman, Jane Martin	
1997	Gold medal	Linda Charman, Fiona Geaves, Jane Martin, Sue Wright	
1998	Gold medal	Linda Charman, Cassie Jackman, Jane Martin, Sue Wright	
1999	Gold medal	Tania Bailey, Stephanie Brind, Suzanne Horner, Cassie Jackman	
2000	Gold medal	Tania Bailey, Stephanie Brind, Cassie Campion, Linda Charman	
2001	Gold medal	Tania Bailey, Linda Charman-Smith, Fiona Geaves	
2002	Gold medal	Stephanie Brind, Cassie Campion, Linda Charman-Smith, Fiona Geaves	
2003	Gold medal	Linda Charman, Cassie Jackman, Rebecca Macree, Jenny Tranfield	
2004	Gold medal	Vicky Botwright, Linda Charman, Jennifer Duncalf, Cassie Jackman	
2005	Gold medal	Vicky Botwright, Jennifer Duncalf, Linda Elriani, Alison Waters	
2006	Gold medal	Tania Bailey, Vicky Botwright, Jennifer Duncalf, Linda Elriani	
2007	Gold medal	Tania Bailey, Vicky Botwright, Jennifer Duncalf, Laura Lengthorn, Alison Waters	
2008	Gold medal	Vicky Botwright, Jennifer Duncalf, Laura Massaro, Alison Waters	
2009	Gold medal	Tania Bailey, Jennifer Duncalf, Laura Massaro, Alison Waters	
2010	Bronze medal	Tania Bailey, Jennifer Duncalf, Sarah Kippax, Dominique Lloyd-Walter	
2011	Gold medal	Emma Beddoes, Jennifer Duncalf, Sarah Kippax, Dominique Lloyd-Walter	
2012	Gold medal	Jennifer Duncalf, Sarah Kippax, Laura Massaro, Alison Waters	
2013	Gold medal	Jennifer Duncalf, Laura Massaro, Sarah-Jane Perry, Alison Waters	
2014	Gold medal	Emma Beddoes, Laura Massaro, Sarah-Jane Perry, Alison Waters	
2015	Gold medal	Emma Beddoes, Jennifer Duncalf, Victoria Lust, Sarah-Jane Perry, Alison Waters	
2016	Gold medal	Victoria Lust, Laura Massaro, Sarah-Jane Perry, Alison Waters	
2017	Gold medal	Victoria Lust, Fiona Moverley, Sarah-Jane Perry, Alison Waters	
2018	Gold medal	Victoria Lust, Laura Massaro, Sarah-Jane Perry, Alison Waters	
2019	Silver medal	Victoria Lust, Laura Massaro, Sarah-Jane Perry, Millie Tomlinson	
2022	Gold medal	Jasmine Hutton, Gina Kennedy, Sarah-Jane Perry, Lucy Turmel	
2023	Gold medal	Lucy Beecroft, Jasmine Hutton, Gina Kennedy, Lucy Turmel	
2024	Silver medal	Jasmine Hutton, Gina Kennedy, Sarah-Jane Perry, Lucy Turmel	
2025	Gold medal	Grace Gear, Jasmine Hutton, Gina Kennedy, Sarah-Jane Perry	
2026	Gold medal	Jasmine Hutton, Gina Kennedy, Lucy Turmel, Torrie Malik	

== See also ==
- Squash in England
- England Squash & Racketball
- World Team Squash Championships
- England men's national squash team
- British National Squash Championships
