= 1980 European Squash Team Championships =

Squash tournament

- 8th
- Location: (Finland) Helsinki
- Date: 19 – 23 March 1980
- Website europeansquash.com

Results
- Champions: Men Sweden; Women England

The 1980 European Squash Team Championships was the 8th edition of European Squash Team Championships for squash players. The event was held in Helsinki, Finland, from 19 to 23 March 1980. The tournament was organised by the European Squash Rackets Federation (ESRF).

The Sweden men's team became the first team other than England to win the title. The success was regarded as a shock victory over the defending champions in the final. The England women's team won their 3rd title.

== Men's tournament ==
=== Group stage ===
Pool A

Pos	Team	P	W	L	Pts
1	England	4	4	0	8
2	Germany	4	3	1	6
3	Belgium	4	2	2	4
4	Switzerland	4	1	3	2
5	Norway	4	0	4	0

Pool B

Pos	Team	P	W	L	Pts
1	Sweden	4	4	0	8
2	Netherlands	4	3	1	6
3	Denmark	4	2	2	4
4	Monaco	4	1	3	2
5	Spain	4	0	4	0

Pool C

Pos	Team	P	W	L	Pts
1	Wales	4	4	0	8
2	Scotland	4	3	1	6
3	France	4	2	2	4
4	Greece	4	1	3	2
5	Italy	4	0	4	0

Pool D

Pos	Team	P	W	L	Pts
1	Finland	3	3	0	6
2	(Republic of Ireland) Ireland	3	2	1	4
3	Luxembourg	3	1	2	2
4	Austria	3	0	3	0

=== Semi finals ===
Team 1	Team 2	Score
England	Finland	5-0
Sweden	Wales	5-0

=== Third place ===
Finland
4
Third place

Wales
1

			1	2	3	4	5
1	(Finland) (Wales)	Harri Bucht; David Jude	9; 5	5; 9	9; 7	9; 4
2	(Finland) (Wales)	Roger Jones; Peter Rice	9; 4	9; 1	9; 6
3	(Finland) (Wales)	Kale Leskinen; Teifion Salisbury	5; 9	7; 9	2; 9
4	(Finland) (Wales)	Matti Saarela; Robert Dolman	9; 7	6; 9	9; 0	9; 3
5	(Finland) (Wales)	Markku Sainio; Peter Wilson	9; 5	9; 3	8; 10	8; 10	9; 4

=== Final ===
Sweden
3
Final

England
2

			1	2	3	4	5
1	(Sweden) (England)	Lars Kvant; Andrew Dwyer	9; 1	9; 7	9; 0
2	(Sweden) (England)	Mikael Hellström; Barry O'Connor	8; 10	9; 6	4; 9	0; 9
3	(Sweden) (England)	Johan Stockenberg; David Pearson	9; 4	9; 7	9; 5
4	(Sweden) (England)	Peter Boström; Ian Nuttall	9; 2	10; 8	9; 5
5	(Sweden) (England)	Stefan Winström; Philip Ayton	9; 2	5; 9	2; 9	8; 10

== Women's tournament ==
=== Group stage ===
Pool A

Pos	Team	P	W	L	Pts
1	England	2	2	0	4
2	Germany	2	1	1	2
3	Belgium	2	0	2	0

Pool B

Pos	Team	P	W	L	Pts
1	(Republic of Ireland) Ireland	2	2	0	4
2	Netherlands	2	1	1	2
3	Austria	2	0	2	0

Pool C

Pos	Team	P	W	L	Pts
1	Scotland	2	2	0	4
2	Finland	2	1	1	2
3	Denmark	2	0	2	0

Pool D

Pos	Team	P	W	L	Pts
1	Wales	2	2	0	4
2	Sweden	2	1	1	2
3	Switzerland	2	0	2	0

=== Semi-finals ===
Team 1	Team 2	Score
England	Wales	3-0
(Republic of Ireland) Ireland	Scotland	2-1

=== Third place ===
Scotland
2
Third place

Wales
1

			1	2	3	4	5
1	(Scotland) (Wales)	Alex Bostock
2	(Scotland) (Wales)	Dorothy Sharp
3	(Scotland) (Wales)	Liz Elgood

=== Final ===
England
3
Final

Ireland
0

			1	2	3	4	5
1	(England) (Republic of Ireland)	Lesley Moore; Geraldine Barniville
2	(England) (Republic of Ireland)	[[]] Irene Hewitt
3	(England) (Republic of Ireland)	[[]] Dorothy Armstrong
