= 1982 European Squash Team Championships =

Squash tournament

- 10th
- Location: (Wales) Cardiff
- Date: 8 – 10 April 1982
- Website europeansquash.com

Results
- Champions: Men England; Women England

The 1982 European Squash Team Championships was the 10th edition of European Squash Team Championships for squash players. The event was held in Cardiff, Wales, from 8 to 10 April 1982. The tournament was organised by the European Squash Rackets Federation (ESRF).

A new format was used in that the tournament consisted of a knock out rounds. The England men's team won their 9th title and the England women's team won their 5th title.

Ireland took third in the men's event and Scotland won bronze in the women's event.

== Men's tournament ==
=== First Round ===
Team 1	Team 2	Score
Luxembourg	Italy	3-2
Greece	Norway	4-1
Spain	Austria	5-0

=== Second Round ===
Team 1	Team 2	Score
Germany	France	3-2
England	Luxembourg	5-0
Scotland	Monaco	5-0
Finland	Switzerland	5-0
Wales	Belgium	5-0
(Republic of Ireland) Ireland	Spain	5-0
Netherlands	Denmark	5-0
Sweden	Greece	5-0

=== Quarter finals ===
Team 1	Team 2	Score
England	Germany	5-0
Finland	Scotland	4-1
(Republic of Ireland) Ireland	Wales	4-1
Sweden	Netherlands	4-1

=== Semi finals ===
Team 1	Team 2	Score
England	Finland	5-0
Sweden	(Republic of Ireland) Ireland	5-0

=== Third place ===
Ireland
3
Third place

Finland
2

			1	2	3	4	5
1	(Republic of Ireland) (Finland)	David Gotto; Harri Bucht	9; 7	10; 9	9; 7
2	(Republic of Ireland) (Finland)	Gar Holohan; Roger Jones	5; 9	6; 3				retired
3	(Republic of Ireland) (Finland)	Richie Power; Kale Leskinen	9; 7	9; 0	9; 4
4	(Republic of Ireland) (Finland)	Willie Hosey; Matti Saarela	6; 9	5; 9	3; 9
5	(Republic of Ireland) (Finland)	John Fleury; Markku Sainio	1; 9	4; 9	9; 3	9; 8	4; 9

=== Final ===
England
5
Final

Sweden
0

			1	2	3	4	5
1	(England) (Sweden)	Gawain Briars; Lars Kvant	9; 4	9; 7	9; 5
2	(England) (Sweden)	Phil Kenyon; Mikael Hellström	9; 5	9; 5	9; 3
3	(England) (Sweden)	Peter Verow; Claes Eriksson	9; 4	9; 1	9; 2
4	(England) (Sweden)	Ian Robinson; Jan-Ulf Söderberg	4; 9	9; 4	8; 10	9; 6	9; 6
5	(England) (Sweden)	Andrew Dwyer; Fredrik Johnson	9; 3	9; 2	9; 4

== Women's tournament ==
=== First Round ===
Team 1	Team 2	Score
Germany	Switzerland	3-0
England	Italy	3-0
Scotland	Luxembourg	3-0
Finland	Denmark	3-0
Wales	Monaco	3-0
(Republic of Ireland) Ireland	Norway	3-0
Netherlands	Belgium	3-0
Sweden	France	2-1

=== Quarter finals ===
Team 1	Team 2	Score
England	Germany	3-0
Scotland	Finland	3-0
(Republic of Ireland) Ireland	Netherlands	3-0
Wales	Sweden	3-0

=== Semi-finals ===
Team 1	Team 2	Score
England	Scotland	3-0
(Republic of Ireland) Ireland	Wales	2-1

=== Third place ===
Scotland
2
Third place

Wales
1

			1	2	3	4	5
1	(Scotland) (Wales)	Rae Lynch; Deanna Murray	9; 10	0; 9	2; 9
2	(Scotland) (Wales)	Anne Smith; Sian Washer	9; 5	4; 9	1; 9	9; 5	9; 7
3	(Scotland) (Wales)	Anne Bauermeister; Christina Rees	10; 9	10; 9	9; 8	2; 9	0; 9

=== Final ===
England
3
Final

Ireland
0

			1	2	3	4	5
1	(England) (Republic of Ireland)	Lisa Opie; Geraldine Barniville	5; 9	10; 9	9; 4	9; 5
2	(England) (Republic of Ireland)	Martine Le Moignan; Irene Hewitt	9; 1	9; 2	9; 6
3	(England) (Republic of Ireland)	Barbara Diggens; Marjorie Burke	9; 4	9; 2	9; 4
