= Averil Morris =

English squash player

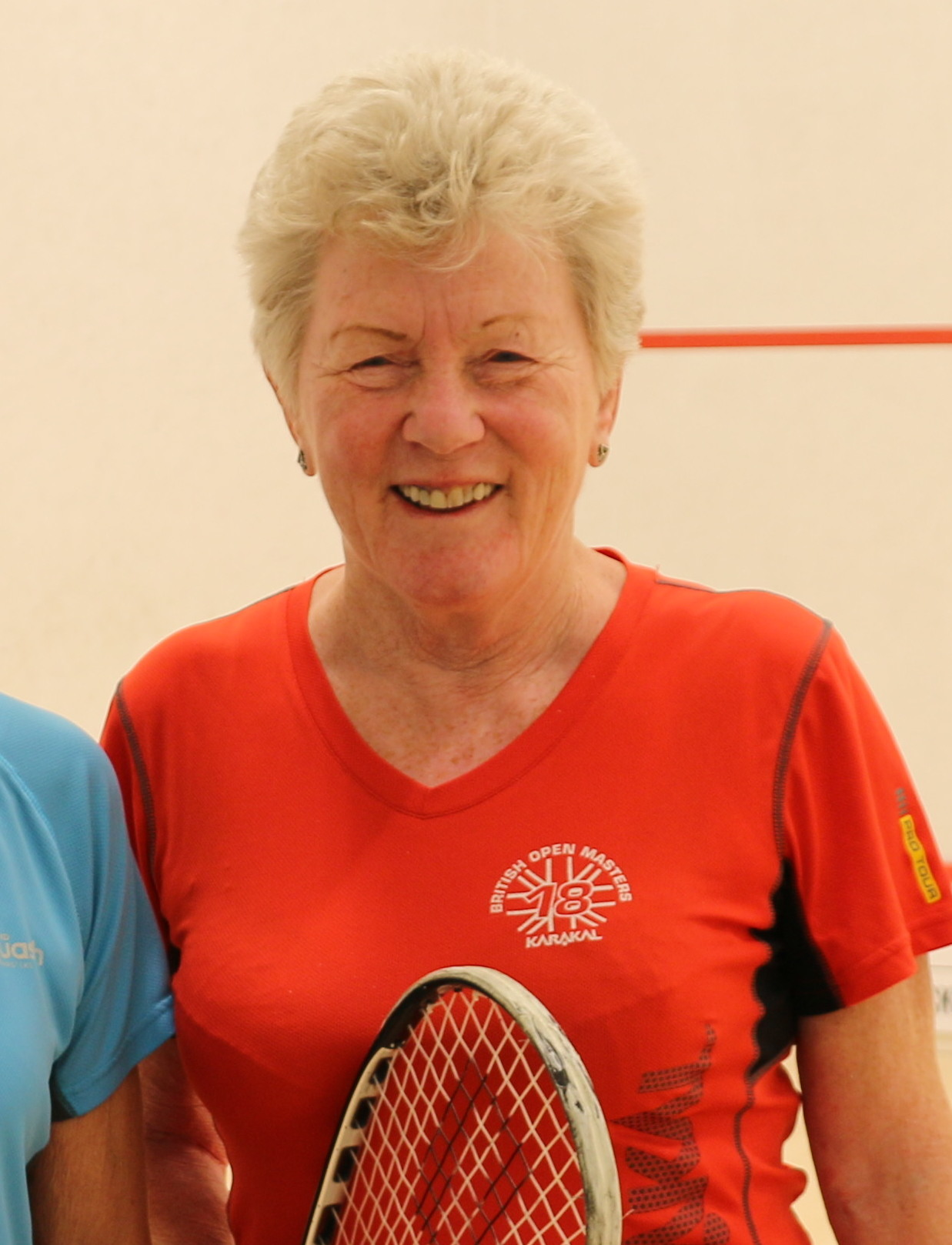

Personal information
- Nationality: British (English)
- Born: 17 December 1947 (age 78)
Medal record
Representing England
European Team Championships
Gold medal – first place	1978 Amsterdam	Team
Gold medal – first place	1979 Hamburg	Team

Averil Morris married name Averil Murphy (born 17 December 1947) is a former English professional squash player.

== Biography ==
Morris was a competent tennis player and represented Essex at county level. However, it was at squash that she excelled and played for and was captain of the Connaught club in Chingford, London. By 1977 she was ranked in Britain's top 10 and progressed to number 8 by September.

Morris won two gold medals for the England women's national squash team at the European Squash Team Championships during the 1978 European Squash Team Championships and 1979 European Squash Team Championships.

Later she married and played under the name Averil Murphy. In 2014, she won a fifth world masters title.
