= Ruth Strauss =

English squash player

Personal information
- Born: 14 March 1963 (age 63) Southend-on-Sea, England

Sport
- Country: England
- Highest ranking: No. 18 (January 1985)
Medal record
Women's squash
Representing England
World Team Squash Championships
Silver medal – second place	1983	Perth
European Team Championships
Gold medal – first place	1982 Cardiff	Team
Gold medal – first place	1983 Munich	Team
Gold medal – first place	1986 Aix-en-Provence	Team

Ruth Strauss (born 14 March 1963) is a former English professional squash player. She reached a career high ranking of 18 in the world during January 1985 and was three-times European team champion.

== Biography ==
Strauss born in Southend-on-Sea, played for the Thorpe Bay club in Southend.

In 1977 she was the youngest girl to reach the final of the British Girls' squash championship and by 1978 was the number 1 ranked British U19 player. Later that year she was also ranked the number 1 British U23 player at the age of only 15 and broke into the British top 10 at senior level.

In January 1980, she received her first England call up for the home international squash championships. Strauss became British U23 champion and won three gold medals for the England women's national squash team at the European Squash Team Championships during the 1982 European Squash Team Championships, 1983 European Squash Team Championships and 1986 European Squash Team Championships.

Additionally, she won a silver medal for England at the 1983 Women's World Team Squash Championships, where England finished as runners-up, losing 2-1 in the final to Australia.

After a decade of representing England, she had dropped out of the British top ten in 1989 but continued to play for Essex at county level and Courtlands at club level.
