= Teresa Lawes =

English squash player

Personal information
- Born: Q1.1948 Beckenham, Kent, England

Sport
- Country: England
Medal record
Representing Great Britain
Women's squash
World Team Squash Championships
Gold medal – first place	1979 Birmingham	Team
Representing England
European Team Championships
Gold medal – first place	1978 Amsterdam	Team
Gold medal – first place	1979 Hamburg	Team

Teresa M. Lawes married name Brooke (born Q1. 1948) is a former English professional squash player. She helped Great Britain become world team champions in 1979.

== Biography ==
Lawes, born in Beckenham, England, learned to play squash in New Zealand after emigrating at the age of four with her parents. She won the 1970 New Zealand title before returning to England and settling in Golders Green in 1971. After returning to England she represented Kent at county level.

Lawes won the 1973 Mercia Squash tournament at Malvern and in 1974 won the Welsh championship.

In June 1974 she was ranked sixth in Britain. By the end of 1974, Lawes had risen to third in the UK rankings and was first capped by Great Britain in January 1975 after being called up for the three match test series against Australia. She then won the Scottish championship and reached the position of British number 2. Lawes was twice runner-up in the British Amateur Closed Championships in 1975 and 1977, losing out to Sue Cogswell on both occasions.

Her greatest feat was helping Great Britain to become world champions at the 1979 Women's World Team Squash Championships in Birmingham. The other team members consisted of Sue Cogswell, Angela Smith, Lesley Moore, Barbara Diggens and Jayne Ashton.

Lawes also won two gold medals for the England women's national squash team at the European Squash Team Championships during the 1978 European Squash Team Championships and 1979 European Squash Team Championships.

Lawes played under her married name of Brooke from late 1980 and moved to Hong Kong and also won the 1983 Japanese Open.
