= Carol Weymuller =

American squash and tennis player (born 1949)

- Full name: Carol Mae Hunter Weymuller
- Country (sports): United States
- Born: 1949 (age 75–76)

Singles

Grand Slam singles results
- US Open: 1R (1968)

Carol Mae Hunter Weymuller (born 1949) is an American former squash and tennis player.

Weymuller, originally from Michigan, had success in junior tennis during the early 1960s, winning Orange Bowl titles in both the 14s and 16s age divisions. She competed in the women's singles main draw of the US Open.

A member of the U.S. Squash Hall of Fame, Weymuller was a nationally ranked player who featured in multiple editions of the World Open and World Team Squash Championships. She was an important figure in popularizing the sport in New York City and has a tournament on the PSA World Tour named after her.

== Personal life ==
In 1972 she was married to Charles Frederick "Fred" Weymuller, a tennis and squash teaching professional.
