= Alex Cowie =

British squash and tennis player

Alex Cowie née Alex Soady
- Country (sports): Great Britain
- Born: 11 May 1947 (age 79) Birmingham, England

Singles

Grand Slam singles results
- Wimbledon: 2R (1967, 1968, 1971, 1972)

Doubles

Grand Slam doubles results
- Wimbledon: 2R (1967, 1968, 1969, 1970)

Grand Slam mixed doubles results
- Wimbledon: 3R (1969, 1972)
Medal record
Representing England
Women's squash
European Team Championships
Gold medal – first place	1985 Barcelona	Team

Alexandra Cowie née Soady (born 11 May 1947) is a British former international squash and tennis player. She competed under her maiden name Alex Soady until 1969.

== Biography ==
Initially a tennis player, Cowie made several appearances at Wimbledon in the 1960s and 1970s.

Cowie featured at the World Squash Championships in 1985 and 1987. She was later the coach of Cassie Jackman and served as team manager of the women's national team. Cowie won a gold medal for the England women's national squash team at the European Squash Team Championships at the 1985 European Squash Team Championships in Barcelona.

Her son Stuart Cowie was a Scottish international squash player.
