= Robyn Blackwood =

New Zealand squash player

Robyn Blackwood Robyn Brownlee
Personal information
- Nationality: New Zealander
- Born: 22 April 1958 (age 68) Hamilton, New Zealand

Sport
- Highest ranking: 9 (January 1984)
Medal record
World Team Championships
Bronze medal – third place	1981 Canada	Team
Bronze medal – third place	1983 Perth	Team

Robyn Anne Aileen Blackwood married name Robyn Brownlee (born 22 April 1958) is a former professional squash player from New Zealand who reached a career high world ranking of 9 and won two bronze medals at the World Team Championships.

== Biography ==
Blackwood was born in Hamilton, New Zealand. She was the women's New Zealand number one and sister of the world ranked Craig Blackwood, and lived in Queensland. She represented New Zealand in the 1981 Women's World Team Squash Championships and 1983 Women's World Team Squash Championships.

In 1983 she won the Scottish Open Championship.

She married Bruce Brownlee who was also a leading squash player.
