= Rae Anderson (squash player) =

Australian squash player (born 1953)

Personal information
- Nationality: Australian
- Born: 8 April 1953 (age 73) Australia

Sport
- Highest ranking: 10 (1986)
Medal record
Women's squash
Representing Australia
World Team Championships
Gold medal – first place	1981 Canada	Team

Rae Anderson (born 8 April 1953) is an Australian former professional squash player. She reached a career high ranking of 10 in the world during 1986 and was a world team champion.

== Biography ==
Anderson started playing tennis before turning to squash in 1974 in Ringwood, Melbourne. She was the winner of the 1977 Western Victorian Open, 1979 Port Adelaide Opem, 1980 Belgian Open and 1981 Irish Open.

Anderson represented the Australia women's national squash team and won a gold medal at the World Team Championships in Canada.
