= Barbara Wall =

Australian squash player (born 1948)

Personal information
- Nationality: Australian
- Born: 25 May 1948 (age 78) Perth, Western Australia

Sport
- Turned pro: 1973

Women's singles
- Highest ranking: 4 (March 1979)
Medal record
Women's squash
Representing Australia
World Team Championships
Silver medal – second place	1979 Birmingham	Team

Barbara Wall (born 25 May 1948) is an Australian former professional squash player. She reached a career high ranking of 4 in the world during 1979 and was a world team silver medalist.

== Biography ==
Wall turned professional in 1973, the first Australian woman to do so.

She travelled overseas in 1976 and the following year in 1977, though unseeded, managed to make the final of the British Open, where she lost to her compatriot Heather McKay. Wall followed up with victories in the Danish, Irish, and Belgian Open Championships and a win at the South African Champion of Champions. In 1979, she won the British Open as the number 8 seed, beating Sue Cogswell of England in the final 8–10, 6–9, 9–4, 9–4, 9–3.

Wall represented Australia in the 1979 Women's World Team Squash Championships where she won a silver medal with the team.

Wall trained under Shirley de la Hunty and was named Western Australian Sports Star of the Year in 1979 and was inducted into the Western Australian Hall of Champions in 1988.
