= Sue Newman (squash player) =

Australian squash player

Sport
- Country: Australia
Medal record
Women's squash
Representing Australia
World Championships
Bronze medal – third place	1976 Brisbane	Singles
- Updated on 20 December 2011

Sue Newman (married name Sue King) is an Australian former professional squash player. She won the British Open in 1978, beating her compatriot Vicki Hoffman in the final 9–4, 9–7, 9–2. Newman was also runner-up at the British Open in 1976, when she lost in the final to Australia's Heather McKay and one of the two bronze medalists (along with Margaret Zachariah) at the 1976 Brisbane Women's World Open Squash Championships.

Sue represented Australia in the 1979 Women's World Team Squash Championships, where the Australian team were the runners-up.
