= Angela Smith (squash player) =

English squash player

Personal information
- Nationality: British (English)
- Born: 3 July 1953 (age 73) Stoke-on-Trent, Staffordshire, England

Sport
- Highest ranking: No. 2 (January 1979)
Medal record
Women's squash
Representing England
World Championships
Bronze medal – third place	1979 Sheffield	Singles
Bronze medal – third place	1981 Toronto	Singles
European Team Championships
Gold medal – first place	1984 Dublin	Team

Angela Smith (born 3 July 1953) is an English retired professional squash player who reached a career high ranking of 2 in the world during May 1986. She was also the first female squash player to turn professional and was widely recognized for changing the face of women's squash by doing so.

== Biography ==
=== Playing ===
Smith was coached by Nasrullah Khan, who also coached Jonah Barrington. She enjoyed a meteoric rise to the top, reaching a ranking of 2 in the UK upon her first entry into the list. She reached the semifinals of the British Open Squash Championships eight times, and won the Spanish, Portuguese, Canadian, US, Norwegian, Israel (a record six times) and Bermuda Opens. She was British champion in 1976.

Smith was part of the winning British team during the 1979 Women's World Team Squash Championships and runner-up in the 1981 Women's World Team Squash Championships.

On two further occasions, when England reached the World Team Championships final, both against Australia, she won her matches whilst the team were defeated 2-1. Her pride in playing for her country was obvious and she was undefeated whilst on International duty for Great Britain. Smith captained and played in the World International Team in test matches against South Africa. Along with Rhonda Thorne, she was invited to open the courts in Monaco for and in the presence of Prince Rainier and his family. She held dozens of English domestic and regional titles in her career. Smith coached the national teams for the Bahamas, Spain, and Hong Kong and was also the United States men's squash team coach from 1980 to 1982. The US Squash team that travelled to South Africa to train and onto Australia included Gil Mateer (as captain), Ned Edwards, Mark Alger and Jon Foster. She was also Britain's first squash representative in the Australia Games.

Smith had a long rivalry with Sue Cogswell for the British number one spot over many years, and her matches against Vicki Hoffman (now Cardwell) were felt to be pure theatre, especially those taking place in the British Open Squash Championships. Smith was one of a very few players to win a game against Australian player Heather McKay, at the 1979 Women's World Open Squash Championship.

She was the first female squash player to appear on popular British TV shows Superstars and A Question of Sport.

=== Coaching ===
Her first overseas position was as squash coach at the prestigious Vertical Club in Manhattan, New York, where Vitas Gerulaitis was the tennis pro. Her contract there was said to be the most lucrative of its kind in the sport at that time. There she coached many famous personalities of the time, such as Jackie Kennedy.

Following her successful period in the States and her significant input into the Women's Sport Foundation of America, Smith took up an even greater challenge in Nassau, in The Bahamas, where she took squash from the realms of an expat sport to one embraced by locals. She was instrumental in Shell sponsoring the squash programme. Several of the juniors that Smith coached later went on to play on the world circuit themselves.

Following her six years in Nassau, she was based in Barcelona, Spain at the Can Melich club where she was again a great success, helping to organise amongst other events the European Junior championships. She also coached and helped further develop the game in Hong Kong, Bermuda, Trinidad and Tobago, St Vincent and Kenya. She did all this whilst jetting to and from the UK and world circuits to compete in the necessary events to allow her to represent her country and also maintain her place in the world rankings.

After Smith's immediate success as a professional, making a career from tournament play rather than just coaching, Sue Cogswell followed suit at the end of 1980 and the UK women's squash game was quickly forced to become "open."

Smith also organised and promoted the first women's squash events in the Middle East, in Dubai and Bahrain. Along with Jayne Ashton of England and Sue Newman, Barbara Wall and Lyle Hubinger of Australia, she formed WISPA, the professional ladies' body for squash, in 1979. To this day, WISPA remains the governing body of the ladies game.

Smith was General Manager of the ladies teams and an ambassador for Stoke City football club and set up the successful academy operating out of Shanghai. She is a commentator for BBC Radio Stoke on Stoke City F.C. matches

She now works with Everton FC placing the International Academy Affiliate partnerships world wide and is currently overseeing those in Egypt. Canada and Malaysia

== Personal life ==
Smith is a lifelong fan of Stoke City Football Club.

She is also a trustee of Xpro, the charity for ex-professional footballers, MacariFoundation, a charity for the homeless and chair of Stoke City Supporters Council.
