= Barbara Diggens =

English squash player

Barbara Diggens (née Cooper)
Personal information
- Nationality: British (English)
- Born: 8 October 1949 (age 76) Hove, East Sussex, England

Sport

Women's singles
Medal record
Women's squash
Representing Great Britain
World Team Squash Championships
Gold medal – first place	1979	Brisbane
Silver medal – second place	1983	Perth
Representing England
European Team Championships
Gold medal – first place	1980 Helsinki	Team
Gold medal – first place	1981 Amsterdam	Team
Gold medal – first place	1982 Cardiff	Team
Gold medal – first place	1983 Munich	Team

Barbara Diggens (née Cooper), (born 8 October 1949) is a former English professional squash player.

== Biography ==
Born as Barabara Cooper on 8 October 1949 in Hove, East Sussex, she started playing aged 19 at the Hove Squash Club and became a professional tennis and squash coach.

Her greatest achievement was being part of the winning England team during the 1979 Women's World Team Squash Championships. She also represented England at the 1983 Women's World Team Squash Championships, where England finished as runners-up, losing 2-1 in the final to Australia.

Diggens won four gold medals for the England women's national squash team at the European Squash Team Championships in 1980, 1981, 1982 and 1983.
