= Rhonda Thorne =

Australian squash player (born 1958)

Rhonda Thorne AM née Shapland
Personal information
- Nationality: Australian
- Born: 6 February 1958 (age 68) Toowoomba, Australia

Sport
- Handedness: Right-Handed
- Retired: 1985

Women's Singles
- Highest ranking: 1
- World Open: W (1981)
Medal record
Women's squash
Representing Australia
World Championships
Gold medal – first place	1981 Toronto	Singles
Silver medal – second place	1983 Perth	Singles
World Team Championships
Silver medal – second place	1979 Birmingham	Team
Gold medal – first place	1981 Canada	Team
Gold medal – first place	1983 Perth	Team

Rhonda Thorne (born 6 February 1958) (also known as Rhonda Clayton AM and Rhonda Shapland) is an Australian former World No. 1 squash player. She was one of the leading players on the international squash circuit in the late 1970s and early 1980s becoming the world champion in 1981 and reached a career high ranking of No.1 in the world.

== Biography ==
Born Rhonda Shapland, she married Ross Thorne, a notable squash player in 1978 and played under her married name thereafter. As a junior player, Thorne won four Australian Junior Opens in 1972, 1974, 1975, and 1976. Thorne was at the pinnacle of her game in the early 1980s, and held the World No.1 ranking in both 1981 and 1982. She remained in the world's top-10 from 1979 to 1984.

In the 1981 World Open final in Toronto, Canada, Thorne beat fellow Australian player Vicki Cardwell 8–10, 9–4, 9–5, 7–9, 9–7 to become world champion. Thorne and Cardwell reached the World Open final again in 1983 when it was held in Perth, with Cardwell winning this time 9–1, 9–3, 9–4.

Thorne represented Australia in international team squash for seven years from 1977 to 1984. She captained the Australian team from 1981 to 1983, during which time the team won two World Team Squash Championship titles.

Thorne retired from the international squash circuit in 1985. That year she won the Queensland Sportswoman of the Year award. Since retiring, she has been inducted into the Squash Australia Hall of Fame and was an inaugural member of the Queensland Squash Hall of Fame. She was also awarded the Australian Sports Medal in 2000 recognition for her achievements.

She was awarded as a Member of the Order of Australia AM in 2023.
