= Geraldine Barniville =

Irish squash and tennis player (1942–2026)

- Country (sports): Ireland
- Born: 7 November 1942
- Died: 30 January 2026 (aged 83)
- Plays: Left-handed

Singles

Grand Slam singles results
- Wimbledon: 1R (1961, 1964)
- US Open: 2R (1964)

Doubles

Grand Slam doubles results
- Wimbledon: 2R (1972)

Grand Slam mixed doubles results
- Wimbledon: 2R (1964)
Medal record
Women's squash
Representing Ireland
European Championships
Silver medal – second place	1978 Amsterdam	Team
Silver medal – second place	1979 Hamburg	Team
Silver medal – second place	1980 Helsinki	Team
Silver medal – second place	1981 Amsterdam	Team
Silver medal – second place	1982 Cardiff	Team
Silver medal – second place	1983 Munich	Team
Irish Championships
Gold medal – first place	1977, 1981	singles

Geraldine Barniville (nee Houlihan; 7 November 1942 – 30 January 2026) was an Irish squash and tennis player. She was a native of Birr in County Offaly and came from a prominent legal family (of the D.A. Houlihan law firm).

== Career ==
As a tennis player, Barniville won a record nine Carrickmines titles during her career, the first in 1963. At the 1964 U.S. National Championships she faced the eighth-seeded Carole Caldwell in the second round and pushed her deep into the third set. She played in 10 Federation Cup ties for Ireland between 1964 and 1977.

Barniville played more than 70 times for Ireland in tennis and also competed for Ireland.

Despite not picking up squash until the age of 24, Barniville ended up competing at the World Championships. She competed three times with the Irish national team at the World Teams Championships and from 1978 to 1983, was part of the team that was six times in a row runner-up in the European Team Championships.

Additionally, she won the Irish national title in 1977 and 1981.

== Personal life and death ==
Barniville was married to the late tennis player Harry Barniville and their son David is a High Court judge. She died on 30 January 2026, at the age of 83.
