= Margaret Zachariah =

Australian squash player

Margaret Zachariah OAM
Personal information
- Nationality: Australian
- Born: c.1944

Sport
Medal record
Women's squash
Representing Australia
World Championships
Bronze medal – third place	1976 Brisbane	Singles

Margaret Lorraine Zachariah (born c.1944) is a former professional squash player fro Australia who won the bronze medal at the 1976 World championships.

== Biography ==
Zachariah was a bronze medalist at the 1976 World Open Championships in Brisbane.

In 1981, she was runner-up to her compatriot Vicki Cardwell at the British Open and She won the Australian Amateur Championship in 1977, and captured four Victoria state amateur squash championship titles in 1974, 1975, 1976 and 1979. Since retiring as a player, Zachariah has worked as a squash coach, training some of Australia's top players. She has also served as Secretary of both the Professional Squash Coaches Association of Australia and the Professional Squash Coaches Association of Victoria.

In the 2025 King's Birthday Honours, Zachariah was awarded the Medal of the Order of Australia, for services to squash.
