= Jayne Ashton =

English squash player

Personal information
- Nationality: British (English)
- Born: 31 August 1957 (age 68) Birmingham, England

Sport
Medal record
Women's squash
Representing Great Britain
World Team Championships
Gold medal – first place	1979 Birmingham	Team

Jayne Ashton (born 31 August 1957) is a former professional squash player from England and was a world team champion.

== Biography ==
Ashton was born in Birmingham. She was first capped for England in 1973, the year she became British Junior Champion. She competed as a top-sixteen seeded player at the British Open Squash Championships but her greatest achievement was being part of the winning Great Britain team during the 1979 Women's World Team Squash Championships, defeating Australia 3-0 in the final.

In 1979 she won both the New Zealand Open and national championships. She played for Warwickshire at county level and Edgbaston Priory at club level.
