= Sue Cogswell =

English squash player (born 1951)

Personal information
- Nationality: British (English)
- Born: 7 September 1951 (age 74) Birmingham, England

Sport
- Highest ranking: 8 (January 1984)
Medal record
Women's squash
Representing England
World Championships
Silver medal – second place	1979 Sheffield	Singles
World Team Championships
Gold medal – first place	1979 Birmingham	Team
Silver medal – second place	1981 Canada	Team

Sue Cogswell (born 7 September 1951) is a former squash player from England. She was runner-up at the 1979 Women's World Open Squash Championship, where she lost in the final to the Australian Heather McKay 6–9, 9–3, 9–1, 9–4. She reached a career high ranking of 8 in the world during 1984.

== Biography ==
Cogswell was also a three-time runner-up at the British Open, losing in the final to McKay in 1974, to Barbara Wall in 1979, and to Vicki Cardwell in 1980. Cogswell won the British National Squash Championship title five times in 1975 and 1977–79.

Cogswell was part of the winning British team during the 1979 Women's World Team Squash Championships and runner-up in the 1981 Women's World Team Squash Championships.
