= Vicki Cardwell =

Australian squash player (born 1955)

Vicki Cardwell (née Hoffmann)
Personal information
- Born: 21 April 1955 (age 71) Adelaide

Sport
- Country: Australia
- Retired: 1997

Women's Singles
- Highest ranking: 1 (March, 1983)
- World Open: W (1983)
Medal record
Women's squash
Representing Australia
World Championships
Gold medal – first place	1983 Perth	Singles
Silver medal – second place	1981 Toronto	Singles
Bronze medal – third place	1987 Auckland	Singles
- Updated on 20 December 2011

Vicki Cardwell BEM (née Hoffmann, born 21 April 1955, in Adelaide, South Australia) is an Australian former World No. 1 squash player. She was one of the leading players on the international squash circuit from the late 1970s through to the mid-1990s. During her career, she won the World Open in 1983, and the British Open title four consecutive times in 1980-83.

Since retiring from the top-level game, Cardwell has enjoyed continued success in seniors events. She won four World Masters Championships titles between 1987 and 1995.

Cardwell has been inducted into the Australian Sport Hall of Fame and the Squash Australia Hall of Fame. The Australian government has also acknowledged her contribution and services to Australian sport by awarding her the British Empire Medal.

== See also ==
- Official Women's Squash World Ranking
- List of WISPA number 1 ranked players
- British Open Squash Championships

Sporting positions
Preceded by First #1	World No. 1 March 1983 – February 1984	Succeeded by Susan Devoy
