= 1992 Women's British Open Squash Championship =

British Open Squash Championships
- 64th Women's British Open Championships

Details
- Location: London, England
- Venue: Lambs Squash Club & Wembley Conference Centre

The 1992 Hi-Tec British Open Squash Championships was held at the Lambs Squash Club with the later stages being held at the Wembley Conference Centre in London from 7–13 April 1992. The event was won by Susan Devoy who defeated Martine Le Moignan in the final.

== Seeds ==
1. (New Zealand) Susan Devoy
2. (Australia) Robyn Lambourne (née Friday)
3. (Guernsey) Martine Le Moignan
4. (Australia) Michelle Martin
5. (Guernsey) Lisa Opie
6. (England) Cassie Jackman
7. (Australia) Liz Irving
8. (England) Sue Wright
9. (Canada) Heather Wallace
10. (Australia) Danielle Drady
11. (England) Suzanne Horner (née Burgess)
12. (England) Fiona Geaves
13. (Republic of Ireland) Rebecca Best
14. (Australia) Sarah Fitzgerald
15. (England) Lucy Soutter
16. (Australia) Sharon Bradey

== Draw and results ==
=== First round ===
Player One	Player Two	Score
(England) Rebecca Poole	(Australia) Marianne MacDonald	9–7 9–3 9–4
(England) Jeanine Leatherbarrow	(England) Paula Anderson	6–9 9–6 9–4 5–9 9–7
(United States) Demer Holleran	(England) Jackie Dimmock	9–5 3–9 10–8 9–4
(Netherlands) Denise Sommers	(England) Sue Downhill	9–0 9–4 9–3
(Netherlands) Nicole Beumer	(England) Carolyn Mett	9–5 3–9 9–4 8–9 10–8
(England) Senga Macfie	(England) Sally Felton	9–7 9–3 9–7
(England) Linda Charman	(Sweden) Eva Svenby	9–4 9–2 9–1
(Netherlands) Hugoline Van Hoorn	(Denmark) Elsebeth Jensen	9–0 9–1 9–0

=== Second round ===
Player One	Player Two	Score
(New Zealand) Susan Devoy	(Australia) Carol Owens	9–4 9–1 9–4
(Netherlands) Hugoline Van Hoorn	(Australia) Danielle Drady	6–9 10–8 9–7 9–3
(England) Sue Wright	(Netherlands) Denise Sommers	9–6 9–7 9–3
(Canada) Heather Wallace	(Finland) Nina Taimiaho	9–3 9–0 9–0
(England) Cassie Jackman	(England) Rebecca Macree	9–2 9–1 9–2
(England) Linda Charman	(England) Lucy Soutter	9–0 9–3 9–1
(Australia) Michelle Martin	(England) Rebecca Poole	9–0 9–0 9–2
(England) Suzanne Horner	(England) Jane Martin	9–7 10–8 9–3
(Guernsey) Martine Le Moignan	(Netherlands) Babette Hoogendoorn	10–8 9–3 9–2
(Australia) Sarah Fitzgerald	(United States) Demer Holleran	9–3 9–8 9–0
(Australia) Liz Irving	(England) Senga Macfie	10–9 19–0 9–3
(South Africa) Claire Nitch	(Australia) Sharon Bradey	7–9 9–2 10–8 10–8
(Guernsey) Lisa Opie	(Finland) Tuula Myllyniemi	9–6 9–2 9–0
(Republic of Ireland) Rebecca Best	(Netherlands) Nicole Beumer	4–9 10–8 9–2 9–6
(Australia) Robyn Lambourne	(England) Jeanine Leatherbarrow	9–1 9–0 9–1
(England) Fiona Geaves	(Germany) Sabine Schoene	9–7 9–1 9–2

=== Third round ===
Player One	Player Two	Score
(New Zealand) Devoy	(Netherlands) Van Hoorn	9–3 9–1 9–3
(England) Wright	(Canada) Wallace	9–5 9–0 5–9 9–0
(England) Jackman	(England) Charman	6–9 9–4 9–4 9–2
(Australia) Martin	(England) Horner	9–2 9–2 9–1
(Guernsey) Le Moignan	(Australia) Fitzgerald	9–3 9–3 9–6
(Australia) Irving	(South Africa) Nitch	5–9 9–4 8–10 9–2 9–8
(Guernsey) Opie	(Republic of Ireland) Best	4–9 9–7 9–2 9–3
(Australia) Lambourne	(England) Geaves	9–1 9–1 9–7

=== Quarter-finals ===
Player One	Player Two	Score
(New Zealand) Devoy	(England) Wright	9–2 5–9 9–0 9–4
(England) Jackman	(Australia) Martin	9–7 9–1 2–9 9–5
(Guernsey) Le Moignan	(Australia) Irving	9–4 9–7 4–9 9–3
(Guernsey) Opie	(Australia) Lambourne	3–9 9–7 9–6 9–3

=== Semi-finals ===
Player One	Player Two	Score
(New Zealand) Devoy	(England) Jackman	9–3 10–9 9–6
(Guernsey) Le Moignan	(Guernsey) Opie	9–6 9–5 9–6

=== Final ===
Player One	Player Two	Score
(New Zealand) Devoy	(Guernsey) Le Moigan	9–3 9–5 9–3

Preceded by 1991	British Open Squash Championships; England (London); 1992	Succeeded by 1993
