= 1990 Women's British Open Squash Championship =

British Open Squash Championships
- 62nd Women's British Open Championships

Details
- Location: London, England
- Venue: Lambs Squash Club & Wembley

The 1990 Hi-Tec British Open Squash Championships was held at the lambs Squash Club with the later stages being held at Wembley in London from 16–23 April 1990. The event was won for the seventh consecutive year by Susan Devoy who defeated Suzanne Horner (née Burgess) in the final.

== Seeds ==
1. (New Zealand) Susan Devoy
2. (Australia) Danielle Drady
3. (Guernsey) Lisa Opie
4. (Guernsey) Martine Le Moignan
5. (Australia) Liz Irving

(England) Lucy Soutter seed 11

(England) Suzanne Horner (née Burgess) seed 12

== Draw and results ==
=== First round ===
| Player One | Player Two | Score |
|---|---|---|
| (South Africa) Chantel Clifton Parks | (England) N Boddington | 9–8 9–10 1–9 10–8 9–3 |
| (England) Rachel Marriott | (Scotland) Louise Philip | 9–3 9–6 9–1 |
| (England) Jane Martin | (England) Carolyn Mett | 9–6 9–2 9–5 |
| (South Africa) Claire Nitch | (Netherlands) Hugoline Van Hoorn | 9–4 9–4 9–6 |
| (England) Senga Macfie | (England) Angela Smith | 9–6 6–9 9–3 10–8 |
| (England) Rebecca Macree | (South Africa) Angelique Clifton Parks | 1–9 10–9 6–9 9–6 9–1 |
| (England) Linda Charman | (Wales) Tracey Thomas | 7–9 9–0 9–1 9–0 |
| (England) Donna Vardy | (England) Liz Brown | 9–4 9–3 9–0 |

=== Second round ===
| Player One | Player Two | Score |
|---|---|---|
| (New Zealand) Susan Devoy | (West Germany) Daniela Grzenia | 9–2 9–2 9–4 |
| (Australia) Danielle Drady | | |
| (Guernsey) Lisa Opie | (England) Jane Martin | 10–8 9–3 9–1 |
| (Guernsey) Martine Le Moignan | (West Germany) Beate Muller | w/o |
| (Australia) Liz Irving | (Netherlands) Nicole Beumer | 9–5 9–1 9–1 |
| (Australia) Sarah Fitzgerald | (England) Rachel Marriott | 9–4 9–0 9–1 |
| (Netherlands) Babette Hoogendoorn | (Hong Kong) Dawn Olsen | 9–2 9–0 9–4 |
| (England) Fiona Geaves | (South Africa) Claire Nitch | 9–3 9–3 9–1 |
| (England) Alison Cumings | (Finland) Tuula Myllyniemi | 7–9 9–2 9–3 9–0 |
| (Republic of Ireland) Rebecca Best | (South Africa) Chantel Clifton Parks | 9–4 9–0 9–4 |
| (England) Sue Wright | (West Germany) Sabine Schoene | 9–3 9–0 7–9 9–5 |
| (Australia) Michelle Martin | (Finland) Nina Taimiaho | 9–2 9–7 9–3 |
| (England) Lucy Soutter | (England) Linda Charman | 9–1 9–2 9–1 |
| (England) Suzanne Horner (née Burgess) | (England) Rebecca Macree | 9–2 9–1 9–0 |
| (Canada) Heather Wallace | | |
| (Australia) Robyn Lambourne (née Friday) | (England) Senga Macfie | 9–3 9–1 9–7 |

=== Third round ===
| Player One | Player Two | Score |
|---|---|---|
| (New Zealand) Devoy | (Republic of Ireland) Best | 9–1 9–0 9–3 |
| (Australia) Drady | (Canada) Wallace | 9–2 9–5 9–2 |
| (Guernsey) Opie | (England) Wright | 9–3 6–9 9–3 5–9 10–8 |
| (Guernsey) Le Moignan | (England) Horner | 9–4 5–9 9–6 5–9 3–9 |
| (Australia) Irving | (England) Soutter | 2–9 7–9 9–2 10–8 4–9 |
| (Australia) Martin | (England) Geaves | 9–7 0–9 9–1 9–6 |
| (England) Cumings | (Australia) Fitzgerald | 9–5 9–0 9–5 |
| (Australia) Lambourne | (Netherlands) Hoogendoorn | 9–7 9–4 9–5 |

=== Quarter-finals ===
| Player One | Player Two | Score |
|---|---|---|
| (New Zealand) Devoy | (England) Cumings | 9–5 9–2 9–5 |
| (Australia) Drady | (England) Soutter | 9–4 9–2 6–9 3–9 5–9 |
| (Guernsey) Opie | (Australia) Martin | 5–9 9–6 4–9 9–2 2–9 |
| (England) Horner | (Australia) Lambourne | 9–1 8–10 4–9 9–2 9–4 |

=== Semi-finals ===
| Player One | Player Two | Score |
|---|---|---|
| (New Zealand) Devoy | (Australia) Martin | 5–9 10–8 9–4 9–5 |
| (England) Soutter | (England) Horner | |

=== Final ===
| Player One | Player Two | Score |
|---|---|---|
| (New Zealand) Devoy | (England) Horner | 9–2 1–9 9–3 9–3 |

| Preceded by 1989 | British Open Squash Championships; England (London); 1990 | Succeeded by 1991 |
