= 1987 Women's British Open Squash Championship =

British Open Squash Championships
- 59th Women's British Open Championships

Details
- Location: London, England
- Venue: South Bank Squash Club, Wandsworth & Wembley Conference Centre

The 1987 Women's Davies & Tate British Open Squash Championships was held at the South Bank Squash Club, Wandsworth with the later stages being held at the Wembley Conference Centre in London from 7–14 April 1987. The event was won for the fourth consecutive year by Susan Devoy who defeated Martine Le Moignan in the final.

== Seeds ==
1. (New Zealand) Susan Devoy
2. (Guernsey) Lisa Opie
3. (Guernsey) Martine Le Moignan
4. (England) Lucy Soutter
5. (Australia) Liz Irving
6. (Australia) Vicki Cardwell
7. (England) Suzanne Burgess
8. (England) Alison Cumings

(Scotland) Heather Wallace 10
(England) Angela Smith 11

(Australia) Cath Bellemore 15

== Draw and results ==
=== First round ===
Player one	Player two	Score
(New Zealand) Susan Devoy	(England) Pauline Nicholl	9-0 9-2 9-3
(Finland) Tuula Myllyniemi	(Australia) Rae Anderson	10-8 10-8 9-4
(Scotland) Heather Wallace	(England) Karen Read	9-3 9-2 9-0
(England) Barbara Diggens	(Australia) Carin Clonda	9-2 9-2 9-6
(England) Suzanne Burgess	(England) Sue Wright	9-5 9-0 9-0
(Singapore) Seok Hui Lim		
(Australia) Sarah Fitzgerald	(Sweden) Susanne Nyberg	9-0 9-3 9-0
(England) Fiona Geaves	(England) Alex Cowie	9-2 9-2 9-0
(Guernsey) Martine Le Moignan	(England) Annette Pilling	9-2 9-2 9-0
(Wales) Debbie Turnbull	(Netherlands) Babette Hoogendoorn	9-1 9-2 9-0
(New Zealand) Joanne Williams	(Australia) Robyn Friday	w/o
(England) Donna Vardy	(England) Natalie Le Serve	9-7 9-2 9-7
(Australia) Vicki Cardwell	(England) Paula Anderson	9-1 9-2 9-0
(England) Debbie Wright	(England) Jane Parker	9-4 9-1 9-2
(Australia) Sharon Bradey	(England) Jayne Ashton	9-1 9-6 9-7
(Republic of Ireland) Marjorie Burke		
(England) Lucy Soutter	(England) Rachel Marriott	9-5 9-2 9-0
(England) Cassie Jackman	(England) Jane Reeves	9-0 9-2 9-6
(Australia) Michelle Martin	(England) Heather Rutt	9-2 9-1 9-3
(Australia) Mary Jo Reid	(Scotland) Shirley Brown	9-4 9-0 9-0
(England) Alison Cumings	(Netherlands) Marjolein Houtsma	9-2 9-2 9-0
(South Africa) Donna Caldwell	(England) Carol Machin	9-0 9-1 9-0
(England) Angela Smith	(Republic of Ireland) Caroline Collins	9-0 9-4 9-3
(Republic of Ireland) Rebecca Best	(England) Linda Charman	9-1 5-9 9-0 9-3
(Australia) Liz Irving	(New Zealand) Robyn Hadfield	9-3 9-2 9-6
(England) Senga Macfie	(United States) Alicia McConnell	10-9 9-3 6-9 3-9 9-2
(Australia) Carol Kennewell	(Switzerland) Barbara Hartmann	9-6 9-1 9-3
(England) Liz Brown	(England) Samantha Langley	9-3 9-3 5-9 6-9 9-1
(Guernsey) Lisa Opie	(England) Joyce Tuomey	9-1 9-1 9-0
(England) Ruth Strauss	(England) Melanie Warren-Hawkes	9-6 6-9 2-9 9-7 9-7
(Australia) Danielle Drady	(Canada) Gail Pimm	9-1 9-3 9-3
(Australia) Cath Bellemore	(England) Flavia Roberts	9-6 9-4 9-2

=== Second round ===
Player one	Player two	Score
(New Zealand) Devoy	(Finland) Myllyniemi	9-5 9-4 9-1
(Scotland) Wallace	(England) Diggens	9-0 9-0 10-9
(England) Burgess	(Singapore) Seok Hui Lim	9-7 9-0 9-0
(Australia) Fitzgerald	(England) Geaves	
(Guernsey) Le Moignan	(Wales) Turnbull	9-0 9-1 9-0
(New Zealand) Williams	(England) Vardy	9-2 9-4 9-6
(Australia) Cardwell	(England) Wright	9-0 9-0 9-5
(Australia) Bradey	(Republic of Ireland) Burke	9-3 10-8 9-5
(England) Soutter	(England) Jackman	9-2 9-1 9-2
(Australia) Martin	(Australia) Reid	
(England) Cumings	(South Africa) Caldwell	9-4 3-9 9-1 9-1
(England) Smith	(Republic of Ireland) Best	9-1 5-9 6-9 9-4 9-4
(Australia) Irving	(England) Macfie	9-2 9-1 9-4
(Australia) Kennewell	(England) Brown	3-9 9-3 4-9 9-2 9-7
(Guernsey) Opie	(England) Strauss	9-4 9-1 9-1
(Australia) Drady	(Australia) Bellemore	9-2 9-5 9-6

=== Third round ===
Player one	Player two	Score
(New Zealand) Devoy	(Scotland) Wallace	3-9 9-3 9-5 9-2
(England) Burgess	(Australia) Fitzgerald	9-5 9-4 9-1
(Guernsey) Le Moignan	(New Zealand) Williams	9-6 9-5 9-4
(Australia) Cardwell	(Australia) Bradey	4-9 9-3 9-3 9-1
(England) Soutter	(Australia) Martin	9-1 9-1 9-0
(England) Cumings	(England) Smith	
(Australia) Irving	(Australia) Kennewell	9-6 9-0 5-9 4-9 9-3
(Guernsey) Opie	(Australia) Drady	9-1 9-4 9-2

=== Quarter-finals ===
Player one	Player two	Score
(New Zealand) Devoy	(England) Burgess	10-8 9-6 5-9 9-6
(Guernsey) Le Moignan	(Australia) Cardwell	9-3 2-9 10-8 3-0 ret
(England) Soutter	(England) Cumings	9-5 4-9 9-0 9-5
(Australia) Irving	(Guernsey) Opie	10-8 9-0 6-9 10-8

=== Semi-finals ===
Player one	Player two	Score
(New Zealand) Devoy	(Guernsey) Le Moignan	10-8 9-6 9-6
(England) Soutter	(Australia) Irving	9-1 6-9 9-1 9-0

=== Final ===
Player one	Player two	Score
(New Zealand) Devoy	(England) Soutter	2–9, 4–9, 9–4, 9–2, 9–1

Preceded by 1986	British Open Squash Championships; England (London); 1987	Succeeded by 1988
