= 1991 Women's British Open Squash Championship =

Hi-Tec British Open Squash Championships held in London in April 1991

British Open Squash Championships
- 63rd Women's British Open Championships

Details
- Location: London, England
- Venue: Lambs Squash Club & Wembley Conference Centre

The 1991 Hi-Tec British Open Squash Championships was held at the Lambs Squash Club with the later stages being held at the Wembley Conference Centre in London from 15–22 April 1991. The event was won by Lisa Opie who defeated Sue Wright in the final.

== Seeds ==
1. (New Zealand) Susan Devoy
2. (Guernsey) Lisa Opie
3. (Australia) Robyn Lambourne (née Friday)
4. (Guernsey) Martine Le Moignan
5. (Australia) Danielle Drady
6. (Australia) Liz Irving
7. (England) Jane Martin
8. (Australia) Michelle Martin

== Draw and results ==
=== Qualifying round ===
| Player One | Player Two | Score |
|---|---|---|
| (England) Rebecca Poole | (England) Senga Macfie | 9-0 9-7 7-9 9-2 |
| (England) Jackie Dimmock | (England) Helen Macfie | 9-7 7-9 9-2 9-3 |
| (England) Carolyn Mett | (New Zealand) Marie Pearson | 9-1 9-0 9-4 |
| (England) Samantha Langley | (Australia) Robyn Cooper | 9-5 9-6 9-5 |
| (United States) Demer Holleran | (England) Flavia Roberts | 9-2 9-1 9-4 |
| (England) Jane Martin | (Netherlands) Denise Sommers | 7-9 9-6 9-5 9-2 |
| (England) Rebecca Macree | (Brazil) Karen Redfern | 10-8 9-3 5-9 9-7 |
| (England) Linda Charman | (Germany) Andrea Holbe | 9-0 9-1 9-4 |

=== First round ===
| Player One | Player Two | Score |
|---|---|---|
| (Guernsey) Lisa Opie | | |
| (Canada) Heather Wallace | | |
| (England) Cassie Jackman | | |
| (Australia) Liz Irving | | |
| (Guernsey) Martine Le Moignan | (Hong Kong) Dawn Olsen | 9-0 9-2 9-2 |
| (England) Lucy Soutter | | |
| (England) Suzanne Horner (née Burgess) | (Finland) Tuula Myllyniemi | 9-6 9-4 9-4 |
| (England) Jane Martin | | |
| (England) Sue Wright | | |
(Australia) Michelle Martin
| (England) Susan Devoy | (Finland) Nina Taimiaho | 9-5 9-0 9-0 |
| (England) Alison Cumings | (United States) Demer Holleran | 9-4 6-9 9-5 9-5 |
| (Australia) Robyn Lambourne (née Friday) | | |
| (Australia) Sarah Fitzgerald | | |
| (Australia) Danielle Drady | | |
| (England) Fiona Geaves | | |

=== Second round ===
| Player One | Player Two | Score |
|---|---|---|
| (Guernsey) Opie | (Canada) Wallace | 9-5 9-4 9-3 |
| (England) Jackman | (Australia) Irving | 9-9 9-6 9-2 |
| (Guernsey) Le Moignan | (England) Soutter | 9-3 3-9 9-1 9-5 |
| (England) Horner | (England) Martin J | 9-4 9-5 9-1 |
| (England) Wright | (Australia) Martin M | 6-9 3-9 9-4 9-3 9-0 |
| (New Zealand) Devoy | (England) Cumings | 9-2 9-2 9-6 |
| (Australia) Lambourne | (Australia) Fitzgerald | 10-8 10-8 9-6 |
| (Australia) Drady | (England) Geaves | 9-0 9-0 9-1 |

=== Quarter finals ===
| Player One | Player Two | Score |
|---|---|---|
| (Guernsey) Opie | (England) Jackman | 3-9 9-1 9-4 8-10 9-0 |
| (Guernsey) Le Moignan | (England) Horner | 4-9 9-5 9-7 9-3 |
| (England) Wright | (New Zealand) Devoy | 4-9 10-9 9-1 9-2 |
| (Australia) Lambourne | (Australia) Drady | 7-9 9-2 9-7 2-9 9-2 |

=== Semi finals ===
| Player One | Player Two | Score |
|---|---|---|
| (Guernsey) Opie | (Guernsey) Le Moignan | 4-9 9-4 9-3 9-3 |
| (England) Wright | (Australia) Lambourne | 7-9 2-9 9-7 9-6 9-2 |

=== Final ===
| Player One | Player Two | Score |
|---|---|---|
| (Guernsey) Opie | (England) Wright | 6-9 9-3 9-3 9-4 |

| Preceded by 1990 | British Open Squash Championships; England (London); 1991 | Succeeded by 1992 |
