= 1992 Women's World Open Squash Championship =

Women's World Open 1992
- 9th WISPA World Squash Championship
- Location: Vancouver, British Columbia, Canada
- Date: October 4–10, 1992

WISPA World Tour
- Category: World Open
- Prize money: $35,000

Results
- Champion: (New Zealand) Susan Devoy
- Runner-up: (Australia) Michelle Martin
- Semi-finalists: (Guernsey) Martine Le Moignan (England) Cassie Jackman

The 1992 Women's Silver Unicorn World Open Squash Championship was the women's edition of the 1992 World Open, which serves as the individual world championship for squash players. The event took place in Vancouver in Canada between 4 October and 10 October 1992. Susan Devoy won her fourth World Open title, defeating Michelle Martin in the final.

== Seeds ==
1. (New Zealand) Susan Devoy (champion)
2. (Guernsey) Martine Le Moignan (semifinals)
3. (Australia) Michelle Martin (final)
4. (England) Cassie Jackman (semifinals)
5. (Australia) Robyn Lambourne (née Friday) (quarterfinals)
6. (Australia) Danielle Drady (second round)
7. (Australia) Liz Irving (third round)
8. (England) Sue Wright (quarterfinals)

== Draw and results ==
=== Finals ===
Quarterfinals
1	(New Zealand) Susan Devoy	9	9	10
5	(Australia) Robyn Lambourne	3	4	8
4	(England) Cassie Jackman	6	9	9	10
8	(England) Sue Wright	9	6	2	8
3	(Australia) Michelle Martin	9	9	9
(England) Suzanne Horner	6	5	7
(Canada) Heather Wallace	6	5	8
2	(Guernsey) Martine Le Moignan	9	9	10

Semifinals
1	(New Zealand) Susan Devoy	9	4	9	9
4	(England) Cassie Jackman	0	9	0	0
3	(Australia) Michelle Martin	9	9	9
2	(Guernsey) Martine Le Moignan	2	1	4

Final
1	(New Zealand) Susan Devoy	9	9	9
3	(Australia) Michelle Martin	4	6	4

=== Top half ===
==== Section 1 ====
First Round
1	(New Zealand) Susan Devoy	9	9	9
(Germany) Sabine Baum	0	1	3
(South Africa) Claire Nitch	9	9	9
(Canada) Melanie Jans	4	5	2
(England) Lisa Opie	9	9	9
(Sweden) Eva Svenby	2	0	1
(Finland) Nina Taimiaho	2	9	8	9	9
(Canada) Barbara Diggens	9	4	10	6	5
5	(Australia) Robyn Lambourne	9	9	9
(Canada) A Humble	0	2	1
(Netherlands) Denise Sommers	9	9	9
(United States) Karen Kelso	1	1	2
(Scotland) Senga Macfie	9	9	9
(New Zealand) Philippa Beams	1	5	1
13	(Republic of Ireland) Rebecca O'Callaghan (née Best)	9	9	9
(Scotland) Helen Macfie	0	0	1

Second Round
1	(New Zealand) Devoy	9	9	9
(South Africa) Nitch	6	2	4
(Guernsey) Opie	9	9	9
(Finland) Taimiaho	1	2	4
5	(Australia) Lambourne	9	9	9
(Netherlands) Sommers	6	5	3
(Scotland) Macfie	9	9	9
13	(Republic of Ireland) O'Callaghan	4	5	0

Third Round
1	(New Zealand) Devoy	9	9	9
(Guernsey) Opie	5	6	5
5	(Australia) Lambourne	9	9	9
(Scotland) Macfie	1	5	1

Fourth Round
1	(New Zealand) Devoy	9	9	10
5	(Australia) Lambourne	3	4	8

==== Section 2 ====
First Round
4	(England) Cassie Jackman	9	9	9
(United States) Zerline Goodman	1	1	0
(England) Linda Charman	9	9	9
(India) Misha Grewal	0	0	1
(Germany) Sabine Schöne	10	7	9	9
(Scotland) Alison Bowie	8	9	4	5
(Netherlands) Hugoline van Hoorn	3	9	9	9
(Scotland) Shirley Brown	9	1	2	5
8	(England) Sue Wright	9	9	9
(Denmark) Elsebeth Jensen	1	0	0
(Australia) Carol Owens	9	9	9
(Finland) Mia Markkanen	3	0	2
(Finland) Tuula Myllyniemi	9	9	9
(Canada) Sandy McBean	2	1	0
(Germany) Daniela Grzenia	9	9	9
(Brazil) Adriana Moura	5	7	8

Second Round
4	(England) Jackman	9	9	9
(England) Charman	2	1	2
(Germany) Schoene	10	9	7	9
(Netherlands) van Hoorn	8	2	9	3
8	(England) Wright	9	9	9
(Australia) Owens	4	6	5
(Finland) Myllyniemi	6	9	9	9
(Germany) Grzenia	9	6	5	2

Third Round
4	(England) Jackman	9	9	9
(Germany) Schoene	3	3	3
8	(England) Wright	9	9	3	9
(Finland) Myllyniemi	4	6	9	4

Fourth Round
4	(England) Jackman	6	9	9	10
(England) Wright	9	6	2	8

=== Bottom half ===
==== Section 3 ====
First Round
3	(Australia) Michelle Martin	9	9	9
(United States) Berkeley Belknap	0	2	1
(Australia) Toni Weeks	7	9	2	9	9
(Republic of Ireland) Brona Ringland (née Conway)	9	1	9	4	5
(Australia) Sharon Bradey	9	9	9
(United States) Ellie Pierce	4	0	2
(England) Jane Martin	6	9	9	9
(South Africa) Thelma Holt	9	0	5	6
(England) Suzanne Horner	9	9	9
(France) Corinne Castets	2	1	0
(New Zealand) Donna Newton	9	9	9
(Netherlands) Heskia Dil	0	0	0
7	(Australia) Liz Irving	9	9	9
(Singapore) Mah Li Lian	0	6	1
(England) Rebecca Macree	9	9	9
(Austria) Pamela Pancis	4	0	2

Second Round
3	(Australia) Martin	9	9	9
(Australia) Weeks	0	1	0
(Australia) Bradey	9	9	9
(England) Martin J	6	6	3
(England) Horner	9	9	9
(New Zealand) Newton	3	4	0
7	(Australia) Irving	9	9	9
(England) Macree	1	1	1

Third Round
3	(Australia) Martin	9	9	9
(Australia) Bradey	7	5	0
(England) Horner	9	9	9
7	(Australia) Irving	0	6	5

Fourth Round
3	(Australia) Martin M	9	9	9
(England) Horner	6	5	7

==== Section 4 ====
First Round
2	(Guernsey) Martine Le Moignan	9	9	9
(New Zealand) Marie Pearson	1	1	6
(Australia) Vicki Cardwell	9	9	9
(South Africa) Chantel Clifton-Parks	3	7	6
(Australia) Sarah Fitzgerald	9	9	9
(Malaysia) Sandra Wu	3	1	0
(United States) Demer Holleran	9	9	9
(Australia) Meeghan Bell	6	4	7
(Canada) Heather Wallace	9	9	9
(Brazil) Karen Redfern	1	5	4
(Netherlands) Nicole Beumer	9	9	9
(Scotland) Emma Donaldson	2	0	1
(England) Fiona Geaves	9	9	9
(Japan) Miyuki Adachi	0	0	1
6	(Australia) Danielle Drady	9	9	9
(Netherlands) Marjolein Houtsma	4	1	5

Second Round
2	(Guernsey) Le Moignan	9	9	9
(Australia) Cardwell	6	2	4
(Australia) Fitzgerald	9	9	9
(United States) Holleran	3	0	0
(Canada) Wallace	9	9	9	9
(Netherlands) Beumer	10	2	5	0
(England) Geaves	10	10	9
6	(Australia) Drady-Harte	8	8	3

Third Round
2	(Guernsey) Le Moignan	9	9	9
(Australia) Fitzgerald	6	1	1
(Canada) Wallace	9	9	9
(England) Geaves	6	1	5

Fourth Round
2	(Guernsey) Le Moignan	9	9	10
(Canada) Wallace	6	5	8

=== Notes ===
Susan Devoy retired in 1992 after a career that saw four World Open successes and eight British Open titles.

== See also ==
- World Open
- 1992 Men's World Open Squash Championship

Preceded by Sydney (Australia); 1990	World Open; Canada (Vancouver); 1992	Succeeded by Johannesburg (South Africa); 1993
