= 1988 Women's British Open Squash Championship =

British Open Squash Championships
- 60th Women's British Open Championships

Details
- Location: London, England
- Venue: Wembley

The 1988 Hi-Tec British Open Squash Championships was held at Wembley in London from 13–18 April 1988. The event was won for the fifth consecutive year by Susan Devoy who defeated Liz Irving in the final.

== Seeds ==
1. (New Zealand) Susan Devoy
2. (Guernsey) Lisa Opie
3. (England) Lucy Soutter
4. (Australia) Liz Irving
5. (Guernsey) Martine Le Moignan
6. (England) Alison Cumings
7. (Australia) Vicki Cardwell (née Hoffman)
8. (Australia) Robyn Lambourne (née Friday)
9. (Australia) Michelle Martin
10. (Australia) Sarah Fitzgerald
11. (Republic of Ireland) Rebecca Best
12. (Australia) Danielle Drady
13. (England) Fiona Geaves
14. (Australia) Sharon Bradey
15. (England) Angela Smith
16. (United States) Alicia McConnell

== Draw and results ==
=== Qualifying round ===
Player one	Player two	Score
(England) Samantha Langley-Foster	(Netherlands) Nicole Beumer	6-9 9-5 1-9 9-5 9-2
(England) Sue Wright	(Netherlands) Hugoline Van Hoorn	9-6 4-9 9-4 9-4
(England) Cassie Jackman	(England) Alison Rix	9-4 9-4 9-4
(Australia) Robyn Belford	(England) Jane Parker	9-0 10-8 9-0
(England) Melissa Fryer	(England) Carol Machin	9-3 9-4 9-1
(England) Annette Pilling	(England) Linda Charman	9-3 9-7 9-6
(England) Jeanine Leatherbarrow	(England) Helen MacFie	10-8 9-1 9-4
(South Africa) Renee Aucamp	(England) Rachel Marriott	9-0 9-6 9-1

=== First round ===
Player one	Player two	Score
(New Zealand) Susan Devoy	(Republic of Ireland) Marjorie Burke	9-4 9-1 9-7
(Guernsey) Lisa Opie	(England) Jeanine Leatherbarrow	9-4 9-6 9-0
(England) Lucy Soutter	(England) Ruth Strauss	9-2 9-0 9-0
(Australia) Liz Irving	(Australia) Rae Anderson	9-4 9-0 9-3
(Guernsey) Martine Le Moignan	(England) Annette Pilling	9-4 9-0 9-3
(England) Alison Cumings	(Australia) Robyn Belford	9-3 9-4 9-2
(Australia) Vicki Cardwell (née Hoffman)	(South Africa) Renee Aucamp	9-1 9- 19-5
(Australia) Robyn Lambourne (née Friday)	(England) Sue Wright	9-2 9-5 9-5
(Australia) Michelle Martin	(England) Cassie Jackman	9-3 9-7 2-9 9-3
(Australia) Sarah Fitzgerald	(Netherlands) Babette Hoogendoorn	9-0 9-1 9-6
(Republic of Ireland) Rebecca Best	(England) Samantha Langley-Foster	9-0 9-4 9-5
(Australia) Danielle Drady	(Finland) Tuula Myllyniemi	9-3 9-4 9-5
(England) Fiona Geaves	(England) Melanie Warren-Hawkes	9-1 6-9 9-4 9-5
(Australia) Sharon Bradey	(England) Donna Vardy	9-0 9-6 9-4
(England) Flavia Roberts	(England) Angela Smith	9-4 8-10 9-2 9-5
(England) Melissa Fryer	(United States) Alicia McConnell	7-9 9-2 9-4 9-10 9-4

=== Second round ===
Player one	Player two	Score
(New Zealand) Devoy	(Republic of Ireland) Best	9-4 9-1 9-7
(Australia) Fitzgerald	(Australia) Lambourne	10-8 10-8 9-0
(England) Soutter	(Australia) Martin	9-2 9-2 10-9
(England) Cumings	(Australia) Bradey	9-6 9-0 9-4
(Australia) Irving	(England) Fryer	9-0 9-0 9-2
(Australia) Cardwell	(England) Roberts	9 2 9-2 9-2
(Guernsey) Le Moignan	(England) Geaves	9-1 9-1 9-2
(Guernsey) Opie	(Australia) Drady	9-6 9-0 9-5

=== Quarter-finals ===
Player one	Player two	Score
(New Zealand) Devoy	(Australia) Fitzgerald	9-5 9-6 9-6
(England) Soutter	(England) Cumings	9-3 9-4 9-2
(Australia) Irving	(Australia) Cardwell	9-5 5-9 9-2 9-5
(Guernsey) Le Moignan	(Guernsey) Opie	9-6 9-1 4-9 9-7

=== Semi-finals ===
Player one	Player two	Score
(New Zealand) Devoy	(England) Soutter	2-9 7-9 9-5 10-8 9-5
(Australia) Irving	(Guernsey) Le Moignan	6-9 9-2 4-9 9-7 9-7

=== Final ===
Player one	Player two	Score
(New Zealand) Devoy	(Australia) Irving	9-7 9-5 9-1

Preceded by 1987	British Open Squash Championships; England (London); 1988	Succeeded by 1989
