= 1989 Women's British Open Squash Championship =

British Open Squash Championships
- 61st Women's British Open Championships

Details
- Location: London, England
- Venue: Lambs Squash Club & Wembley Conference Centre

The 1989 Hi-Tec Women's British Open Squash Championships was held at East Grinstead and the Wembley Squash Centre in London from 12–17 April 1989. Susan Devoy won her sixth consecutive title defeating Martine Le Moignan in the final.

== Seeds ==
1. (New Zealand) Susan Devoy
2. (Guernsey) Lisa Opie
3. (Guernsey) Martine Le Moignan
4. (Australia) Liz Irving
5. (Australia) Robyn Lambourne (née Friday)
6. (England) Alison Cumings
7. (Australia) Michelle Martin
8. (Republic of Ireland) Rebecca Best
9. (New Zealand) Joanne Williams
10. (England) Lucy Soutter
11. (Australia) Danielle Drady
12. (Australia) Sarah Fitzgerald
13. (England) Fiona Geaves
14. (Australia) Robyn Belford
15. (Australia) Sharon Bradey
16. (Netherlands) Babette Hoogendoorn

== Draw and results ==
=== First round ===
Player one	Player two	Score
(England) Jane Parker	(Netherlands) Hugoline Van Hoorn	9-6 9-4 9-3
(England) Angela Smith	(England) Linda Charman	9-0 9-5 9-1
(United States) Alicia McConnell	(England) Ruth Strauss	9-7 6-9 9-0 9-5
(Australia) Susan Carter	(England) Samantha Langley-Foster	3-9 10-8 9-4 9-6
(England) Jane Martin	(England) Melissa Fryer	9-6 9-5 5-9 9-5
(England) Cassie Jackman	(West Germany) Beate Muller	9-5 4-9 9-10 9-1
(England) Carolyn Mett	(Scotland) Shirley Brown	9-5 9-2 9-3
(England) Liz Brown	(England) Annette Pilling	9-3 9-1 9-4

=== Second round ===
Player one	Player two	Score
(New Zealand) Susan Devoy	(West Germany) Andrea Holbe	9-3 9-1 9-1
(Guernsey) Lisa Opie	(England) Liz Brown	9-3 9-5 9-1
(Guernsey) Martine Le Moignan	(West Germany) Sabine Schoene	9-3 9-3 9-2
(Australia) Liz Irving	(United States) Alicia McConnell	9-3 9-7 9-4
(Australia) Robyn Lambourne (née Friday)	(England) Flavia Roberts	9-5 9-6 9-0
(England) Alison Cumings	(Australia) Rae Anderson	9-6 9-3 9-2
(Australia) Michelle Martin	(England) Jane Martin	9-5 9-0 10-8
(Republic of Ireland) Rebecca Best	(Australia) Susan Carter	9-2 9-1 9-4
(New Zealand) Joanne Williams	(England) Suzanne Horner (née Burgess)	3-9 4-9 1-9
(England) Lucy Soutter	(Australia) Vicki Cardwell (née Hoffman)	9-6 5-9 9-6 9-5
(Australia) Danielle Drady	(England) Carolyn Mett	9-2 9-2 9-1
(Australia) Sarah Fitzgerald	(England) Sue Wright	9-1 9-7 9-0
(England) Fiona Geaves	(England) Angela Smith	9-5 9-5 9-5
(Australia) Robyn Belford	(England) Cassie Jackman	8-10 0-9 1-9
(Australia) Sharon Bradey	(England) Jane Parker	9-4 7-9 9-6 9-1
(Netherlands) Babette Hoogendoorn	(Finland) Tuula Myllyniemi	9-6 9-4 9-4

=== Third round ===
Player one	Player two	Score
(New Zealand) Devoy	(Australia) Bradey	9-4 9-2 10-8
(Guernsey) Opie	(Australia) Fitzgerald	1-9 7-9 0-9
(Guernsey) Le Moignan	(England) Jackman	9-0 9-1 9-6
(Australia) Irving	(England) Soutter	9-2 9-5 9-3
(Australia) Lambourne	(England) Geaves	9-3 9-2 10-9
(England) Cumings	(Australia) Drady	7-9 2-9 7-9
(Australia) Martin	(England) Horner	9-2 9-2 9-7
(Republic of Ireland) Best	(Netherlands) Hoogendoorn	9-2 9-5 9-5

=== Quarter-finals ===
Player one	Player two	Score
(New Zealand) Devoy	(Australia) Lambourne	9-6 9-1 9-1
(Guernsey) Le Moignan	(Australia) Martin	9-3 9-4 9-2
(Australia) Irving	(Republic of Ireland) Best	9-6 9-2 9-5
(Australia) Drady	(Australia) Fitzgerald	9-6 9-1 9-5

=== Semi-finals ===
Player one	Player two	Score
(New Zealand) Devoy	(Australia) Irving	9-4 9-7 3-9 9-2
(Guernsey) Le Moignan	(Australia) Drady	4-9 9-6 9-7 9-5

=== Final ===
Player one	Player two	Score
(New Zealand) Devoy	(Guernsey) Le Moignan	8-10 10-8 9-3 9-6

Preceded by 1988	British Open Squash Championships; England (London); 1989	Succeeded by 1990
