= 1990 Women's World Open Squash Championship =

Women's World Open 1990
- 8th WISPA World Squash Championship
- Location: Sydney, Australia
- Date: October 7–14, 1990

WISPA World Tour
- Category: World Open

Results
- Champion: (New Zealand) Susan Devoy
- Runner-up: (Guernsey) Martine Le Moignan
- Semi-finalists: (Australia) Danielle Drady (Australia) Robyn Lambourne

The 1990 Mazda Women's World Open Squash Championship was the women's edition of the 1990 World Open, which serves as the individual world championship for squash players. The early stages of the event took place at the Thornleigh Squash Centre with the quarter-finals onwards being held at the Homebush Sports Centre in Sydney, Australia between 7 October and 14 October 1990. Susan Devoy won her third World Open title, defeating Martine Le Moignan in the final.

== Seeds ==
1. (New Zealand) Susan Devoy (champion)
2. (Guernsey) Lisa Opie (quarterfinals)
3. (Australia) Danielle Drady (semifinals)
4. (Guernsey) Martine Le Moignan (final)
5. (Australia) Robyn Lambourne née Friday (semifinals)
6. (Australia) Liz Irving (quarterfinals)
7. (Australia) Michelle Martin (quarterfinals)
8. (England) Suzanne Horner née Burgess (quarterfinals)
9. (Australia) Sarah Fitzgerald (fourth round)
10. (Republic of Ireland) Rebecca Best (fourth round)
11. (England) Fiona Geaves (third round)
12. (England) Lucy Soutter (fourth round)
13. (Canada) Heather Wallace (fourth round)
14. (New Zealand) Joanne Williams (fourth round)
15. (England) Sue Wright (fourth round)
16. (Australia) Sharon Bradey (fourth round)

== First round ==
Player One	Player Two	Score
(Australia) Nikke Solan	(Malaysia) Koh Yoke Keet	9-1 9-0 9-1
(Australia) Julie Eldridge	(Australia) Cherylee Langford	9-7 9-7 9-0
(Australia) Shannon McNamara	(Republic of Ireland) Brona Conway	9-7 3-9 10-8 9-5
(United States) Demer Holleran	(Australia) Johanna Armstrong	9-1 9-0 9-2
(Australia) Robyn Cooper	(New Zealand) Jennifer Bell	10-8 9-5 9-1
(Canada) Amanda Paton	(Australia) Sue Hannigan	9-3 9-2 9-2
(Germany) Sabine Schoene	(Australia) Jacki McNamara	9-0 9-6 9-2
(Australia) Hilary King	(Finland) Minna Sinervo	9-4 9-5 9-6
(Switzerland) Martina Donatsch	(Australia) Judy Ryan	3-9 9-7 9-0 9-6
(Germany) Daniela Grzenia	(New Zealand) Nita Pearson	9-2 9-3 9-7
(Australia) Jackie Rutherford	(Canada) Lori Coleman	4-9 10-8 9-1 -6
(Sweden) Lotta Olsson	(Australia) Bev Waugh	7-9 7-9 9-2 9-4 9-4
(Germany) Andrea Holbe	(Australia) Ann McLauchlain	9-0 9-0 9-2
(South Africa) Claire Nitch	(Australia) Barbara McNamara	9-0 9-0 9-0
(New Zealand) Marie Pearson	(Australia) Nisha Casey	2-9 9-1 9-2 9-7
(United States) Alicia McConnell	(Australia) Di Hesaltine	9-2 9-2 9-6
(Switzerland) Barbara Hartmann	(Republic of Ireland) Orla O'Doherty	9-1 9-2 6-9 9-3
(Netherlands) Nicole Beumer	(England) Samantha Langley	4-9 8-10 9-2 9-4 9-5
(Netherlands) Hugoline Van Hoorn	(Australia) Sue Pilgrim	9-0 9-0 9-0
(Finland) Tuula Myllyniemi	(New Zealand) Kay Collins	9-5 9-3 9-2
(Sweden) Christine Walker-Anderson	(Australia) Lindy Varjavandi	9-6 9-2 9-5
(Singapore) Mah Li Lian	(United States) Julieanne Harris	9-4 7-9 9-7 9-7
(Germany) Beate Müller	(Canada) Shelley Harvey	9-4 9-5 9-0
(Switzerland) Tanja Sussmeier	(Malaysia) Wai Li Choong	9-2 9-0 9-4
(Canada) Heather Wallace	(Australia) Darrienne Smith	9-0 9-0 9-0
(France) Britta Gode	(Australia) Frances Lyneham	3-9 9-2 9-4 9-5
(Japan) Miyuki Adachi	(Australia) Carolyn Lozier	9-7 9-3 9-4
(Australia) Sue Doherty	(France) Nathalie Cornet	9-5 9-2 9-4
(United States) Shabana Khan	(Sweden) Eva Svenby	
(Scotland) Shirley Brown	(New Zealand) Angela Toal	1-9 8-10 9-5 9-0 9-7
(Australia) Vicky Cardwell	(Malaysia) Sandra Wu	9-0 9-1 9-1
(Australia) Kellie Cusheri	(Sri Lanka) Niloufer Phillis-Arakasuma	9-0 9-0 9-0
(New Zealand) Philippa Beams	(Netherlands) Marjolein Houtsma	8-10 9-6 9-2 5-9 9-1
(Republic of Ireland) Jill McCaughey	(Australia) Shelly Kadwell	10-8 9-2 9-7
(Republic of Ireland) Marjorie Croke (née Burke)	(Australia) Joanne Beckworth	9-1 9-7 9-1
(Finland) Nina Taimiaho	(Australia) Julie Belsham	9-0 9-0 9-0
(Australia) Sarah Nelson	(Sweden) Helene Tamfeldt	9-2 6-9 9-6 9-1
(New Zealand) Donna Newton	(Australia) Rona Richmond	9-4 9-0 9-0
(France) Corinne Castets	(United States) Ellie Pierce	9-1 9-1 9-5
(Australia) Carin Clonda	(Australia) Terri Bell	9-5 9-4 9-0
(Australia) Susan Carter	(Malaysia) Mary Lee	9-3 9-4 9-1
(Australia) Sharon Bradey	(Australia) Vanessa Bennett	9-2 9-1 9-1
(Sweden) Susanne Nyberg	(Australia) Bronwyn Johnstone	9-3 9-4 9-4
(Australia) Liz Spielman	(France) Corrine Vezine	9-10 9-4 9-4 8-10 9-0
(Republic of Ireland) Rebecca Best	(Australia) Maryanne Bodico	9-2 9-2 9-1
(England) Fiona Geaves	(Australia) Frances Baker	9-0 9-1 9-1
(England) Lucy Soutter	(Australia) Ann Gleason	9-4 9-0 9-4
(England) Sue Wright	(Australia) Christine Mitchell	9-2 9-0 9-0

== Second round ==
Player One	Player Two	Score
(Guernsey) Lisa Opie	(Australia) Hilary King	9-3 9-2 9-0
(Australia) Danielle Drady	(Republic of Ireland) Marjorie Croke (née Burke)	9-0 9-0 9-1
(Guernsey) Martine Le Moignan	(Sweden) Christine Walker-Anderson	9-0 9-1 9-0
(England) Suzanne Horner	(United States) Alicia McConnell	9-1 9-0 9-0
(Republic of Ireland) Rebecca Best	(Australia) Kim Johnstone	9-7 9-0 9-5
(England) Fiona Geaves	(Australia) Allison Stapleford	9-0 9-0 9-1
(England) Lucy Soutter	(Switzerland) Martina Donatsch	9-1 9-1 9-0
(Australia) Sue Wright	(Australia) Kellie Crusheri	9-3 9-4 9-4
(Australia) Shabana Khan	(Scotland) Shirley Brown	2-9 9-5 9-2 10-8
(Australia) Vicki Cardwell	(New Zealand) Marie Pearson	9-5 9-3 9-5

== Third round to final ==
Third round
1	(New Zealand) Susan Devoy	9	9	9
(Germany) Andrea Holbe	3	3	3
(South Africa) Claire Nitch	5	9	2	9	9
11	(England) Fiona Geaves	9	7	9	3	2
6	(Australia) Liz Irving	9	9	9
(United States) Shabana Khan	2	2	1
15	(England) Sue Wright	9	9	9
(New Zealand) Philippa Beams	5	0	2
3	(Australia) Danielle Drady	9	9	9
(Finland) Nina Taimiaho	0	0	3
12	(England) Lucy Soutter	9	9	9
(Australia) Donna Newton	0	0	5
7	(Australia) Michelle Martin	9	6	9	9
(Australia) Susan Carter	2	9	4	4
16	(Australia) Sharon Bradey	9	9	9
(Germany) Daniela Grzenia	5	6	3
5	(Australia) Robyn Lambourne	9	9	9
(Australia) Nikke Solan	6	6	3
13	(Canada) Heather Wallace	9	9	9
(Singapore) Mah Li Lian	1	4	0
2	(Guernsey) Lisa Opie	9	9	9
(Germany) Sabine Schoene	1	0	2
9	(Australia) Sarah Fitzgerald	9	9	9
(Australia) Shannon McNamara	0	1	0
4	(Guernsey) Martine Le Moignan	9	9	9
(Finland) Tuula Myllyniemi	4	1	2
14	(New Zealand) Joanne Williams	9	9	1	4	9
(Netherlands) Nicole Beumer	6	3	9	9	5
8	(England) Suzanne Horner	6	9	9	9
(Australia) Vicki Cardwell	9	2	2	4
10	(Republic of Ireland) Rebecca Best	9	9	9
(Australia) Elizabeth Spielman	5	1	1

Fourth round
1	(New Zealand) Devoy	9	9	9
(South Africa) Nitch	5	4	4
6	(Australia) Irving	9	10	9
15	(England) Wright	5	8	0
3	(Australia) Drady	9	9	9
12	(England) Soutter	1	6	2
7	(Australia) Martin	9	9	9
16	(Australia) Bradey	6	3	7
5	(Australia) Lambourne	9	10	9
13	(Canada) Wallace	1	9	6
2	(Guernsey) Opie	8	10	8	9	9
9	(Australia) Fitzgerald	10	8	10	5	3
4	(Guernsey) Le Moignan	9	9	9
14	(New Zealand) Williams	0	1	2
8	(England) Horner	9	6	10	1	9
10	(Republic of Ireland) Best	2	9	8	9	2

Quarter-finals
1	(New Zealand) Devoy	3	7	9	9	9
6	(Australia) Irving	9	9	2	3	2
3	(Australia) Drady	6	9	9	9
7	(Australia) Martin	9	7	5	4
5	(Australia) Lambourne	10	10	4	7	9
2	(Guernsey) Opie	9	9	9	9	7
4	(Guernsey) Le Moignan	9	9	2	9
8	(England) Horner	3	4	9	1

Semi-finals
1	(New Zealand) Devoy	9	9	9
3	(Australia) Drady	4	3	2
Final
1	(New Zealand) Devoy	9	9	9
4	(Guernsey) Le Moignan	4	4	4
5	(Australia) Lambourne	9	0	9	5	9
4	(Guernsey) Le Moignan	4	9	5	9	10

== See also ==
- World Open
- 1990 Men's World Open Squash Championship

=== Notes ===
The early rounds of the championship were held at the Thornleigh Squash Centre with the quarter-finals, semi-finals and final played at the Homebush Sports Centre. The tournament had the largest ever entry for a world championship with 121 players entered.

Preceded by Warmond (Netherlands); 1989	World Open; Australia (Sydney); 1990	Succeeded by Vancouver (Canada); 1992
