= 1986 Women's British Open Squash Championship =

British Open Squash Championships
- 58th Women's British Open Championships

Details
- Location: London, England
- Venue: East Grinstead & Wembley
- Dates: 14–22 April 1986

The 1986 Hi-Tec Women's British Open Squash Championships was held at East Grinstead and the Wembley Squash Centre in London from 14–22 April 1986. Susan Devoy won her third consecutive title defeating Lisa Opie in the final.

== Seeds ==
1. (New Zealand) Susan Devoy
2. (England) Lucy Soutter
3. (Guernsey) Lisa Opie
4. (Guernsey) Martine Le Moignan
5. (Scotland) Heather Wallace
6. (England) Alison Cumings
7. (Australia) Liz Irving
8. (England) Suzanne Burgess
9. (England) Angela Smith
10. (Australia) Carin Clonda
11. (Australia) Tracey Smith
12. (Australia) Vicki Cardwell
13. (Australia) Robyn Friday
14. (Australia) Rae Anderson
15. (Australia) Carol Kennewell
16. (New Zealand) Donna Gurran

== Draw and results ==
=== First round ===
Player one	Player two	Score
(New Zealand) Susan Devoy	(England) Sue Wright	9-1 9-0 9-1
(England) Lucy Soutter	(England) Rachael Taylor	9-5 9-0 9-1
(Guernsey) Lisa Opie	(England) Keera Scanlan	9-0 9-0 9-1
(Guernsey) Martine Le Moignan	(Scotland) Joyce Leach	9-2 9-1 9-0
(Scotland) Heather Wallace	(England) Samantha Langley	9-1 9-3 9-1
(England) Alison Cumings	(England) Janet Partington	9-0 9-0 9-2
(Australia) Liz Irving	(England) Carol Foulkes	9-0 9-2 9-6
(England) Suzanne Burgess	(England) Heather Rutt	9-3 9-3 9-5
(England) Angela Smith	(England) Paula Anderson	9-1 9-4 0-9 9-7
(Australia) Carin Clonda	(England) Frances Candy	9-3 9-0 9-7
(Australia) Tracey Smith	(England) Sarah Stone	9-6 9-0 9-2
(Australia) Vicki Cardwell	(England) Sandra James	9-1 9-0 9-1
(Australia) Robyn Friday	(England) Wendy Cole	9-1 9-2 9-2
(Australia) Rae Anderson	(England) Carol Machin	10-8 9-6 9-2
(Australia) Carol Kennewell	(England) Wendy Berry	9-0 9-2 9-7
(New Zealand) Donna Gurran	(England) Joyce Tuomey	9-5 9-1 9-0
(England) Melanie Warren-Hawkes	(England) Lesley Moore	9-0 9-7 9-1
(England) Liz Brown	(England) Janice Cook	7-9 9-1 9-1 9-3
(England) Karen Butterworth	(Finland) Tuula Myllyniemi	9-6 9-4 3-9 8-10 9-3
(England) Barbara Diggens	(Republic of Ireland) Barbara Lowans	9-0 9-3 6-9 9-3
(England) Claire Oxley	(Jamaica) Susan Lawrence	9-1 9-3 9-3
(England) Senga Macfie	(England) Pauline Nicholl	9-4 7-9 9-7 9-6
(Australia) Mary Jo Reid	(England) Annette Pilling	9-6 10-8 9-4
(England) Ruth Strauss	(Wales) Deanna Murray	9-1 9-3 9-1
(Republic of Ireland) Rebecca Best	(Belgium) Noel Tracey	10-8 9-2 6-9 9-3
(Republic of Ireland) Marjorie Burke	(England) Flavia Roberts	9-3 2-9 9-2 9-2
(England) Alex Cowie	(England) Jane Reeves	9-2 9-3 9-1
(South Africa) Donna Caldwell	(England) Sandra Wrench	9-3 9-2 9-5
(England) Fiona Geaves	(England) S Burfoot	9-1 9-5 9-1
(Australia) Michelle Toon	(Sweden) Susanne Nyberg	9-1 9-2 9-3
(England) Jill Benfield	(England) Sheila White	9-1 9-7 9-4
(Australia) Sharon Bradey	(England) Claire Candy	9-1 9-0 9-2

=== Second round ===
Player one	Player two	Score
(New Zealand) Devoy	(England) Warren-Hawkes	9-4 9-0 9-7
(England) Soutter	(England) Benfield	9-0 9-2 9-0
(Guernsey) Opie	(Australia) Caldwell	9-1 9-1 9-6
(Guernsey) Le Moignan	(England) Oxley	9-3 9-0 9-3
(Scotland) Wallace	(Australia) Reid	9-3 9-2 9-1
(England) Cumings	(Republic of Ireland) Burke	9-0 9-6 9-3
(Australia) Irving	(England) Geaves	9-3 9-2 9-6
(England) Burgess	(England) Butterworth	9-1 9-2 9-1
(England) Smith A	(England) Strauss	9-5 8-10 9-2 5-9 5-9
(Australia) Clonda	(England) Macfie	2-9 8-10 6-9
(Australia) Smith T	(Australia) Bradey	9-7 4-9 9-1 9-4
(Australia) Cardwell	(Australia) Troon	9-0 9-0 9-1
(Australia) Friday	(England) Diggens	9-4 9-5 9-1
(Australia) Anderson	(England) Brown	10-8 5-9 10-8 1-9 6-9
(Australia) Kennewell	(Republic of Ireland) Best	9-2 9-6 3-9 9-5
(New Zealand) Gurran	(England) Cowie	9-2 9-3 0-9 8-10 9-3

=== Third round ===
Player one	Player two	Score
(New Zealand) Devoy	(England) Brown	9-3 9-4 9-1
(England) Soutter	(Australia) Cardwell	9-7 9-7 9-6
(Guernsey) Opie	(New Zealand) Gurran	9-2 9-0 9-5
(Guernsey) Le Moignan	(England) Macfie	9-2 9-3 9-2
(Scotland) Wallace	(England) Strauss	9-0 9-7 9-3
(England) Cumings	(Australia) Kennewell	9-5 7-9 9-0 9-0
(Australia) Irving	(Australia) Smith T	9-1 5-9 9-1 9-6
(England) Burgess	(Australia) Friday	9-7 9-3 9-5

=== Quarter-finals ===
Player one	Player two	Score
(New Zealand) Devoy	(England) Burgess	9-4 9-0 9-0
(England) Soutter	(Australia) Irving	9-4 3-9 10-8 9-1
(Guernsey) Opie	(England) Cumings	9-2 8-10 10-8 9-7
(Guernsey) Le Moignan	(Scotland) Wallace	10-8 9-3 9-7

=== Semi-finals ===
Player one	Player two	Score
(New Zealand) Devoy	(Guernsey) Le Moignan	9-6 10-8 9-3
(England) Soutter	(Guernsey) Opie	9-5 10-9 1-9 3-9 2-9

=== Final ===
Player one	Player two	Score
(New Zealand) Devoy	(Guernsey) Opie	9-4 9-2 9-3

Preceded by 1985	British Open Squash Championships; England (London); 1986	Succeeded by 1987
