= 1992 Women's World Team Squash Championships =

Women's World Team 1992
- 8th World Women's Team Championship
- Location: Vancouver, British Columbia, Canada
- Date: October 12–17, 1992

Results
- Champions: Australia
- Runners-up: New Zealand
- Third place: England

The 1992 Women's Silver Unicorn World Team Squash Championships were held in Vancouver, British Columbia, Canada and took place from 12 to 17 October 1992.

== First round ==
=== Pool A ===
Date	Team One	Team Two	Score
Oct 12	(Republic of Ireland) Ireland	Canada	1-2
Oct 13	England	Germany	3-0
Oct 14	England	(Republic of Ireland) Ireland	2-1
Oct 14	Germany	Canada	2-1
Oct 15	England	Canada	3-0
Oct 15	(Republic of Ireland) Ireland	Germany	1-2

Pos	Nation	Team	P	W	L	Pts
1	England	Martine Le Moignan, Lisa Opie, Sue Wright, Cassie Jackman	3	3	0	6
2	Germany	Sabine Schöne, Daniela Grzenia, Sandy Suck, Sabine Baum	3	2	1	4
3	Canada	Heather Wallace, Melanie Jans, Sandy McBean, Amanda Paton-Humble	3	1	2	2
4	(Republic of Ireland) Ireland	Rebecca O'Callaghan (née Best), Brona Ringland (née Conway), Jill McCaughey, Yvonne Jackson	3	0	3	0

=== Pool B ===
Date	Team One	Team Two	Score
Oct 13	Australia	Netherlands	3-0
Oct 13	New Zealand	Finland	3-0
Oct 14	Australia	Finland	3-0
Oct 14	New Zealand	Netherlands	3-0
Oct 15	Finland	Netherlands	0-3
Oct 15	Australia	New Zealand	2-1

Pos	Nation	Team	P	W	L	Pts
1	Australia	Robyn Lambourne, Liz Irving, Michelle Martin, Sarah Fitzgerald	3	3	0	6
2	New Zealand	Susan Devoy, Donna Newton, Marie Pearson, Philippa Beams	3	2	1	4
3	Netherlands	Vanessa Atkinson, Hugoline van Hoorn, Marjolein Houtsma, Denise Sommers	3	1	2	2
4	Finland	Tuula Myllyniemi, Nina Taimiaho, Mia Markkanen	3	0	0	3

=== Pool C ===
Date	Team One	Team Two	Score
Oct 12	France	Brazil	3-0
Oct 12	Sweden	France	2-1
Oct 12	South Africa	Singapore	3-0
Oct 12	South Africa	Brazil	3-0
Oct 13	Singapore	Brazil	2-1
Oct 13	South Africa	Sweden	3-0
Oct 14	South Africa	France	3-0
Oct 14	Singapore	Sweden	3-0
Oct 15	France	Singapore	2-1
Oct 15	Sweden	Brazil	3-0

Pos	Nation	Team	P	W	L	Pts
1	South Africa	Claire Nitch, Angelique Clifton-Parks, Chantel Clifton-Parks	4	4	0	8
2	France	Catherine Lebossé, Corinne Castets, Corinne Vezin, Nathalie Cornet	4	2	2	4
3	Singapore	Mah Li Lian, Della Lee, Josephine Choo, Jane Ong	4	2	2	4
4	Sweden	Eva Svenby, Lotta Olsson, Tinna Backlund, Christina Waker	4	2	2	4
5	Brazil	Karen Redfern, Maria Caltabiano, Marina Redfern	4	0	4	0

=== Pool D ===
Date	Team One	Team Two	Score
Oct 12	Japan	Cayman Islands	2-1
Oct 12	Scotland	Japan	3-0
Oct 12	United States	Cayman Islands	3-0
Oct 12	United States	Malaysia	3-0
Oct 13	Malaysia	Japan	2-1
Oct 13	Scotland	Cayman Islands	3-0
Oct 14	Scotland	Malaysia	3-0
Oct 14	United States	Japan	3-0
Oct 15	Malaysia	Cayman Islands	3-0
Oct 15	Scotland	United States	2-1

Pos	Nation	Team	P	W	L	Pts
1	Scotland	Shirley Brown, Alison Bowie, Emma Donaldson, Wendy Maitland	4	4	0	8
2	United States	Demer Holleran, Shabana Khan, Karen Kelso, Ellie Pierce	4	3	1	6
3	Malaysia	Sandra Wu, Kong Yuen Yuen, Koh Yoke Keet	4	2	2	4
4	Japan	Yuriko Sakai, Machiko Miyagishima, Yuko Kimura	4	1	3	2
5	Cayman Islands	G Lawrence, F Evans, Janet Sairsingh	4	0	4	0

== Quarter finals ==
Team One	Team Two	Score
Australia	South Africa	3-0
England	Scotland	3-0
Netherlands	Germany	2-1
Canada	New Zealand	0-3

== Semi finals ==
Team One	Team Two	Score
Australia	Netherlands	3-0
England	New Zealand	1-2

== Third Place Play Off ==
Team One	Team Two	Score
England	Netherlands	3-0

== Final ==
Australia
2
FINAL
Vancouver, British Columbia, Canada
17 October 1992

New Zealand
1

			1	2	3	4	5
1	(Australia) (New Zealand)	Robyn Lambourne; Donna Newton	2; 9	9; 2	9; 6	9; 1
2	(Australia) (New Zealand)	Liz Irving; Philippa Beams	9; 1	9; 5	9; 1
3	(Australia) (New Zealand)	Michelle Martin; Susan Devoy	5; 9	1; 9	0; 9

Preceded by Australia; 1990	Squash World Team; Canada; 1992	Succeeded by Guernsey; 1994

== See also ==
- World Team Squash Championships
- World Squash Federation
- World Open (squash)
