= British National Squash Championships =

British national squash competition

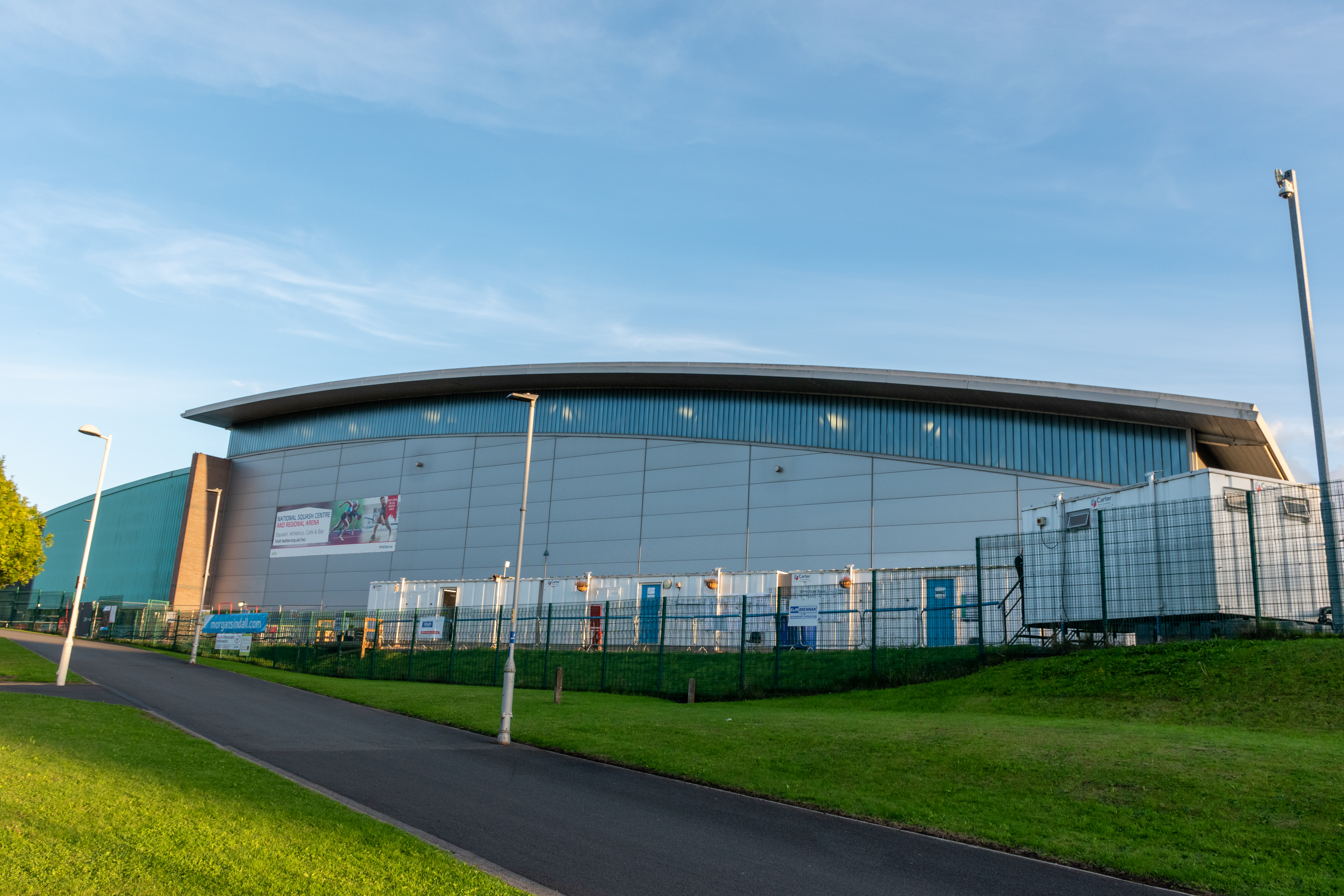
- National Squash Centre in Manchester has hosted the event 17 times

Tournament information
- Sport: Squash
- Location: Various
- Established: 1974
- Administrator: England Squash
- Website: England Squash

The British National Squash Championships are the national squash championships for players from the United Kingdom and Ireland. It was also referred to as the National championships (closed), meaning being closed to overseas players. They are held on an annual basis, with the venue changing for each year. The championships also involve masters events for British male and female squash players in different age groups ranging from over-35 up to over-75.

The Championships were inaugurated in 1974 and are not to be confused with the much older British Open Squash Championships and the defunct British Amateur Squash Championships. Both events allowed any player from any nation to compete.

== History ==
The first championships were held for men in 1974, with the women's tournament added the following year. Initially held in December of each year, the championships were moved to January/February in 1991.

Many leading male players boycotted the 1993 tournament in protest over a range of issues, including the amount of prize money on offer and the Squash Rackets Association's selection criteria for the England team.

In 2004, Cassie Campion (during her final competitive year) surpassed Sue Cogswell's record by winning her sixth title. This remains as the women's record today. The men's Over 70 event was added in 2005 and the men's Over 75 event was added in 2011.

The 2012 men's final was contested between the reigning World Champion and World No.1, Nick Matthew, and the reigning World No.2, James Willstrop. Matthew won 3–1 to claim his fourth British National title and equal the record set by Phil Kenyon. During the year that Matthew retired (2018) he extended the record to ten titles.

=== Venues ===
The championships were held at the National Squash Centre at Sportscity in Manchester from 2003 to 2018.

The women's tournament began in 1975 and was initially hosted at Edgbaston Priory Club in Birmingham, before moving on to Dallington, Northamptonshire (1976–77), Carriages in Hellingly, East Sussex (1978), Chichester, West Sussex (1979) and Wembley Squash Centre (1980–82). From 1983 the women's and men's championships were held in the same location.

Year	Venue	Location
1974-75	Wembley Squash Centre	London
1976	Wimbledon Stadium	London
1977-84	Abbeydale Park	Dore, South Yorkshire
1985-88	Brunel Old Station	Bristol
1989-91	Eldon Square	Newcastle upon Tyne
1992	Armitage Centre, University of Manchester	Manchester
1993	Village Hotel	Cheadle, Greater Manchester
1994	Herts Country Club	Welwyn Garden City
1995	Abbeydale Park	Dore, South Yorkshire
1996	Edgbaston Priory Club	Birmingham
1997	Northern Lawn Tennis Club	Manchester
1998	G-Mex	Manchester
1999-2002	Manchester Velodrome	Manchester
2003–2018	National Squash Centre	Manchester
2019–2020	David Ross Sports Village and Nottingham SRC	Nottingham
2021	National Squash Centre	Manchester
2022	David Ross Sports Village and Nottingham SRC	Nottingham
2023–2025	St George's Hill Lawn Tennis Club	Weybridge

== Past results ==
=== Men's finals ===
Year	Champion	Runner-up	Score in final	ref
1974	Jonathan Leslie	Stuart Courtney	6–9, 8–10, 9–3, 9–3, 9-2	
1975	Phil Ayton	Stuart Courtney	7–9, 9–7, 9–10, 9–7, 9-1	
1976	Jonathan Leslie	John Richardson	2–9, 9–4, 5–9, 9–6, 9-5	
1977	Phil Kenyon	Jonathan Leslie	2–9, 9–5, 9–3, 9-6	
1978	Peter Verow	Phil Kenyon	7–9, 9–6, 9–10, 9–4, 9-0	
1979	Gawain Briars	Ian Robinson	9–5, 9–5, 9-0	
1980	Jonah Barrington	Gawain Briars	4–9, 9–3, 9–0, 9-2	
1981	Phil Kenyon	Gawain Briars	9–5, 9–4, 9-6	
1982	Gawain Briars	Phil Kenyon	9–7, 9–0, 9-2	
1983	Phil Kenyon	Gawain Briars	5–9, 9–4, 1–9, 10–8, 9-1	
1984	Geoff Williams	Bryan Beeson	9–3, 9–1, 9-1	
1985	Phil Kenyon	Gawain Briars	2–9, 9–4, 6–9, 9-3	
1986	Bryan Beeson	Mark Maclean	9–2, 9–4, 6–9, 9-3	
1987	Del Harris	Ashley Naylor	3–9, 9–1, 9–6, 9-4	
1988	Paul Carter	Neil Harvey	2–9, 9–4, 3–9, 9–6, 9-2	
1989	Del Harris	Bryan Beeson	1–9, 6–9, 9–4, 9–2, 9-3	
1990	not held			
1991	Paul Gregory	Simon Parke	9–4, 7–9, 9–2, 9-0	
1992	Peter Marshall	Bryan Beeson	7–9, 9–4, 9–0, 9-0	
1993	Phil Whitlock	Mark Allen	9–1, 9–7, 9-1	
1994	Peter Marshall	Peter Nicol	9–6, 9–7, 9-4	
1995	Stephen Meads	Nick Taylor	9–2, 9–0, 9-1	
1996	Peter Nicol	Mark Chaloner	9–6, 9–7, 9-1	
1997	Mark Cairns	Alex Gough	9–5, 9–7, 9-4	
1998	Simon Parke	Mark Cairns	15–11, 15–11, 15-13	
1999	Paul Johnson	Simon Parke	10–15, 15–5, 15–8, 1–15, 15–7	
2000	Peter Marshall	David Evans	15–9, 15–6, 15–11	
2001	Lee Beachill	Nick Taylor	15–13, 15–5, 15–8	
2002	Lee Beachill	Peter Nicol	15–8, 13–15, 15–5, 15–10	
2003	Peter Nicol	Lee Beachill	7–15, 15–11, 15–9, 12–15, 15–8	
2004	John White	Lee Beachill	17–16, 17–14, 14–15, 15–8	
2005	Lee Beachill	James Willstrop	11–3, 11–6, 11–3	
2006	Nick Matthew	Lee Beachill	11–9, 6–11, 11–9, 10–12, 12–10	
2007	James Willstrop	John White	12–10, 11–7, 11–5	
2008	James Willstrop	Lee Beachill	11–9, 11–8, 11–4	
2009	Nick Matthew	Adrian Grant	11–4, 11–3, 11–9	
2010	Nick Matthew	James Willstrop	11–5, 11–6, 11–6 (49m)	
2011	Daryl Selby	Nick Matthew	9–11, 11–9, 6–11, 11–9, 11–7 (84m)	
2012	Nick Matthew	James Willstrop	11–8, 11–3, 8–11, 14–12 (81m)	
2013	Nick Matthew	James Willstrop	11–9, 11–3, 11–3 (49m)	
2014	Nick Matthew	James Willstrop	5–11, 12–10, 11–4, 11–8 (78m)	
2015	Nick Matthew	Daryl Selby	11–5, 11–3, 11–2 (45m)	
2016	Nick Matthew	James Willstrop	11–2, 6–11, 11–3, 11–3 (50m)	
2017	Nick Matthew	Joe Lee	11–6, 11–4, 11–8 (40m)	
2018	Nick Matthew	James Willstrop	11–7, 12–10, 8–7, 11–6 (69m)	
2019	James Willstrop	Daryl Selby	11–5, 7–11, 11–5, 11-7 (60m)	
2020	James Willstrop	Joel Makin	12–10, 0–11, 12–10, 14-12	
2021	Joel Makin	Adrian Waller	11–7, 11–2, 11-1	
2022	Mohamed El Shorbagy	Joel Makin	12–10, 12–10, 12-10	
2023	Mohamed El Shorbagy	Joel Makin	11–7, 12–10, 11-5	
2024	Joel Makin	Mohamed El Shorbagy	8–11, 15–13, 11–3, 8–11, 11-2	
2025	Joel Makin	Nick Wall	11–4, 12–10, 11–3	

=== Women's finals ===
Year	Champion	Runner-up	Score in final	ref
1975	Sue Cogswell	Teresa Lawes	9–4, 9–7, 9-1	
1976	Angela Smith	Sue Cogswell	9–3, 9–5, 9-7	
1977	Sue Cogswell	Teresa Lawes	9–2, 9–0, 9-1	
1978	Sue Cogswell	Angela Smith	10–8, 9–1, 9-4	
1979	Sue Cogswell	Angela Smith	5–9, 10–9, 10–8, 9-4	
1980	Sue Cogswell	Martine Le Moignan	9–7, 9–4, 9-1	
1981	Lisa Opie	Angela Smith	10–8, 9–4, 9-7	
1982	Alison Cumings	Martine Le Moignan	7–9, 9–4, 7–9, 9–2, 9-4	
1983	Lisa Opie	Martine Le Moignan	10–9, 9–1, 9-4	
1984	Martine Le Moignan	Alison Cumings	9–1, 9–2, 9-0	
1985	Lucy Soutter	Heather Wallace	9–7, 9–5, 9-0	
1986	Lisa Opie	Martine Le Moignan	9–7, 9–1, 9-0	
1987	Lisa Opie	Lucy Soutter	6–9, 5–9, 9–2, 9–0, 9-4	
1988	Martine Le Moignan	Alison Cumings	9–3, 6–9, 4–9, 9–4, 9-0	
1989	Lucy Soutter	Suzanne Horner	9–3, 9–5, 9-3	
1990	not held			
1991	Martine Le Moignan	Suzanne Horner	9–7, 9–1, 10-8	
1992	Sue Wright	Suzanne Horner	9–2, 9–6, 5–9, 9-5	
1993	Cassie Campion	Fiona Geaves	9–3, 9–3, 9-4	
1994	Suzanne Horner	Sue Wright	9–4, 9–1, 9-1	
1995	Fiona Geaves	Linda Elriani	9–6, 9–10, 9–6, 9-6	
1996	Suzanne Horner	Linda Elriani	9–4, 7–9, 9–4, 9-1	
1997	Sue Wright	Cassie Campion	9–4, 9–10, 9–6, 9-6	
1998	Sue Wright	Cassie Campion	3–9, 9–3, 9–1, 9-2	
1999	Cassie Campion	Sue Wright	9–5, 3–9, 6–9, 9–0, 9–6	
2000	Cassie Campion	Sue Wright	9–1, 2–9, 9–2, 2–9, 9–3	
2001	Sue Wright	Fiona Geaves	10–9, 9–2, 3–9, 10–8	
2002	Cassie Campion	Linda Charman	9–5, 9–6, 9–2	
2003	Cassie Campion	Rebecca Macree	9–6, 4–9, 9–4, 9–3	
2004	Cassie Campion	Linda Charman	9–3, 9–1, 9–5	
2005	Linda Charman	Alison Waters	9–2, 9–4, 9–3	
2006	Tania Bailey	Linda Charman	9–7, 6–9, 9–6, 9–3	
2007	Jenny Duncalf	Alison Waters	5–9, 6–9, 9–3, 9–0, 9–3	
2008	Alison Waters	Laura Lengthorn-Massaro	6–11, 11–7, 11–8, 11–9	
2009	Jenny Duncalf	Alison Waters	11–13, 11–8, 11–6, 11–6	
2010	Alison Waters	Jenny Duncalf	10–12, 11–7, 4–11, 11–7, 12–10 (65m)	
2011	Laura Massaro	Jenny Duncalf	7–11, 11–9, 7–11, 11–7, 11–2 (62m)	
2012	Laura Massaro	Alison Waters	11–2, 11–9, 8–11, 11–4 (53m)	
2013	Alison Waters	Laura Massaro	11–7, 7–11, 12–10, 6–11, 13–11 (78m)	
2014	Alison Waters	Madeline Perry	11–3, 11–6, 11–6 (32m)	
2015	Sarah-Jane Perry	Laura Massaro	12–10, 11–9, 7–11, 10–12, 11–7 (80m)	
2016	Laura Massaro	Alison Waters	11–2, 11–5, 11–4 (24m)	
2017	Laura Massaro	Sarah-Jane Perry	11–5, 12–10, 11-9 (42m)	
2018	Tesni Evans	Alison Waters	11–5, 11–9, 11-7 (43m)	
2019	Tesni Evans	Emily Whitlock	11-3 11-6 11-5 (31m)	
2020	Sarah-Jane Perry	Jasmine Hutton	11–9, 11–9, 11-9	
2021	Sarah-Jane Perry	Georgina Kennedy	9–11, 11–4, 11–8, 11-6	
2022	Jasmine Hutton	Lucy Beecroft	11–3, 11–9, 11-8	
2023	Jasmine Hutton	Tesni Evans	13–11, 11–8, 8–11, 7–11, 5–3 ret	
2024	Georgina Kennedy	Sarah-Jane Perry	11–9, 11–8, 9–11, 11–9	
2025	Tesni Murphy	Torrie Malik	11–9, 11–5, 7–11, 11–9	
