= 1990 Women's World Team Squash Championships =

Women's World Team 1990
- 7th World Women's Team Championship
- Location: Sydney, Australia
- Date: October 15–21, 1990

Results
- Champions: England
- Runners-up: Australia
- Third place: New Zealand

The 1990 Women's Mazda World Team Squash Championships were held in Sydney, Australia from 15 until 21 October 1990.

== First round ==
=== Pool A ===
Date	Team One	Team Two	Score
Oct 15	England	Finland	3-0
Oct 15	(Republic of Ireland) Ireland	Germany	1-2
Oct 16	England	(Republic of Ireland) Ireland	2-1
Oct 16	Germany	Finland	2-1
Oct 17	England	Germany	3-0
Oct 17	(Republic of Ireland) Ireland	Finland	2-1

Pos	Nation	Team	P	W	L	Pts
1	England	Martine Le Moignan, Lisa Opie, Suzanne Horner, Lucy Soutter	3	3	0	6
2	Germany	Beate Müller, Andrea Holbe, Sabine Schöne, Daniela Grzenia	3	2	1	4
3	(Republic of Ireland) Ireland	Rebecca Best, Marjorie Croke (née Burke), Brona Conway	3	1	2	2
4	Finland	Tuula Myllyniemi, Nina Taimiaho, Minna Sinervo	3	0	3	0

=== Pool B ===
Date	Team One	Team Two	Score
Oct 15	Australia	Netherlands	3-0
Oct 15	New Zealand	Scotland	3-0
Oct 16	Australia	Scotland	3-0
Oct 16	New Zealand	Netherlands	3-0
Oct 17	Scotland	Netherlands	0-3
Oct 17	Australia	New Zealand	2-1

Pos	Nation	Team	P	W	L	Pts
1	Australia	Danielle Drady, Robyn Lambourne, Liz Irving, Michelle Martin	3	3	0	6
2	New Zealand	Susan Devoy, Donna Newton, Joanne Williams, Marie Pearson	3	2	1	4
3	Netherlands	Hugoline van Hoorn, Marjolein Houtsma, Nicole Beumer	3	1	2	2
4	Scotland	Shirley Brown, Joan Sutherland, Alison Bowie, Julie Nichol	3	0	0	3

== Semi finals ==
Team One	Team Two	Score
Australia	Germany	3-0
England	New Zealand	3-0

== Third Place Play Off ==
Team One	Team Two	Score
New Zealand	Germany	3-0

== Final ==
England
2
FINAL
Sydney, Australia
21 October 1990

Australia
1

			1	2	3	4	5
1	(England) (Australia)	Suzanne Horner; Michelle Martin	1; 9	9; 6	10; 8	5; 9	2; 9
2	(England) (Australia)	Lisa Opie; Danielle Drady	9; 4	6; 9	9; 6	9; 5
3	(England) (Australia)	Martine Le Moignan; Liz Irving	2; 9	9; 7	7; 9	9; 3	9; 3

== See also ==
- World Team Squash Championships
- World Squash Federation
- World Open (squash)

Preceded by Netherlands; 1989	Squash World Team; Sydney; 1990	Succeeded by Canada; 1992
