= 1987 Women's World Team Squash Championships =

Women's World Team 1987
- 5th World Women's Team Championship
- Location: Auckland, New Zealand
- Date: October 07 - October 14, 1987

Results
- Champions: England
- Runners-up: Australia
- Third place: New Zealand

The 1987 Women's Honda World Team Squash Championships were held in Auckland, New Zealand from October 7 to October 14, 1987. The England team, who were the defending champions, defeated Australia 2-1 in the final.

== Seeds ==
1. England
2. New Zealand
3. Australia
4. (Republic of Ireland) Ireland
5. Canada
6. Scotland
7. United States
8. Netherlands
9. Wales
10. Sweden
11. West Germany
12. Norway
13. France
14. Japan

== First round ==
=== Pool A ===
Date	Team One	Team Two	Score
Oct 7	England	Canada	3-0
Oct 7	(Republic of Ireland) Ireland	Netherlands	3-0
Oct 7	France	Norway	3-0
Oct 8	England	Wales	3-0
Oct 8	(Republic of Ireland) Ireland	Norway	3-0
Oct 8	France	Canada	0-3
Oct 8	England	Netherlands	3-0
Oct 8	(Republic of Ireland) Ireland	Wales	3-0
Oct 8	Canada	Norway	3-0
Oct 9	England	France	3-0
Oct 9	(Republic of Ireland) Ireland	Canada	3-0
Oct 9	Netherlands	Wales	2-1
Oct 10	England	(Republic of Ireland) Ireland	3-0
Oct 10	Norway	Netherlands	0-3
Oct 10	France	Wales	2-1
Oct 11	Netherlands	Canada	1-2
Oct 11	(Republic of Ireland) Ireland	France	3-0
Oct 11	Wales	Norway	3-0
Oct 12	England	Norway	3-0
Oct 12	Canada	Wales	3-0
Oct 12	France	Netherlands	0-3

Pos	Nation	Team	P	W	L	Pts
1	England	Martine Le Moignan, Lisa Opie, Alison Cumings, Lucy Soutter	6	6	0	12
2	(Republic of Ireland) Ireland	Mary Byrne, Rebecca Best, Marjorie Burke	6	5	1	10
3	Canada	Joyce Maycock, Nancy Cranbury, Gail Pimm	6	4	2	8
4	Netherlands	Babette Hoogendoorn, Mariëtte Remijnse, Hugoline van Hoorn, Marjolein Houtsma	6	3	3	6
5	France	Catherine Lebossé, Corinne Castets, Sabine Vinci, Nathalie Cornet	6	2	4	4
6	Wales	Tracey Thomas, Sarah Fury, Sian Johnson, Sharon Stevenson	6	1	5	2
7	Norway	Astrid Åbyholm, Guri Lenth, Cecilie Schjander	6	0	6	0

=== Pool B ===
Date	Team One	Team Two	Score
Oct 7	New Zealand	West Germany	3-0
Oct 7	Australia	United States	3-0
Oct 7	Scotland	Sweden	3-0
Oct 8	New Zealand	Sweden	3-0
Oct 8	Australia	West Germany	3-0
Oct 8	Scotland	Japan	3-0
Oct 8	New Zealand	Scotland	3-0
Oct 8	Australia	Sweden	3-0
Oct 8	United States	Japan	3-0
Oct 9	Sweden	West Germany	2-1
Oct 9	Australia	Japan	3-0
Oct 9	Scotland	United States	2-1
Oct 10	New Zealand	United States	3-0
Oct 10	Australia	Scotland	3-0
Oct 10	West Germany	Japan	3-0
Oct 11	New Zealand	Australia	0-3
Oct 11	West Germany	United States	2-1
Oct 11	Japan	Sweden	1-2
Oct 12	New Zealand	Japan	3-0
Oct 12	Sweden	United States	2-1
Oct 12	Scotland	West Germany	2-1

Pos	Nation	Team	P	W	L	Pts
1	Australia	Vicki Cardwell, Sarah Fitzgerald, Robyn Friday, Michelle Martin	6	6	0	12
2	New Zealand	Susan Devoy, Cheryl Te Kani, Donna Gurran, Joanne Williams	6	5	1	10
3	Scotland	Alison Cruickshank, Shirley Brown, Joan Sutherland	6	4	2	8
4	West Germany	Beate Müller, Eva Körschgen, Andrea Holbe	6	3	3	6
5	United States	Alicia McConnell, Karen Kelso, Nancy Gengler, Diana Staley	6	2	4	4
6	Sweden	Lena Fridén, Eva Svenby, Susanne Nyberg, Tinna Backlund	6	1	5	2
7	Japan	Miyuki Fukutomi, Sachi Akiyama, Machiko Miyagishima	6	0	6	0

== Semi finals ==
Team One	Team Two	Score
Australia	(Republic of Ireland) Ireland	3-0
England	New Zealand	3-0

== Third Place Play Off ==
Team One	Team Two	Score
New Zealand	(Republic of Ireland) Ireland	2-1

== Final ==
England
2
FINAL
YMCA Stadium, Auckland, New Zealand
14 October 1987

Australia
1

			1	2	3	4	5
1	(England) (Australia)	Lisa Opie; Vicki Cardwell	9; 3	9; 3	6; 9	9; 5
2	(England) (Australia)	Martine Le Moignan; Robyn Friday	5; 9	9; 5	0; 9	9; 6	5; 9
3	(England) (Australia)	Lucy Soutter; Sarah Fitzgerald	9; 6	9; 3	9; 4

Preceded by Ireland; 1985	Squash World Team; New Zealand; 1987	Succeeded by Netherlands; 1989

== See also ==
- World Team Squash Championships
- World Squash Federation
- World Open (squash)
