= 1989 Women's World Team Squash Championships =

Women's World Team 1989
- 6th World Women's Team Championship
- Location: Warmond, Netherlands
- Date: March 14–19, 1989

Results
- Champions: England
- Runners-up: Australia
- Third place: New Zealand

The 1989 Women's NCM World Team Squash Championships were held in Warmond, in the Netherlands from March 14 until March 19, 1989. The England team became champions for the third consecutive time, defeating the previous edition's runners-up Australia 3-0 in the final.

== First round ==
=== Pool A ===
Date	Team One	Team Two	Score
Mar 14	England	Canada	3-0
Mar 14	(Republic of Ireland) Ireland	Netherlands	2-1
Mar 15	England	Netherlands	3-0
Mar 15	(Republic of Ireland) Ireland	Canada	3-0
Mar 16	England	(Republic of Ireland) Ireland	3-0
Mar 16	Netherlands	Canada	3-0

Pos	Nation	Team	P	W	L	Pts
1	England	Martine Le Moignan, Lisa Opie, Alison Cumings, Suzanne Horner	3	3	0	6
2	(Republic of Ireland) Ireland	Rebecca Best, Marjorie Croke (née Burke), Caroline Collins, Brona Conway	3	2	1	4
3	Netherlands	Babette Hoogendoorn, Hugoline van Hoorn, Marjolein Houtsma, Nicole Beumer	3	1	2	2
4	Canada	Gail Pimm, Lori Coleman, Shelley Harvey, Amanda Paton	3	0	3	0

=== Pool B ===
Date	Team One	Team Two	Score
Mar 14	Australia	Scotland	3-0
Mar 14	New Zealand	West Germany	3-0
Mar 15	Australia	West Germany	3-0
Mar 15	New Zealand	Scotland	3-0
Mar 16	Australia	New Zealand	3-0
Mar 16	Scotland	West Germany	2-1

Pos	Nation	Team	P	W	L	Pts
1	Australia	Vicki Cardwell, Danielle Drady, Robyn Lambourne, Liz Irving	3	3	0	6
2	New Zealand	Susan Devoy, Donna Newton, Joanne Williams, Fleur Townsend	3	2	1	4
3	Scotland	Alison Cruickshank, Shirley Brown, Joan Sutherland, Julie Nicol	3	1	2	2
4	West Germany	Beate Müller, Andrea Holbe, Sabine Schöne, Daniela Grzenia	3	0	0	3

== Quarter finals ==
Team One	Team Two	Score
Australia	Netherlands	3-0
England	Scotland	3-0
West Germany	(Republic of Ireland) Ireland	2-1
New Zealand	Canada	3-0

== Semi finals ==
Team One	Team Two	Score
Australia	West Germany	2-1
England	New Zealand	2-1

== Third Place Play Off ==
Team One	Team Two	Score
New Zealand	West Germany	3-0

== Final ==
England
3
FINAL
Warmond, the Netherlands
19 March 1989

Australia
0

			1	2	3	4	5
1	(England) (Australia)	Martine Le Moignan; Liz Irving	9; 3	9; 2	8; 10	9; 4
2	(England) (Australia)	Suzanne Horner; Danielle Drady	9; 5	4; 9	9; 6	5; 9	9; 5
3	(England) (Australia)	Lisa Opie; Vicki Cardwell *

Cardwell conceded the third rubber*

Preceded by New Zealand; 1987	Squash World Team; The Netherlands; 1989	Succeeded by Australia; 1990

== See also ==
- World Team Squash Championships
- World Squash Federation
- World Open (squash)
