= 1998 Women's World Team Squash Championships =

Women's World Team 1998
- 11th World Women's Team Championship
- Location: Stuttgart, Germany
- Date: November 09 - November 15, 1998

Results
- Champions: Australia
- Runners-up: England
- Third place: New Zealand

The 1998 Women's World Team Squash Championships were held in Stuttgart, Germany and took place from November 9 until November 15, 1998.

== Seeds ==
1. Australia
2. England
3. South Africa
4. New Zealand
5. Germany
6. Netherlands
7. Canada
8. Egypt
9. Spain
10. United States
11. Belgium
12. France
13. Sweden
14. Hong Kong

== First round ==
=== Pool A ===
Date	Team One	Team Two	Score
Nov 09	Australia	Germany	3-0
Nov 09	New Zealand	United States	3-0
Nov 10	Australia	New Zealand	3-0
Nov 10	Germany	United States	3-0
Nov 11	Australia	United States	3-0
Nov 11	New Zealand	Germany	2-1

Pos	Nation	Team	P	W	L	Pts
1	Australia	Michelle Martin, Sarah Fitzgerald, Carol Owens, Liz Irving	3	3	0	6
2	New Zealand	Philippa Beams, Sarah Cook, Leilani Joyce, Shelley Kitchen	3	2	1	4
3	Germany	Sabine Schöne, Sandy Suck, Sabine Baum, Karin Beriere	3	1	2	2
4	United States	Louisa Hall, Demer Holleran, Ellie Pierce, Ivy Pochoda	3	0	3	0

=== Pool B ===
Date	Team One	Team Two	Score
Nov 09	England	Spain	3-0
Nov 09	South Africa	Netherlands	3-0
Nov 10	England	Netherlands	3-0
Nov 10	South Africa	Spain	3-0
Nov 11	England	South Africa	2-1
Nov 11	Netherlands	Spain	2-1

Pos	Nation	Team	P	W	L	Pts
1	England	Sue Wright, Suzanne Horner, Linda Charman, Jane Martin	3	3	0	6
2	South Africa	Claire Nitch, Natalie Grainger, Angelique Clifton-Parks, Annelize Naudé	3	2	1	4
3	Netherlands	Vanessa Atkinson, Nicole Beumer, Daphne Jelgersma, Marjolein Houtsma	3	1	2	2
4	Spain	Laia Sans, Natalia Meneu, Elisabet Sadò	3	0	0	3

=== Pool C ===
Date	Team One	Team Two	Score
Nov 09	France	Austria	3-0
Nov 09	Canada	Sweden	3-0
Nov 10	France	Canada	2-1
Nov 10	Sweden	Austria	3-0
Nov 11	Canada	Austria	3-0
Nov 11	France	Sweden	3-0

Pos	Nation	Team	P	W	L	Pts
1	France	Isabelle Stoehr, Corinne Castets, Astrid Gamory, Laurence Bruniera	3	3	0	6
2	Canada	Heather Wallace, Melanie Jans, Marnie Baizley, Lauren Wagner	3	2	1	4
3	Sweden	Maria Lundmark, Johanna Wahlberg, Jenny Akervall, Eva Svenby	3	1	2	2
4	Austria	Sissi Coli, Pamela Pancis, Ines Gradnitzer	3	0	0	3

=== Pool D ===
Date	Team One	Team Two	Score
Nov 09	Egypt	(Republic of Ireland) Ireland	2-1
Nov 09	Belgium	Hong Kong	2-1
Nov 10	Belgium	(Republic of Ireland) Ireland	3-0
Nov 10	Egypt	Hong Kong	3-0
Nov 11	Belgium	Egypt	0-3
Nov 11	Hong Kong	(Republic of Ireland) Ireland	1-2

Pos	Nation	Team	P	W	L	Pts
1	Egypt	Salma Shabana, Maha Zein, Omneya Abdel Kawy, Engy Kheirallah	3	3	0	6
2	Belgium	Annabel Romadenne, Kim Hannes, Katline Cauwels	3	2	1	4
3	(Republic of Ireland) Ireland	Laura Mylotte, Olivia French, Eleanor Lapthorne, Jenny Dillon	3	1	2	2
4	Hong Kong	Rebecca Chiu, Elsie Ng, Christina Mak, Iris Chung	3	0	0	3

== Quarter finals ==
Date	Team One	Team Two	Score
Nov 13	Australia	Egypt	3-0
Nov 13	New Zealand	Netherlands	3-0
Nov 13	South Africa	(Netherlands) Germany	3-0
Nov 13	England	France	3-0

== Semi finals ==
Date	Team One	Team Two	Score
Nov 14	Australia	South Africa	3-0
Nov 14	England	New Zealand	2-1

== Third Place Play Off ==
Date	Team One	Team Two	Score
Nov 15	New Zealand	South Africa	2-1

== Final ==
Australia
3
FINAL
Stuttgart, Germany
15 November 1998

England
0

			1	2	3	4	5
1	(Australia) (England)	Michelle Martin; Sue Wright	3; 9	9; 3	9; 10	9; 2	9; 5
2	(Australia) (England)	Carl Owens; Jane Martin	9; 4	9; 7	9; 1
3	(Australia) (England)	Sarah Fitzgerald; Suzanne Horner	9; 6	9; 4

Preceded by Malaysia; 1996	Squash World Team; Germany; 1998	Succeeded by England; 2000

== See also ==
- World Team Squash Championships
- World Squash Federation
- World Open (squash)
