= 1997 European Squash Team Championships =

Squash tournament

- 26th
- Location: (Denmark) Odense
- Venue: Congress Centre
- Date: 23 – 26 April 1997
- Website europeansquash.com

Results
- Champions: Men England; Women England

The 1997 European Squash Team Championships, sponsored by Dunlop, was the 26th edition of European Squash Team Championships for squash players. The event was held at the Congress Centre in Odense, Denmark, from 23 to 26 April 1997. The tournament was organised by the European Squash Rackets Federation (ESRF).

The England men's team won their 22nd title and the England women's team won their 20th title.

== Men's tournament ==
=== Group stage ===
Pool A

Pos	Team	P	W	L	Pts
1	England	3	3	0	6
2	Wales	3	2	1	4
3	Sweden	3	1	2	2
4	Germany	3	0	3	0

Pool B

Pos	Team	P	W	L	Pts
1	France	3	3	0	6
2	Finland	3	2	1	4
3	Scotland	3	1	2	2
4	Spain	3	0	3	0

=== Semi finals ===
England
4
Semi-final 1

Finland
0

			1	2	3	4	5
1	(England) (Finland)	Nick Taylor; Mika Monto	9; 5	9; 2	9; 4
2	(England) (Finland)	Stephen Meads; Janne Kyttänen	9; 7	9; 1	9; 5
3	(England) (Finland)	Mark Cairns; Ville Sistonen	9; 3	9; 3	9; 0
4	(England) (Finland)	Danny Meddings; Timo Tuominen	9; 2	9; 3	9; 6

Wales
3
Semi-final 2

France
1

			1	2	3	4	5
1	(Wales) (France)	Alex Gough; Christophe Montagnier	9; 3	9; 4	9; 4
2	(Wales) (France)	David Evans; Thierry Lincou	9; 4	9; 10	9; 2	10; 9
3	(Wales) (France)	Gareth Davies; Stephane Galifi	9; 2	9; 7	9; 7
4	(Wales) (France)	Matthew Benjamin; Jean-Michel Arrucci	9; 3	3; 9	4; 9	9; 4	2; 9

=== Third place ===
Finland
3
Third place

France
1

			1	2	3	4	5
1	(Finland) (France)	Juha Raumolin; Christophe Montagnier	9; 6	10; 8	9; 1
2	(Finland) (France)	Timo Tuominen; Jean-Michel Arrucci	9; 6	7; 9	9; 5	9; 8
3	(Finland) (France)	Janne Kyttänen; Renan Lavigne	3; 9	10; 8	9; 4	9; 0
4	(Finland) (France)	Ville Sistonen; Thierry Lincou	8; 10	0; 9	9; 9	1; 9

=== Final ===
England
4
Final

Wales
0

			1	2	3	4	5
1	(England) (Wales)	Nick Taylor; Matthew Benjamin	9; 1	9; 1	9; 0
2	(England) (Wales)	Stephen Meads; Gareth Davies	10; 9	9; 4	9; 7
3	(England) (Wales)	Mark Cairns; Alex Gough	9; 3	8; 10	3; 9	9; 4	9; 6
4	(England) (Wales)	Paul Johnson; David Evans	9; 5	9; 5	9; 5

== Women's tournament ==
=== Group stage ===
Pool A

Pos	Team	P	W	L	Pts
1	England	3	3	0	6
2	Scotland	3	2	1	4
3	France	3	1	2	2
4	Denmark	3	0	3	0

Pool B

Pos	Team	P	W	L	Pts
1	Germany	3	3	0	6
2	Netherlands	3	2	1	4
3	Finland	3	1	2	2
4	Switzerland	3	0	3	0

=== Semi-finals ===
England
3
Semi-final 1

Netherlands
0

			1	2	3	4	5
1	(England) (Netherlands)	Sue Wright; Hugoline Van Hoorn	9; 5	9; 2	9; 4
2	(England) (Netherlands)	Linda Charman; Nicole Beumer	9; 4	9; 10	9; 2	9; 2
3	(England) (Netherlands)	Jane Martin; Daphne Jelgersma	9; 0	9; 1	9; 6

Germany
2
Semi-final 2

Scotland
1

			1	2	3	4	5
1	(Germany) (Scotland)	Sabine Schöne; Claire Waddell	9; 3	9; 3	7; 9	9; 2
2	(Germany) (Scotland)	Sabine Baum; Senga Macfie	7; 9	2; 9	0; 9
3	(Germany) (Scotland)	Karin Berière; Pamela Nimmo	10; 8	10; 8	7; 9	2; 9	9; 3

=== Third place ===
Netherlands
?
Third place

Scotland
?

		1	2	3	4	5
1	(Netherlands) (Scotland)
2	(Netherlands) (Scotland)
3	(Netherlands) (Scotland)

=== Final ===
England
3
Final

Germany
0

			1	2	3	4	5
1	(England) (Germany)	Sue Wright; Sabine Schöne	9; 6	9; 6	9; 5
2	(England) (Germany)	Linda Charman; Sabine Baum	9; 5	9; 3	9; 2
3	(England) (Germany)	Jane Martin; Karin Berière	9; 0	9; 1	9; 1
