= Orla O'Doherty =

Irish squash player (born 1971)

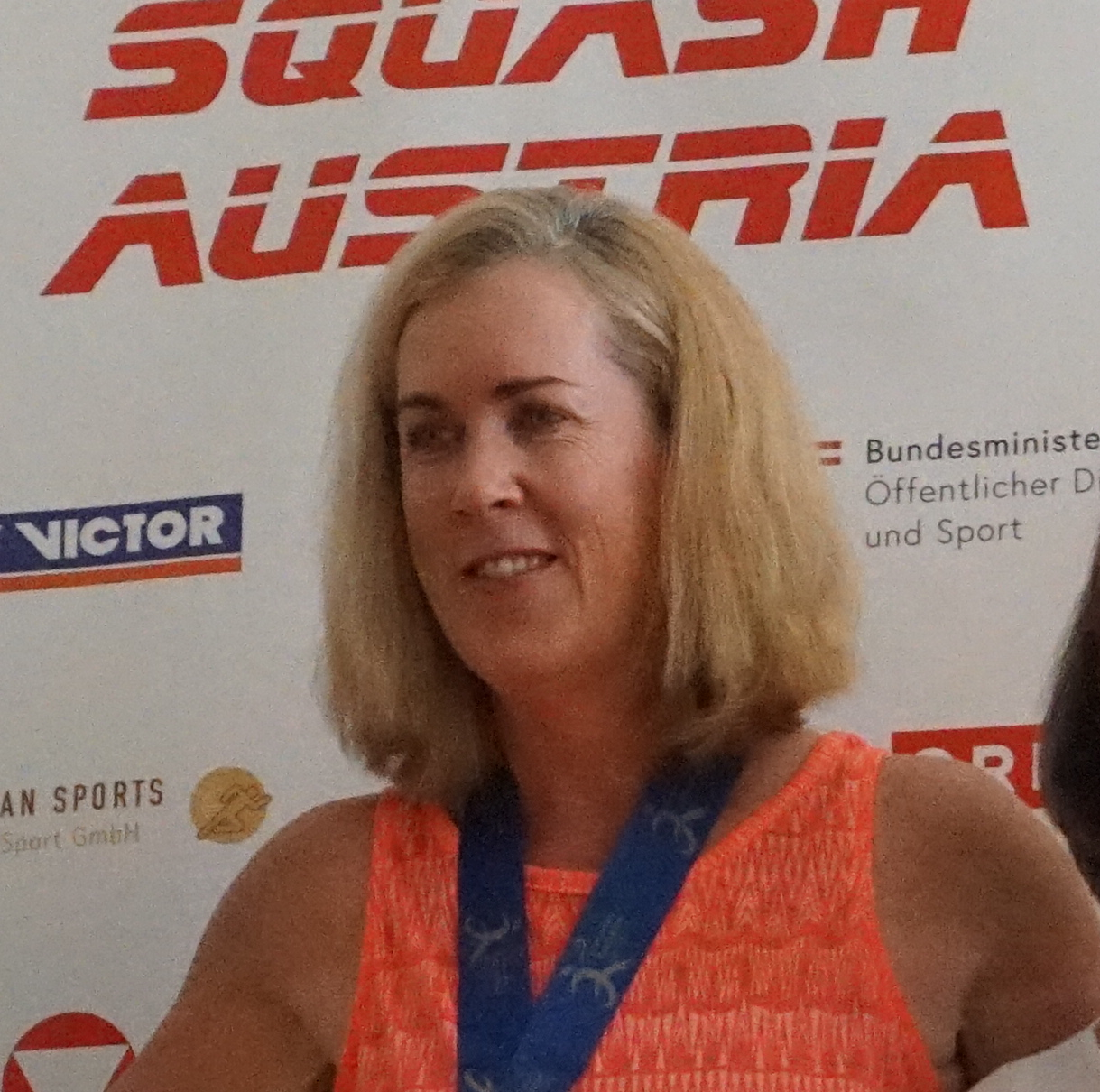
- Orla O'Doherty in August 2019
- Born: 1971 (age 54–55); Portmarnock, Dublin, Ireland
- Occupations: squash player, professional coach, personal trainer
- Spouse: Debbie Brown

Orla O'Doherty née Brown (born 1971) is a former Irish American professional squash player who also currently serves as a squash professional coach and personal trainer She played squash in Ireland during her early days as a teenager and also played in the US in her late 40s after moving to the US in 1993.

== Personal life ==
She was born and raised in Portmarnock. She lived in Ireland until her teenage and moved to the US in 1993 to pursue her squash career. Her elder brother Finbarr also played squash in national level.

She married her partner Debbie Brown, a former American national squash champion on 18 April 2015.

== Career ==
She pursued her career in squash and emerged in youth level following her triumph in Irish National Junior Squash Championships. She achieved her highest career PSA ranking of 69. After moving to the United States, she won the US National masters four times. Orla competed at the 2012 World Squash Masters along with her partner Debbie representing their nations Ireland and US respectively.

After her retirement from the sport, she founded Women Who Squash foundation in Ireland in June 2016. She is the Head Squash Coach in Portmarnock and is currently competing in the masters tour. In 2019, she won the Irish Open, British Open, Spanish Open, Slovenian Open, and European Championships. She was also selected to represent Ireland and is the oldest female squash player in history to earn an Irish cap at the European team championships. .
