= Squash at the 2005 World Games =

The squash competition at the 2005 World Games took place from July 16 to July 19 in Duisburg in Germany.

== Participating nations ==
- Australia (2)
- Austria (1)
- Canada (2)
- Denmark (1)
- Egypt (2)
- France (2)
- Germany (6)
- (United Kingdom) Great Britain (5)
- Italy (1)
- Hungary (2)
- Malaysia (2)
- Mexico (2)
- South Africa (2)
- Sweden (1)
- United States (1)

== Medals table ==
Rank	Nation	Gold	Silver	Bronze	Total
1	Great Britain (GBR)	1	0	3	4
2	Malaysia (MAS)	1	0	0	1
3	Australia (AUS)	0	1	0	1
3	France (FRA)	0	1	0	1
5	Egypt (EGY)	0	0	1	1
Totals (5 entries)		2	2	4	8

== Medals summary ==
Event	Gold	Silver	Bronze
Men's singles	(United Kingdom) Peter Nicol	(France) Thierry Lincou	(United Kingdom) Nick Matthew (United Kingdom) James Willstrop
Women's singles	(Malaysia) Nicol David	(Australia) Rachael Grinham	(Egypt) Omneya Abdel Kawy (United Kingdom) Linda Elriani
