= Debbie Brown =

American tennis/ squash player/coach

- Born: 1962 (age 63–64); South Pasadena, California, US
- Education: Long Beach State University, California
- Occupation: Multi-Racquets Sports Coach

Debbie Brown (born 1962) is a multi-racquets coach in Dublin, Ireland. She is a former American college tennis and US National champion squash player. She currently coaches tennis, padel, and pickleball. She became an Irish citizen in 2024.

== Personal life ==
She married her partner, a former Irish national squash champion on 18 April 2015. Brown is currently divorced as of 2022.

== Career ==
She started her career as a tennis player and played for Padadena City College and California State University, Long Beach. Brown later pursued her career in the sport of squash at the age of 33. She became a three time US National Champion in masters category. She has also featured in masters events in Portland, Oregon, (silver medalist) and in England and Australia.

Brown competed at the 2012 World Squash Masters in Melbourne, Australia, representing the US. She was the executive director of Santa Barbara School or Squash. She served as an assistant squash coach at the Santa Barbara Athletic Club for more than two decades.

Brown now serves as the Tennis Director at Malahide Castle Tennis in the Malahide Castle grounds, County Dublin. She is also the Padel Director at Portmarnock Sports & Leisure and conducts Adult Education pickleball classes in Portmarnock Community School.

Brown has represented Ireland in the squash Home Internationals and currently represents Ireland on the Irish National Padel Vets Team where she has competed in Four Nations and European Team Championships. In 2023 she and her partner, Marjorie Croke, came in 4th in the Open Pairs in the European Championships. Brown is the 2023 Irish National Champion in pickleball in the 4.5+ Open division with her partner, Sinead Ragonessi Browne.
