= Wembley Stadium Bowl =

Entertainment and dining venue in Wembley Park, Wembley, England

Coordinates: 51°33′29.13″N 0°17′3.53″W

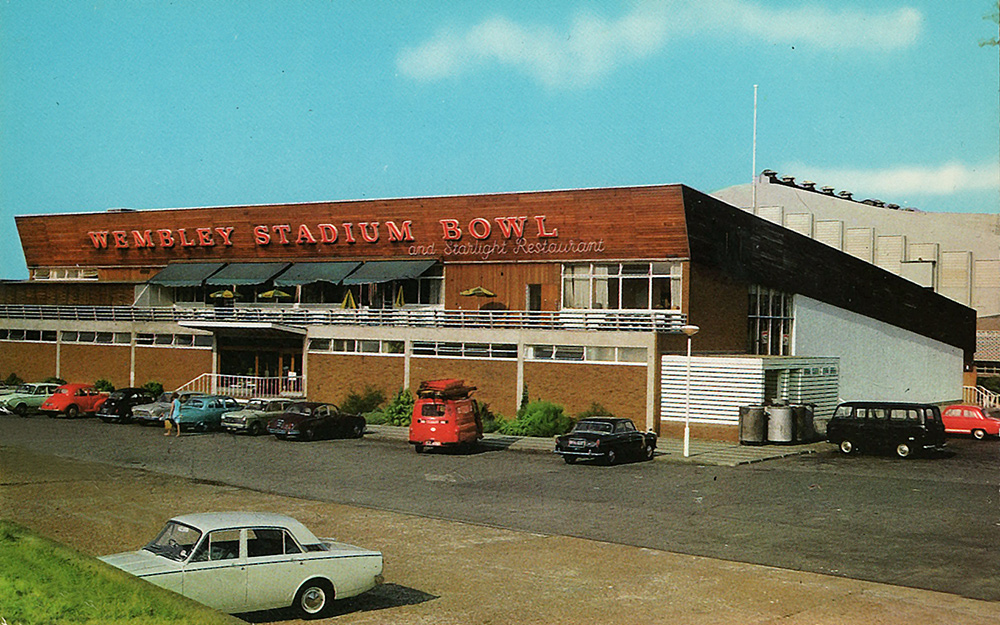
Wembley Stadium Bowl, circa 1965

The Wembley Stadium Bowl and Starlight Restaurant was an entertainment and dining venue situated just west of the Empire Pool (now the SSE Arena) in Wembley Park, Wembley, north-west London.

In the early 1960s American-style tenpin bowling alleys became popular in the UK. In 1962, a bowling alley and restaurant was built west of the Empire Pool. The Stadium Bowl boasted 24 bowling lanes.

The name Starlight for the restaurant was probably inspired by the Starlight Dance held in the neighboring Empire Pool on 17 October 1959, which was one of the first popular music events held at Wembley.

Tenpin bowling competitions were held at the Stadium Bowl, some reported on Pathé newsreels. One of these was the London International Matchplay tournament, which ran at Wembley from 1962 to 1972, before moving to the Airport Bowl in 1973. In 1966, the cup for the Coca-Cola Bottlers International Masters Championship was presented to winner John Wilcox of the USA by England football captain Bobby Moore, whose team had just won the World Cup.

The general manager in the early 1970s was called Ralph Miller.

The tenpin bowling craze declined relatively quickly and had largely died out by 1972. The Stadium Bowl became a 15-court squash centre in November 1974, hosting the British Open Squash Championships from 1975 to 1980. It has since been demolished.
