= Shabana Khan =

American squash player (born 1968)

Personal information
- Born: June 24, 1968 (age 58)

Sport
- Country: United States
- Handedness: Right Handed
- Turned pro: 1990
- Coached by: Yusuf Khan
- Retired: Yes

Women's singles
- Highest ranking: No. 23 (January 2000)
- Updated on May 2018

Shabana Khan (born 24 June 1968) is an American female former professional squash player. She reached a career-high world ranking of 23 in January 2000. She was American champion in 2001. She comes from a squash family: her father is a cousin of squash legend Jahangir Khan and her sister Latasha Khan is also a former professional squash player.
