= Jane Martin (squash player) =

English squash player (born 1972)

Personal information
- Nationality: British (English)
- Born: 1972 (age 53–54) Newcastle upon Tyne, England

Sport

Women's singles
- Highest ranking: No. 11 (January, 1998)
Medal record
Squash
Representing England
WSF World Team Squash Championships
Silver medal – second place	1998 Stuttgart	team
European Team Championships
Gold medal – first place	1996 Amsterdam	Team
Gold medal – first place	1997 Odense	Team
Gold medal – first place	1998 Helsinki	Team

Jane Martin (born 1972) is a female retired professional squash player who represented England. She reached a career high ranking of 11 in the world during January 1998.

== Biography ==
Martin reached a career-high world ranking of World No. 11 in January 1998. Martin won a silver medal at the 1998 Women's World Team Squash Championships and is an eleven times winner of the Northumbria SRA County Championship.

Martin represented the 1998 England team in the women's doubles event, at the 1998 Commonwealth Games in Kuala Lumpur, Malaysia.

Martin won three consecutive gold medals for the England women's national squash team at the European Squash Team Championships from 1996 to 1998.

She was appointed as Central Regional Coach by Scottish Squash in 2018 and has been the resident coach at the Bridge of Allan Sports Club since 2006.
