= Eva Svenby =

Swedish squash player (born 1969)

Personal information
- Born: 11 June 1969 (age 57) Lund, Sweden

Sport
- Country: Sweden
- Handedness: Left Handed
- Retired: Yes

Women's singles
- Updated on May 2018

Eva Svenby (born 11 June 1969) is a female Swedish former professional squash player who represented Sweden. She reached a career-high world ranking of 12 in March 1982.

Svenby was born in Lund, and was Swedish champion a record 9 times.
