= Senga Macfie =

Scottish squash player

Personal information
- Nationality: British (Scottish/English)
- Born: 18 October 1968 (age 57) Hendon, London, England
- Years active: 1993–2010

Sport
- Handedness: right-handed
- Turned pro: 1993
- Highest ranking: 16 (January 1995)

Senga Jane Macfie also spelt as Senga MacFie (born 18 October 1968) is an English-born former professional squash player who represented Scotland. She represented the Scotland national women's squash team in several international competitions including the British Open Squash Championships, World Open Squash Championships and in World Team Squash Championships in a career spanning from 1993 to 2010. She achieved her career-high PSA ranking of World No. 16 in January 1995 during the 1995 PSA World Tour.

== Career ==
Macfie represented England women's junior team until 1992 before switching to play for Scotland. She emerged as winner of the 1984 British Junior Open Squash in women's U16 category and emerged as runners-up to England's Sue Wright at the 1986 British Junior Open Squash in women's U19 category. Macfie won the inaugural European Squash Individual Championships was held in 1990 and joined the Professional Squash Association in 1993, competing at the PSA World Tour until 2002.

Macfie represented the 1998 Scottish team at the 1998 Commonwealth Games in Kuala Lumpur, Malaysia, where she competed in three events.

Macfie was also part of the Scottish team which emerged as runners-up to England at the 2002 European Squash Team Championships. Macfie won five national titles at the Scottish National Squash Championships in 1995, 2001, 2008, 2011 and 2013. In 2023, she was runner-up Scottish Nationals.

After retiring from playing professionally, she coached squash at Abercorn Sports Club in Edinburgh.
