= Lisa Opie =

British squash player

Lisa Opie MBE
Personal information
- Born: 15 August 1963 (age 62) Guernsey, Channel Islands, UK

Sport
- Country: England; Guernsey
- Handedness: Right Handed
- Turned pro: 1984
- Retired: 1995

Women's singles
- Highest ranking: No. 1 (March 1988)
Medal record
Women's squash
Representing England
World Championships
Silver medal – second place	1985 Dublin	Singles
Silver medal – second place	1987 Auckland	Singles
Bronze medal – third place	1981 Toronto	Singles
European Team Championships
Gold medal – first place	1981 Amsterdam	Team
Gold medal – first place	1982 Cardiff	Team
Gold medal – first place	1987 Vienna	Team
Gold medal – first place	1988 Warmond	Team

Lisa Jane Opie MBE (born on 15 August 1963) is a retired British squash player, who was one of the game's leading woman players in the 1980s and early 1990s. Her biggest successes were winning the British Open in 1991 and four consecutive World Team Championships from 1985 to 1990. Until the rise of Cassie Campion, Lisa was England's number 1 player.

== Biography ==
Born and raised in Guernsey in the Channel Islands, she was coached in her early years in the game by Reg Harbour. In international competition, she represented England. She was appointed Member of the Order of the British Empire (MBE) for services to squash in the 1995 New Year Honours. In later years she was coached by Gavin Dupre from Jersey. They began working together in Guernsey and Lisa later spent time training with him in Germany where he was based as a professional coach.

Lisa won her first tournament in 1979 and quickly established herself as one of the game's best players. She reached the 1981 World Open semi-final but lost to Rhonda Thorne 9–2, 9–0, 9–4. This was to be the first in a series of near-misses for Lisa, as she reached two World Open finals but lost both times to the New Zealand squash legend Susan Devoy – in 1985 (9–4, 9–5, 10–8) and 1987 (9–3, 10–8, 9–2).

The British Open also provided much heartbreak. In 1982 and 1983 she lost in the final against the Australian Vicki Cardwell, and twice against old foe Devoy, in 1984 (5–9, 9–0, 9–7, 9–1) and 1986 (9–4, 9–2, 9–3). However, she eventually won the British Open in 1991 when she beat compatriot Sue Wright in the final 6–9, 9–3, 9–3, 9–4. This made her the first British woman to win the title in 30 years. That same year she finished second in the British Sports Journalists Award, with the athlete Liz McColgan coming first.

Opie won four gold medals for the England women's national squash team at the European Squash Team Championships in 1981, 1982, 1987 and 1988.

== World Open ==
=== Finals: 2 (0 title, 2 runners-up) ===
Outcome	Year	Location	Opponent in the final	Score in the final
Runner-up	1985 Women's World Open Squash Championship	Dublin, Ireland	(New Zealand) Susan Devoy	9–4, 9–5, 10–8
Runner-up	1987 Women's World Open Squash Championship	Auckland, New Zealand	(New Zealand) Susan Devoy	9–3, 10–8, 9–2

== British Open ==
=== Finals: 5 (1 title, 4 runners-up) ===
Outcome	Year	Location	Opponent in the final	Score in the final
Runner-up	1982 Women's British Open Squash Championship	Bromley, England	(Australia) Vicki Cardwell	9–4, 5–9, 9–4, 9–4
Runner-up	1983 Women's British Open Squash Championship	Derby, England	(Australia) Vicki Cardwell	9–10, 9–6, 9–4, 9–5
Runner-up	1984 Women's British Open Squash Championship	Wembley, England	(New Zealand) Susan Devoy	5–9, 9–0, 9–7, 9–1
Runner-up	1986 Women's British Open Squash Championship	Wembley, England	(New Zealand) Susan Devoy	9–4, 9–2, 9–3
Winner	1991 Women's British Open Squash Championship	London, England	(England) Sue Wright	6–9, 9–3, 9–3, 9–4

== World Team Championships ==
=== Finals: 6 (4 titles, 2 runner-up) ===
Outcome	Year	Location	Opponent in the final	Score in the final
Winner	1985 Women's World Team Squash Championships	Dublin, Ireland	New Zealand	2–1
Winner	1987 Women's World Team Squash Championships	Auckland, New Zealand	Australia	2–1
Winner	1989 Women's World Team Squash Championships	Warmond, Netherlands	Australia	3–0
Winner	1990 Women's World Team Squash Championships	Sydney	Australia	2–1
Runner-up	1981 Women's World Team Squash Championships	Toronto, Canada	Australia	2–1
Runner-up	1983 Women's World Team Squash Championships	Perth, Australia	Australia	2–1

Sporting positions
Preceded by Michelle Martin	World No. 1 March 1988 – April 1988	Succeeded by Michelle Martin
