= Michelle Martin =

Australian squash player (born 1967)

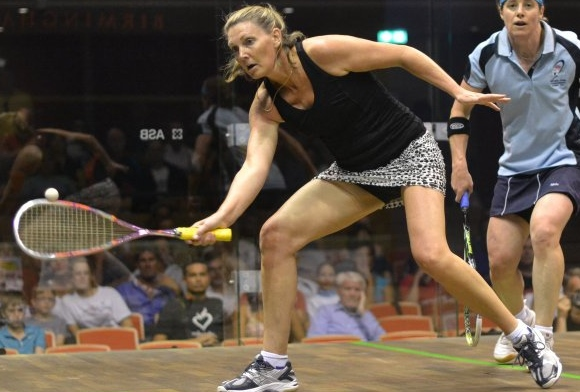
- Martin (left) during the World Masters 2012

Personal information
- Full name: Michelle Susan Martin
- Born: 29 April 1967 (age 59) Sydney
- Height: 1.75 m (5 ft 9 in)

Sport
- Country: Australia
- Handedness: Right-handed
- Retired: 1999

Women's singles
- Highest ranking: No. 1 (March 1993)
- World Open: W (1993, 1994, 1995)
Medal record
Women's squash
Representing Australia
World Championships
Gold medal – first place	1993 Johannesburg	Singles
Gold medal – first place	1994 Saint Peter Port	Singles
Gold medal – first place	1995 Hong Kong	Singles
Silver medal – second place	1992 Vancouver	Singles
Silver medal – second place	1997 Sydney	Singles
Silver medal – second place	1998 Stuttgart	Singles
Silver medal – second place	1999 Seattle	Singles
World Team Championships
Gold medal – first place	1994 Saint Peter Port	Team
Gold medal – first place	1998 Stuttgart	Team
Commonwealth Games
Gold medal – first place	1998 Kuala Lumpur	Singles
Gold medal – first place	1998 Kuala Lumpur	Mixed doubles
- Updated on 6 March 2010

Michelle Susan Martin OAM (born 29 April 1967) is an Australian former professional squash player who was one of the game's leading players in the 1990s. She was ranked number one in the world from 1993 to 1996 and again in 1998 and 1999, and won three World Open titles and six British Open titles.

== Early life ==
Martin was born on 29 April 1967 in Sydney, as the fourth of six children. Her older brothers Brett and Rodney also went on to be top professional players. Her parents, who had built the Engadine Squash Centre below their family home, introduced her to the game when she was three years old. She would often play squash with her family after school, and at the age of eight, she came second in the state under-13s championship. She moved with her family to Brisbane in 1980, and attended Everton Park State High School.

== Career ==
She joined the Australian Institute of Sport's squash unit shortly after its establishment in 1985, and was part of the program for the rest of the 1980s; her coaches there included squash champions Geoff Hunt and Heather McKay. After working in a bank, she began her professional squash career in 1987, competing in her first of six World Team Squash Championships in that year; she went on to participate in all of them during her career except the 1989 championship.

In early 1990, Martin was considering giving up the sport due to lack of progress (her world ranking had been steady at No. 6 for some years), until her uncle Lionel Robberds began coaching her, providing her with a rigorous training program of running, gym work and physical drills. Her confidence in her game and world ranking began to increase. In late 1990, she met Phil Harte, who was to be her manager from then until 1992. Harte suggested that, rather than wearing the traditional shirt and skirt during squash games, she should wear a two-piece lycra suit because it was "something sexy" that would "shake up the squash world" and gain publicity for her in the process. She agreed to do so, which caused much controversy. Fellow squash player Danielle Drady, who was married to Martin's brother Rodney, later left him for Harte, who became her manager and similarly had her dress in glad wrap for publicity. Rodney became Martin's coach in 1998.

She spent 44 months as the best women's squash player in the world from March 1993 to October 1996 before Cassie Jackman of England broke her dominance; she was also ranked number one in the world in 1998 and 1999. She won three consecutive World Open championships from 1993 to 1995, and was a finalist in all the World Opens from 1992 to 1999 except 1996; she also won six consecutive British Opens from 1993 to 1998. She represented her country at the 1996 and 1999 Squash World Cups, and won gold medals in the sport at the 1998 Kuala Lumpur Commonwealth Games in the women's singles and mixed doubles. She also won the Australian Open in 1991, 1993, 1994, 1995, 1996, 1998, and 1999. At the end of 1999 she announced her retirement, saying she had achieved all her goals in the sport. She worked as a manager and coach of the Australian women's junior and senior teams from 2003 to 2016.

=== World Open ===
==== Finals: 7 (3 titles, 4 runners-up) ====
Outcome	Year	Location	Opponent in the final	Score in the final
Runner-up	1992 Women's World Open Squash Championship	Vancouver, Canada	(New Zealand) Susan Devoy	9–4, 9–6, 9–4
Winner	1993 Women's World Open Squash Championship	Johannesburg, South Africa	(Australia) Liz Irving	9–2, 9–2, 9–1
Winner	1994 Women's World Open Squash Championship	Saint Peter Port, Guernsey	(England) Cassie Jackman	9–1, 9–0, 9–6
Winner	1995 Women's World Open Squash Championship	Hong Kong	(Australia) Sarah Fitz-Gerald	8–10, 9–2, 9–6, 9–3
Runner-up	1997 Women's World Open Squash Championship	Sydney, Australia	(Australia) Sarah Fitz-Gerald	9–5, 5–9, 6–9, 9–2, 9–3
Runner-up	1998 Women's World Open Squash Championship	Stuttgart, Germany	(Australia) Sarah Fitz-Gerald	10–8, 9–7, 2–9, 3–9, 10–9
Runner-up	1999 Women's World Open Squash Championship	Seattle, United States	(England) Cassie Campion	9–6, 9–7, 9–7

=== World Team Championships ===
==== Finals: 6 (4 title, 2 runner-up) ====
Outcome	Year	Location	Opponent in the final	Score in the final
Runner-up	1987 Women's World Team Squash Championships	Auckland, New Zealand	England	2–1
Runner-up	1990 Women's World Team Squash Championships	Sydney, Australia	England	2–1
Winner	1992 Women's World Team Squash Championships	Vancouver, Canada	New Zealand	2–1
Winner	1994 Women's World Team Squash Championships	Saint Peter Port, Guernsey	England	3–0
Winner	1996 Women's World Team Squash Championships	Petaling Jaya, Malaysia	England	2–1
Winner	1998 Women's World Team Squash Championships	Stuttgart, Germany	England	3–0

== Personal life ==
Martin was married to Stephen Lacy, who was also her manager when she played professional squash, and the couple has two sons.

== Recognition ==
In 1994, Martin was named New South Wales Sportswoman of the Year. She was inducted into the Australian Squash Hall of Fame in 1995 and was upgraded to Legend status in 2011; she was also inducted into the New South Wales Sports Hall of Champions in 1998, the Women's Squash Hall of Fame in 2000, and the Queensland Sports Hall of Fame in 2009. She received an Australian Sports Medal in 2000 and a Medal of the Order of Australia in 2013. She was inducted into the World Squash Hall of Fame, the Sport Australia Hall of Fame, and the Australian Institute of Sport "Best of the Best" in 2001.

== See also ==
- List of WISPA number 1 ranked players
- Official Women's Squash World Ranking

Sporting positions
Preceded by Susan Devoy; Sarah Fitz-Gerald	World No. 1 May 1993 – October 1996; November 1998 – December 1999	Succeeded by Sarah Fitz-Gerald; Cassie Jackman
