= Martine Le Moignan =

English squash player

Martine Le Moignan MBE
Personal information
- Born: 28 October 1962 (age 63) Guernsey, Channel Islands

Sport
- Country: England; Guernsey
- Handedness: Left Handed
- Turned pro: 1984

Women's singles
- Highest ranking: No. 3 (November, 1987)
- World Open: W (1989)
Medal record
Women's squash
Representing England
World Championships
Gold medal – first place	1989 Warmond	Singles
Silver medal – second place	1990 Sydney	Singles
Bronze medal – third place	1985 Dublin	Singles
Bronze medal – third place	1992 Vancouver	Singles
Bronze medal – third place	1993 Johannesburg	Singles
European Team Championships
Gold medal – first place	1981 Amsterdam	Team
Gold medal – first place	1982 Cardiff	Team
Gold medal – first place	1983 Munich	Team
Gold medal – first place	1986 Aix-en-Provence	Team
Gold medal – first place	1987 Vienna	Team
Gold medal – first place	1988 Warmond	Team
Gold medal – first place	1989 Helsinki	Team
Gold medal – first place	1991 Gelsenkirchen	Team
Gold medal – first place	1992 Aix-en-Provence	Team

Martine Le Moignan MBE (born 28 October 1962, in Guernsey, Channel Islands) is an English former professional squash player, who was one of the game's leading players in the 1980s and early-1990s. In international competition, she represented England.

== Biography ==
Le Moignan was coached by Reg Harbour at the beginning of her career.

Le Moignan won the World Open in 1989, defeating Susan Devoy of New Zealand in the final 4–9, 9–4, 10–8, 10–8. She was also runner-up at the World Open in 1990, and runner-up at the British Open in 1985, 1989 and 1992. Le Moignan won four consecutive World Team Championships from 1985 to 1990.

Le Moignan won nine gold medals for the England women's national squash team at the European Squash Team Championships from 1981 to 1992.

She was appointed a Member of the Order of the British Empire (MBE) in the 1990 New Year Honours for services to squash.

== Major results ==
=== World Open ===
Finals: 2 (1 title, 1 runner-up)

Outcome	Year	Location	Opponent in the final	Score in the final
Winner	1989 Women's World Open Squash Championship	Warmond, Netherlands	(New Zealand) Susan Devoy	4–9, 9–4, 10–8, 10–8
Runner-up	1990 Women's World Open Squash Championship	Sydney, Australia	(New Zealand) Susan Devoy	9–4, 9–4, 9–4

=== World Team Championships ===
Finals: 6 (4 titles, 2 runner-up)

Outcome	Year	Location	Opponent in the final	Score in the final
Winner	1985 Women's World Team Squash Championships	Dublin, Ireland	New Zealand	2-1
Winner	1987 Women's World Team Squash Championships	Auckland, New Zealand	Australia	2-1
Winner	1989 Women's World Team Squash Championships	Warmond, Netherlands	Australia	3-0
Winner	1990 Women's World Team Squash Championships	Sydney, Australia	Australia	2-1
Runner-up	1983 Women's World Team Squash Championships	Perth, Australia	Australia	2-1
Runner-up	1994 Women's World Team Squash Championships	Saint Peter Port, Guernsey	Australia	3-0

=== British Open ===
Finals: 3 (0 title, 3 runners-up)

Outcome	Year	Location	Opponent in the final	Score in the final
Runner-up	1985 Women's British Open Squash Championship	East Grinstead, England	(New Zealand) Susan Devoy	9–6, 5–9, 9–6, 9–5
Runner-up	1989 Women's British Open Squash Championship	Wembley, England	(New Zealand) Susan Devoy	9–6, 5–9, 9–6, 9–5
Runner-up	1992 Women's British Open Squash Championship	Wembley, England	(New Zealand) Susan Devoy	9–3, 9–5, 9–3
