= Linda Elriani =

British squash player and coach

Linda Elriani (née Charman)
Personal information
- Nationality: British (English)
- Born: 21 November 1971 (age 54) Eastbourne, England

Sport
- Turned pro: 1990
- Retired: 2006
- Racquet used: Karakal

Women's singles
- Highest ranking: No. 3 (January 2000)
Medal record
Women's squash
Representing Great Britain
World Games
Bronze medal – third place	2005 Duisburg	Singles
Representing England
World Championships
Bronze medal – third place	2001 Melbourne	Singles
Bronze medal – third place	2002 Doha	Singles
World Team Championships
Gold medal – first place	2000 Sheffield	Team
Silver medal – second place	1996 Petaling Jaya	Team
Silver medal – second place	1998 Stuttgart	Team
Silver medal – second place	2002 Odense	Team
Silver medal – second place	2004 Amsterdam	Team
Commonwealth Games
Bronze medal – third place	2002 Manchester	Doubles
European Team Championships
Gold medal – first place	1997 Odense	Team
Gold medal – first place	1998 Helsinki	Team
Gold medal – first place	2000 Vienna	Team
Gold medal – first place	2001 Eindhoven	Team
Gold medal – first place	2002 Böblingen	Team
Gold medal – first place	2003 Nottingham	Team
Gold medal – first place	2004 Rennes	Team
Gold medal – first place	2005 Amsterdam	Team
Gold medal – first place	2006 Vienna	Team

Linda Elriani (née Charman; born 21 November 1971) is a squash coach and former professional squash player from England. She reached a career high ranking of 3 in the world during January 2000.

== Biography ==
As a player, Charman turned professional in 1990. She appeared in 32 professional tour finals, winning 15 titles. She also won the British National Championship title in 2005. She reached a career-high world ranking of World No. 3 in 2000 and was the captain of the England team which won the World Team Squash Championships in 2000.

Charman represented the 1998 England team at the 1998 Commonwealth Games in Kuala Lumpur, Malaysia, where she competed in the women's singles and doubles. At the 2002 Commonwealth Games in Manchester, she won a bronze medal for the 2002 England team in the women's doubles, partnering Fiona Geaves.

Elriani won nine gold medals for the England women's national squash team at the European Squash Team Championships from 1997 to 2006. She won two of them under the name Linda Charman-Smith (2001 and 2002) and the final two wins were played under her married name of Linda Elriani.

Elriani retired from the professional tour in 2006.

She is married to the French squash player Laurent Elriani. Laurent was honored as the United States Olympic Committee National Coach of the Year in 2017, for coaching an incredible quartet of young squash players, which included the reigning U19 and U17 boy's champions and the number 1 ranked U19 and U17 boys. Laurent has been a lead coach on the US Squash annual trip to the British Junior Open.

== World Team Championships ==
=== Finals: 5 (1 title, 4 runner-up) ===
Outcome	Year	Location	Opponent in the final	Score in the final
Runner-up	1996 Women's World Team Squash Championships	Petaling Jaya, Malaysia	Australia	2-1
Runner-up	1998 Women's World Team Squash Championships	Stuttgart, Germany	Australia	3-0
Winner	2000 Women's World Team Squash Championships	Sheffield, England	Australia	2-1
Runner-up	2002 Women's World Team Squash Championships	Odense, Denmark	Australia	2-1
Runner-up	2004 Women's World Team Squash Championships	Amsterdam, Netherlands	Australia	2-0

== See also ==
- Official Women's Squash World Ranking
