= Lucy Soutter =

English squash player (born 1967)

Personal information
- Born: 17 March 1967 (age 59) Cirencester, Gloucestershire, England

Sport
- Country: England
- Highest ranking: No. 3 (May 1986)
Medal record
Women's squash
Representing England
World Championships
Bronze medal – third place	1985 Dublin	Singles
European Team Championships
Gold medal – first place	1985 Barcelona	Team
Gold medal – first place	1986 Aix-en-Provence	Team
Gold medal – first place	1989 Helsinki	Team
Gold medal – first place	1991 Gelsenkirchen	Team

Lucy Soutter (born 17 March 1967) is a former professional squash player from England. She was part of the successful England team that won the 1987 Women's World Team Squash Championships in Auckland, New Zealand and the 1990 Women's World Team Squash Championships in Perth, Australia.

== Biography ==
Soutter was runner-up at the British Open in 1987, where she lost in the final to Susan Devoy of New Zealand 2–9, 4–9, 9–4, 9–2, 9–1. She won the British National Squash Championship title in 1983, 1985 and 1989. In 1984, a then 17-year-old and British Junior champion, Soutter won the ICI Perspex World Masters title, beating the World no. 1, Susan Devoy, 9-0, 2-9, 9-2, 6-9, 9-5.

Soutter won four gold medals for the England women's national squash team at the European Squash Team Championships in 1985, 1986, 1989 and 1991.
