= Cassie Jackman =

English squash player (born 1972)

Cassie Jackman MBE
Personal information
- Nationality: British (English)
- Born: 22 December 1972 (age 53) North Walsham, England

Sport
- Handedness: Right Handed
- Turned pro: 1990
- Retired: 2004
- Racquet used: Prince

Women's singles
- Highest ranking: No. 1 (January 2000)
Medal record
Women's squash
Representing England
World Championships
Gold medal – first place	1999 Seattle	Singles
Silver medal – second place	1994 Saint Peter Port	Singles
Silver medal – second place	1996 Petaling Jaya	Singles
Silver medal – second place	2003 Hong Kong	Singles
Bronze medal – third place	1992 Vancouver	Singles
Bronze medal – third place	1995 Hong Kong	Singles
World Team Championships
Silver medal – second place	1994 Saint Peter Port	Team
Silver medal – second place	1996 Petaling Jaya	Team
Silver medal – second place	2004 Amsterdam	Team
Bronze medal – third place	1992 Vancouver	Team
World Doubles Championships
Silver medal – second place	1997 Hong Kong	Doubles
Silver medal – second place	1997 Hong Kong	Mixed doubles
Commonwealth Games
Gold medal – first place	1998 Kuala Lumpur	Doubles
Silver medal – second place	2002 Manchester	Doubles
Bronze medal – third place	1998 Kuala Lumpur	Singles
Bronze medal – third place	2002 Manchester	Singles

Cassandra Jackman MBE (born 22 December 1972 and competing in some years as Cassie Campion) is an English former squash player who won the World Open in 1999. She was England's leading player throughout much of the 1990s and the first few years of the 21st century.

Jackman was appointed Member of the Order of the British Empire (MBE) in the 2004 Birthday Honours for services to squash.

== Biography ==
Born in North Walsham, Norfolk, she won five British under-23 titles, and five senior British national titles.

She represented England at four World Team Championships in 1992 in Vancouver, 1994 in Saint Peter Port, Guernsey, 1996 in Malaysia and 2004 in Amsterdam.

She lost the 1996 World Open final to Sarah Fitz-Gerald 9–4, 9–2, 4–9, 9–6 who would go on to win another four World Opens.

Jackman represented the 1998 England team at the 1998 Commonwealth Games in Kuala Lumpur, Malaysia. She competed in the singles and doubles, winning bronze in the singles and gold in the doubles with Sue Wright.

In 1999 she won the World Open title.

Jackman went to the Commonwealth Games again when she represented the 2002 England team at the 2002 Commonwealth Games in Manchester, England, where she competed in the singles and doubles and won a bronze medal in the singles, and a silver medal in the doubles partnering Tania Bailey.

Jackman won 13 gold medals for the England women's national squash team at the European Squash Team Championships, spanning 1990 to 2004. Two of these were played under the name Cassie Campion.

She retired due to a recurring back injury in December 2004.

== See also ==
- List of WISPA number 1 ranked players
- Official Women's Squash World Ranking
