= Danielle Drady =

Australian squash player (born 1967)

Personal information
- Born: 13 October 1967 (age 58) Sydney

Sport
- Country: Australia
- Turned pro: 1987
- Highest ranking: 2 (March 1990)
Medal record
Woman squash
Representing Australia
World Championships
Bronze medal – third place	1990 Sydney	Singles
- Updated on July 2017

Danielle Harte (née Drady, also Dradey-Hart, formerly Martin; born 13 October 1967) is an Australian former professional squash player, who was ranked the World No. 2 women's player in March 1990.

== Biography ==
Drady is a Māori Australian from the Ngāti Maru iwi (tribe). Her mother Prue Drady migrated to Australia in 1961 from the Wātene family Mātai Whetu marae near Thames on the Coromandel Peninsula of New Zealand's North Island. She is a cousin of Hemi Taylor, a rugby union player for the Wales national team.

Born in Sydney and growing up in the Gold Coast, she became interested in squash as a young child when she started tagging along with her mother to her twice-weekly social squash gatherings at a local club. She won the Queensland under-12 championship in 1978, and then went on to claim state and national championships and an under-19 world team crown in her junior years. In 1984, she joined the Australian Institute of Sport in Brisbane.

Drady turned professional in 1987, and began to steadily climb the world rankings. Having reached the World No. 2 ranking in 1991, the World No. 1 spot appeared to be within Drady's reach. However, her chances were dashed when she snapped her Achilles tendon during a practice match. The injury required immediate surgery and kept her out of the game for some time. She married one of the top men's players, Rodney Martin, with whom she had been in a long-term relationship, in 1993, but their marriage ended the next year after she left him for his manager Phil Harte. In a bid to attract attention and sponsorship for her comeback from injury, and to promote the world's first outdoor squash tournament in 1994, Harte (who had become her manager and later her husband) wrapped her in glad wrap to play her matches outside Sydney's Martin Place shopping centre in 1994. She played and won the World Outdoor Pro-Am wrapped in plastic, and posed for photographs with a 'For Sale' sign strung around her neck. This created a great deal of media coverage and sparked debate about the lengths female athletes should and need to go to in order to attract funding and sponsors. The publicity soon led to her becoming the most sponsored player in squash for a period. Harte had previously managed Rodney Martin's sister Michelle Martin and similarly had her play squash while dressed in a Lycra suit for publicity.

She continued to play top-level squash into the late 1990s, having won the Australian Open in 1996 and the 1998 World Open Pro-AM Sydney. However, her international career began to take a backseat following her marriage to Harte and the birth of their daughter. Between 2010 and 2015, she established the first squash and fitness academy at the Emirates Golf and Country Club in Dubai. As of 2018, she lives between Sydney and Dubai. She and her husband run Harte International Events Manager. She also manages an international lifestyle and travel magazine called Classic Lifestyle and has been a professional photographer since 2004.

== Recognition ==
Drady was inducted into the Gold Coast Sport Hall of Fame in 1999.
