= Liz Irving =

Australian squash player and coach

Personal information
- Born: 7 February 1965 (age 61) Brisbane

Sport
- Country: Australia

Women's Singles
- Highest ranking: 2 (1998)
- World Open: RU (1993)
Medal record
Women's squash
Representing Australia
World Championships
Silver medal – second place	1993 Johannesburg	Singles
Bronze medal – third place	1987 Auckland	Singles
Bronze medal – third place	1989 Warmond	Singles
Bronze medal – third place	1996 Petaling Jaya	Singles
World Team Championships
Gold medal – first place	1992 Vancouver	Team
Gold medal – first place	1994 Saint Peter Port	Team
Gold medal – first place	1996 Petaling Jaya	Team
Gold medal – first place	1998 Stuttgart	Team
Silver medal – second place	1989 Warmond	Team
Silver medal – second place	1990 Sydney	Team
World Doubles Championships
Gold medal – first place	1997 Hong Kong	Mixed doubles

Liz Irving (born 7 February 1965 in Brisbane, Queensland) is an Australian squash coach and former player.

Irving was runner-up to her fellow Australian player Michelle Martin at the World Open in 1993. She was also a three-time finalist at the British Open, losing the final to New Zealand's Susan Devoy in 1988, and to Martin in 1994 and 1995. Irving won the mixed doubles titles at the inaugural World Doubles Squash Championships in 1997 (partner Dan Jenson). She reached a career-high ranking of World No. 2 in 1988.

Her greatest successes came in four consecutive World Team Championships when she was part of the winning Australian team during the 1992 Women's World Team Squash Championships held in Vancouver, British Columbia, Canada, the 1994 Women's World Team Squash Championships held in Saint Peter Port, Guernsey, the 1996 Women's World Team Squash Championships held in Malaysia and the 1998 Women's World Team Squash Championships held in Germany.

Since retiring as a player, Irving has settled in Amsterdam, where she has coached top international female players, including Nicol David and Vanessa Atkinson.

== World Open ==
=== Finals: 1 (0 title, 1 runner-up) ===
Outcome	Year	Location	Opponent in the final	Score in the final
Runner-up	1993 Women's World Open Squash Championship	South Africa	(Australia) Michelle Martin	9–2, 9–2, 9–1

== World Team Championships ==
=== Finals: 6 (4 title, 2 runner-up) ===
Outcome	Year	Location	Opponent in the final	Score in the final
Runner-up	1989 Women's World Team Squash Championships	Netherlands	England	3–0
Runner-up	1990 Women's World Team Squash Championships	Australia	England	2–1
Winner	1992 Women's World Team Squash Championships	Canada	New Zealand	2–1
Winner	1994 Women's World Team Squash Championships	Guernsey	England	3–0
Winner	1996 Women's World Team Squash Championships	Malaysia	England	2–1
Winner	1998 Women's World Team Squash Championships	Stuttgart, Germany	England	3–0
