= Heather Wallace =

Squash player (born 1961)

Personal information
- Nationality: Scottish/Canadian
- Born: 4 December 1961 (age 64) Kitwe, Zambia

Sport
Medal record
Women's squash
Representing Canada
Pan American Games
Gold medal – first place	1995 Mar del Plata	Singles

Heather Wallace (born 4 December 1961) is a former professional female squash player who represented the Scottish and Canadian national teams during her career. She reached a career-high world ranking of World No. 6 in July 1993.

== Biography ==
She represented Scotland during 1981 Women's World Team Squash Championships and was a four-time Scottish champion, winning the National Championships in 1982, 1983, 1984 and 1985.

Heather retired from competitive squash in 1998.
