= Robyn Lambourne =

Australian squash player (born 1964)

Robyn Lambourne (née Friday)
Personal information
- Born: 24 July 1964 (age 62) Narrogin

Sport
- Country: Australia
- Turned pro: 1987
- Highest ranking: 2 (January 1992)
Medal record
Women's squash
Representing Australia
World Championships
Bronze medal – third place	1990 Sydney	Singles
- Updated on August 2017

Robyn Lambourne (née Friday, born 24 July 1964, in Narrogin, Australia) is an Australian former squash player. In 1991, she was ranked as the number 2 player in the world, her highest career singles rankings.

She became a Junior Squash world champion in the women's individual event defeating her Australian compatriot Helen Paradeiser in the finals at the 1983 World Junior Squash Championships. Robyn Lambourne also became the first Australian woman to win a Junior Squash World Championship title.

Her greatest success came in 1992 when she was part of the winning Australian team during the 1992 Women's World Team Squash Championships held in Vancouver, Canada. And her career ended shortly after that.
