= Sue Wright =

English squash player (born 1970)

Personal information
- Nationality: British (English)
- Born: 28 June 1970 (age 56)

Sport
- Retired: 2001

Women's singles
- Highest ranking: No. 3 (January, 1998)
Medal record
Women's squash
Representing England
World Championships
Bronze medal – third place	1996 Petaling Jaya	Singles
Bronze medal – third place	1997 Sydney	Singles
Bronze medal – third place	1998 Stuttgart	Singles
World Team Championships
Silver medal – second place	1994 Saint Peter Port	Team
Silver medal – second place	1998 Stuttgart	Team
Bronze medal – third place	1992 Vancouver	Team
World Doubles Championships
Silver medal – second place	1997 Hong Kong	Doubles
Commonwealth Games
Gold medal – first place	1998 Kuala Lumpur	Doubles
Bronze medal – third place	1998 Kuala Lumpur	Singles
European Team Championships
Gold medal – first place	1990 Zurich	Team
Gold medal – first place	1992 Aix-en-Provence	Team
Gold medal – first place	1993 Aix-en-Provence	Team
Gold medal – first place	1995 Amsterdam	Team
Gold medal – first place	1997 Odense	Team
Gold medal – first place	1998 Helsinki	Team

Sue Wright married name Rose (born 28 June 1970) is a former professional squash player from England. She reached a career high ranking of 3 in the world during January 1998 and won a gold medal at the Commonwealth Games.

== Biography ==
Wright was runner-up at the British Open in 1991 and 2000, and reached a career-high ranking of World No. 3 in 1998. She won the British National Championship title four times, in 1992, 1997, 1998 and 2001. As a junior player, Wright captained the England team which won the world junior team title in 1987.

She represented England at the 1992 Women's World Team Squash Championships in Vancouver, British Columbia, Canada, (winning bronze), the 1994 Women's World Team Squash Championships in Saint Peter Port, Guernsey (winning silver), and the 1998 Women's World Team Squash Championships in Stuttgart, Germany, (winning silver).

Wright represented the 1998 England team at the 1998 Commonwealth Games in Kuala Lumpur, Malaysia. She competed in the singles and doubles, winning bronze in the singles and gold in the doubles with Cassie Jackman.

Wright won six gold medals for the England women's national squash team at the European Squash Team Championships from 1990 to 1998.

Wright retired from professional squash in 2001.

During the last few years of her career, Wright suffered from viral pneumonia, which left her with ear problems that prevented her from flying and competing outside the United Kingdom.

== World Team Championships ==
=== Finals: 2 (0 title, 2 runner-up) ===
Outcome	Year	Location	Opponent in the final	Score in the final
Runner-up	1994 Women's World Team Squash Championships	Saint Peter Port, Guernsey	Australia	3-0
Runner-up	1998 Women's World Team Squash Championships	Stuttgart, Germany	Australia	3-0
