= Rebecca Best =

English-born Irish squash player (born 1964)

Rebecca Best Rebecca O' Callaghan
Personal information
- Born: 18 January 1964 (age 62) Sheffield, England

Sport
- Handedness: Right Handed
- Retired: Yes

Women's singles
- Highest ranking: No. 6 (July 1988)
Medal record
Women's squash
Representing Ireland
European Team Championships
Silver medal – second place	1986 Aix-en-Provence	Team
Silver medal – second place	1987 Vienna	Team
Silver medal – second place	1988 Warmond	Team
Silver medal – second place	1989 Helsinki	Team
Irish Championships
Gold medal – first place	1987–93	singles

Rebecca Best (born 18 January 1964), married name Rebecca O'Callaghan, is an English-born former professional squash player. She reached a career-high world ranking of 6 in July 1988 and was a seven-time champion of Ireland.

== Biography ==
She was born in Sheffield, but represented Ireland. She won four consecutive silver medals with the Ireland women's national squash team at the European Squash Team Championships from 1986 to 1989.

Best won the first of her seven Irish national titles in 1987. After securing her fifth national crown in April 1992 she married and competed under her married name thereafter.

In December 1993, O'Callaghan won her seventh and last national title.
