= 1995 Women's British Open Squash Championship =

1995 women's sporting competition

British Open Squash Championships
- 67th Women's British Open Championships

Details
- Location: Cardiff, Wales
- Venue: Cardiff International Arena

The 1995 Leekes British Open Squash Championships was held at the Cardiff International Arena in Cardiff from 21–26 March 1995. The event was won by Michelle Martin for the third consecutive year defeating Liz Irving in a repeat of the 1994 final.

== Seeds ==
1. (Australia) Michelle Martin
2. (England) Suzanne Horner (née Burgess)
3. (England) Cassie Jackman
4. (Australia) Liz Irving
5. (Australia) Sarah Fitzgerald
6. (Australia) Carol Owens
7. (England) Fiona Geaves
8. (England) Sue Wright
9. (South Africa) Claire Nitch
10. (England) Jane Martin
11. (Germany) Sabine Schoene
12. (Australia) Vicki Cardwell (née Hoffman)
13. (England) Rebecca Macree
14. (Scotland) Senga Macfie
15. (New Zealand) Philippa Beams
16. (England) Linda Charman

== Draw and results ==
=== Qualifying round ===
Player One	Player Two	Score
(Wales) Sarah Taylor	(Spain) Izas Uriarte	9–0 9–3 8–10 9–2
(South Africa) Carla Venter	(Wales) Tegwen Malik	6–9 9–6 9–7 9–3
(New Zealand) Sarah Cook	(England) Tracey Shenton	6–9 9–6 9–6 9–3
(South Africa) Angelique Clifton Parks	(Egypt) Maha Zein	9–3 9–3 9–6
(New Zealand) Jade Wilson	(France) Corinne Castets	9–5 9–1 9–2
(England) Donna Vardy	(England) Samantha Langley	9–5 9–2 8–10 0–9 9–4
(England) Stephanie Brind	(Netherlands) Vanessa Atkinson	9–7 3–9 6–9 9–5 9–4
(England) Alison Wray	(England) Jenny Tranfield	2–9 7–9 9–3 9–4 10–9

=== First round ===
Player One	Player Two	Score
(Australia) Michelle Martin	(Australia) Meeghan Bell	9–0 9–0 9–6
(England) Suzanne Horner (née Burgess)	(Australia) Toni Weeks	10–8 9–1 9–0
(England) Cassie Jackman	(Netherlands) Hugoline Van Hoorn	6–9 9–6 9–0 9–1
(Australia) Liz Irving	(New Zealand) Sarah Cook	9–5 9–3 9–4
(Australia) Sarah Fitzgerald	(Wales) Sarah Taylor	9–1 9–2 9–2
(Australia) Carol Owens	(England) Alison Wray	9–7 10–8 9–2
(England) Fiona Geaves	(South Africa) Angelique Clifton Parks	9–6 9–5 9–4
(England) Sue Wright	(South Africa) Carla Venter	9–1 9–2 9–4
(South Africa) Claire Nitch	(New Zealand) Leilani Marsh	8–10 6–9 9–2 9–3 9–1
(England) Jane Martin	(Australia) Narelle Tippett	9–1 4–9 9–1 9–5
(Germany) Sabine Schoene	(England) Donia Leeves	9–5 9–0 9–1
(New Zealand) Jade Wilson	(Australia) Vicki Cardwell (née Hoffman)	5–9 9–0 9–5 9–0
(England) Stephanie Brind	(England) Rebecca Macree	10–9 9–7 9–7
(England) Donna Vardy	(Scotland) Senga Macfie	9–7 10–8 6–9 0–9 9–7
(New Zealand) Philippa Beams	(Netherlands) Denise Sommers	9–6 4–9 10–9 9–2
(England) Linda Charman	(Australia) Robyn Cooper	9–7 9–5 9–6

=== Second round ===
Player One	Player Two	Score
(Australia) Martin M	(England) Brind	9–0 9–0 9–0
(England) Geaves	(New Zealand) Wilson	9–3 9–0 9–0
(Australia) Fitzgerald	(Germany) Schoene	4–9 9–1 9–5 9–0
(England) Martin J	(England) Jackman	5–9 9–3 9–4 9–0
(Australia) Irving	(New Zealand) Beams	7–9 9–3 9–0 9–4
(England) Wright	(England) Vardy	9–1 9–0 9–0
(England) Horner	(South Africa) Nitch	9–7 9–1 9–1
(Australia) Owens	(England) Charman	9–7 9–6 9–4

=== Quarter-finals ===
Player One	Player Two	Score
(Australia) Martin M	(England) Geaves	9–4 4–9 9–5 9–2
(Australia) Fitzgerald	(England) Martin J	9–0 9–3 9–3
(England) Horner	(England) Wright	6–9 9–5 6–9 9–4
(Australia) Irving	(Australia) Owens	9–2 9–8 9–4

=== Semi-finals ===
Player One	Player Two	Score
(Australia) Martin	(Australia) Fitzgerald	3–9 9–2 3–9 9–3 9–2
(Australia) Irving	(England) Horner	9–6 9–3 3–9 9–3

=== Final ===
Player One	Player Two	Score
(Australia) Martin	(Australia) Irving	9–4 9–7 9–5

Preceded by 1994	British Open Squash Championships; Wales (Cardiff); 1995	Succeeded by 1996
