= 2000 Women's British Open Squash Championship =

British Open Squash Championships
- 72nd Women's British Open Championships

Details
- Location: Birmingham, England
- Venue: National Indoor Arena

The 2000 Women's British Open Squash Championships was held at the Edgbaston Priory Club (qualifying) and the National Indoor Arena in Birmingham from 9 to 15 October 2000. The event was won for the second consecutive year by Leilani Joyce who defeated Sue Wright in the final.

== Seeds ==
1. (England) Cassie Campion (née Jackman)
2. (New Zealand) Leilani Joyce (Marsh)
3. (Australia) Carol Owens
4. (England) Linda Charman
5. (England) Natalie Grainger
6. (England) Suzanne Horner (née Burgess)
7. (Germany) Sabine Schoene
8. (England) Tania Bailey
9. (England) Fiona Geaves
10. (Australia) Sarah Fitzgerald
11. (Australia) Rachael Grinham
12. (Netherlands) Vanessa Atkinson
13. (England) Stephanie Brind
14. (England) Rebecca Macree
15. (South Africa) Claire Nitch
16. (England) Jenny Tranfield

== Draw and results ==
=== Qualifying round ===
Player One	Player Two	Score
(England) Vicky Botwright	(Scotland) Lisa McKenna	9–0 9–4 9–2
(England) Cheryl Beaumont	(United States) Shabana Khan	9–0 9–1 3–9 10–8
(New Zealand) Shelley Kitchen	(Norway) Elin Blikra	9–5 9–6 6–9 9–3
(England) Sue Wright	(Republic of Ireland) Madeline Perry	9–6 9–2 9–2
(South Africa) Annelize Naudé	(Scotland) Wendy Maitland	9–6 9–4 9–2
(France) Isabelle Stoehr	(England) Kate Allison	9–1 9–2 10–8
(Egypt) Omneya Abdel Kawy	(Canada) Margo Green	10–9 9–2 8–10 10–8
(Switzerland) Agnes Muller	(Australia) Laura Keating	9–6 9–3 3–9 9–4

=== First round ===
Player One	Player Two	Score
(England) Cassie Campion (née Jackman)	(New Zealand) Shelley Kitchen	9–0 9–2 9–1
(New Zealand) Leilani Joyce (Marsh)	(Scotland) Senga Macfie	9–0 9–0 9–1
(Australia) Carol Owens	(Egypt) Salma Shabana	9–5 9–2 9–3
(England) Linda Charman	(Switzerland) Agnes Muller	9–5 9–7 3–0 ret
(England) Natalie Grainger	(United States) Latasha Khan	9–2 9–1 9–6
(England) Suzanne Horner (née Burgess)	(Australia) Natalie Grinham	9–4 6–9 9–4 9–4
(Scotland) Pamela Nimmo	(Germany) Sabine Schoene	5–9 9–3 9–4 9–6
(England) Tania Bailey	(Australia) Liz Irving	9–3 9–1 9–0
(England) Fiona Geaves	(South Africa) Annelize Naudé	10–8 4–9 3–9 10–8 9–1
(Australia) Sarah Fitzgerald	(Denmark) Ellen Petersen	9–0 9–2 9–0
(Australia) Rachael Grinham	(Egypt) Maha Zein	9–4 9–1 9–4
(Netherlands) Vanessa Atkinson	(England) Vicky Botwright	9–3 8–10 5–9 9–7 9–2
(England) Stephanie Brind	(France) Isabelle Stoehr	3–9 10–8 9–4 9–4
(England) Sue Wright	(England) Rebecca Macree	9–4 8–10 9–10 9–1 9–2
(England) Cheryl Beaumont	(South Africa) Claire Nitch	10–9 9–5 9–5
(Egypt) Omneya Abdel Kawy	(England) Jenny Tranfield	7–9 6–9 9–3 9–4 9–5

=== Second round ===
Player One	Player Two	Score
(New Zealand) Joyce	(England) Beaumont	9–0 9–3 9–0
(England) Horner	(England) Brind	9–2 9–2 6–9 9–3
(England) Charman	(Australia) Grinham R	9–1 5–9 9–7 4–9 9–3
(England) Geaves	(Scotland) Nimmo	9–5 9–4 9–2
(England) Wright	(England) Bailey	9–2 9–2 4–9 9–4
(Netherlands) Atkinson	(England) Campion	9–1 1–9 5–9 9–4 9–2
(Australia) Owens	(Egypt) Kawy	9–3 9–0 9–4
(Australia) Fitzgerald	(England) Grainger	9–4 9–4 9–4

=== Quarter-finals ===
Player One	Player Two	Score
(New Zealand) Joyce	(England) Horner	9–4 9–2 9–1
(England) Charman	(England) Geaves	9–3 9–3 9–3
(England) Wright	(Netherlands) Atkinson	0–9 9–3 7–9 9–3 9–5
(Australia) Owens	(Australia) Fitzgerald	9–5 9–5 9–3

=== Semi-finals ===
Player One	Player Two	Score
(New Zealand) Joyce	(England) Charman	10–8 9–0 9–4
(England) Wright	(Australia) Owens	10–9 9–5 3–9 9–5

=== Final ===
Player One	Player Two	Score
(New Zealand) Joyce	(England) Wright	9–7 9–4 9–2

Preceded by 1999	British Open Squash Championships; England (Birmingham); 2000	Succeeded by 2001
