= 1997 Women's British Open Squash Championship =

1997 women's sporting competition

British Open Squash Championships
- 69th Women's British Open Championships

Details
- Location: Cardiff, Wales
- Venue: Wales National Ice Rink

The 1997 Leekes British Open Squash Championships was held at the Welsh Institute of Sport with the later stages being held at the Wales National Ice Rink in Cardiff from 31 March- 6 April 1997. The event was won by Michelle Martin for the fifth consecutive year defeating Sarah Fitzgerald in a repeat of the 1996 final.

== Seeds ==
1. (Australia) Sarah Fitzgerald
2. (Australia) Michelle Martin
3. (England) Cassie Jackman – withdrew
4. (England) Sue Wright
5. (Australia) Liz Irving
6. (England) Suzanne Horner (née Burgess)
7. (Australia) Carol Owens
8. (Germany) Sabine Schoene
9. (South Africa) Claire Nitch
10. (England) Fiona Geaves
11. (England) Linda Charman
12. (England) Jane Martin
13. (England) Rebecca Macree
14. (Australia) Robyn Cooper
15. (Australia) Meeghan Bell
16. (New Zealand) Philippa Beams

== Draw and results ==
=== Qualifying round ===
| Player One | Player Two | Score |
|---|---|---|
| (Netherlands) Hugoline Van Hoorn | (Canada) Melanie Jans | 9–0 9–3 9–1 |
| (England) Tracey Shenton | (England) Janie Thacker | 9–5 9–5 6–9 9–6 |
| (South Africa) Natalie Grainger | (Egypt) Maha Zein | 9–4 9–1 9–0 |
| (England) Stephanie Brind | (Scotland) Senga Macfie | 9–4 7–9 9–3 9–4 |
| (Australia) Kate Major | (Wales) Tegwen Malik * | 3–9 9–3 9–1 9–5 |

Lucky Loser* due to the withdrawal of Cassie Jackman.

=== First round ===
| Player One | Player Two | Score |
|---|---|---|
| (Australia) Sarah Fitzgerald | (Egypt) Salma Shabana | 9–2 9–0 9–1 |
| (Australia) Michelle Martin | (New Zealand) Jade Wilson | 9–7 9–0 9–1 |
| (England) Sue Wright | (New Zealand) Leilani Joyce (Marsh) | 9–4 9–2 9–2 |
| (Australia) Liz Irving | (Australia) Toni Weeks | 4–9 9–2 9–4 9–5 |
| (England) Suzanne Horner (née Burgess) | (Australia) Narelle Tippett | 9–1 9–0 9–7 |
| (Australia) Carol Owens | (Australia) Vicki Cardwell (née Hoffman) | 9–0 9–7 9–6 |
| (Germany) Sabine Schoene | (Netherlands) Hugoline Van Hoorn | 9–5 2–9 9–6 9–3 |
| (South Africa) Claire Nitch | (England) Tracey Shenton | 9–4 9–6 9–0 |
| (England) Fiona Geaves | (Australia) Natarsha Tippett | 9–2 9–0 9–6 |
| (England) Linda Charman | (South Africa) Carla Venter | 9–0 9–1 9–1 |
| (England) Jane Martin | (England) Stephanie Brind | 9–2 7–9 9–3 9–7 |
| (England) Rebecca Macree | (Netherlands) Vanessa Atkinson | 9–5 9–0 9–2 |
| (Australia) Robyn Cooper | (New Zealand) Sarah Cook | 9–6 9–5 5–9 9–2 |
| (South Africa) Natalie Grainger | (Australia) Meeghan Bell | 9–5 9–7 10–8 |
| (New Zealand) Philippa Beams | (Australia) Kate Major | 9–10 9–1 9–1 9–3 |
| (Australia) Rachael Grinham | (Wales) Tegwen Malik | 9–7 9–2 9–10 3–9 9–3 |

=== Second round ===
| Player One | Player Two | Score |
|---|---|---|
| (Australia) Martin M | (Australia) Cooper | 9–3 9–7 9–5 |
| (Australia) Owens | (New Zealand) Beams | 9–2 9–4 9–1 |
| (England) Geaves | (Germany) Schoene | 9–6 10–8 4–9 9–4 |
| (England) Martin J | (Australia) Grinham | 9–6 9–2 9–2 |
| (Australia) Fitzgerald | (South Africa) Nitch | 9–4 9–2 9–1 |
| (Australia) Irving | (South Africa) Grainger | 9–4 7–9 9–3 9–4 |
| (England) Wright | (England) Macree | 7–9 3–9 9–4 9–6 9–4 |
| (England) Charman | (England) Horner | 9–3 9–3 8–10 5–9 9–1 |

=== Quarter-finals ===
| Player One | Player Two | Score |
|---|---|---|
| (Australia) Martin M | (Australia) Owens | 9–3 9–3 9–4 |
| (England) Geaves | (England) Martin J | 9–2 9–10 9–4 9–2 |
| (Australia) Fitzgerald | (Australia) Irving | 9–1 9–3 9–2 |
| (England) Wright | (England) Charman | 9–7 9–5 9–4 |

=== Semi-finals ===
| Player One | Player Two | Score |
|---|---|---|
| (Australia) Fitzgerald | (England) Wright | 9–2 7–9 9–2 9–1 |
| (Australia) Martin | (England) Geaves | 9–4 9–0 9–1 |

=== Final ===
| Player One | Player Two | Score |
|---|---|---|
| (Australia) Martin | (Australia) Fitzgerald | 9–5 9–10 9–5 9–5 |

| Preceded by 1996 | British Open Squash Championships; Wales (Cardiff); 1997 | Succeeded by 1998 |
