= 2001 Women's British Open Squash Championship =

British Open Squash Championships
- 73rd Women's British Open Championships

Details
- Location: Birmingham, England
- Venue: National Indoor Arena

The 2001 Women's Eye Group British Open Squash Championships was held at the Edgbaston Priory Club (qualifying) and the National Indoor Arena in Birmingham from 3–10 June 2001. The event was won by Sarah Fitzgerald who defeated Carol Owens in the final.

== Seeds ==
1. (New Zealand) Leilani Joyce (Marsh)
2. (Australia) Carol Owens
3. (Australia) Sarah Fitzgerald
4. (England) Linda Charman-Smith
5. (England) Natalie Grainger
6. (England) Tania Bailey
7. (England) Suzanne Horner (née Burgess)
8. (Australia) Rachael Grinham
9. (England) Stephanie Brind
10. (England) Fiona Geaves
11. (Netherlands) Vanessa Atkinson
12. (England) Cassie Campion (née Jackman)
13. (England) Rebecca Macree
14. (England) Jenny Tranfield
15. (Scotland) Pamela Nimmo
16. (England) Vicky Botwright

== Draw and results ==
=== Qualifying round ===
Player One	Player Two	Score
(England) Vicky Lankester	(United States) Shabana Khan	9–2 9–4 10–8
(Canada) Melanie Jans	(Scotland) Lisa McKenna	5–9 9–6 9–2 9–3
(Australia) Liz Irving	(Pakistan) Carla Khan	9–7 9–4 9–0
(Scotland) Wendy Maitland	(Denmark) Mette Jørgensen	9–3 9–1 9–5
(Malaysia) Nicol David	(England) Lauren Briggs	9–2 10–8 9–1
(England) Cheryl Beaumont	(England) Dominique Lloyd-Walter	9–10 4–9 9–3 9–7 9–6
(Republic of Ireland) Madeline Perry	(England) Kate Allison	9–1 6–9 9–1 9–3
(England) Helen Easton	(England) Laura Lengthorn	9–5 5–9 8–10 9–1 9–4

=== First round ===
Player One	Player Two	Score
(New Zealand) Leilani Joyce (Marsh)	(Scotland) Wendy Maitland	9–2 9–0 9–0
(Australia) Carol Owens	(Scotland) Senga Macfie	9–2 9–5 9–2
(Australia) Sarah Fitzgerald	(England) Janie Thacker	9–4 9–6 9–2
(England) Linda Charman-Smith	(England) Vicky Lankester	9–2 9–0 9–3
(England) Natalie Grainger	(Egypt) Salma Shabana	6–9 9–2 9–6 9–3
(England) Tania Bailey	(South Africa) Annelize Naudé	2–9 9–3 9–0 9–1
(Australia) Natalie Grinham	(England) Suzanne Horner (née Burgess)	9–4 7–9 9–3 9–1
(Australia) Rachael Grinham	(United States) Latasha Khan	9–3 9–7 9–6
(England) Stephanie Brind	(England) Cheryl Beaumont	9–6 9–4 9–1
(England) Fiona Geaves	(Canada) Melanie Jans	9–2 10–9 9–4
(Australia) Liz Irving	(Netherlands) Vanessa Atkinson	9–4 9–2 2–9 9–6
(England) Cassie Campion (née Jackman)	(Egypt) Maha Zein	9–5 10–8 9–7
(England) Rebecca Macree	(Malaysia) Nicol David	9–7 7–9 9–1 9–6
(England) Jenny Tranfield	(Denmark) Ellen Petersen	9–5 9–7 9–0
(Scotland) Pamela Nimmo	(England) Helen Easton	9–2 9–3 9–6
(England) Vicky Botwright	(Republic of Ireland) Madeline Perry	9–2 8–10 9–4 10–9

=== Second round ===
Player One	Player Two	Score
(Australia) Fitzgerald	(Australia) Irving	9–5 9–4 9–2
(England) Campion	(Australia) Grinham N	9–0 8–10 9–2 2–9 9–7
(New Zealand) Joyce	(England) Tranfield	9–1 9–3 9–1
(England) Brind	(England) Bailey	4–9 9–3 6–9 10–8 9–3
(Australia) Owens	(England) Geaves	9–4 9–0 5–9 9–1
(England) Macree	(Australia) Grinham R	9–5 9–4 4–9 6–9 9–7
(England) Charman-Smith	(Scotland) Nimmo	9–3 9–1 9–1
(England) Grainger	(England) Botwright	10–8 9–6 9–4

=== Quarter-finals ===
Player One	Player Two	Score
(Australia) Fitzgerald	(England) Campion	9–6 9–10 9–7 9–2
(New Zealand) Joyce	(England) Brind	9–0 9–6 9–0
(Australia) Owens	(England) Macree	9–7 9–5 9–0
(England) Charman-Smith	(England) Grainger	9–4 2–9 10–8 9–6

=== Semi-finals ===
Player One	Player Two	Score
(Australia) Fitzgerald	(New Zealand) Joyce	8–10 3–9 9–2 9–6 9–7
(Australia) Owens	(England) Charman-Smith	9–6 2–9 8–10 9–2 9–1

=== Final ===
Player One	Player Two	Score
(Australia) Fitzgerald	(Australia) Owens	10–9 9–0 9–2

Preceded by 2000	British Open Squash Championships; England (Birmingham); 2001	Succeeded by 2002
