= 2002 Women's British Open Squash Championship =

British Open Squash Championships
- 74th Women's British Open Championships

Details
- Location: London & Manchester, England
- Venue: Lambs SC & National Squash Centre

The 2002 Women's British Open Squash Championships was held at the Lambs Squash Club, London (qualifying) and the National Squash Centre in Manchester from 8–15 April 2002. The event was won by Sarah Fitzgerald who defeated Tania Bailey in the final.

== Seeds ==
1. (Australia) Sarah Fitzgerald
2. (Australia) Carol Owens
3. (England) Cassie Campion (née Jackman)
4. (England) Fiona Geaves
5. (England) Linda Charman-Smith
6. (England) Stephanie Brind
7. (Australia) Rachael Grinham
8. (England) Suzanne Horner (née Burgess)
9. (Netherlands) Vanessa Atkinson
10. (England) Natalie Pohrer (née Grainger)
11. (England) Rebecca Macree
12. (Australia) Natalie Grinham
13. (New Zealand) Shelley Kitchen
14. (England) Vicky Botwright
15. (England) Tania Bailey
16. (Malaysia) Nicol David

== Draw and results ==
=== Qualifying round ===
Player One	Player Two	Score
(South Africa) Farrah Sterne	(England) Caroline Heal	4–9 9–0 9–6 9–0
(Scotland) Wendy Maitland	(Pakistan) Carla Khan	6–9 9–5 9–7 9–3
(England) Jenny Duncalf	(New Zealand) Lara Petara	10–8 9–1 10–9
(Egypt) Engy Kheirallah	(Norway) Elin Blikra	9–2 9–4 9–1
(New Zealand) Louise Crome	(England) Cheryl Beaumont	9–6 9–3 9–2
(Malaysia) Sharon Wee	(Belgium) Kim Hannes	7–9 2–9 10–9 9–4 9–0
(England) Kate Allison	(England) Dominique Lloyd-Walter	3–9 9–7 9–4 9–4
(England) Laura Lengthorn	(England) Becky Botwright	4–9 9–2 5–9 9–5 9–1

=== First round ===
Player One	Player Two	Score
(Australia) Sarah Fitzgerald	(Scotland) Wendy Maitland	9–1 9–2 9–0
(New Zealand) Carol Owens	(Republic of Ireland) Madeline Perry	9–1 9–1 9–0
(England) Cassie Campion (née Jackman)	(Egypt) Engy Kheirallah	9–0 9–0 9–1
(England) Fiona Geaves	(Hong Kong) Rebecca Chiu	9–5 9–0 9–5
(England) Linda Charman-Smith	(England) Jenny Duncalf	9–2 9–0 9–0
(Malaysia) Sharon Wee	(England) Stephanie Brind	w/o
(Australia) Rachael Grinham	(England) Kate Allison	9–3 9–2 9–4
(Netherlands) Vanessa Atkinson	(Australia) Liz Irving	9–1 9–0 9–4
(England) Natalie Pohrer (née Grainger)	(Denmark) Ellen Petersen	9–1 9–0 9–1
(England) Rebecca Macree	(Egypt) Omneya Abdel Kawy	9–7 6–9 9–2 9–7
(Australia) Natalie Grinham	(South Africa) Farrah Sterne	7–9 2–9 9–1 9–1 9–4
(New Zealand) Shelley Kitchen	(Egypt) Maha Zein	9–3 9–5 9–4
(England) Vicky Botwright	(England) Laura Lengthorn	9–0 9–5 9–2
(England) Tania Bailey	(Scotland) Senga Macfie	9–4 9–6 9–6
(Malaysia) Nicol David	(Scotland) Pamela Nimmo	9–7 9–5 9–4
(England) Jenny Tranfield	(New Zealand) Louise Crome	9–7 9–7 9–3

(England) Suzanne Horner (née Burgess) withdrew.

=== Second round ===
Player One	Player Two	Score
(Australia) Fitzgerald	(England) Macree	9–3 9–0 9–2
(England) Tranfield	(Malaysia) Wee	9–0 9–4 5–9 9–2
(Netherlands) Atkinson	(England) Pohrer	9–6 2–9 9–3 4–9 9–5
(England) Geaves	(New Zealand) Kitchen	9–0 9–6 9–4
(England) Campion	(England) Botwright	9–2 9–7 10–8
(Australia) Grinham R	(Australia) Grinham N	9–7 9–2 10–8
(England) Bailey	(England) Charman-Smith	6–9 8–10 9–3 3–0 ret
(New Zealand) Owens	(Malaysia) David	9–4 9–0 9–10 9–1

=== Quarter-finals ===
Player One	Player Two	Score
(Australia) Fitzgerald	(England) Tranfield	9–5 9–1 9–1
(Netherlands) Atkinson	(England) Geaves	9–2 4–9 3–9 9–7 1–9
(England) Campion	(Australia) Grinham R	9–4 10–8 9–4
(England) Bailey	(New Zealand) Owens	2–9 7–9 2–9

=== Semi-finals ===
Player One	Player Two	Score
(Australia) Fitzgerald	(Netherlands) Atkinson	9–2 9–4 9–5
(England) Campion	(England) Bailey	2–9 9–3 4–9 9–3 7–9

=== Final ===
Player One	Player Two	Score
(Australia) Fitzgerald	(England) Bailey	9–3 9–0 9–0

Preceded by 2001	British Open Squash Championships; England (London & Manchester); 2002	Succeeded by 2003
