= 2005 Women's British Open Squash Championship =

British Open Squash Championships
- 77th Women's British Open Championships

Details
- Location: Manchester, England
- Venue: National Squash Centre

The 2005 Women's Dunlop British Open Squash Championships was held at the National Squash Centre in Manchester from 9–17 October 2005. The event was won by Nicol David who defeated Natalie Grinham in the final.

== Seeds ==
1. (Australia) Rachael Grinham
2. (Netherlands) Vanessa Atkinson
3. (Malaysia) Nicol David
4. (Australia) Natalie Grinham
5. (United States) Natalie Grainger
6. (England) Vicky Botwright
7. (England) Jenny Duncalf
8. (England) Tania Bailey
9. (England) Jenny Tranfield
10. (Republic of Ireland) Madeline Perry
11. (New Zealand) Shelley Kitchen
12. (Netherlands) Annelize Naudé
13. (France) Isabelle Stoehr
14. (Hong Kong) Rebecca Chiu
15. (England) Alison Waters
16. (Scotland) Pamela Nimmo

== Draw and results ==
=== First qualifying round ===
Player One	Player Two	Score
(France) Isabelle Stoehr	(France) Charlotte Delsinne	9–1 9–3 9–0
(England) Alison Waters	(England) Fiona Moverley	9–0 9–1 9–1
(Scotland) Pamela Nimmo	(England) Laura Hill	9–3 9–5 9–2
(Republic of Ireland) Aisling Blake	(England) Lauren Siddall	9–2 9–6 9–4
(England) Dominique Lloyd-Walter	(Germany) Daniela Schumann	9–3 9–3 9–5
(England) Laura Lengthorn	(France) Célia Allamargot	9–2 9–1 9–0
(Wales) Tegwen Malik	(England) Carrie Hastings	9–0 9–2 9–0
(Netherlands) Orla Noom	(England) Jenna Gates	9–0 10–9 10–9
(Guyana) Nicolette Fernandes	(France) Laurence Bois	9–6 9–0 9–2
(Australia) Amanda Hopps	(England) Stephanie Brind	9–1 10–9 9–7
(Netherlands) Karen Kronemeyer	(England) Susannah King	9–2 9–0 9–2
(England) Lauren Briggs	(France) Camille Serme	9–6 9–0 9–0
(England) Sarah Kippax	(Netherlands) Dagmar Vermeulen	9–1 9–0 9–5
(England) Becky Botwright	(France) Soraya Renai	9–1 9–2 9–5
(Pakistan) Carla Khan	(France) Maud Duplomb	9–3 9–4 9–0
(England) Suzie Pierrepont	(England) Kirsty McPhee	9–3 9–3 9–3

(Hong Kong) Rebecca Chiu withdrew.

=== Second qualifying round ===
Player One	Player Two	Score
(France) Stoehr	(Republic of Ireland) Blake	9–6 9–1 9–0
(England) Waters	(England) Pierrepont	9–10 9–5 9–2 9–4
(Scotland) Nimmo	(Guyana) Fernandes	9–5 9–0 9–4
(England) Lloyd-Walter	(England) Briggs	9–4 9–2 9–4
(England) Lengthorn	(England) Kippax	9–5 9–4 10–8
(Wales) Malik	(Netherlands) Noom	9–1 9–0 9–4
(England) Botwright B	(Pakistan) Khan	9–4 4–9 9–3 10–9
(Netherlands) Kronemeyer	(Australia) Hopps	9–4 9–10 9–5 2–9 9–3

=== Final qualifying round ===
Player One	Player Two	Score
(England) Waters	(England) Botwright B	9–4 9–1 9–4
(Scotland) Nimmo	(Netherlands) Kronemeyer *	9–5 9–3 6–9 9–0
(England) Lengthorn	(England) Lloyd-Walter	9–2 9–5 9–2
(Wales) Malik	(France) Stoehr	9–7 2–9 6–9 9–6 9–2

Lucky loser*

=== First round ===
Player One	Player Two	Score
(Australia) Rachael Grinham	(Scotland) Pamela Nimmo	9–2 9–5 9–2
(Netherlands) Vanessa Atkinson	(England) Alison Waters	7–9 2–9 3–9
(Malaysia) Nicol David	(New Zealand) Shelley Kitchen	9–5 9–1 9–4
(Australia) Natalie Grinham	(Netherlands) Karen Kronemeyer	w/o
(United States) Natalie Grainger	(England) Laura Lengthorn	9–10 4–9 1–9
(England) Vicky Botwright	(Republic of Ireland) Madeline Perry	7–9 9–3 9–4 7–9 9–6
(England) Jenny Duncalf	(Netherlands) Annelize Naudé	9–3 10–9 9–7
(England) Tania Bailey	(Wales) Tegwen Malik	9–3 9–4 9–1

(England) Jenny Tranfield withdrew.

=== Quarter-finals ===
Player One	Player Two	Score
(Australia) Grinham R	(England) Duncalf	5–9 9–4 9–6 9–1
(Malaysia) David	(England) Botwright	8–10 7–9 9–1 9–1 9–2
(Australia) Grinham N	(England) Lengthorn	10–9 9–4 9–1
(England) Bailey	(England) Waters	9–3 9–4 12–10

=== Semi-finals ===
Player One	Player Two	Score
(Australia) Grinham R	(Malaysia) David	9–3 7–9 9–7 4–9 1–9
(Australia) Grinham N	(England) Bailey	10–8 9–2 9–1

=== Final ===
Player One	Player Two	Score
(Malaysia) David	(Australia) Grinham N	9–6 9–7 9–6

Preceded by 2004	British Open Squash Championships; England (Manchester); 2005	Succeeded by 2006
