= 1996 Women's British Open Squash Championship =

1996 women's sporting competition

British Open Squash Championships
- 68th Women's British Open Championships

Details
- Location: Cardiff, Wales
- Venue: Cardiff International Arena

The 1996 Leekes British Open Squash Championships was held at the Welsh Institute of Sport with the later stages being held at the Cardiff International Arena in Cardiff from 1–7 April 1996. The event was won by Michelle Martin for the fourth consecutive year defeating Sarah Fitzgerald in the final.

== Seeds ==
1. (Australia) Michelle Martin
2. (Australia) Sarah Fitzgerald
3. (Australia) Liz Irving
4. (England) Cassie Jackman
5. (Australia) Carol Owens
6. (England) Suzanne Horner (née Burgess)
7. (Germany) Sabine Schoene
8. (England) Fiona Geaves
9. (England) Sue Wright
10. (England) Jane Martin
11. (South Africa) Claire Nitch
12. (New Zealand) Philippa Beams
13. (England) Rebecca Macree
14. (Australia) Vicki Cardwell (née Hoffman)
15. (England) Leilani Marsh

== Draw and results ==
=== Qualifying round ===
| Player One | Player Two | Score |
|---|---|---|
| (England) Alison Wray | (New Zealand) Sarah Cook | 5–9 9–4 6–9 9–5 9–3 |
| (England) Tracey Shenton | (England) Claire Fleetwood | 9–0 9–5 10–8 |
| (South Africa) Angelique Clifton-Parks | (Netherlands) Hugoline Van Hoorn | 5–9 9–6 9–6 9–2 |
| (England) Janie Thacker | (Egypt) Salma Shabana | 10–8 9–7 9–1 |
| (Germany) Sabine Baum | (Australia) Danielle Drady | 9–4 10–9 1–9 10–8 |
| (Australia) Rachael Grinham | (England) Stephanie Brind | 9–2 9–5 5–9 9–6 |
| (England) Donna Vardy | (France) Corinne Castets | 7–9 9–6 9–3 9–6 |
| (England) Janine Hickey | (England) Pauline Nicholl | 4–9 3–9 9–6 7–6 ret |

=== First round ===
| Player One | Player Two | Score |
|---|---|---|
| (Australia) Michelle Martin | (South Africa) Angelique Clifton Parks | 9–1 9–0 9–2 |
| (Australia) Sarah Fitzgerald | (Australia) Natarsha Tippett | 9–0 9–2 9–0 |
| (Australia) Liz Irving | (Germany) Sabine Baum | 9–0 9–5 9–0 |
| (England) Cassie Jackman | (England) Linda Charman | 9–4 9–0 9–5 |
| (Australia) Carol Owens | (Australia) Janine Hickey | 9–1 0–8 9–5 |
| (England) Suzanne Horner | (England) Alison Wray | 4–9 9–0 9–0 9–0 |
| (Germany) Sabine Schoene | (Australia) Toni Weeks | 9–4 9–4 9–3 |
| (England) Fiona Geaves | (England) Janie Thacker | 9–5 9–1 9–6 |
| (England) Sue Wright | (England) Donna Vardy | 9–1 9–3 9–1 |
| (England) Jane Martin | (Canada) Heather Wallace | 9–2 9–2 9–2 |
| (South Africa) Claire Nitch | (Scotland) Senga Macfie | 9–3 9–6 9–0 |
| (New Zealand) Philippa Beams | (England) Tracey Shenton | 9–1 9–2 9–5 |
| (Australia) Robyn Cooper | (Australia) Rachael Grinham | 9–3 9–2 9–7 |
| (England) Rebecca Macree | (England) Donia Leeves | 9–6 9–4 9–5 |
| (Australia) Vicki Cardwell (née Hoffman) | (Australia) Meeghan Bell | 9–7 9–2 10–8 |
| (New Zealand) Leilani Marsh | (New Zealand) Jade Wilson | 9–3 9–2 9–5 |

=== Second round ===
| Player One | Player Two | Score |
|---|---|---|
| (Australia) Martin M | (Australia) Cooper | 9–1 9–3 9–3 |
| (England) Horner | (South Africa) Nitch | 9–4 9–2 0–9 9–7 |
| (England) Martin J | (Germany) Schoene | 9–5 9–2 7–9 9–6 |
| (Australia) Irving | (New Zealand) Beams | 9–2 9–2 9–0 |
| (Australia) Fitzgerald | (England) Wright | 3–9 9–7 9–5 10–9 |
| (Australia) Owens | (New Zealand) Marsh | 9–4 9–2 9–2 |
| (England) Geaves | (England) Macree | 9–5 9–0 9–0 |
| (England) Jackman | (Australia) Cardwell | 9–1 9–5 9–6 |

=== Quarter-finals ===
| Player One | Player Two | Score |
|---|---|---|
| (Australia) Martin M | (England) Horner | 9–6 9–1 9–3 |
| (England) Martin J | (Australia) Irving | 9–2 6–9 5–9 9–7 9–2 |
| (Australia) Fitzgerald | (Australia) Owens | 9–2 9–3 9–1 |
| (England) Geaves | (England) Jackman | 4–9 9–3 6–9 9–6 9–4 |

=== Semi-finals ===
| Player One | Player Two | Score |
|---|---|---|
| (Australia) Martin M | (England) Martin J | 9–4 9–7 9–4 |
| (Australia) Fitzgerald | (England) Geaves | 9–7 9–2 9–1 |

=== Final ===
| Player One | Player Two | Score |
|---|---|---|
| (Australia) Martin | (Australia) Fitzgerald | 9–4 9–7 9–5 |

| Preceded by 1995 | British Open Squash Championships; Wales (Cardiff); 1996 | Succeeded by 1997 |
