= 1999 Women's British Open Squash Championship =

British Open Squash Championships
- 71st Women's British Open Championships

Details
- Location: Aberdeen, Scotland
- Venue: Aberdeen Exhibition and Conference Centre

The 1999 Women's British Open Squash Championships was held at the Aberdeen Exhibition and Conference Centre in Aberdeen from 6–12 December 1999. The event was won by Leilani Joyce who defeated Cassie Campion (née Jackman) in the final.

== Seeds ==
1. (England) Cassie Campion (née Jackman)
2. (New Zealand) Leilani Joyce (Marsh)
3. (Australia) Carol Owens
4. (England) Linda Charman
5. (England) Natalie Grainger
6. (England) Suzanne Horner (née Burgess)
7. (England) Fiona Geaves
8. (England) Stephanie Brind

== Draw and results ==
=== First round ===
Player One	Player Two	Score
(England) Cassie Campion (née Jackman)	(Australia) Liz Irving	9-1 9-7 9–3
(New Zealand) Leilani Joyce (Marsh)	(Australia) Natalie Grinham	9-7 9-2 9–2
(Australia) Carol Owens	(Scotland) Wendy Maitland	9-1 9-2 9–7
(England) Linda Charman	(Wales) Tegwen Malik	9-2 9-2 9–1
(England) Natalie Grainger	(Scotland) Senga Macfie	9-4 9-3 9–6
(England) Suzanne Horner (née Burgess)	(United States) Shabana Khan	9-1 9-1 9–0
(England) Fiona Geaves	(England) Vicky Botwright	9-1 9-7 9–3
(England) Stephanie Brind	(New Zealand) Shelley Kitchen	9-6 9-3 9–2
(Australia) Rachael Grinham	(Wales) Karen Hargreaves	9-2 9-0 9–2
(England) Sue Wright	(Denmark) Ellen Petersen	9-1 9-5 9–4
(Netherlands) Vanessa Atkinson	(Egypt) Maha Zein	9-5 7-9 0-9 9-3 9–5
(Australia) Sarah Fitzgerald	(Scotland) Pamela Nimmo	9-0 10-9 9–6
(England) Tania Bailey	(England) Janie Thacker	10-8 6-9 9-4 9–7
(England) Rebecca Macree	(Egypt) Salma Shabana	9-7 10-8 8-10 9–0
(England) Jenny Tranfield	(Canada) Melanie Jans	9-1 9-3 9–6
(South Africa) Claire Nitch	(United States) Latasha Khan	9-5 9-3 6-9 9–6

=== Second round ===
Player One	Player Two	Score
(England) Campion	(Australia) Grinham R	9-3 9-0 9–4
(New Zealand) Joyce	(England) Wright	9-6 9-4 9–4
(Australia) Owens	(Netherlands) Atkinson	9-1 9-0 9–0
(England) Charman	(Australia) Fitzgerald	5-9 6-9 9-7 9-1 9–5
(England) Grainger	(England) Bailey	9-5 9-7 9–4
(England) Horner	(England) Macree	9-4 9-2 9–5
(England) Geaves	(England) Tranfield	9-4 9-5 6-9 9–3
(England) Brind	(South Africa) Nitch	9-7 9-3 9–0

=== Quarter finals ===
Player One	Player Two	Score
(England) Campion	(England) Geaves	9-1 9-6 3-9 9–1
(New Zealand) Joyce	(England) Brind	9-4 9-6 9–3
(Australia) Owens	(England) Grainger	2-9 8-10 9-0 9-5 7–9
(England) Charman	(England) Horner	9-7 9-1 9–1

=== Semi finals ===
Player One	Player Two	Score
(England) Campion	(England) Charman	9-4 9-0 9–1
(New Zealand) Joyce	(England) Grainger	9-4 9-3 9–4

=== Final ===
Player One	Player Two	Score
(New Zealand) Joyce	(England) Campion	5-9 9-6 9-3 10–8

Preceded by 1998	British Open Squash Championships; Scotland (Aberdeen); 1999	Succeeded by 2000
