= 1994 Women's British Open Squash Championship =

British Open Squash Championships
- 66th Women's British Open Championships

Details
- Location: London, England
- Venue: Lambs Squash Club & Wembley Conference Centre

The 1994 Hi-Tec British Open Squash Championships was held at the Lambs Squash Club with the later stages being held at the Wembley Conference Centre in London from 4–11 April 1994. The event was won by Michelle Martin for the second consecutive year defeating Liz Irving in the final.

== Seeds ==
1. (Australia) Michelle Martin
2. (Australia) Liz Irving
3. (England) Suzanne Horner (née Burgess)
4. (Australia) Sarah Fitzgerald
5. (England) Cassie Jackman
6. (England) Sue Wright
7. (Australia) Carol Owens
8. (Canada) Heather Wallace
9. (Guernsey) Martine Le Moignan
10. (South Africa) Claire Nitch
11. (England) Jane Martin

== Draw and results ==
=== Qualifying round ===
Player One	Player Two	Score
(New Zealand) Jade Wilson	(Republic of Ireland) Aisling McArdle	9–5 9–1 9–3
(Netherlands) Denise Sommers	(New Zealand) Sarah Cook	9–2 9–3 6–9 4–9 9–6
(South Africa) Natalie Grainger	(Australia) Janine Hickey	9–2 5–9 9–4 9–7
(England) Pauline Nicholl	(England) Mandy Preuss	9–3 9–3 9–7
(France) Corinne Castets	(Australia) Kym Keevil	9–4 6–9 3–9 9–7 9–4
(New Zealand) Philippa Beams	(South Africa) Chantel Clifton Parks	6–9 9–4 9–7 9–7
(South Africa) Sianne Cawdry	(United States) Ellie Pierce	7–9 9–2 9–3 9–0
(South Africa) Angelique Clifton Parks	(England) Samantha Langley	9–3 9–4 9–1

=== First round ===
Player One	Player Two	Score
(Australia) Michelle Martin	(South Africa) Angelique Clifton Parks	9–4 9–1 9–0
(Australia) Liz Irving	(Australia) Toni Weeks	9–3 9–5 9–2
(England) Suzanne Horner (née Burgess)	(New Zealand) Philippa Beams	9–2 9–5 9–0
(Australia) Sarah Fitzgerald	(New Zealand) Leilani Marsh	9–1 9–5 9–6
(England) Cassie Jackman	(Republic of Ireland) Rebecca O'Callaghan (née Best)	4–9 4–9 9–7 9–4 9–0
(England) Sue Wright	(Scotland) Senga Macfie	9–7 6–9 9–5 9–7
(Australia) Carol Owens	(Netherlands) Denise Sommers	9–2 9–2 9–4
(Canada) Heather Wallace	(England) Linda Charman	9–4 9–7 3–9 9–6
(Guernsey) Martine Le Moignan	(New Zealand) Jade Wilson	9–3 9–4 9–4
(South Africa) Claire Nitch	(England) Pauline Nicholl	9–6 9–6 9–6
(England) Jane Martin	(Netherlands) Hugoline Van Hoorn	10–8 9–6 9–1
(Guernsey) Lisa Opie	(Australia) Sharon Bradey	9–1 9–7 9–6
(England) Rebecca Macree	(Australia) Robyn Cooper	5–9 9–6 8–10 9–0 10–8
(Australia) Vicki Cardwell (née Hoffman)	(France) Corinne Castets	9–3 9–0 9–0
(Germany) Sabine Schoene	(South Africa) Natalie Grainger	2–9 5–9 9–3 9–2 9–0
(England) Fiona Geaves	(South Africa) Sianne Cawdry	9–5 9–1 9–1

=== Second round ===
Player One	Player Two	Score
(Australia) Martin M	(Australia) Cardwell	9–5 9–0 9–2
(Guernsey) Le Moignan	(England) Jackman	8–10 9–3 9–4 1–9 9–7
(Australia) Fitzgerald	(Germany) Schoene	9–5 9–7 9–0
(South Africa) Nitch	(Canada) Wallace	0–9 1–9 9–3 9–6 9–5
(Australia) Irving	(Guernsey) Opie	9–6 9–6 9–5
(Australia) Owens	(England) Macree	9–2 2–9 9–0 9–1
(England) Horner	(England) Martin J	9–3 9–4 9–6
(England) Geaves	(England) Wright	9–3 9–0 9–7

=== Quarter-finals ===
Player One	Player Two	Score
(Australia) Martin	(Guernsey) Le Moignan	9–2 9–3 9–2
(Australia) Fitzgerald	(South Africa) Nitch	9–3 3–9 9–2 10–8
(Australia) Irving	(Australia) Owens	9–4 9–1 8–10 9–4
(England) Horner	(England) Geaves	9–2 9–2 9–3

=== Semi-finals ===
Player One	Player Two	Score
(Australia) Martin	(Australia) Fitzgerald	9–6 9–6 9–5
(Australia) Irving	(England) Horner	7–9 9–7 9–2 9–1

=== Final ===
Player One	Player Two	Score
(Australia) Martin	(Australia) Irving	9–1 9–5 9–3

Preceded by 1993	British Open Squash Championships; England (London); 1994	Succeeded by 1995
