= List of Commonwealth Games medallists in squash =

This is the complete list of Commonwealth Games medallists in squash from 1998 to 2018.

== Men's singles ==
Games	Gold	Silver	Bronze
1998	Peter Nicol (SCO)	Jonathon Power (CAN)	Alex Gough (WAL)
1998	Peter Nicol (SCO)	Jonathon Power (CAN)	Paul Johnson (ENG)
2002	Jonathon Power (CAN)	Peter Nicol (ENG)	Stewart Boswell (AUS)
2002	Jonathon Power (CAN)	Peter Nicol (ENG)	David Palmer (AUS)
2006	Peter Nicol (ENG)	David Palmer (AUS)	Lee Beachill (ENG)
2010	Nick Matthew (ENG)	James Willstrop (ENG)	Peter Barker (ENG)
2014	Nick Matthew (ENG)	James Willstrop (ENG)	Peter Barker (ENG)
2018	James Willstrop (ENG)	Paul Coll (NZL)	Mohd Nafiizwan Adnan (MAS)

== Women's singles ==
Games	Gold	Silver	Bronze
1998	Michelle Martin (AUS)	Sarah Fitz-Gerald (AUS)	Cassie Jackman (ENG)
1998	Michelle Martin (AUS)	Sarah Fitz-Gerald (AUS)	Sue Wright (ENG)
2002	Sarah Fitz-Gerald (AUS)	Carol Owens (NZL)	Rachael Grinham (AUS)
2002	Sarah Fitz-Gerald (AUS)	Carol Owens (NZL)	Cassie Jackman (ENG)
2006	Natalie Grinham (AUS)	Rachael Grinham (AUS)	Shelley Kitchen (NZL)
2010	Nicol David (MAS)	Jenny Duncalf (ENG)	Kasey Brown (AUS)
2014	Nicol David (MAS)	Laura Massaro (ENG)	Joelle King (NZL)
2018	Joelle King (NZL)	Sarah-Jane Perry (ENG)	Tesni Evans (WAL)

== Men's doubles ==
Games	Gold	Silver	Bronze
1998	Mark Chaloner & Paul Johnson (ENG)	Byron Davis & Rodney Eyles (AUS)	Mark Cairns & Chris Walker (ENG)
1998	Mark Chaloner & Paul Johnson (ENG)	Byron Davis & Rodney Eyles (AUS)	Stuart Cowie & Peter Nicol (SCO)
2002	Lee Beachill & Peter Nicol (ENG)	Stewart Boswell & Anthony Ricketts (AUS)	David Palmer & Paul Price (AUS)
2002	Lee Beachill & Peter Nicol (ENG)	Stewart Boswell & Anthony Ricketts (AUS)	Mark Chaloner & Paul Johnson (ENG)
2006	Peter Nicol & Lee Beachill (ENG)	Stewart Boswell & Anthony Ricketts (AUS)	Dan Jenson & David Palmer (AUS)
2010	Nick Matthew & Adrian Grant (ENG)	Stewart Boswell & David Palmer (AUS)	Ryan Cuskelly & Cameron Pilley (AUS)
2014	Cameron Pilley & David Palmer (AUS)	Nick Matthew & Adrian Grant (ENG)	James Willstrop & Daryl Selby (ENG)
2018	Zac Alexander & David Palmer (AUS)	Daryl Selby & Adrian Waller (ENG)	Declan James & James Willstrop (ENG)

== Women's doubles ==
Games	Gold	Silver	Bronze
1998	Cassie Jackman & Sue Wright (ENG)	Robyn Cooper & Rachael Grinham (AUS)	Sarah Fitz-Gerald & Carol Owens (AUS)
1998	Cassie Jackman & Sue Wright (ENG)	Robyn Cooper & Rachael Grinham (AUS)	Natalie Grainger & Claire Nitch (RSA)
2002	Carol Owens & Leilani Rorani (NZL)	Tania Bailey & Cassie Jackman (ENG)	Natalie Grinham & Rachael Grinham (AUS)
2002	Carol Owens & Leilani Rorani (NZL)	Tania Bailey & Cassie Jackman (ENG)	Linda Charman & Fiona Geaves (ENG)
2006	Natalie Grinham & Rachael Grinham (AUS)	Shelley Kitchen & Tamsyn Leevey (NZL)	Tania Bailey & Vicky Botwright (ENG)
2010	Jaclyn Hawkes & Joelle King (NZL)	Jenny Duncalf & Laura Massaro (ENG)	Kasey Brown & Donna Urquhart (AUS)
2014	Dipika Pallikal Karthik & Joshna Chinappa (IND)	Laura Massaro & Jenny Duncalf (ENG)	Alison Waters & Emma Beddoes (ENG)
2018	Joelle King & Amanda Landers-Murphy (NZL)	Joshna Chinappa & Dipika Pallikal Karthik (IND)	Rachael Grinham & Donna Urquhart (AUS)

== Mixed doubles ==
Games	Gold	Silver	Bronze
1998	Craig Rowland & Michelle Martin (AUS)	Simon Parke & Suzanne Horner (ENG)	Glen Wilson & Sarah Cook (NZL)
1998	Craig Rowland & Michelle Martin (AUS)	Simon Parke & Suzanne Horner (ENG)	Rodney Durbach & Natalie Grainger (RSA)
2002	Glen Wilson & Leilani Rorani (NZL)	Ong Beng Hee & Nicol David (MAS)	Joseph Kneipp & Robyn Cooper (AUS)
2002	Glen Wilson & Leilani Rorani (NZL)	Ong Beng Hee & Nicol David (MAS)	Chris Walker & Fiona Geaves (ENG)
2006	Natalie Grinham & Joseph Kneipp (AUS)	Vicky Botwright & James Willstrop (ENG)	Rachael Grinham & David Palmer (AUS)
2010	Cameron Pilley & Kasey Brown (AUS)	Martin Knight & Joelle King (NZL)	Nicol David & Ong Beng Hee (MAS)
2014	Rachael Grinham & David Palmer (AUS)	Alison Waters & Peter Barker (ENG)	Kasey Brown & Cameron Pilley (AUS)
2018	Donna Urquhart & Cameron Pilley (AUS)	Dipika Pallikal Karthik & Saurav Ghosal (IND)	Joelle King & Paul Coll (NZL)
