= 1998 Women's British Open Squash Championship =

British Open Squash Championships
- 70th Women's British Open Championships

Details
- Location: Birmingham, England
- Venue: National Indoor Arena

The 1998 Women's British Open Squash Championships was held at the National Indoor Arena in Birmingham from 27 March- 5 April 1998. The event was won by Michelle Martin for the sixth consecutive year defeating Sarah Fitzgerald for a third successive year in the final.

== Seeds ==
1. (Australia) Sarah Fitzgerald
2. (Australia) Michelle Martin
3. (England) Sue Wright
4. (England) Cassie Jackman
5. (Australia) Carol Owens
6. (Germany) Sabine Schoene
7. (England) Suzanne Horner (née Burgess)
8. (Australia) Liz Irving
9. (England) Linda Charman
10. (England) Jane Martin
11. (England) Fiona Geaves
12. (South Africa) Claire Nitch
13. (New Zealand) Leilani Joyce (Marsh)
14. (New Zealand) Philippa Beams
15. (Australia) Robyn Cooper
16. (South Africa) Natalie Grainger

== Draw and results ==
=== First round ===
Player One	Player Two	Score
(Australia) Sarah Fitzgerald	(Scotland) Senga Macfie	9-4 9-2 9-1
(Australia) Michelle Martin	(England) Stephanie Brind	9-5 9-1 ret
(England) Sue Wright	(Netherlands) Vanessa Atkinson	9-7 6-9 9-3 9-3
(England) Cassie Jackman	(Australia) Toni Weeks	9-4 9-0 9-3
(Australia) Carol Owens	(South Africa) Sianne Cawdry	9-6 6-9 9-1 9-4
(Germany) Sabine Schoene	(England) Jenny Tranfield	9-6 9-3 9-1
(England) Suzanne Horner (née Burgess)	(England) Alison Wray	9-3 9-2 9-5
(Australia) Liz Irving	(Wales) Tegwen Malik	9-5 1-9 9-7 8-9 9-5
(England) Linda Charman	(Wales) Karen Hargreaves	9-0 9-3 9-3
(England) Jane Martin	(Canada) Melanie Jans	9-2 9-3 9-0
(England) Fiona Geaves	(Australia) Rachael Grinham	9-6 9-1 9-6
(South Africa) Claire Nitch	(England) Tracey Shenton	4-9 9-7 5-9 3-9
(New Zealand) Leilani Joyce (Marsh)	(Egypt) Maha Zein	10-9 9-3 9-1
(New Zealand) Philippa Beams	(England) Janie Thacker	8-10 2-9 8-10
(Australia) Robyn Cooper	(England) Rebecca Macree	9-6 4-9 1-9 10-9 10-8
(South Africa) Natalie Grainger	(Netherlands) Hugoline van Hoorn	9-2 9-6 9-0

=== Second round ===
Player One	Player Two	Score
(Australia) Fitzgerald	(England) Macree	9-3 9-2 9-1
(Australia) Martin M	(England) Charman	10-8 9-4 9-5
(England) Wright	(South Africa) Grainger	3-9 9-6 9-4 9-5
(England) Jackman	(England) Thacker	9-6 9-3 9-0
(Australia) OwenS	(England) Martin J	9-5 3-9 9-6 10-8
(Germany) Schoene	(New Zealand) Joyce	7-9 9-4 9-0 6-9 9-7
(England) Horner	(England) Shenton	9-4 9-2 9-4
(Australia) Irving	(England) Geaves	4-9 9-5 6-9 6-9

=== Quarter finals ===
Player One	Player Two	Score
(Australia) Fitzgerald	(England) Geaves	9-1 9-6 9-5
(Australia) Martin	(Australia) OwenS	9-5 9-6 9-2
(England) Wright	(England) Horner	10-8 9-4 9-5
(England) Jackman	(Germany) Schoene	10-8 9-6 9-7

=== Semi finals ===
Player One	Player Two	Score
(Australia) Fitzgerald	(England) Jackman	6-9 9-4 9-4 9-4
(Australia) Martin	(England) Wright	1-9 9-4 7-9 9-2 9-4

=== Final ===
Player One	Player Two	Score
(Australia) Martin	(Australia) Fitzgerald	9-4 9-2 9-1

Preceded by 1997	British Open Squash Championships; England (Birmingham); 1998	Succeeded by 1999
