= 1993 Women's British Open Squash Championship =

British Open Squash Championships
- 65th Women's British Open Championships

Details
- Location: London, England
- Venue: Lambs Squash Club & Wembley Conference Centre

The 1993 Hi-Tec British Open Squash Championships was held at the Lambs Squash Club with the later stages being held at the Wembley Conference Centre in London from 10–19 April 1993. The event was won by Michelle Martin who defeated Suzanne Horner (née Burgess) in the final.

== Seeds ==
1. (Australia) Michelle Martin
2. (New Zealand) Susan Devoy
3. (Guernsey) Martine Le Moignan
4. (England) Cassie Jackman
5. (Australia) Liz Irving
6. (England) Sue Wright
7. (England) Suzanne Horner (née Burgess)
8. (Canada) Heather Wallace
9. (Australia) Sarah Fitzgerald

== Draw and results ==
=== Qualifying round ===
Player One	Player Two	Score
(Scotland) Emma Donaldson	(India) Misha Grewal	9–1 9–3 9–7
(South Africa) Sianne Cawdry	(England) Alison Wray	9–7 9–6 9–0
(United States) Ellie Pierce	(France) Corrine Vezine	9–6 10–8 9–7
(Australia) Robyn Cooper	(France) Corinne Castets	9–1 9–3 9–0
(England) Sarah Spacey	(United States) Berkeley Belknap	10–8 9–1 9–1
(Republic of Ireland) Aisling McArdle	(Germany) Sandy Suck	9–3 10–8 9–5
(England) Senga Macfie	(England) Sally Felton	9–5 3–9 9–2 9–0
(England) Donna Vardy	(Germany) Simone Korell	9–1 9–3 9–1

=== First round ===
Player One	Player Two	Score
(Australia) Michelle Martin	(South Africa) Sianne Cawdry	9–0 9–3 9–3
(England) Fiona Geaves	(Germany) Sandy Suck	9–3 9–0 9–4
(Canada) Heather Wallace	(Australia) Toni Weeks	9–1 9–4 9–2
(Australia) Sharon Bradey	(Republic of Ireland) Aisling McArdle	9–3 9–3 9–1
(England) Sue Wright	(United States) Ellie Pierce	2–9 9–2 9–3 9–4
(Republic of Ireland) Rebecca O'Callaghan (née Best)	(United States) Demer Holleran	9–3 9–3 9–4
(England) Cassie Jackman	(New Zealand) Philippa Beams	9–3 9–1 9–2
(Germany) Sabine Schoene	(England) Donna Vardy	9–5 6–9 9–5 9–4
(England) Suzanne Horner (née Burgess)	(Australia) Danielle Drady	9–6 9–6 9–5
(England) Jane Martin	(Australia) Robyn Cooper	7–9 9–2 9–4 9–7
(Australia) Liz Irving	(England) Sarah Spacey	9–2 9–5 9–0
(England) Rebecca Macree	(Netherlands) Hugoline Van Hoorn	9–7 9–6 9–3
(Australia) Sarah Fitzgerald	(Scotland) Emma Donaldson	9–2 9–0 9–4
(England) Linda Charman	(South Africa) Claire Nitch	3–9 9–7 9–5 9–2
(Guernsey) Martine Le Moignan	(Netherlands) Marjolein Houtsma	9–0 9–2 9–0
(England) Senga Macfie	(Finland) Tuula Myllyniemi	10–9 9–4 9–4

=== Second round ===
Player One	Player Two	Score
(Australia) Martin M	(England) Geaves	9–3 9–2 9–2
(Canada) Wallace	(Australia) Bradey	9–3 9–5 8–10 9–4
(England) Wright	(Republic of Ireland) O'Callaghan	9–4 9–2 9–6
(England) Jackman	(Germany) Schoene	9–3 9–0 9–3
(England) Horner	(England) Martin J	9–5 9–4 9–1
(Australia) Irving	(England) Macree	9–0 9–4 10–8
(Australia) Fitzgerald	(England) Charman	9–1 9–2 9–0
(Guernsey) Le Moignan	(England) Macfie	9–3 9- 9–3

=== Quarter-finals ===
Player One	Player Two	Score
(Australia) Martin	(Canada) Wallace	9–2 9–4 9–4
(England) Wright	(England) Jackman	10–8 9–4 9–6
(England) Horner	(Australia) Irving	9–7 2–9 10–8 10–9
(Australia) Fitzgerald	(Guernsey) Le Moignan	10–8 4–9 10–8 9–1

=== Semi-finals ===
Player One	Player Two	Score
(Australia) Martin	(England) Wright	9–2 10–9 10–8
(England) Horner	(Australia) Fitzgerald	10–9 6–9 0–9 9–6 9–4

=== Final ===
Player One	Player Two	Score
(Australia) Martin	(England) Horner	9–7 9–0 9–4

Preceded by 1992	British Open Squash Championships; England (London); 1993	Succeeded by 1994
