= 2003 Women's British Open Squash Championship =

British Open Squash Championships
- 75th Women's British Open Championships

Details
- Location: Nottingham, England
- Venue: Albert Hall

The 2003 Women's British Open Squash Championships was held at the Albert Hall in Nottingham from 29 September – 5 October 2003. The event was won by Rachael Grinham who defeated Cassie Jackman (Campion) in the final.

== Seeds ==
1. (Australia) Carol Owens
2. (United States) Natalie Grainger (Pohrer)
3. (Australia) Rachael Grinham
4. (England) Linda Charman
5. (England) Vicky Botwright
6. (England) Cassie Jackman (Campion)
7. (Australia) Natalie Grinham
8. (England) Rebecca Macree

== Draw and results ==
=== First qualifying round ===
Player One	Player Two	Score
(New Zealand) Shelley Kitchen	(England) Alison Waters	9-6 9-1 9-2
(England) Jenny Duncalf	(England) Kate Roe	9-2 9-1 9-2
(Malaysia) Nicol David	(Scotland) Wendy Maitland	9-2 9-6 9-0
(France) Isabelle Stoehr	(England) Vicky Lankester	5-9 4-9 9-5 9-6 9-7
(England) Dominique Lloyd-Walter	(Malaysia) Sharon Wee	9-6 9-0 9-4
(England) Laura Lengthorn	(Scotland) Pamela Nimmo	9-6 1-9 9-5 8-10 9-5
(Wales) Tegwen Malik	(Netherlands) Annelize Naudé	9-3 1-9 9-0 9-1
(Pakistan) Carla Khan	(Republic of Ireland) Madeline Perry	6-9 9-5 0-9 9-5 10-8

=== Second qualifying round ===
Player One	Player Two	Score
(New Zealand) Kitchen	(England) Duncalf	9-2 9-7 9-2
(Malaysia) David	(France) Stoehr	9-6 9-4 9-4
(England) Lengthorn	(England) Lloyd-Walter	10-9 6-9 9-3 9-4
(Pakistan) Khan	(Wales) Malik	9-2 9-5 5-9 9-0

=== First round ===
Player One	Player Two	Score
(New Zealand) Carol Owens	(New Zealand) Shelley Kitchen	9-6 9-2 9-7
(United States) Natalie Grainger	(Malaysia) Nicol David	9-0 9-2 9-4
(Australia) Rachael Grinham	(England) Fiona Geaves	9-2 9-2 9-6
(England) Linda Charman	(England) Jenny Tranfield	w/o
(England) Vicky Botwright	(Netherlands) Vanessa Atkinson	9-5 7-9 9-3 9-4
(England) Cassie Jackman (Campion)	(England) Laura Lengthorn	9-2 93- 9-1
(Australia) Natalie Grinham	(England) Stephanie Brind	9-6 9-2 9-7
(England) Rebecca Macree	(Pakistan) Carla Khan	9-5 10-9 9-0

=== Quarter finals ===
Player One	Player Two	Score
(New Zealand) Owens	(Australia) Grinham N	9-2 10-8 9-3
(United States) Grainger	(England) Macree	9-3 9-6 9-1
(Australia) Grinham R	(England) Botwright	10-9 9-0 5-9 9-4
(England) Charman	(England) Jackman	1-9 5-9 7-9

=== Semi finals ===
Player One	Player Two	Score
(New Zealand) Owens	(Australia) Grinham R	5-9 7-9 3-9
(United States) Grainger	(England) Jackman	6-9 5-9 7-9

=== Final ===
Player One	Player Two	Score
(Australia) Grinham R	(England) Jackman	9-3 7-9 9-2 9-5

Preceded by 2002	British Open Squash Championships; England (Nottingham); 2003	Succeeded by 2004
