= 2004 Women's British Open Squash Championship =

British Open Squash Championships
- 76th Women's British Open Championships

Details
- Location: Nottingham, England
- Venue: Nottingham SRC & Albert Hall

The 2004 Women's Harris British Open Squash Championships was held at the Nottingham Squash Rackets Club with the later stages being held at the Albert Hall in Nottingham from 29 October - 7 November 2004. The event was won for the second consecutive year by Rachael Grinham who defeated Natalie Grainger in the final.

== Seeds ==
1. (Australia) Rachael Grinham
2. (England) Cassie Jackman (Campion)
3. (Netherlands) Vanessa Atkinson
4. (United States) Natalie Grainger
5. (England) Linda Elriani (née Charman)
6. (England) Fiona Geaves
7. (Malaysia) Nicol David
8. (England) Rebecca Macree
9. (Egypt) Omneya Abdel Kawy
10. (England) Jenny Duncalf
11. (England) Jenny Tranfield
12. (England) Vicky Botwright
13. (New Zealand) Shelley Kitchen
14. (France) Isabelle Stoehr
15. (Republic of Ireland) Madeline Perry
16. (England) Tania Bailey

== Draw and results ==
=== First round ===
Player One	Player Two	Score
(Australia) Rachael Grinham	(England) Stephanie Brind	9-0 9-5 9-3
(England) Cassie Jackman (Campion)	(United States) Latasha Khan	9-2 9-2 9-6
(Netherlands) Vanessa Atkinson	(Scotland) Pamela Nimmo	9-0 9-4 9-2
(United States) Natalie Grainger	(England) Becky Botwright	9-2 9-4 9-4
(England) Linda Elriani (née Charman)	(England) Alison Waters	9-5 10-8 9-6
(England) Fiona Geaves	(Malaysia) Sharon Wee	8-10 0-9 6-9
(Malaysia) Nicol David	(Canada) Runa Reta	9-3 9-5 9-2
(England) Rebecca Macree	(Egypt) Engy Kheirallah	9-6 9-6 9-5
(Egypt) Omneya Abdel Kawy	(Pakistan) Carla Khan	9-4 6-9 8-10 9-5 9-6
(England) Jenny Duncalf	(Italy) Manuela Manetta	9-0 9-4 9-2
(England) Jenny Tranfield	(England) Dominique Lloyd-Walter	10-8 9-3 9-0
(England) Vicky Botwright	(England) Lauren Briggs	9-3 9-4 9-1
(New Zealand) Shelley Kitchen	(Wales) Tegwen Malik	w/o
(France) Isabelle Stoehr	(Netherlands) Annelize Naudé	3-9 9-6 9-5 2-9 9-7
(Republic of Ireland) Madeline Perry	(England) Laura Lengthorn	9-6 9-5 6-9 0-9 0-9
(England) Tania Bailey	(Denmark) Line Hansen	9-0 9-0 9-3

=== Second round ===
Player One	Player Two	Score
(Australia) Grinham R	(England) Botwright	5-9 9-7 9-2 9-3
(Malaysia) David	(England) Bailey	w/o
(England) Jackman	(New Zealand) Kitchen	4-9 9-2 9-4 9-3
(England) Elriani	(England) Lengthorn	9-7 9-7 9-4
(Nebraska) Atkinson	(England) Tranfield	9-7 9-2 9-4
(England) Duncalf	(England) Macree	4-9 9-4 9-0 10-9
(United States) Grainger	(France) Stoehr	9-3 9-7 2-9 9-6
(Egypt) Kawy	(Malaysia) Wee	9-2 9-4 9-1

=== Quarter finals ===
Player One	Player Two	Score
(Australia) Grinham R	(Malaysia) David	10-8 9-2 9-1
(England) Jackman	(England) Elriani	10-8 9-3 9-2
(Netherlands) Atkinson	(England) Duncalf	9-4 9-2 9-4
(United States) Grainger	(Egypt) Kawy	9-0 9-6 9-2

=== Semi finals ===
Player One	Player Two	Score
(Australia) Grinham R	(Netherlands) Atkinson	7-9 1-9 10-9 9-6 9-2
(England) Jackman	(United States) Grainger	1-9 6-9 9-1 3-9

=== Final ===
Player One	Player Two	Score
(Australia) Grinham R	(United States) Grainger	3-9 9-5 9-0 9-3

Preceded by 2003	British Open Squash Championships; England (Nottingham); 2004	Succeeded by 2005
