= Golden Open =

City of Kalgoorlie & Boulder Golden Open

Details
- Event name: Golden Open
- Location: Kalgoorlie, Australia

Men's PSA World Tour
- Category: World Tour PSA 5
- Prize money: $5,000
- Most recent champion(s): (Australia) Mike Corren, (Australia) Tamika Saxby

The City of Kalgoorlie & Boulder Golden Open, or simply the Golden Open, is a yearly professional squash tournament held in Kalgoorlie, Australia. It is part of the PSA World Tour and WSA World Tour.

== Results ==
These are the results from 2016 onwards:

=== 2016 ===
Tournament	Date	Champion	Runner-Up	Semifinalists	Quarterfinalists
2016 Men; PSA 5 $5,000	3–5 June	(Australia) Mike Corren; 16–14, 8–11, 11–9, 11–6	(South Korea) Ko Youngjo	(England) Adam Murrills (Australia) Rhys Dowling	(Hong Kong) Chris Lo (Australia) Solayman Nowrozi (Hong Kong) Tsz Kwan Lau (South Korea) JongMyoung Park

=== 2017 ===
Tournament	Date	Champion	Runner-Up	Semifinalists	Quarterfinalists
2017 Men; PSA 5 $5,000	3–5 June	(Australia) Mike Corren; 16–14, 8–11, 11–9, 11–6	(Australia) Rhys Dowling	(Australia) Thomas Calvert (Australia) Solayman Nowrozi	(Australia) David Ilich (Australia) Courtney West (Australia) Alex Eustace (Australia) Joseph White
2017 Women; PSA 5 $5,000	3–5 June	(Australia) Tamika Saxby; 7–11, 11–6, 11–4, 11–5	(Australia) Samantha Foyle	(Australia) Zoe Petrovansky (Australia) Amanda Hopps	(Malaysia) Aika Azman (Australia) Taylor Flavell (Australia) Lauren Aspinall (Australia) Cindy Meintjes

== See also ==
- PSA World Tour
- WSA World Tour
