= Julie Hawkes =

Squash player

Julie Hawkes (née Lamb; born 1948 in New Zealand) is a former professional squash player who represented Hong Kong for the majority of her career.

== Early life and education ==
Hawkes completed her secondary education at Matamata College in 1966, where she excelled in tennis and netball and served as head girl. She discovered squash while pursuing a degree in physical education at the University of Otago, later completing her teachers' training at Auckland Teachers' College. Following her move to Wellington, Hawkes played squash for New Zealand and achieved the rank of number two on the women's team. In 1975, she competed with the New Zealand Women's Team in South Africa.

== Career ==
After marrying lawyer and tennis player Richard Hawkes, the family relocated to Hong Kong, where Julie began representing Hong Kong in international squash tournaments. She achieved significant success, winning local and regional competitions and becoming the Women's Over 35 World Champion at the World Master Squash Championships in 1985. In recognition of her achievements, she received the "Outstanding Athlete" award from Hong Kong Squash on the 40th anniversary of its founding.

== Coaching and recognition ==
After retiring from playing, Hawkes transitioned to coaching, notably coaching squash champion Leilani Rorani. Her coaching efforts were acknowledged in 2003 when she received a New Zealand "Prime Minister’s Coach Professional Development Scholarship." In 2007, she was honored as New Zealand's Squash Coach of the Year. She also served as a World Squash Foundation (WSF) Referee.

== Personal life ==
The Hawkes family resided in Hong Kong for twenty-three years. Julie and Richard Hawkes have four children, one of whom, Jaclyn Hawkes, is also involved in squash, playing for New Zealand. Jaclyn Hawkes won a medal in Women's Doubles Squash at the 2010 Commonwealth Games.

== Awards ==
- International Championships (representing Hong Kong)
  - Second place, Champion, East Asian Women’s Squash Championship
  - Champion, Women's Over 35, World Master Squash Championships (1985).
  - Champion, Women's Individual, 3rd Asian Squash Championships (22 Jan – 1 Feb 1986, Kuala Lumpur, Malaysia)
  - Champion, Women's Over 35, World Masters Squash Championships (1987, Auckland, New Zealand).
  - Second place, Champion, Women's Over 40, World Master Squash Championships (1989).
- Other Championships:
  - Squash Women's Cup Champion, Hong Kong Football Club (1990-1992)
  - Squash Ladies' Cup Champion, Hong Kong Football Club (1984-1985, 1987-1990)
