= Squash at the 1998 Commonwealth Games =

Squash tournament

- Venue: National Squash Centre, National Sports Complex
- Location: Bukit Jalil, Kuala Lumpur, Malaysia
- Dates: 10 to 21 September 1998

Squash at the 1998 Commonwealth Games was the inaugural appearance of the Squash at the Commonwealth Games. The events were held in Kuala Lumpur, Malaysia, from 11 to 21 September 1998. There were no bronze medal play off matches because both losing semi-finalists were awarded a bronze medal.

The squash events were held the National Squash Centre, which was part of the National Sports Complex in Bukit Jalil. The venue was specifically built for the Games and included a show court with seating for 1,000 spectators.

Australia topped the squash medal table by virtue of winning two more silver medals than England.

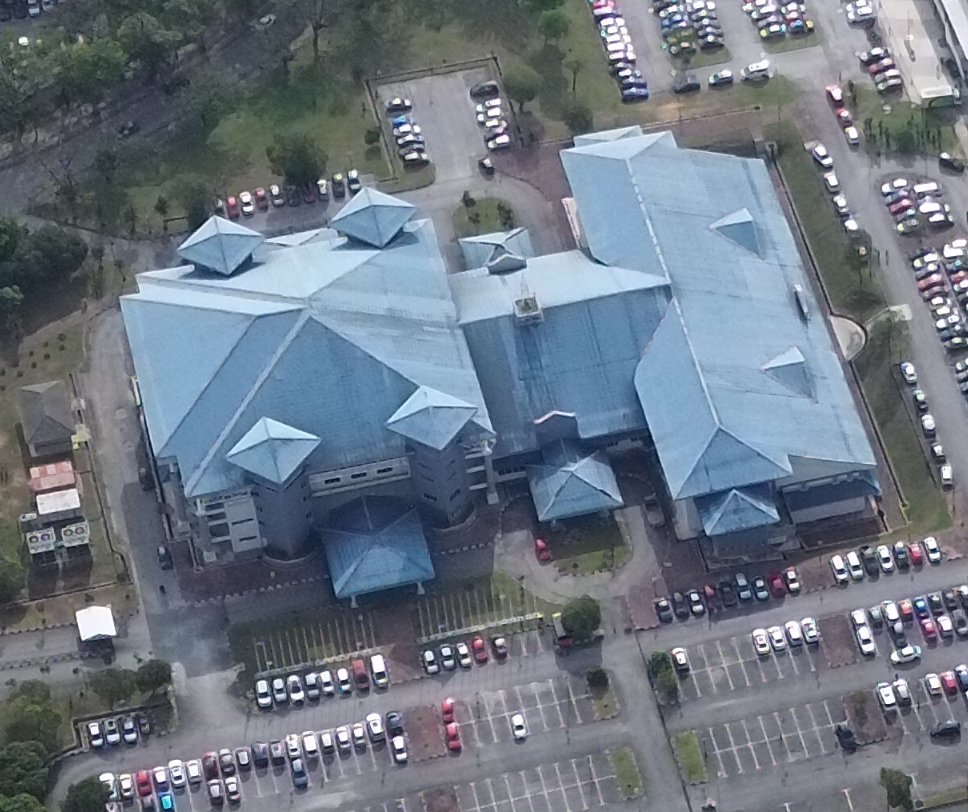
Aerial view of the National Squash Centre

== Medal table ==
* Host nation (Malaysia)

Rank	Nation	Gold	Silver	Bronze	Total
1	Australia	2	3	1	6
2	England	2	1	4	7
3	Scotland	1	0	1	2
4	Canada	0	1	0	1
5	South Africa	0	0	2	2
6	New Zealand	0	0	1	1
6	Wales	0	0	1	1
Totals (7 entries)		5	5	10	20

== Medallists ==
Event	Gold	Silver	Bronze
Men's singles	Peter Nicol (SCO)	Jonathon Power (CAN)	Alex Gough (WAL); Paul Johnson (ENG)
Women's singles	Michelle Martin (AUS)	Sarah Fitz-Gerald (AUS)	Cassie Jackman (ENG); Sue Wright (ENG)
Men's doubles	Mark Chaloner & Paul Johnson (ENG)	Byron Davis & Rodney Eyles (AUS)	Mark Cairns & Chris Walker (ENG); Stuart Cowie & Peter Nicol (SCO)
Women's doubles	Cassie Jackman & Sue Wright (ENG)	Robyn Cooper & Rachael Grinham (AUS)	Sarah Fitz-Gerald & Carol Owens (AUS); Natalie Grainger & Claire Nitch (RSA)
Mixed doubles	Craig Rowland & Michelle Martin (AUS)	Simon Parke & Suzanne Horner (ENG)	Glen Wilson & Sarah Cook (NZL); Rodney Durbach & Natalie Grainger (RSA)

== Results ==
=== Men's singles (10-16 Sep) ===
Last 16
1	(Scotland) Peter Nicol	9	9	9
(Canada) Graham Ryding	4	4	1
7	(England) Mark Chaloner	9	9	2	9	9
(Scotland) Martin Heath	2	6	9	10	5
6	(England) Paul Johnson	10	9	9
(Australia) Craig Rowland	9	5	5
3	(Australia) Rodney Eyles	10	7	9	9
(Australia) David Palmer	9	9	2	7
2	(Canada) Jonathon Power	9	9	9
(Pakistan) Zarak Jahan Khan	6	0	4
(Wales) David Evans	9	0	2	9	9
5	(England) Simon Parke	4	9	9	5	1
4	(Wales) Alex Gough	9	9	3	9
(Malaysia) Kenneth Low	6	1	9	7
(South Africa) Craig Wapnick	4	9	9	9
(Australia) Byron Davis	9	4	4	4

Quarter finals
1	(Scotland) Nicol	9	9	9
7	(England) Chaloner	5	2	3
6	(England) Johnson	9	10	9
3	(Australia) Eyles	2	8	1
2	(Canada) Power	9	9	9
(Wales) Evans	1	2	2
4	(Wales) Gough	9	9	10
(South Africa) Wapnick	6	0	8

Semi finals
1	(Scotland) Nicol	9	9	9
6	(England) Johnson	2	3	1
2	(Canada) Power	9	9	9
4	(Wales) Gough	4	2	4

Final
1	(Scotland) Nicol	2	9	9	2	9
2	(Canada) Power	9	2	1	9	2

=== Women's singles (10-16 Sep) ===
Last 16
1	(Australia) Sarah Fitz-Gerald	9	9	9
(South Africa) Natalie Grainger	5	0	0
5	(England) Suzanne Horner	9	9	9
(South Africa) Carla Venter	2	2	5
3	(England) Cassie Jackman	7	9	9	6	10
(South Africa) Claire Nitch	9	1	4	9	8
6	(Australia) Carol Owens	9	9	9
(Malaysia) Leong Siu Lynn	2	2	4
2	(Australia) Michelle Martin	9	10	9
(Australia) Robyn Cooper	3	8	3
8	(England) Linda Charman	9	9	9
(Malaysia) Nicol David	6	6	0
4	(England) Sue Wright	9	9	9
(Guernsey) Lisa Opie	1	2	5
7	(New Zealand) Leilani Joyce	9	5	9	9
(Scotland) Senga Macfie	3	9	2	5

Quarter finals
1	(Australia) Fitz-Gerald	9	9	9
5	(England) Horner	3	1	4
3	(England) Jackman	10	9	9
6	(Australia) Owens	8	2	1
2	(Australia) Martin	9	9	9
8	(England) Charman	1	1	4
4	(England) Wright	9	9	4	1	9
7	(New Zealand) Joyce	2	6	9	9	0

Semi finals
1	(Australia) Fitz-Gerald	9	9	9
3	(England) Jackman	2	0	2
2	(Australia) Martin	9	9	9
4	(England) Wright	7	1	2

Final
1	(Australia) Fitz-Gerald	0	6	5
2	(Australia) Martin	9	9	9

=== Men's doubles (17-20 Sep) ===
Quarter finals
(England) Chris Walker & Mark Cairns	15	15
(Malaysia) Kenneth Low & Michael Soo	7	10
(Australia) Rodney Eyles & Byron Davis	12	15	17
(Australia) David Palmer & Paul Price	15	12	15
(England) Paul Johnson & Mark Chaloner	15	15	15
(Wales) Alex Gough & David Evans	17	6	12
(Scotland) Peter Nicol & Stuart Cowie	15	15
(Canada) Graham Ryding & Jonathon Power	3	7

Semi finals
(England) Walker & Cairns	15	12	10
(Australia) Eyles & Davis	4	15	15
(England) Johnson & Chaloner	15	17
(Scotland) Nicol & Cowie	10	14

Final
(Australia) Eyles & Davis	8	4
(England) Johnson & Chaloner	15	15

=== Women's doubles (17-20 Sep) ===
Quarter finals
(England) Sue Wright & Cassie Jackman	17	6	15
(England) Linda Charman & Jane Martin	16	15	10
(Australia) Sarah Fitz-Gerald & Carol Owens	15	15
(Malaysia) Nicol David & Leong Siu Lynn	9	10
(Australia) Robyn Cooper & Rachael Grinham	17	15	15
(New Zealand) Leilani Joyce & Philippa Beams	15	17	13
(South Africa) Claire Nitch & Natalie Grainger	15	17
(South Africa) Angelique Clifton Parks & Annelize Naudé	11	15

Semi finals
(England) Wright & Jackman	13	17	15
(Australia) Fitz-Gerald & Owens	15	14	5
(Australia) Cooper & Grinham	15	15
(South Africa) Nitch & Grainger	7	9

Final
(England) Wright & Jackman	15	15
(Australia) Cooper & Grinham	10	12

=== Mixed doubles (17-20 Sep) ===
Quarter finals
(Australia) Craig Rowland & Michelle Martin	15	15
(Scotland) Stuart Cowie & Senga Macfie	9	6
(South Africa) Rodney Durbach & Natalie Grainger	15	11	15
(New Zealand) Wayne Werder & Fiona Dean	10	15	7
(England) Simon Parke & Suzanne Horner	15	6	15
(South Africa) Craig Van der Wath & Claire Nitch	12	15	9
(New Zealand) Glen Wilson & Sarah Cook	15	15
(Wales) Gareth Davies & Katrina Hogan	4	13

Semi finals
(Australia) Rowland & Martin	15	15
(South Africa) Durbach & Grainger	9	11
(England) Parke & Horner	15	15
(New Zealand) Wilson & Cook	13	8

Final
(Australia) Rowland & Martin	15	15
(England) Parke & Horner	4	7
