= World Masters Squash Championships =

WSF World Masters

Details
- Event name: World Masters Squash Championships

Men's Winner
- Most recent champion(s): (South Africa) Christo Potgieter

Women's Winner
- Most recent champion(s): (Guyana) Nicolette Fernandes

The World Masters Squash Championships are an international squash competition organised by the World Squash Federation and played between players for athletes over the age of 35 years. World Masters are divided into ten categories — Over 35, Over 40, Over 45, Over 50, Over 55, Over 60, Over 65, Over 70, Over 75 and Over 80.

== Past results ==
=== Men's championship ===
Year	Location	Over 35	Over 40	Over 45	Over 50	Over 55	Over 60	Over 65	Over 70	Over 75	Over 80
1976	(England) London	NA	NA	(Australia) Mal Buck	NA	(India) Jamal Din	NA	NA	NA	NA	NA
1977	(Canada) Toronto	NA	NA	(Zambia) Harry O'Connor	NA	NA	NA	NA	NA	NA	NA
1979	(Canada) Toronto	NA	NA	(Australia) Kevin Adams	NA	NA	NA	NA	NA	NA	NA
1979	(Australia) Brisbane	NA	NA	(Australia) Len Atkins	NA	NA	NA	NA	NA	NA	NA
1983	(New Zealand) Auckland	NA	NA	(Australia) Ken Hiscoe	NA	NA	NA	NA	NA	NA	NA
1987	(England) Birmingham	(England) Hiddy Jahan	(Egypt) Ali Aziz	(England) Mo Yasin	NA	NA	NA	NA	NA	NA	NA
1991	(New Zealand) Auckland	(Australia) Dean Williams	(New Zealand) Trevor Colyer	(Australia) Gregory Robberds	(New Zealand) Barry Gardiner	(Australia) Ian Hocking	(New Zealand) Arthur Wright	NA	NA	NA	NA
1993	(Scotland) Edinburgh	(England) David Pearson	(England) Ahmed Safwat	(South Africa) Roy Plumstead	(England) Peter Wright	(England) Pat Kirton	(Australia) Ian Hocking	NA	NA	NA	NA
1995	(Australia) Melbourne	(Germany) Ashraf Hanafi	(Australia) Ian Freeme	(Australia) Brian Cook	(Australia) Max Samblebe	(Australia) Fred Howell	(Australia) Terry Rippon	(Australia) Max Smyth	(Australia) Fred Green	(Australia) Vic Hunt	NA
1997	(South Africa) Johannesburg	(South Africa) Trevor Wilkinson	(South Africa) Pierr Roodt	(South Africa) Charlie Bent	(South Africa) Roy Plumstead	(South Africa) Bert van Es	(England) John Cox	(South Africa) Peter Fahrenheim	(South Africa) Cecil Kaplan	NA	NA
1999	(England) Sheffield	(Sweden) Fredrik Johnson	(New Zealand) Ross Norman	(England) Robert Forde	(Egypt) Ahmed Safwat	(Australia) Peter Wright	(New Zealand) Barry Gardiner	(England) John Cox	(South Africa) John Cowper	NA	NA
2001	(Australia) Melbourne	(South Africa) Craig Van der Wath	(South Africa) Trevor Wilkinson	(Australia) Thomas Spark	(England) Ahmed Safwat	(New Zealand) Richard Purser	(Wales) Michael Thurgur	(England) Jeremy Lyon	(South Africa) Peter Fahrenheim	NA	NA
2003	(Finland) Espoo	(South Africa) Craig Van der Wath	(Singapore) Peter Hill	(Australia) Geoffrey Davenport	(South Africa) Alan Colburn	(Australia) Brian Cook	(England) John Perrott	(South Africa) Brian Heath	(England) John Cox	NA	NA
2006	(South Africa) Cape Town	(South Africa) Michael Tootill	(South Africa) Craig Van der Wath	(Australia) Geoffrey Davenport	(England) Peter Alexander	(England) Johnny Leslie	(Australia) Hugh Colburn	(England) Adrian Wright	(England) John Woodliffe	(South Africa) Peter Fahrenheim	NA
2008	(New Zealand) Christchurch	(Australia) Jason Mudge	(New Zealand) Gary Duberly	(South Africa) Trevor Wilkinson	(Australia) Geoffrey Davenport	(South Africa) Michael Bester	(Australia) Brian Cook	(New Zealand) Richard Purser	(New Zealand) Barry Gardiner	(South Africa) John Irving	NA
2010	(Germany) Cologne	(France) Renan Lavigne	(Republic of Ireland) Derek Ryan	(New Zealand) Gary Duberly	(Australia) Geoffrey Davenport	(England) Mark Cowley	(England) Keith Jones	(England) Chris Ansell	(Wales) Brian Phillips	(England) Malcolm Gilham	NA
2012	(England) Birmingham	(France) Renan Lavigne	(Australia) Craig Rowland	(South Africa) Craig Van der Wath	(Republic of Ireland) Willie Hosey	(South Africa) Pierr Roodt	(Cayman Islands) John Macrury	(England) Philip Ayton	(England) Adrian Wright	(England) Patrick Kirton	(South Africa) Peter Fahrenheim
2014	Hong Kong	(Egypt) Omar El Borolossy	(Australia) Craig Rowland	(South Africa) Craig Van der Wath	(Republic of Ireland) Willie Hosey	(Australia) Geoffrey Davenport	(Cayman Islands) John Macrury	(Australia) Brian Cook	(England) Adrian Wright	(United States) Michael Gough	(New Zealand) Trevor Coulter
2016	(South Africa) Johannesburg	(Egypt) Mohammed Abbas	(South Africa) Rodney Durbach	(England) Nick Taylor	(South Africa) Craig Van der Wath	(Republic of Ireland) Willie Hosey	(Germany) Udo Kahl	(Finland) Esa Matti Tuominen	(United States) Norbert Kornyei	(England) Adrian Wright	(England) Malcolm Gilham
2018	(United States) Charlottesville	(Netherlands) Laurens Jan Anjema	(Republic of Ireland) Liam Kenny	(England) Nick Taylor	(South Africa) Michael Tootill	(Australia) Brett Martin	(Australia) Geoffrey Davenport	(Cayman Islands) John Macrury	(Australia) Brian Cook	(Canada) Howard Armitage	(England) Lance Kinder
2022	(Poland) Wrocław	(South Africa) Christo Potgieter	(Gibraltar) Ivan Flores Vela	(Sweden) Christian Drakenberg	(Republic of Ireland) Derek Ryan	(Sweden) Fredrik Johnson	(Republic of Ireland) Willie Hosey	(South Africa) Pierr Roodt	(Cayman Islands) John Macrury	(Australia) Brian Cook	(United States) Michael Gough
2024	(Netherlands) Amsterdam	(Egypt) Omar Abdel Meguid	(Netherlands) L J Anjema	(Sweden) Christian Drakenberg	(Mexico) Marcos Mendez	(Germany) Predi Fritsche	(Singapore) Peter Hill	(Australia) Geoffery Davenport	(Finland) Kale Leskinen	(England) Larry Grover	(Canada) Gerald Poulton

=== Men's champions by country ===
Country	O-35	O-40	O-45	O-50	O-55	O-60	O-65	O-70	O-75	O-80	Total
Australia	2	3	9	3	6	5	3	2	2	0	35
England	2	1	4	3	3	3	5	4	4	2	31
South Africa	5	4	5	4	3	0	3	3	2	1	30
New Zealand	0	3	1	1	1	2	1	1	0	1	11
Ireland	0	2	0	3	1	1	0	0	0	0	7
Egypt	3	1	0	1	0	0	0	0	0	0	5
Sweden	1	0	2	0	1	0	0	0	0	0	4
Cayman Islands	0	0	0	0	0	2	1	1	0	0	4
Germany	1	0	0	0	1	1	0	0	0	0	3
United States	0	0	0	0	0	0	0	1	1	1	3
France	2	0	0	0	0	0	0	0	0	0	2
Netherlands	1	1	0	0	0	0	0	0	0	0	2
Singapore	0	1	0	0	0	1	0	0	0	0	2
Wales	0	0	0	0	0	1	0	1	0	0	2
Finland	0	0	0	0	0	0	1	1	0	0	2
Canada	0	0	0	0	0	0	0	0	1	1	2
Zambia	0	0	1	0	0	0	0	0	0	0	1
Mexico	0	0	0	1	0	0	0	0	0	0	1
India	0	0	0	0	1	0	0	0	0	0	1
Gibraltar	0	1	0	0	0	0	0	0	0	0	1

=== Women's championship ===
Year	Location	Over 35	Over 40	Over 45	Over 50	Over 55	Over 60	Over 65	Over 70	Over 75
1982	(Australia) Perth	(United States) Marianne Greenberg	(New Zealand) Jenny Webster	NA	NA	NA	NA	NA	NA	NA
1987	(New Zealand) Auckland	(Hong Kong) Julie Hawkes	(Australia) Robyn Prentice	(Australia) Heather McKay	(Australia) Jenny Irving	NA	NA	NA	NA	NA
1989	(Netherlands) Warmond	(England) Angela Smith	(England) Averil Murphy	(England) Bronwyn Barton	NA	NA	NA	NA	NA	NA
1990	(Australia) Sydney	(Australia) Vicki Cardwell	(Australia) Di Davis	(Australia) Heather McKay	(Australia) Rita Paulos	NA	NA	NA	NA	NA
1991	(New Zealand) Auckland	(New Zealand) Carol Chard	(Canada) Joyce Maycock	(New Zealand) Jenney Webster	(New Zealand) Kathy Hargreaves	NA	NA	NA	NA	NA
1992	(Canada) Vancouver	(Canada) Rebecca Rodgers	(Canada) Barbara Diggens	(England) Bett Dryhurst	(Canada) Joyce Davenport	NA	NA	NA	NA	NA
1993	(Scotland) Edinburgh	(England) Annette Pilling	(Canada) Barbara Diggens	(Canada) Joyce Maycock	(New Zealand) Heather McKay	(Australia) Margaret Doueal	NA	NA	NA	NA
1995	(Australia) Melbourne	(Australia) Kay Collins	(New Zealand) Carol Chard	(South Africa) Rem Swan	(New Zealand) Heather McKay	(Scotland) Irene Rowe	(Australia) Margaret Doueal	(Australia) Roma Casey	NA	NA
1997	(South Africa) Johannesburg	(Australia) Diane Ricardo	(South Africa) Helen van Tonder	(South Africa) Dee Thomas	(England) Bett Dryhurst	(New Zealand) Jenny Tyler	NA	NA	NA	NA
1999	(England) Sheffield	(England) Suzanne Horner	(England) Liz Brown	(England) Maggie North	(England) Bett Dryhurst	(South Africa) Jean Grainger	NA	NA	NA	NA
2001	(Australia) Melbourne	(England) Suzanne Horner	(Australia) Mary Sceney	(Australia) Vicki Cardwell	(Australia) Sue Volzke	(New Zealand) Jenny Webster	(England) Barbara Sanderson	(England) Evelyn Methven	NA	NA
2003	(Finland) Espoo	(South Africa) Angelique Clifton-Parks	(England) Susan Williams	(South Africa) Pauline Douglas	(England) Faith Sinclair	(England) Averil Murphy	(South Africa) Jean Grainger	NA	NA	NA
2006	(South Africa) Cape Town	(Australia) Sarah Fitz-Gerald	(South Africa) Angelique Clifton-Parks	(South Africa) Janet Van der Westhuizen	(Australia) Anne Richards	(Australia) Sue Volkze	(England) Ann Manley	(Republic of Ireland) Barbara Sanderson	NA	NA
2008	(New Zealand) Christchurch	(Australia) Amanda Hopps	(Australia) Sarah Nelson	(New Zealand) Kay Newman	(England) Julie Field	(Australia) Gaye Mitchell	(England) Averil Murphy	(South Africa) Jean Grainger	(South Africa) Averil Heath	NA
2010	(Germany) Cologne	(Germany) Sabine Schöne	(Germany) Simone Korell	(South Africa) Leora Greenwood	(England) Julie Field	(Australia) Vicki Cardwell	(England) Averil Murphy	(South Africa) Sheena Worwood	(Republic of Ireland) Barbara Sanderson	NA
2012	(England) Birmingham	(Germany) Sabine Schöne	(Germany) Simone Korell	(Australia) Michelle Martin	(Jamaica) Susan Lawrence	(England) Julie Field	(Australia) Sue Volkze	(England) Ann Manley	(Republic of Ireland) Barbara Sanderson	NA
2014	Hong Kong	(United States) Natalie Grainger	(Australia) Amanda Hopps	(Australia) Sarah Fitz-Gerald	(Australia) Sue Hilier	(Australia) Mary Sceney	(Scotland) Pauline Douglas	(England) Averil Murphy	(South Africa) Jean Grainger	NA
2016	(South Africa) Johannesburg	(United States) Natalie Grainger	(South Africa) Samantha Herbert	(Australia) Sarah Fitz-Gerald	(France) Mylene De Muylder	(England) Karen Hume	(England) Julie Field	(Australia) Marilyn Kennedy	(England) Ann Manley	(Republic of Ireland) Barbara Sanderson
2018	(United States) Charlottesville	(England) Lauren Briggs	(United States) Natalie Grainger	(Australia) Sarah Fitz-Gerald	(Canada) Lauren Wagner	(Australia) Susan Hillier	(England) Jill Campion	(Australia) Gaye Mitchell	(England) Ann Manley	(United States) Joyce Davenport
2022	(Poland) Wrocław	(Guyana) Nicolette Fernandes	(South Africa) Karen Blom	(South Africa) Samantha Herbert	(Barbados) Karen Meakins	(Australia) Kylee Hammett	(England) Mandy Akin	(England) Karen Hume	NA	(England) Ann Manley
2024	(Netherlands) Amsterdam	(South Africa) Lizelle Muller	(Guyana) Nicolette Fernandes	(England) Lauren Kinsey-Briggs	(Barbados) Karen Meakins	(Canada) Lauren Wagner	(Australia) Susan Hillier	(Republic of Ireland) Mary Sceney	(Scotland) Pauline Douglas	(England) Ann Manley

=== Women's champions by country ===
Country	O-35	O-40	O-45	O-50	O-55	O-60	O-65	O-70	O-75	Total
Australia	5	5	7	5	7	3	3	0	0	35
England	5	3	4	5	3	7	4	2	2	35
South Africa	2	4	6	0	1	1	2	2	0	17
New Zealand	1	2	2	3	2	0	0	0	0	10
Canada	1	3	1	2	1	0	0	0	0	8
United States	3	1	0	0	0	0	0	0	1	5
Ireland	0	0	0	0	0	0	2	2	1	5
Germany	2	2	0	0	0	0	0	0	0	4
Scotland	0	0	0	0	1	1	0	1	0	3
Guyana	1	1	0	0	0	0	0	0	0	2
Barbados	0	0	0	2	0	0	0	0	0	2
Hong Kong	1	0	0	0	0	0	0	0	0	1
France	0	0	0	1	0	0	0	0	0	1
Jamaica	0	0	0	1	0	0	0	0	0	1

== See also ==
- World Squash Federation
- World Masters Games
- World Open
