= 2003 European Squash Team Championships =

Squash tournament

- 31st
- Location: (England) Nottingham
- Venue: Nottingham Squash Club
- Date: 1 – 4 May 2003
- Website europeansquash.com

Results
- Champions: Men England; Women England

The 2003 European Squash Team Championships was the 31st edition of European Squash Team Championships for squash players. The event was held at the Nottingham Squash Club in Nottingham, England, from 1 to 4 May 2003. The tournament was organised by the European Squash Federation.

The England men's team won their 28th title and the England women's team won their 26th title.

== Men's tournament ==
=== Group stage ===
Group A

Pos	Team	P	W	D	L	Pts
1	England	3	3	0	0	6
2	Netherlands	3	2	0	1	4
3	Scotland	3	1	0	2	2
4	Switzerland	3	0	0	3	0

Group B

Pos	Team	P	W	D	L	Pts
1	France	3	3	0	0	6
2	Wales	3	2	0	1	4
3	Finland	3	1	0	2	2
4	Germany	3	0	0	3	0

=== Semi-finals ===
England
4
Semi-final 1

Wales
0

			1	2	3	4	5
1	(England) (Wales)	Peter Nicol; Alex Gough	9; 4	9; 1	9; 1
2	(England) (Wales)	Lee Beachill; David Evans	9; 4	9; 7	9; 1
3	(England) (Wales)	Simon Parke; Scott Fitzgerald	9; 3	9; 1	9; 1
4	(England) (Wales)	James Willstrop; Greg Tippings	9; 1	9; 0	9; 6

France
3
Semi-final 2

Netherlands
1

			1	2	3	4	5
1	(France) (Netherlands)	Thierry Lincou; Tommy Berden	9; 4	1; 9	9; 5	9; 6
2	(France) (Netherlands)	Gregory Gaultier; Lucas Buit	4; 9	1; 9	9; 1			retired
3	(France) (Netherlands)	Renan Lavigne; Laurens Jan Anjema	9; 7	2; 9	9; 5	9; 2
4	(France) (Netherlands)	Jean-Michel Arcucci; Michael Fiteni	9; 10	9; 6	9; 6	9; 2

=== Third place ===
Wales
3
Third place

Netherlands
1

			1	2	3	4	5
1	(Wales) (Netherlands)	Alex Gough; Tommy Berden	9; 2	2; 9	9; 9	9; 9
2	(Wales) (Netherlands)	David Evans; Lucas Buit	9; 7	9; 1	10; 8
3	(Wales) (Netherlands)	Gavin Jones; Laurens Jan Anjema	4; 9	9; 6	9; 5	9; 2
4	(Wales) (Netherlands)	Greg Tippings; Dylan Bennett	9; 10	10; 9	9; 0	2; 9	1; 9

=== Final ===
England
2 (9)
Final

France
2 (6)

			1	2	3	4	5
1	(England) (France)	James Willstrop; Jean-Michel Arcucci	9; 2	3; 9	9; 7	9; 3
2	(England) (France)	Simon Parke; Renan Lavigne	9; 3	2; 9	10; 8	9; 10	3; 9
3	(England) (France)	Peter Nicol; Thierry Lincou	9; 0	5; 9	10; 8	9; 0
4	(England) (France)	Lee Beachill; Grégory Gaultier	3; 9	9; 5				retired

== Women's tournament ==
=== Group stage ===
Group A

Pos	Team	P	W	L	Pts
1	England	3	3	0	6
2	Denmark	3	2	1	4
3	Belgium	3	1	2	2
4	Wales	3	0	3	0

Group B

Pos	Team	P	W	L	Pts
1	Netherlands	3	3	0	6
2	Scotland	3	2	1	4
3	Germany	3	1	2	2
4	France	3	0	3	0

=== Semi-finals ===
England
3
Semi-final 1

Scotland
0

			1	2	3	4	5
1	(England) (Scotland)	Cassie Jackman; Pamela Nimmo	9; 1	9; 4	9; 0
2	(England) (Scotland)	Linda Charman; Senga Macfie	9; 0	9; 1	9; 0
3	(England) (Scotland)	Jenny Tranfield; Frania Gillen-Buchert	9; 0	9; 0	9; 3

Netherlands
3
Semi-final 2

Denmark
0

			1	2	3	4	5
1	(Netherlands) (Denmark)	Vanessa Atkinson; Ellen Petersen	9; 2	9; 6	9; 1
2	(Netherlands) (Denmark)	Annelize Naudé; Line Hansen	8; 10	9; 3	5; 9	10; 8	9; 3
3	(Netherlands) (Denmark)	Margriet Huisman; Mette Jorgensen	9; 6	9; 4

=== Third place ===
Scotland
3
Third place

Denmark
0

			1	2	3	4	5
1	(Scotland) (Denmark)	Pamela Nimmo; Ellen Petersen	10; 9	9; 6	9; 7
2	(Scotland) (Denmark)	Wendy Maitland; Line Hansen	9; 1	9; 6
3	(Scotland) (Denmark)	Senga Macfie; Mette Jorgensen	9; 7	10; 8	9; 1

=== Final ===
England
2
Final

Netherlands
1

			1	2	3	4	5
1	(England) (Netherlands)	Cassie Jackman; Vanessa Atkinson	4; 9	9; 3	5; 9	9; 10
2	(England) (Netherlands)	Linda Charman; Annelize Naudé	9; 4	9; 2	9; 1
3	(England) (Netherlands)	Rebecca Macree; Karen Kronemeyer	9; 4	10; 8	9; 2
