= Lance Kinder =

English squash player (1935–2023)

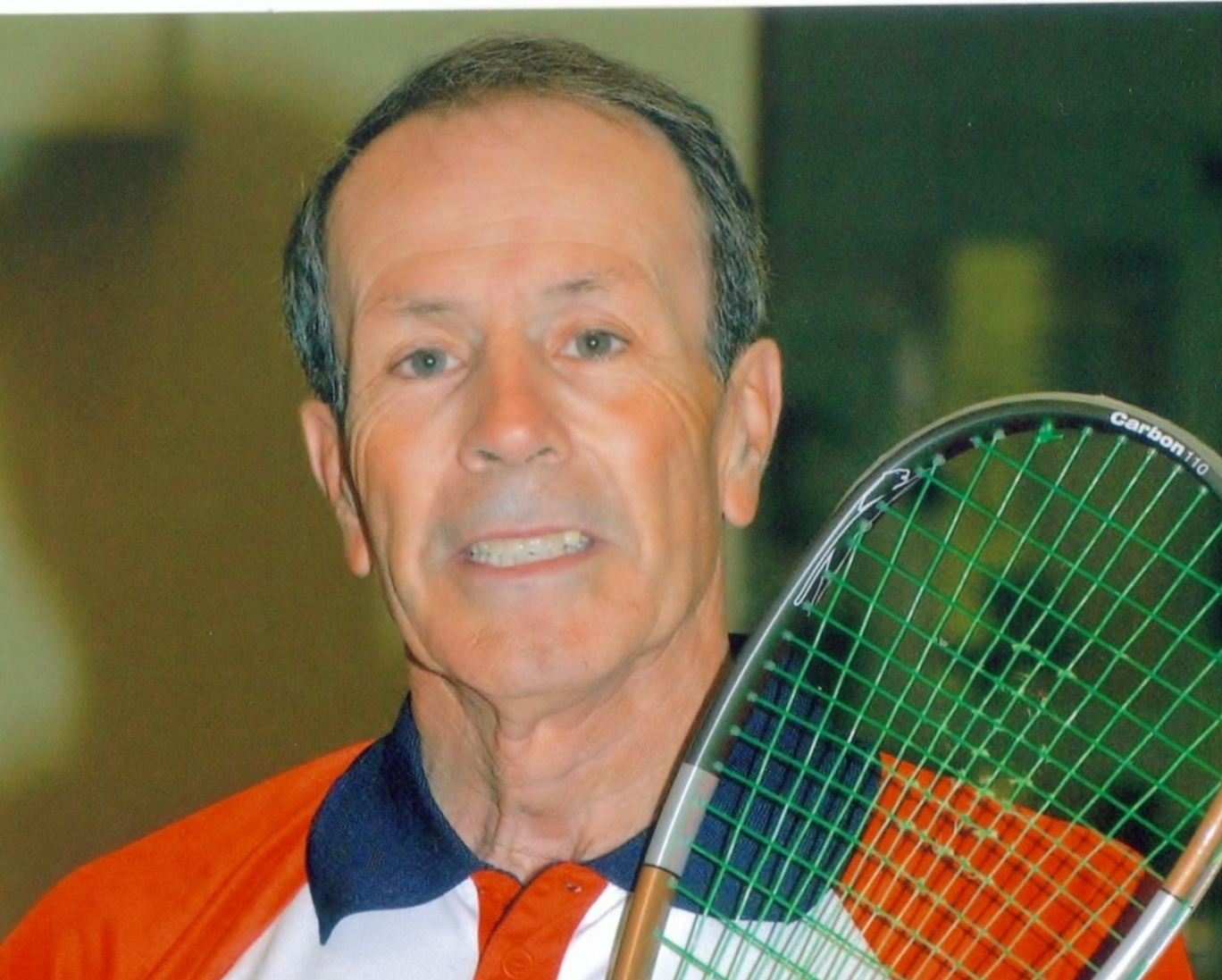
- Portrait of Lance Kinder in England Squash outfit, 2012

Personal information
- Born: 2 October 1935 Allahabad, India
- Died: 14 December 2023 (aged 88) Basingstoke, UK
- Height: 5.6 ft (171 cm)

Sport
- Country: United Kingdom
- Handedness: Squash
- Retired: Mar 2022
- Highest ranking: World No.1

Lance Kinder (2 October 1935 – 14 December 2023) was a British tennis player who took up veterans Squash in his 40s and rose to Number 1 in the world, winning many titles including the British Open and the World Masters. Kinder's record includes having played Squash 72 times for his country since 1992 and only losing once, winning World Championships and many global squash competitions – many of these after having a heart attack in his early 60s. Kinder gave much to the sport including holding the Vice-Presidency of the Veterans Squash Rackets Club of Great Britain since 2006. He was also the instigator for the creation of the British National Open and Closed tournament categories for the Over-60s, 65s, 70s, 75s and 80s age groups. Kinder died on 14 December 2023, at the age of 88.

== Playing career ==
Born 2 October 1935 in India (Allahabad) to British parents he returned home to the UK whilst still a young boy. Always attracted to sports Kinder made his school teams for Football and Cricket but it was whilst he was in the RAF that his sporting talents were identified. He went on to box for the RAF at Fly Weight.
After leaving the RAF, moving his career into tailoring and getting married, sport took back seat. In his 30s went back into sport with Badminton but it was in his early 40s Squash became the sport of choice. Combining training with playing 5–7 games of squash per week, his standard grew from club level, though regional to English national and world standard. He has played at national and international level in O55, O60, O65, O70, O75 and O80's categories.
Since his 40s Kinder has continuously played at the highest levels of squash, travelling the world to participate in and win many tournaments, including the British Open in 1992 (Over-55s) and in 2005 (Over-70s). Kinder was also a committed county player for Avon. He won 15 county titles in the over 45, 55, and 60 age groups. At the age of 58, in a single year, Kinder played for Avon county team in the over 35, 45 and 55 age groups.
Suffering a serious heart attack in his early 60s could have brought an abrupt end to his sporting life style. However, Kinder went back to Squash and re-established his position by competing in European and World Championships.
From the 1990s to the 2020s, Kinder was a member of the Veterans Squash Rackets Club of Great Britain winning 9 Singles and 22 Doubles titles in age categories from O55 to O80s. Indeed, Kinder and his long term playing partner John Woodliffe had such a successful partnership that the Veterans Squash Rackets Club of Great Britain renamed the 0ver 75 Doubles trophy "The Kinder/Woodliffe Cup".
Kinder finally retired from squash in the spring of 2022 following the competitive squash hiatus during the global Covid pandemic. Kinder continued to keep fit with squash training routines and pilates.

== Squash results ==
=== National ===
Kinder has represented England in Home International events playing against Scotland, Wales and Ireland since 1992. At the time of writing (July 2016) he played for his country in the O55, O60, O65, O70, O75 and O80 age groups on a total of 72 occasions and only lost once.

=== Singles ===
Date	Seeding	Event	Location	Round Reached
Nov 21	–	GB Vets O80	UK	Winner
Aug 18	–	World Masters Squash Championships O80	USA	Winner
Jun 18	–	British Open O80	Eng	Winner
Apr 17	–	GB Vets O80	Eng	Winner
Jun 16	–	British Open O80	Eng	Winner
Apr 16	–	GB Vets O80	Eng	Winner
Oct 15	–	European Masters Games	FRA	Winner
Feb 14	–	British O75 National Championship	ENG	Runner-up
May 13	[3/4]	British O75 Open	ENG	Semi-finals
Jul 12	[3/4]	World O75 Masters	ENG	Semi-finals
May 12	–	British O75 Open	ENG	Semi-finals
Feb 12	–	British O75 National Championship	ENG	Runner-up
Sep 11	[3/4]	European O70 Masters Championship	POR	Third place play-off
Jun 11	[2]	British O75 Open	ENG	Semi-finals
Feb 11	–	British O75 National Championship	ENG	Winner
Feb 10	[3/4]	British O70 National Championship	ENG	Semi-finals
Sep 09	[3/4]	British O70 Open	ENG	Semi-finals
2009	–	GB Vets O70	ENG	Winner
Feb 09	[3/4]	British O70 National Championship	ENG	Semi-finals
Oct 08	[3/4]	World O70 Masters	NZL	Semi-finals
May 8	[3/4]	British O70 Open	ENG	Semi-finals
Feb 08	[2]	British O70 National Championship	ENG	Semi-finals
Sep 07	[2]	British O70 Open	ENG	Runner-up
Feb 07	[3/4]	British O70 National Championship	ENG	Quarter-finals
Oct 06	[1]	World O70 Masters	RSA	Semi-finals
Sep 06	[2]	British O70 Open	ENG	Runner-up
2006	–	GB Vets O70	ENG	Winner
Feb 06	[1]	British O70 National Championship	ENG	Winner
Oct 05	[1]	British O70 Open	ENG	Winner
2005	[1]	World Masters Games O70	CAN	Winner
Feb 05	[5/8]	British O65 National Championship	ENG	Quarter-finals
2003	–	World O65 Masters	FIN	Quarter-finals
2001	–	World O65 Masters	AUS	Semi-finals
2001	–	GB Vets O65	ENG	Winner
1999	–	World O60 Masters	ENG	Semi-finals
1997	–	World O60 Masters	RSA	Quarter-finals
1996	–	GB Vets O60	ENG	Winner
1993	–	GB Vets O55	ENG	Winner
1992	–	British Open O50	ENG	Winner
1989	–	GB Vets O50	ENG	Winner
1988	–	GB Vets O50	ENG	Winner
1987	–	GB Vets O50	ENG	Winner
1986	–	GB Vets O50	ENG	Winner

=== Doubles ===
Date	Event	Partner	Round Reached
2018	GB Vets O75 Doubles	John Woodliffe	Winner
2017	GB Vets O75 Doubles	John Woodliffe	Winner
2013	GB Vets O70 Doubles	John Woodliffe	Winner
2012	GB Vets O75 Doubles	John Woodliffe	Winner
2011	GB Vets O70 Doubles	John Woodliffe	Winner
2010	GB Vets O70 Doubles	John Woodliffe	Winner
2009	GB Vets O70 Doubles	John Woodliffe	Winner
2008	GB Vets O70 Doubles	John Woodliffe	Winner
2007	GB Vets O70 Doubles	John Woodliffe	Winner
2006	GB Vets O70 Doubles	Ken Barrett	Winner
2006	GB Vets O65 Doubles	John Woodliffe	Winner
2005	GB Vets O65 Doubles	John Woodliffe	Winner
2004	GB Vets O65 Doubles	John Woodliffe	Winner
2003	GB Vets O65 Doubles	John Woodliffe	Winner
2002	GB Vets O65 Doubles	John Woodliffe	Winner
2002	GB Vets O55 Doubles	John Woodliffe	Winner
2000	GB Vets O55 Doubles	John Woodliffe	Winner
1999	GB Vets O55 Doubles	John Woodliffe	Winner
1999	World Champion O55		Winner
1998	GB Vets O55 Doubles	John Woodliffe	Winner
1997	GB Vets O55 Doubles	John Woodliffe	Winner
1995	GB Vets O55 Doubles	John Woodliffe	Winner
1993	GB Vets O55 Doubles	John Woodliffe	Winner
1992	GB Vets O55 Doubles	John Woodliffe	Winner

== Awards and recognition ==
Hampshire and Isle of Wight Sportsman of the Year – 2005
Basingstoke Senior & Veteran Award – 2005
Interview on BBC Sport – 7 Mar 2016
Interview on the BBC Breakfast Show – 5 Sep 2020
