= 2000 European Squash Team Championships =

Squash tournament

- 28th
- Location: (Austria) Vienna
- Date: 26 – 29 April 2000
- Website europeansquash.com

Results
- Champions: Men England; Women England

The 2000 European Squash Team Championships was the 28th edition of European Squash Team Championships for squash players. The event was held in Vienna, Austria, from 26 to 29 April 2000. The tournament was organised by the European Squash Federation.

The England men's team won their 25th title and the England women's team won their 23rd title.

== Men's tournament ==
=== Group stage ===
Group A

Pos	Team	P	W	D	L	Pts
1	England	4	4	0	0	8
2	France	4	3	0	1	6
3	Germany	4	2	0	2	4
4	Austria	4	1	0	3	2
5	Belgium	4	0	0	4	0

Group B

Pos	Team	P	W	D	L	Pts
1	Finland	4	3	1	0	7
2	Wales	4	3	0	1	6
3	Netherlands	4	1	1	2	3
4	Switzerland	4	0	2	2	2
5	Sweden	4	0	2	2	2

=== Semi-finals ===
England
3
Semi-final 1

Wales
1

		1	2	3	4	5
1	(England) (Wales)
2	(England) (Wales)
3	(England) (Wales)
4	(England) (Wales)

France
4
Semi-final 2

Finland
0

			1	2	3	4	5
1	(France) (Finland)	Thierry Lincou; Olli Tuominen	9; 4	5; 9	9; 2	9; 1
2	(France) (Finland)	Gregory Gaultier; Janne Kyttänen	9; 5	9; 3	9; 7
3	(France) (Finland)	Renan Lavigne; Juha Raumolin	7; 9	10; 8	9; 0
4	(France) (Finland)	Jean Michel Arcucci; Timo Tuominen	9; 5	9; 3	9; 6

=== Third place ===
Finland
3
Third place

Wales
1

			1	2	3	4	5
1	(Finland) (Wales)	Olli Tuominen; David Evans	9; 3	9; 3	9; 4
2	(Finland) (Wales)	Juha Raumolin; Alex Gough	9; 4	9; 7	9; 0
3	(Finland) (Wales)	Timo Tuominen; Greg Tippings	9; 7	2; 9	4; 9	4; 9
4	(Finland) (Wales)	Janne Kyttanen; Gavin Jones	7; 9	9; 6	9; 3	9; 3

=== Final ===
England
4
Final

France
0

			1	2	3	4	5
1	(England) (France)	Simon Parke; Thierry Lincou	9; 6	9; 1	3; 9	9; 3
2	(England) (France)	Paul Johnson; Renan Lavigne	9; 2	9; 0
3	(England) (France)	Del Harris; Jean Michel Arcucci	9; 6	9; 1	9; 1
4	(England) (France)	Mark Chaloner; Gregory Gaultier	9; 6	9; 6	9; 5

== Women's tournament ==
=== Group stage ===
Group A

Pos	Team	P	W	L	Pts
1	England	4	4	0	8
2	Scotland	4	3	1	6
3	Switzerland	4	2	2	4
4	Denmark	4	1	3	2
5	Wales	4	0	4	0

Group B

Pos	Team	P	W	L	Pts
1	Germany	4	4	0	8
2	Netherlands	4	3	1	6
3	Spain	4	2	2	4
4	Belgium	4	1	3	2
5	France	4	0	4	0

=== Semi-finals ===
England
3
Semi-final 1

Netherlands
0

			1	2	3	4	5
1	(England) (Netherlands)	Cassie Campion; Vanessa Atkinson	9; 0	9; 7	9; 0
2	(England) (Netherlands)	Linda Charman; Daphne Jelgersma	9; 6	9; 1	9; 0
3	(England) (Netherlands)	Tania Bailey; Bea Dreu-Spits	9; 0	9; 1	9; 1

Germany
2
Semi-final 2

Scotland
1

			1	2	3	4	5
1	(Germany) (Scotland)	Sabine Schöne; Pamela Nimmo	9; 4	9; 2	9; 4
2	(Germany) (Scotland)	Sabine Baum; Senga Macfie	7; 9	0; 9
3	(Germany) (Scotland)	Daniela Grzenia; Claire Waddell	0; 9	9; 5	9; 1	5; 9	9; 6

=== Third place ===
Scotland
2
Third place

Netherlands
1

			1	2	3	4	5
1	(Scotland) (Netherlands)	Pamela Nimmo; Vanessa Atkinson	5; 9	5; 9	3; 9
2	(Scotland) (Netherlands)	Senga Macfie; Daphne Jelgersma	9; 4	9; 2	9; 0
3	(Scotland) (Netherlands)	Claire Waddell; Bea Dreu-Spitse	9; 0	9; 0	9; 1

=== Final ===
England
3
Final

Germany
0

			1	2	3	4	5
1	(England) (Germany)	Cassie Campion; Sabine Schöne	9; 1	9; 4	9; 3
2	(England) (Germany)	Linda Charman; Sabine Baum	7; 9	0; 9
3	(England) (Germany)	Stephanie Brind; Danielle Grzenia	9; 4	9; 6	9; 2
