= Peter Wright (squash player) =

Australian squash player

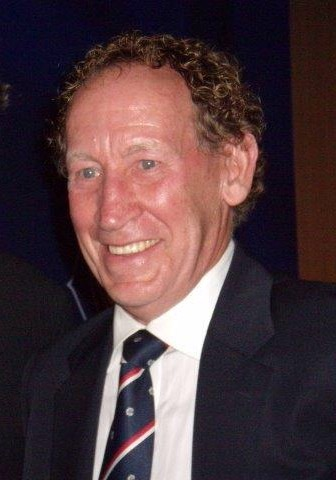
- World Masters Squash Champion and Administrator

Personal information
- Nationality: Australian
- Citizenship: Australian
- Born: 11 March 1943 (age 83) Sunshine, Victoria, Australia
- Occupation: sports administrator
- Life partner: Irene Taylor
- Squash

Sport
- Club: Melbourne Cricket Club
- Team: Squash Team
- Retired: 30 December 2012

Achievements and titles
- World finals: World Masters Champion (3 times); World Masters Runner up – (4 times)
- National finals: Australian Champion; New Zealand Champion; Victorian Champion

Peter David William Wright (born 11 March 1943) is an Australian born Squash Champion, sports administrator, and entrepreneur.

Wright won the World Masters Squash Championships three times. In addition, he has been Australian, New Zealand and Victorian Masters Squash Champion.

Described as an "outstanding administrator", he was Tournament Director for the 1995 and 2001 World Masters Squash Championships held in Melbourne, and, inter alia, for the Australian Masters Squash Association and the Victorian Masters Squash Association.

== Early life ==
Wright was born in Sunshine, Victoria on 11 March 1943 in the middle of World War II. His father, David Stanley Wright was a munitions worker and his mother was Lorna Edna Wright (née Martin). His lifetime sports career began in his home suburb of Sunshine where he played in many junior competitive sports. At 15 he joined the Sunshine Park Tennis Club and sometime before 1962 the Sunshine Squash Club. Wright suffered from asthma when he was young, but his asthma went away when he began playing squash.

Kerville states that Wright has always believed deeply in the benefits of sport for every human being. Wright further believes that all persons, including lower grades and "oldies", particularly benefit from the competitive and social side of squash and any kind of sport.

== Sporting career ==
Peter Wright has been three times World Masters Squash Champion. His victories were in 1985 in Toronto, Canada, in 1993 in the over 50s division in Edinburgh, Scotland, and in 1999 in the over 55 division Sheffield, England. He was runner-up in 1989 in Aarhus in Denmark, in 1994 in Brisbane, Australia, in 1995 and 2001 in Melbourne, Australia.

- Australian Masters Squash Champion five times.
- Australian Masters Games Squash Champion four times.
- New Zealand Masters Squash Champion five times
- Victorian Masters Squash Champion six times.
- Represented Australia twelve times in World Master’s Team events.

== Career as an administrator ==
For 34 years (1986–2020) he has been –

- President of the Australian Masters Squash Association
- Tournament Director for the 1995 and 2001 World Masters Squash Championships held in Melbourne
- Member of the World Squash Federation Masters Committee for 10 years.
- Executive Committee Member for Squash for the 2006 Commonwealth Games held in Melbourne.
- Tournament Director of the Australian Masters Squash Association and the Victorian Masters Squash Association for 9 years (1983–1992)
- Tournament Director of the Melbourne Cricket Club Squash Club for 15 years. In his 32 years as a member of the squash section, Peter has played 668 competition matches.

== Honours ==
He has engaged in many other significant administrative roles for which he received

- The Medal of the Order of Australia (OAM) for services to the sport of squash and for a range of executive roles.
- Hans Ebeling Award winner of the Melbourne Cricket Club.
- Life Member of Melbourne Cricket Club Squash section (2006).
- Life Member 1998: Australian Masters Squash Association.
- Legend Status at the Melbourne Cricket Club Squash Section and the Award for outstanding club person of the year.
