= Craig van der Wath =

South African squash player (born 1966)

Craig Van der Wath
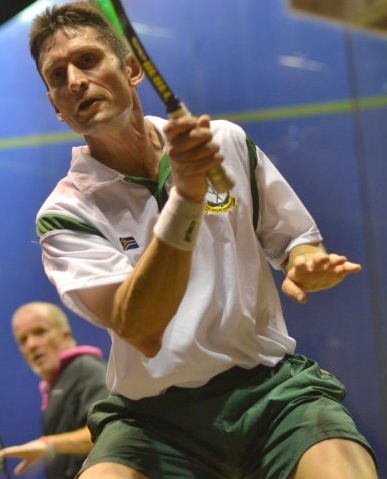
- Craig van der Wath in 2015

Personal information
- Born: 28 June 1966 (age 60) South Africa

Sport
- Country: South Africa

Men's singles
- Highest ranking: No. 21 (March 1998)
- Updated on February, 2018

Craig Van der Wath (born 28 June 1966 in Bloemfontein) is a South African former professional squash player. He reached a career high ranking of number 21 in the world. He represented his country in the Commonwealth Games. He has won the World Masters Squash Championships a record 6 times.
