= Stuart Cowie =

Scottish squash player (born 1974)

Personal information
- Nationality: British (English/Scottish)
- Born: 22 November 1974 (age 51) Croydon, England

Sport
- Sport: Squash
Medal record
Representing Scotland
Men's squash
Commonwealth Games
Bronze medal – third place	1998 Kuala Lumpur	Doubles
National Championships
Gold medal – first place	1996	singles

Stuart Robert Cowie (born 22 November 1974) is an English-born former professional squash player who represented Scotland at the Commonwealth Games.

== Biography ==
As a junior Cowie played for England and was ranked the number one U19 player in England and Europe. His mother Alex Cowie was the England women's team manager.

He switched allegiance and made his senior debut for Scotland at the European Championships in April 1995. He was able to play for Scotland because he had a father from Aberdeen. Cowie won the Scottish national squash title in 1996.

Cowie represented the 1998 Scottish team at the 1998 Commonwealth Games in Kuala Lumpur, Malaysia, where he competed in three events. He won a bronze medal in the men's doubles partnering Peter Nicol.
