= Jean Grainger =

Irish historical fiction author

- Born: 1971
- Education: University College Cork
- Occupation: Novelist
- Notable work: The Tour; If Walls Could Talk
- Website: Official website

Jean Grainger (born 1971) is an Irish novelist from County Cork. Her debut novel, The Tour, appeared in 2013. Much of her later work is historical fiction, and her books have found a readership in the United States, particularly among Irish Americans.

== Early life ==
In her twenties, she wrote and directed plays for young people. She worked as a tour guide before attending college. She studied English and history at University College Cork and taught English at De La Salle College in Macroom. She also undertook doctoral research on Irish women during the Second World War, which she did not complete.

== Career ==
Grainger drew on her work as a guide for The Tour, in which the fictional guide Conor O’Shea takes a group of Americans through Clare, West Cork and Kerry. The book became the first in a six-volume series. Reviewing the debut for The Southern Star, Catherine Ketch praised its storyline, dialogue and humour.

For her doctoral research, Grainger had interviewed Irish women who joined the British forces during the Second World War. She used those interviews in her second novel, So Much Owed. Other novels are set during the First World War and the Irish War of Independence. Her Kilteegan Bridge novel When Irish Eyes Are Lying (2023) follows two cousins from Ireland who seek a new life in 1970s California.

In If Walls Could Talk (2026), the first book in her Dunmara series, the lives of three women in the present are interwoven with that of a young American who came to Dunmara House in the 1960s, when it was a home for unmarried mothers. Reviewing the novel for Historical Novels Review, Samantha Ward-Smith praised its characterisation and humour, but found the antagonists stereotyped and the central mystery predictable. The second book, The Rector’s Daughter, follows two people who live a century apart.

By 2022, Grainger had published 31 novels, including mysteries and contemporary fiction. By July 2026, her catalogue comprised 50 books; her novels had appeared on the USA Today bestseller list and US readers accounted for most of her online reviews. The newspaper also reported that her books had been translated into German.

Grainger published The Tour in 2026.
