= Charlotte Delsinne =

French squash player (born 1986)

Personal information
- Born: 18 June 1986 (age 40) Lille, France

Sport
- Country: France
- Handedness: Left Handed
- Racquet used: Oliver

Women's singles
- Highest ranking: No. 89 (April 2007)
- Current ranking: No. 89 (April 2007)
- Updated on February, 2018

Charlotte Delsinne (born 18 June 1986 in Lille) is a French professional squash player. As of April 2007, she was ranked number 89 in the world.
