= Glen Wilson (squash player) =

New Zealand squash player and coach

Personal information
- Nickname: Unit
- Born: 26 March 1971 (age 55) Upper Hutt

Sport
- Country: New Zealand

Men's Singles
- Highest ranking: 24
Medal record
Men's squash
Representing New Zealand
World Doubles Championships
Silver medal – second place	2004 Chennai	Mixed doubles
Commonwealth Games
Gold medal – first place	2002 Manchester	Mixed doubles
Bronze medal – third place	1998 Kuala Lumpur	Mixed doubles
- Updated on 12 April 2022

Glen Wilson (born 26 March 1971 in Upper Hutt, New Zealand) is a New Zealand squash coach and former professional player.

As a player, Wilson was a three-time New Zealand national champion, and reached a career-high ranking of World No. 24.

He won a mixed doubles bronze medal at the 1998 Commonwealth Games (partnering Sarah Cook), a mixed doubles gold medal at the 2002 Commonwealth Games (partnering Leilani Joyce), and a mixed doubles silver medal at the 2004 World Doubles Squash Championships (partnering Shelley Kitchen).

2021 - 2025 Head coach at Howick Squash Club in Auckland.

2022 Head Coach for NZ Squash team at Birmingham Commonwealth Games. The team one 3 Gold Medals.

2022 Inducted into NZ Squash Hall of Fame

2025 - Head Squash Professional at Cincinnati Squash Academy

Of Māori descent, Wilson affiliates to the Waikato iwi, based in Waikato Region, in New Zealand's North Island.
