= Amanda Hopps =

Australian squash player (born 1970)

Personal information
- Born: 9 March 1970 (age 56) Zambia
- Height: 164 cm (5 ft 5 in)
- Weight: 61 kg (134 lb)

Sport
- Country: Australia

Women's singles
- Highest ranking: No. 57 (March 2006)
- Updated on February, 2018

Amanda Hopps (born 9 March 1970 in Zambia) is an Australian former professional squash player. She reached a career high ranking of number 57 in the world. She has represented Australia as a junior and senior player. She has won the World Masters Squash Championships twice in 2008 (O/35) and 2014 (O/40).
