= Jade Wilson =

New Zealand squash player

Personal information
- Born: 1977 Wellington, New Zealand
- Died: 14 May 1998 (aged 20–21) Perth, Australia

Sport
- Coached by: Tony Naughton, Rob Walker, Barrie Matthews

women's singles
- Highest ranking: 18

Jade Wilson (1977 – 14 May 1998) was a New Zealand squash player representing the national team mainly in junior-level competitions. Jade Wilson is still remembered as one of the greatest ever junior squash players to have emerged from New Zealand and to have represented the country at junior level along with Stuart Davenport, Susan Devoy and Glen Wilson. She won the 1995 World Junior Squash Championships individual event in Sydney, which was her highest career performance. With this triumph, she also became the first ever New Zealander to win a Junior Squash Championship singles title. On 14 May 1998, she committed suicide in Perth after becoming an international professional player.

In 2013, Squash New Zealand recognised Wilson's achievements and inducted her into the New Zealand Squash Hall of Fame, 15 years after her death.

== Early life ==
Wilson was born in 1977 and was raised in Wellington. She attended Wellington Girls' College.

She started playing squash at the Tawa Club and was coached by Tony Naughton, who was her first coach. She also played squash in Mana Club and was coached by Rob Walker. She also hired Palmerston North based coach Barrie Matthews who later inspired her to win the Junior world title in 1995.

== Career ==
Wilson emerged at the international level for the first time at the age of 16, during the 1993 World Junior Squash Championships reaching semi-finals in the individual category and was part of the New Zealand squad which became runners-up to Australia at the team event.

At the 1995 World Junior Squash Championships, she made history by winning the women's individual title in Sydney defeating favourite Australia's Rachel Grinham in the finals to secure her maiden title. After winning the 1995 Junior World title, she became the first and only player from New Zealand to become a Junior Squash World Champion. Despite her achievement, New Zealand failed to reach the final in the women's team event and had a third-place finish at the 1995 World Junior Squash Championships. She was named the Manawatu sportsperson of the year in 1995 for her memorable achievement of winning the 1995 Junior World title.

Besides the World Junior title, Wilson also emerged victorious at the 1995 British Junior Open Squash in the U19 category.

She became a professional squash player in 1997 by achieving her highest ever career rating of 18.

== Death ==
Jade Wilson committed suicide on 14 May 1998 when she was 21 years old.
