= Donna Vardy =

English squash player (born 1971)

Personal information
- Born: 16 April 1971 (age 55) Mansfield, England

Sport
- Country: England

Women's singles
- Highest ranking: No. 20 (August 1987)
Medal record
Women's squash
Representing England
European Team Championships
Gold medal – first place	1990 Zurich	Team

Donna Vardy (born 16 April 1971) is an English former professional squash player. She reached a career high ranking of 20 in the world during August 1987.

== Biography ==
Donna was born in Mansfield, England and won the British Under-19 Open title three times from 1987 to 1989. She represented Nottinghamshire at county level and reached the top ten in the English national rankings and top sixteen in the world rankings. She competed in the British Open Squash Championships throughout the late 1980s and early 1990s and led England to victory in the 1987 World Junior Championships.

Vardy won a gold medal for the England women's national squash team at the European Squash Team Championships in 1990.
