= The Petersens =

Country-bluegrass band from Missouri

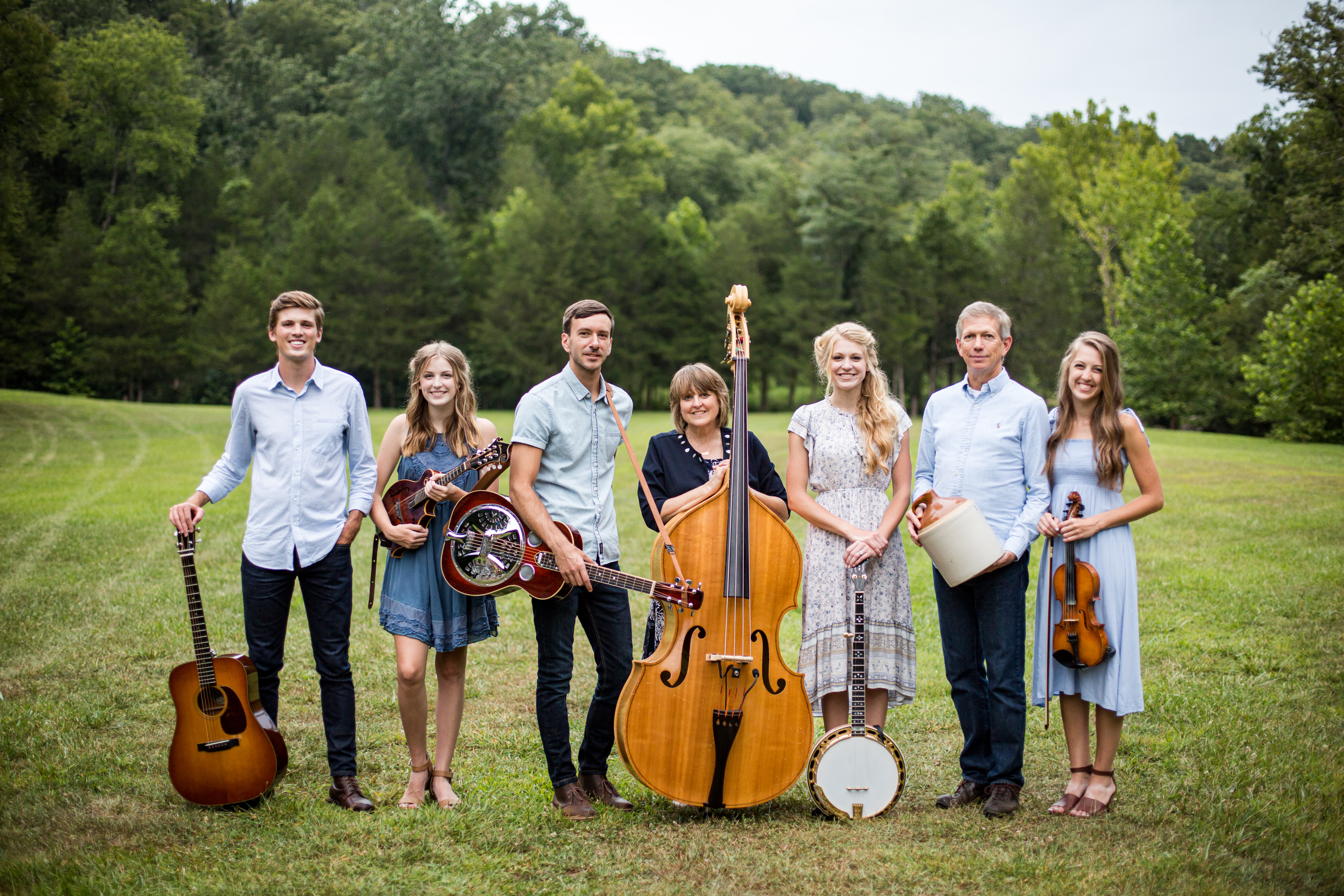
- The Petersens in 2020. From left to right: Matthew, Julianne, Emmett, Karen, Ellen, Jon, and Katie

Background information
- Origin: Branson, Missouri, United States
- Genres: Bluegrass; Country; Christian; Gospel; Roots
- Years active: 2005–present
- Members: Katie Petersen; Ellen Petersen Haygood; Matt Petersen; Julianne Petersen; Karen Petersen; Emmett Franz; Jon Petersen
- Website: www.petersenband.com

The Petersens are an American family band from Branson, Missouri. They perform bluegrass, country, and Christian music, along with mainstream musical covers.

== Members ==
The band consists of siblings and family friends:

- Katie Petersen – fiddle
- Ellen Petersen Haygood – banjo
- Matt Petersen – guitar
- Julianne Petersen – mandolin
- Karen Petersen – double bass
- Emmett Franz – dobro
- Jon Petersen – piano

== Band history ==
The Petersens began performing in 2005 at the First Christian Church of Mountain Grove, Missouri. They soon expanded to performing at local festivals, churches, and cafés. On September 5, 2010, they won the CAM Gospel Sing-Off at the Sight & Sound Theatre in Branson.

In 2015, banjo player Ellen Petersen competed on Season 14 of American Idol, reaching the Top 48.

== Touring ==
The Petersens have toured across the United States, Canada, and Europe. In 2019, they toured Ireland, the United Kingdom, and Finland.

In March 2025, the band toured New Zealand, performing in locations such as Whangārei, Kerikeri and Thames.

== Discography ==
=== Albums and EPs ===
| Title | Release date | Label |
|---|---|---|
| Travelin’ Shoes - The Petersen Family Band (EP) | — | — |
| Finally Going Home - The Petersens | May 1, 2014 | — |
| Shenandoah - The Petersens | October 22, 2017 | — |
| Homesick for a Country | August 9, 2019 | The Petersens |
| Gentle on My Mind - The Petersens (EP) | November 1, 2019 | — |
| Live Sessions, Vol. 01 | August 8, 2020 | — |
| Live Sessions, Vol. 02 | October 20, 2020 | — |
| Christmas with the Petersens | November 6, 2020 | — |
| Live Sessions, Vol. 03 | September 15, 2021 | — |
| Live Sessions, Vol. 04 | November 19, 2021 | — |
| My Ozark Mountain Home | November 18, 2022 | — |
| We Don’t Need Anything This Year | November 10, 2023 | — |
| The Greenest Grass (EP) | August 9, 2024 | — |
| Live Sessions, Vol. 05 | October 10, 2025 | — |
| Live Sessions, Vol. 06 | October 24, 2025 | — |
| Father, A Moment With You | May 8, 2026 | — |
| Live Sessions, Vol. 07 | August 21, 2026 | — |
