= Sarah Cook (squash player) =

New Zealand squash player (born 1975)

Personal information
- Full name: Sarah Jane Cook
- Born: 13 February 1975 (age 51)

Sport
- Country: New Zealand
- Retired: 1998

Women's Singles
- Highest ranking: 22 (November 1995)
Medal record
Women's squash
Representing New Zealand
Commonwealth Games
| Bronze medal – third place | 1998 Kuala Lumpur | Mixed doubles |
- Updated on 20 December 2011

Sarah Jane Cook (born 13 February 1975) is a New Zealand former squash player. She reached a highest ranking of World No. 22 in November 1995. She won a bronze medal in the mixed doubles at the 1998 Commonwealth Games, partnering Glen Wilson.
