= Robyn Cooper =

Australian squash player (born 1972)

Personal information
- Born: 16 January 1972 (age 54)

Sport
- Country: Australia
- Highest ranking: 12 (1996)
Medal record
Women's squash
Representing Australia
World Team Championships
Gold medal – first place	2002 Odense	Team
Silver medal – second place	2000 Sheffield	Team
World Doubles Championships
Silver medal – second place	2006 Melbourne	Doubles
Commonwealth Games
Silver medal – second place	1998 Kuala Lumpur	Doubles
Bronze medal – third place	2002 Manchester	Mixed doubles
- Updated on 12 April 2022

Robyn Cooper (born 16 January 1972) is an Australian former professional squash player. She reached a career-high world ranking of World No. 12 in 1996. At the 1998 Commonwealth Games, she won a Silver Medal in the women's doubles, partnering Rachael Grinham.

Cooper represented Australia at the 2000 Women's World Team Squash Championships in Sheffield, England winning a silver medal and two years later she won the gold medal with Australia at the 2002 Women's World Team Squash Championships in Odense, Denmark.

At the 2002 Commonwealth Games, Cooper won a Bronze Medal in the mixed doubles, partnering Joe Kneipp. She also finished runner-up in the women's doubles at the 2006 World Doubles Squash Championships, partnering Sarah Fitz-Gerald.
