= Maha Zein =

Egyptian squash player (born 1976)

Personal information
- Born: 2 May 1976 (age 50) Cairo, Egypt
- Years active: 1993–2003

Sport
- Country: Egypt
- Turned pro: 1993
- Highest ranking: 79 (November 2000)

Maha Zein (born 2 May 1976) is a former Egyptian professional squash player who is currently a squash coach. She represented the Egypt national women's squash team in several international competitions, including the British Open Squash Championships, World Open Squash Championships and in World Team Squash Championships in a career spanning from 1993 to 2003. She achieved her highest career PSA ranking of 19 in November 2000 as a part of the 2000 PSA World Tour.

== Career ==
She joined the Professional Squash Association in 1993 and competed at the PSA World Tour until 2003. She was part of the Women's Squash Association and played in WSA World Tour until 2003. She emerged in the sport from youth level and appeared as one of the marquee players of the first Egyptian team which took part in a World Junior Squash Championships event for the first time in 1993.

She was part of the Egyptian squad at the World Team Squash Championships in 1996, 1998, 2000 and in 2002. Maha also represented Egypt at the 1997 World Games, her only appearance at the World Summer Games.

Her best performance came at the Malaysian Open Squash Championships in 2000 where she emerged as runner-up to England's Stephanie Brind. After her retirement in 2003, she went onto become a coach at Bay Club Squash.
