= Pamela Nimmo =

Scottish squash player (born 1977)

Personal information
- Nationality: British (Scottish)
- Born: 23 August 1977 (age 49) Edinburgh, Scotland

Sport
- Handedness: Right Handed
- Turned pro: 1998
- Racquet used: Head

Women's singles
- Highest ranking: No. 14 (October 2002)
Medal record
Representing Scotland
European Team Championships
| Bronze medal – third place | 2000 Vienna | team |
| Silver medal – second place | 2002 Böblingen | team |
| Bronze medal – third place | 2003 Nottingham | team |
National Championships
| Gold medal – first place | 1998–2000, 2004–05 | singles |

Pamela Nimmo (born 23 August 1977) is a former professional squash player who represented Scotland. She reached a career-high world ranking of World No. 14 in October 2002.

== Biography ==
Nimmo represented the 2002 Scottish team at the 2002 Commonwealth Games in Manchester, England, where she competed in the squash events and reached the last 16 of the singles.

Nimmo won one silver medal and two bronze medals at the European Team Championships in 2000 in Vienna, in 2002 in Böblingen and 2003 in Nottingham.

Nimmo also won five national titles at the Scottish National Squash Championships from 1998 to 2000 and from 2004 to 2005.
