= Jenny Tranfield =

English squash player (born 1975)

Personal information
- Born: 31 March 1975 (age 51) Sheffield, England

Sport
- Country: England
- Handedness: Right Handed
- Turned pro: 1996
- Coached by: Sue Wright
- Retired: 2005
- Racquet used: Oliver

Women's singles
- Highest ranking: No. 8 (January 2005)
- Title: 10
- Tour final: 13
Medal record
Women's squash
Representing England
European Team Championships
| Gold medal – first place | 2003 Nottingham | Team |

Jennifer Karen Tranfield (born 31 March 1975) is a retired professional squash player who represented England. She reached a career PSA high ranking of 8 in the world during January 2005.

== Biography ==
Tranfield won a gold medal for the England women's national squash team at the 2003 European Squash Team Championships in Nottingham.
