= 1972 Men's British Open Squash Championship =

British Open Squash Championships
- 34th British Open Championships

Details
- Location: Sheffield, England
- Venue: Abbeydale Park

The 1972 Benson and Hedges British Open Championship was held at the Abbeydale Park Squash Club in Sheffield from 28 January – 5 February 1972.
Jonah Barrington won his fifth title defeating Geoff Hunt in the final. The event was sponsored for the first time by Benson and Hedges.

== Seeds ==
1. (Republic of Ireland) Jonah Barrington
2. (Australia) Geoff Hunt
3. (Australia) Ken Hiscoe
4. (Pakistan) Gogi Alauddin
5. (Pakistan) Aftab Jawaid
6. (Egypt) Mohamed Asran
7. (Pakistan) Hiddy Jahan
8. (Pakistan) Mohamed Yasin (withdrew)

== Draw and results ==
=== First round ===
Player One	Player Two	Score
(Republic of Ireland) Jonah Barrington	(Egypt) Ahmed Nadi	9-3 9-0 9-1
(England) Mike de Semlyen	(England) D P Morgan	9-2 9-5 9-3
(Australia) Ray Lewis	(England) Don Innes	w/o
(South Africa) Dave Dick	(India) Hisamud Din	9-2 9-4 9-5
(Egypt) Galal Allam	(Canada) Sharif Khan	w/o
(England) Ian Nuttall	(India) Aly Aspahani	w/o
(England) Tony Swift	(Australia) Rob Jolly	9-3 9-6 9-6
(England) M G Young	(England) Alan Sims	9-5 6-9 9-5 10-8
(Pakistan) Gogi Alauddin	(Rhodesia) Mike Hepker	9-3 4-9 6-9 9-2 9-2
(England) David D’Arcy Hughes	(Egypt) Ahmed Safwat	9-1 9-3 9-4
(England) Terry Pickering	(England) John Palmer	9-4 9-4 9-4
(Canada) Ken Binns	(Egypt) Maged Abaza	9-7 8-9 9-5 9-5
(Pakistan) Aftab Jawaid	(Egypt) Moussa Helal	9-7 9- 0 9-5
(England) John Easter	(Pakistan) Rehmatullah Khan	9-7 9-4 9-1
(England) Paul Millman	(South Africa) Mike Nathanson	w/o
(Pakistan) Mohibullah Khan	(Pakistan) Amanullah Khan	10-8 9-4 9-0
(Australia) Geoff Hunt	(Pakistan) Yusuf Khan	9-0 9-2 9-2
(England) Mike Corby	(South Africa) Alan Colburn	9-3 10-8 8-10 9-7
(Pakistan) Sajjad Muneer	(Scotland) Kim Bruce-Lockhart	9-4 9-5 10-9
(England) Ian Turley	(England) Brian Wise	9-5 9-2 9-6
(Pakistan) Hiddy Jahan	(England) Tony Gathercole	9-6 9-3 9-2
(England) Robin Bawtree	(Egypt) K Mahmoud	9-4 9-10 9-4 9-3
(Egypt) Abdelfattah Abou Taleb	(Egypt) Samir Nadim	w/o
(England) Pat Kirton	(Egypt) M A Mohsen	9-4 9-1 9-5
(Australia) Ken Hiscoe	(England) Ken Davidson	9-0 9-1 9-1
(Egypt) Mohamed Khalifa	(England) Charles Booth	9-1 9-5 9-5
(United States) Mohibullah ‘Mo’ Khan	(Egypt) M Youssef	9-0 9-4 9-1
(England) Clive Francis	(England) Mike Grundy	9-6 9-3 10-8
(Egypt) Mohamed Asran	(India) Abdul Rashid	9-0 9-2 9-1
(Netherlands) Robert Anjema	(Pakistan) Khan Din	10-8 9-5 9-4
(England) Philip Ayton	(England) John Richardson	9-3 9-2 8-10 9-10 10-8
(Wales) Peter Stokes	(England) Alan Purnell	9-2 5-9 9-3 9-6

=== Second round ===
Player One	Player Two	Score
(Republic of Ireland) Jonah Barrington	(England) Mike de Semlyen	9-2 9-1 9-3
(Australia) Ray Lewis	(South Africa) Dave Dick	9-6 9-4 9-4
(Egypt) Galal Allam	(England) Ian Nuttall	9-7 9-1 9-7
(England) Tony Swift	(England) M G Young	9-6 7-9 9-2 9-4
(Pakistan) Gogi Alauddin	(England) David D’Arcy Hughes	9-2 9-2 10-9
(England) Terry Pickering	(Canada) Ken Binns	5-9 9-1 9-1 9-1
(Pakistan) Aftab Jawaid	(England) John Easter	4-9 9-3 9-7 10-9
(England) Paul Millman	(Pakistan) Mohibullah Khan	9-1 9-7 9-6
(Australia) Geoff Hunt	(England) Mike Corby	8-10 9-3 9-3 9-7
(Pakistan) Sajjad Muneer	(England) Ian Turley	9-1 9-2 9-6
(Pakistan) Hiddy Jahan	(England) Robin Bawtree	9-5 9-7 9-3
(Egypt) Abdelfattah Abou Taleb	(England) Pat Kirton	9-7 9-3 0-9 4-9 9-7
(Australia) Ken Hiscoe	(Egypt) Mohamed Khalifa	9-1 9-4 9-5
(United States) Mohibullah ‘Mo’ Khan	(England) Clive Francis	9-5 9-3 9-3
(Egypt) Mohamed Asran	(Netherlands) Robert Anjema	9-5 9-0 9-2
(England) Philip Ayton	(Wales) Peter Stokes	9-1 9-3 9-7

=== Main draw ===
Third round
1	(Republic of Ireland) Jonah Barrington	9	9	9
(Australia) Ray Lewis	4	0	5
(Egypt) Galal Allam	9	9	9
(England) Tony Swift	7	7	5
4	(Pakistan) Gogi Alauddin	9	10	9
(England) Terry Pickering	0	5	0
5	(Pakistan) Aftab Jawaid	9	9	9
(England) Paul Millman	5	7	5
2	(Australia) Geoff Hunt	9	9	9
(Pakistan) Sajjad Muneer	1	7	1
7	(Pakistan) Hiddy Jahan	9	9	9
(Egypt) Abdelfattah Abou Taleb	7	5	2
3	(Australia) Ken Hiscoe	9	9	9
(United States) Mo Khan	3	1	5
6	(Egypt) Mohamed Asran	9	9	2	9
(England) Philip Ayton	4	4	9	6

Quarter-finals
1	(Republic of Ireland) Barrington	9	9	9
(Egypt) Allam	6	3	7
4	(Pakistan) Alauddin	9	9	9
5	(Pakistan) Jawaid	5	4	4
2	(Australia) Hunt	9	10	9	10
7	(Pakistan) Jahan	7	9	10	1
3	(Australia) Hiscoe	9	3	9	9
6	(Egypt) Asran	6	9	6	3

Semi-finals
1	(Republic of Ireland) Barrington	10	9	9
4	(Pakistan) Alauddin	8	7	2
2	(Australia) Hunt	9	10	9
3	(Australia) Hiscoe	7	9	4

Final
1	(Republic of Ireland) Barrington	0	9	10	6	9
2	(Australia) Hunt	9	7	8	9	7

Eighth seed Mohamed Yasin (Pakistan) withdrew before the tournament started.

Preceded by 1971	British Open Squash Championships; England (London); 1972	Succeeded by 1973
