= Great Britain men's national squash team =

Great Britain

World Team Championships
- First year: 1967
- Titles: 2 (1976-1979)
- Runners-up: 4
- Best finish: 1st
- Entries: 7

The Great Britain men's national squash team represented Great Britain in international squash team competitions between 1967 and 1979.

Great Britain won two World Squash Team Open titles.

== Results ==
=== World Team Squash Championships ===
Year	Result	Position	W	L	Teams
(Australia) Melbourne 1967	Group Stage	2nd	3	2	Jonah Barrington, David Brazier, Mike Corby, Peter Stokes
(England) Birmingham 1969	Group Stage	2nd	4	1	Jonah Barrington, Mike Corby, Don Innes, Paul Millman
(New Zealand) Palmerston North 1971	Group Stage	2nd	4	2	Philip Ayton, Mike Corby, John Easter, Paul Millman
(South Africa) Johannesburg 1973	Group Stage	2nd	3	1	Philip Ayton, Stuart Courtney, John Easter, Bryan Patterson
(England) Birmingham 1976	Champions	1st	6	0	Philip Ayton, Stuart Courtney, Jonathan Leslie, Ian Robinson
(Canada) Toronto 1977	Semi Final	4th	4	3	Jonathan Leslie, Barry O'Connor, Ian Robinson, John Richardson
(Australia) Brisbane 1979	Champions	1st	8	0	Andrew Dwyer, Phil Kenyon, Jonathan Leslie, Peter Verow
Total	7/7	2 Titles	32	9	

== See also ==
- Great Britain women's national squash team
- England men's national squash team
- England women's national squash team
- British National Squash Championships
