= 1969 Men's British Open Squash Championship =

British Open Squash Championships
- 31st British Open Championships

Details
- Location: Sheffield, England
- Venue: Abbeydale Park

The 1969 British Open Championship was held at the Abbeydale Park in Sheffield from 21–29 January 1969.
Geoff Hunt won the title defeating Cameron Nancarrow in the final. This was the first time that the event took place outside London. Returning after a seven-year absence the 1962 semi-finalist Dardir El Bakary represented New Zealand instead of Egypt.

== Seeds ==
1. (Republic of Ireland) Jonah Barrington
2. (Australia) Geoff Hunt
3. (United Arab Republic) Abdelfattah Abou Taleb
4. (Australia) Ken Hiscoe
5. (Australia) Cam Nancarrow
6. (Australia) Dick Carter
7. (England) Mike Corby
8. (United Arab Republic) Tewfik Shafik

== Draw and results ==
=== Semi-finals & Final ===
Semi-finals
1	(England) (Republic of Ireland) Jonah Barrington	4	5	8
5	(Australia) Cameron Nancarrow	9	9	10
2	(Australia) Geoff Hunt	9	9	9
3	(United Arab Republic) Abdelfattah Abou Taleb	5	2	5

Final
5	(Australia) Cameron Nancarrow	4	5	0
2	(Australia) Geoff Hunt	9	9	9

=== Section 1 ===
First Round
1	(England) (Republic of Ireland) Jonah Barrington
bye
(England) Ken Davidson
bye
(Australia) Ray Lewis
bye
(United Arab Republic) Mahmoud Kerim
bye
(England) Mike Hill
bye
(New Zealand) Peter Dibley
bye
(Wales) Duncan Davies
bye
bye
8	(United Arab Republic) Tewfik Shafik

Second Round
1	(England) (Republic of Ireland) Barrington	9	9	9
(England) Davidson	1	0	2
(Australia) Lewis	w/o
(United Arab Republic) Kerim	scr
(England) Hill	9	9	7	9
(New Zealand) Dibley	5	6	9	5
(Wales) Davies	w/o
8	(United Arab Republic) Shafik	scr

Third Round
1	(England) (Republic of Ireland) Barrington	9	9	9
(Australia) Lewis	1	2	3
(England) Hill	w/o
(Wales) Davies	scr

Quarter Finals
1	(England) (Republic of Ireland) Barrington	9	9	9
(England) Hill	3	4	2

=== Section 2 ===
First Round
5	(Australia) Cam Nancarrow	9	2	6	10	9
(Wales) Peter Stokes	7	9	9	8	7
(England) Stuart Courtney	10	4	9	5	9
(New Zealand) Don Burmeister	8	9	6	9	3
(South Africa) Doug Barrow	9	9	9
(England) Dick Carter	2	7	3
(England) Aly Aspahani
bye
4	(Australia) Ken Hiscoe	9	9	9
(India) Abdul Rashid	4	1	1
(England) John Ward
bye
(England) Paul Millman	8	10	9	4	9
(New Zealand) Dardir El Bakary	10	8	2	9	7
(England) Terry Pickering	6	10	9	6	9
(South Africa) Barry Jones	9	8	1	9	5

Second Round
5	(Australia) Nancarrow	8	9	10	9
(England) Courtney	10	5	8	5
(South Africa) Barrow	6	1	9	9	10
(England) Aspahani	9	9	1	0	8
4	(Australia) Hiscoe	9	9	9
(England) Ward	1	1	4
(England) Millman	9	9	9
(England) Pickering	0	0	1

Third Round
5	(Australia) Nancarrow	1	9	9	9
(South Africa) Barrow	9	1	4	1
4	(Australia) Hiscoe	9	9	9
(England) Millman	1	2	5

Quarter Finals
5	(Australia) Nancarrow	9	9	2	9
4	(Australia) Hiscoe	4	1	9	7

=== Section 3 ===
First Round
2	(Australia) Geoff Hunt
bye
(South Africa) Graham MacDonald
bye
(South Africa) Dawie Botha
bye
(England) Philip Ayton
bye
7	(England) Mike Corby
bye
(South Africa) Derek Broom
bye
(New Zealand) Johnny Isaacs	9	9	10
(United Arab Republic) K M Ibrahim	6	6	9
(Pakistan) Khan Din	9	9	3	9
(England) Tony Breakwell	6	2	9	3

Second Round
2	(Australia) Hunt	9	9	9
(South Africa) MacDonald	5	0	1
(South Africa) Botha	2	9	8	9	9
(England) Ayton	9	2	10	1	7
7	(England) Corby	0	6	9	9	9
(South Africa) Broom	9	9	7	3	5
(New Zealand) Isaacs	9	9	9
(Pakistan) Khan Din	7	6	5

Third Round
2	(Australia) Hunt	1	9	9	9
(South Africa) Botha	1	4	7
7	(England) Corby	4	9	9	9
(New Zealand) Isaacs	9	7	1	7

Quarter Finals
2	(Australia) Hunt	9	9	3	9
7	(England) Corby	4	7	9	7

=== Section 4 ===
First Round
3	(United Arab Republic) Abdelfattah Abou Taleb	3	9	10	9
(United Arab Republic) Maged Abaza	9	5	8	6
(England) Clive Francis
bye
(New Zealand) Trevor Johnston	8	9	9	9
(England) Brian Wise	10	6	3	6
(India) Jamal Din	8	9	10	2
(United Arab Republic) Samir Nadim	10	3	8	2	ret
6	(Australia) Dick Carter	9	9	9
(United Arab Republic) Mohamed Khalifa	3	0	7
(England) Don Innes
bye
(United Arab Republic) Ahmed Nadi	9	9	9
(England) Mike Eggleton	2	4	4
(England) Mike Grundy	9	10	9
(Australia) Nev Johnson	1	9	1

Second Round
2	(United Arab Republic) Taleb	9	9	9
(England) Francis	0	5	6
(New Zealand) Johnston	w/o
(India) Jamal Din	scr
6	(Australia) Carter	6	9	9	9
(England) Innes	9	0	2	3
(United Arab Republic) Nadi	2	9	9	9
(England) Grundy	9	3	2	3

Third Round
2	(United Arab Republic) Taleb	9	9	3	9
(New Zealand) Johnston	6	3	9	4
6	(Australia) Carter	9	10	9
(United Arab Republic) Nadi	6	8	5

Quarter Finals
2	(United Arab Republic) Taleb	6	10	9	9
6	(Australia) Carter	9	9	6	4

Preceded by 1968	British Open Squash Championships; England (London); 1969	Succeeded by 1970
