= 1967 Men's British Open Squash Championship =

British squash event

British Open Squash Championships
- 29th British Open Championships

Details
- Location: London, England
- Venue: Lansdowne Club

The 1967 British Open Championship was held at the Lansdowne Club in London from 12–21 December 1966.
Jonah Barrington won the title defeating Aftab Jawaid in the final to become the first British winner since 1938.

== Seeds ==
1. (United Arab Republic) Abdelfattah Abou Taleb
2. (Pakistan) Aftab Jawaid
3. (United Arab Republic) Tewfik Shafik
4. (United Arab Republic) Kamal Zaghloul
5. (Republic of Ireland) Jonah Barrington
6. (United Arab Republic) Ahmed Nadi
7. (United Arab Republic) Ibrahim Amin
8. (Pakistan) Mohammed Yasin

== Draw and results ==
=== First round ===
Player One	Player Two	Score
(United Arab Republic) Sherif Afifi	(England) Richard Hawkey	9-7 6-9 9-4 9-6
(Wales) Peter Stokes	(India) Yusuf Khan	5-9 6-9 9-6 9-0 9-5
(England) David Brazier	(England) Humphrey Truman	9-2 9-5 10-9
(England) Pat Kirton	(England) Don Innes	9-6 9-1 4-9 9-6
(England) Nigel Faulks	(Scotland) George Chisholm	10-8 9-6 9-6
(England) John Ward	(England) Paul R Goodwin	9-2 9-5 9-3
(England) Mike Corby	(United Arab Republic) Maged Abaza	9-4 9-0 9-1
(England) Tony Gathercole	(England) Henry Macintosh	w/o
(South Africa) David Woods	(United Arab Republic) Samir Nadim	5-9 9-5 9-6 9-0
(England) Jonathan Smith	(England) John Skinner	4-9 0-9 9-4 9-5 9-6
(Wales) Denis Hughes	(England) Mike Breckon	9-4 10-9 9-6
(United Arab Republic) Aly Abdel Aziz	(England) J S Barton	9-4 9-5 7-9 9-3
(England) Mike Thurgur	(Pakistan) Mohamed Saleem	w/o
(England) Jeremy Lyon	(England) Philip E Goodwin	9-3 9-2 9-1
(England) Mike Hill	(England) Paul Millman	9-7 9-2 9-2
(England) Clive Francis	(England) Arthur Catherine	9-4 9-6 9-4

=== Second round ===
Player One	Player Two	Score
(United Arab Republic) Sherif Afifi	(South Africa) David Woods	3-9 9-6 9-4 6-9 9-7
(Wales) Peter Stokes	(England) Jonathan Smith	4-9 9-7 9-2 9-4
(England) David Brazier	(Wales) Denis Hughes	9-6 9-10 7-9 9-0 9-5
(England) Pat Kirton	(United Arab Republic) Aly Abdel Aziz	9-7 9-3 4-9 9-7
(England) Nigel Faulks	(England) Mike Thurgur	9-0 3-9 9-2 10-8
(England) John Ward	(England) Jeremy Lyon	5-9 6-9 9-1 9-6 9-2
(England) Mike Corby	(England) Mike Hill	9-7 9-2 9-0
(England) Tony Gathercole	(England) Clive Francis	w/o

=== Main draw ===
Third round
1	(United Arab Republic) Abdelfattah Abou Taleb	9	9	9
(England) Tony Gathercole	5	5	4
5	(England) (Republic of Ireland) Jonah Barrington	9	7	9	9
(England) Mike Corby	5	9	7	4
3	(United Arab Republic) Tewfik Shafik +	scr
(Wales) Peter Stokes	w/o
7	(United Arab Republic) Ibrahim Amin	9	9	9
(England) Pat Kirton	0	5	3
2	(Pakistan) Aftab Jawaid	9	9	3	4	9
(England) John Ward	3	3	9	9	5
6	(United Arab Republic) Ahmed Nadi	6	9	9	9
(England) Nigel Faulks	9	6	6	6
4	(United Arab Republic) Kamal Zaghloul	9	9	9
(England) David Brazier	5	7	6
8	(Pakistan) Mo Yasin	6	9	9	9
(United Arab Republic) Sherif Afifi	9	4	4	4

Quarter-finals
1	(United Arab Republic) Taleb	4	1	10	5
5	(England) (Republic of Ireland) Barrington	9	9	8	9
(Wales) Stokes	6	9	5	4
7	(United Arab Republic) Amin	9	7	9	9
2	(Pakistan) Jawaid	9	9	9	9
6	(United Arab Republic) Nadi	10	4	6	2
4	(United Arab Republic) Zaghloul	2	1	2
8	(Pakistan) Yasin	9	9	9

Semi-finals
5	(England) (Republic of Ireland) Barrington	9	4	9	9
7	(United Arab Republic) Amin	4	9	5	3
2	(Pakistan) Jawaid	4	9	9	2	10
8	(Pakistan) Yasin	9	6	2	9	8

Final
5	(England) (Republic of Ireland) Barrington	9	5	9	9
2	(Pakistan) Jawaid	2	9	3	1

+ Shafik withdrew after breaking his hand in practice.

=== Third Place ===
(Pakistan) Mo Yasin beat (United Arab Republic) Ibrahim Amin 9-1 9-6 10-9

Preceded by 1966	British Open Squash Championships; England (London); 1967	Succeeded by 1968
