= 1970 Men's British Open Squash Championship =

British Open Squash Championships
- 32nd British Open Championships

Details
- Location: Birmingham, England
- Venue: Edgbaston Priory Club

The 1970 British Open Championship was held at the Edgbaston Priory Club in Birmingham from 8–13 December 1969.
Jonah Barrington won his third title defeating Geoff Hunt in the final.

== Seeds ==
1. (Australia) Geoff Hunt
2. (Republic of Ireland) Jonah Barrington
3. (United Arab Republic) Abdelfattah Abou Taleb
4. (Pakistan) Aftab Jawaid
5. (England) Mike Corby
6. (Pakistan) Mohammed Yasin
7. (United Arab Republic) Ahmed Nadi
8. (Pakistan) Sharif Khan

== Draw and results ==
=== First round ===
Player One	Player Two	Score
(England) John Ward	(England) Clive Francis	9-4 10-9 9-1
(Scotland) Kim Bruce-Lockhart	(Pakistan) Khan Din	9-2 9-4 ret
(England) Philip Ayton	(England) Mike Thurgur	9-1 9-0 9-1
(England) Paul Millman	(England) Tony Swift	10-8 3-9 9-7 9-2
(England) David D’Arcy Hughes	(England) Ian Turley	10-9 4-9 5-9 10-8 10-8
(England) John Easter	(England) Mike Breckon	10-8 9-0 9-3
(England) Mike Hill	(England) Alan Sims	9-3 9-2 9-7
(England) John Ramsden	(Australia) H M Morton	9-2 9-6 9-6
(England) Don Innes	(England) A W Barrett	9-6 9-6 9-0
(England) Stuart Courtney	(India) Jamal Din	9-3 9-0 9-1
(Wales) Michael Griffiths	(England) Brian Wise	9-3 9-4 9-5
(England) Bryan Patterson	(Wales) Duncan Davies	9-7 9-4 1-9 3-9 9-1
(England) Alan Purnell	(England) John Upton	3-9 9-6 7-9 9-7 9-0
(England) Tony Breakwell	(England) Dick Carter	2-9 8-10 9-4 9-5 9-7
(England) Mike de Semlyen	(England) Ian Pont	9-2 9-7 9-0
(Rhodesia) Richard Zacks	(England) Peter Richards	10-8 10-8 9-2

=== Second round ===
Player One	Player Two	Score
(Scotland) Kim Bruce-Lockhart	(England) John Ward	6-9 9-4 6-9 9-0 9-5
(England) David D’Arcy Hughes	(England) Stuart Courtney	7-9 3-9 10-8 9-1 9-6
(England) Paul Millman	(Wales) Michael Griffiths	9-2 9-1 9-6
(England) Mike Hill	(England) Bryan Patterson	9-1 9-5 9-3
(England) John Ramsden	(England) Alan Purnell	9-7 1-9 9-1 4-9 9-6
(England) Don Innes	(England) Tony Breakwell	9-3 9-5 9-1
(England) Philip Ayton	(England) Mike de Semlyen	9-1 9-1 9-1
(England) John Easter	(Rhodesia) Richard Zacks	7-9 9-4 9-4 5-9 9-1

=== Main draw ===
Third round
2	(England) (Republic of Ireland) Jonah Barrington	7	9	9	9
(England) Don Innes	9	4	1	6
(England) John Easter	9	9	10
7	(United Arab Republic) Ahmed Nadi	7	2	8
6	(Pakistan) Mo Yasin	9	9	9
(Scotland) Kim Bruce-Lockhart	1	2	6
3	(United Arab Republic) Abdelfattah Abou Taleb	0	9	9	9
(England) David D'Arcy-Hughes	9	6	4	6
1	(Australia) Geoff Hunt	9	9	9	9
(England) Philip Ayton	0	10	5	2
(England) Paul Millman	9	9	5	10
8	(Pakistan) Sharif Khan	6	4	9	8
4	(Pakistan) Aftab Jawaid	9	9	9
(England) John Ramsden	0	0	0
5	(England) Mike Corby	6	9	9	9
(England) Mike Hill	9	2	7	1

Quarter-finals
2	(England) (Republic of Ireland) Barrington	9	9	9
(England) Easter	6	1	4
6	(Pakistan) Yasin	9	9	5	9
3	(United Arab Republic) Taleb	6	0	9	2
1	(Australia) Hunt	9	10	10
(England) Millman	3	8	9
4	(Pakistan) Jawaid	7	10	9	9
5	(England) Corby	9	8	1	4

Semi-finals
2	(England) (Republic of Ireland) Barrington	9	6	9	9
6	(Pakistan) Yasin	5	9	5	5
1	(Australia) Hunt	9	2	9	9
4	(Pakistan) Jawaid	7	9	1	6

Final
2	(England) (Republic of Ireland) Barrington	9	3	9	9
1	(Australia) Hunt	7	9	4	4

=== Third Place ===
(Pakistan) Aftab Jawaid beat (Pakistan) Muhammad Yasin 5-9 9-2 9-4 9-1

Preceded by 1969	British Open Squash Championships; England (London); 1970	Succeeded by 1971
