= 1968 Men's British Open Squash Championship =

British Open Squash Championships
- 30th British Open Championships

Details
- Location: London, England
- Venue: Lansdowne Club

The 1968 British Open Championship was held at the Lansdowne Club in London from 12–20 December 1967.
Jonah Barrington won his second consecutive title defeating Abdelfattah Abou Taleb in the final.

== Seeds ==
1. (Republic of Ireland) Jonah Barrington
2. (United Arab Republic) Abdelfattah Abou Taleb
3. (United Arab Republic) Kamal Zaghloul
4. (England) Jeremy Lyon
5. (England) David Brazier
6. (Wales) Denis Hughes
7. (England) Pat Kirton
8. (United Arab Republic) Ahmed Nadi

== Draw and results ==
=== First round ===
(England) Mike Thurgur beat (England) M McDonald 9-2 10-9 9-0
(England) Clive Francis beat (England) John Upton 9-4 9-4 9-2
(United Arab Republic) Aly Abdel Aziz beat (Australia) J L Moore 9-0 9-2 9-6
(England) Mike Hill beat (England) John Skinner 5-9 9-2 9-2 9-6
(England) Nigel Broomfield beat (England) Patrick Keenan 9-2 9-5 9-1
(England) Richard Boddington beat (United Arab Republic) Samir Nadim 9-5 9-10 9-4 5-9 9-3
(England) Chris Stahl beat (England) Richard White 9-2 9-6 6-9 9-4
(England) Nigel Faulks beat (England) J S Barton 9-5 6-9 9-1 9-5
(South Africa) Barry Jones beat (Wales) T D Phillips 4-9 10-8 9-5 6-9 9-1
(England) Peter Richards beat (England) Philip E Goodwin 9-7 9-3 ret
(England) John Ward beat (Wales) Peter Stokes 9-4 9-3 8-10 2-0 9-6
(England) Don Innes beat (England) Paul Millman 4-9 9-6 10-9 9-0
(England) John Easter beat (England) Chris Orriss 9-2 9-3 4-9 9-5
(England) Alan Sims beat (England) Arthur Catherine 9-6 2-9 9-7 9-5
(England) Peter Chalk beat (England) John Ward 4-9 9-7 9-1 9-10 9-6
(Wales) Michael Griffiths beat (England) Richard Hawkey 9-7 9-5 4-9 10-8

=== Second round ===
(England) Mike Thurgur beat (South Africa) Barry Jones 9-3 6-9 9-5 9-6
(England) Clive Francis beat (England) Peter Richards 4-9 7 10-9 9-6
(United Arab Republic) Aly Abdel Aziz beat (England) John Ward 9-4 9-2 3-9 9-7
(England) Mike Hill beat (England) Don Innes 9-1 9-5 6-9 9-7
(England) Nigel Broomfield beat (England) John Easter 9-2 9-3 9-1
(England) Richard Boddington beat (England) Alan Sims 9-5 9-2 9-2
(England) Chris Stahl beat (England) Peter Chalk 9-6 9-5 2-9 9-7
(Wales) Michael Griffiths beat (England) Nigel Faulks 5-9 9-6 9-6

=== Main draw ===
Third round
1	(England) (Republic of Ireland) Jonah Barrington	9	9	9
(England) Mike Hill	7	3	5
5	(England) David Brazier	9	9	9
(Wales) Michael Griffiths	0	1	4
3	(United Arab Republic) Kamal Zaghloul	5	9	9	8	9
(England) Chris Stahl	9	2	4	10	6
7	(England) Pat Kirton	9	2	9	6	3
(England) Richard Boddington	7	9	5	9	9
2	(United Arab Republic) Abdelfattah Abou Taleb	9	9	9
(England) Clive Francis	4	4	3
6	(Wales) Denis Hughes	8	10	6	9	9
(United Arab Republic) Aly Abdel Aziz	10	8	9	1	5
4	(England) Jeremy Lyon	9	9	9
(England) Mike Thurgur	1	7	6
(England) Nigel Broomfield	1	8	9	2
8	(United Arab Republic) Ahmed Nadi	9	9	4	9

Quarter-finals
1	(England) (Republic of Ireland) Barrington	9	9	9
5	(England) Brazier	2	7	5
3	(United Arab Republic) Zaghloul	9	2	9	4	9
(England) Boddington	7	9	5	9	3
2	(United Arab Republic) Taleb	8	9	9	5	9
6	(Wales) Hughes	10	2	5	9	3
4	(England) Lyon	9	10	9
8	(United Arab Republic) Nadi	0	8	7

Semi-finals
1	(England) (Republic of Ireland) Barrington	9	9	9
3	(United Arab Republic) Zaghloul	2	2	0
2	(United Arab Republic) Taleb	5	9	7	9	9
4	(England) Lyon	9	4	9	4	2

Final
1	(England) (Republic of Ireland) Barrington	9	9	9
2	(United Arab Republic) Taleb	6	0	3

=== Third Place ===
(England) Jeremy Lyon beat (United Arab Republic) Kamal Zaghloul 5-9 9-2 9-6 9-3

Preceded by 1967	British Open Squash Championships; England (London); 1968	Succeeded by 1969
