= Italy men's national squash team =

Italy
- Coach: Marcus Berrett & Tim Simpson
- Association: Italian Squash Federation
- Colors: Blue & White

World Team Championships
- First year: 1989
- Titles: 0
- Runners-up: 0
- Best finish: 7th
- Entries: 7

European Team Championships
- Titles: 0
- Runners-up: 0
- Best finish: 3rd

The Italy men's national squash team represents Italy in international squash team competitions, and is governed by Italian Squash Federation.

Since 1989, Italy has participated in two quarter finals of the World Squash Team Open.

== Current team ==
- Omar Zaki Masoud
- Filippo Conti
- Lorenzo Staurengo
- Daniele De Bartolomeo

== Results ==
=== World Team Squash Championships ===
| Year | Result | Position | W | L |
|---|---|---|---|---|
| (Australia) Melbourne 1967 | Did not present | | | |
| (England) Birmingham 1969 | Did not present | | | |
| (New Zealand) Palmerston North 1971 | Did not present | | | |
| (South Africa) Johannesburg 1973 | Did not present | | | |
| (England) Birmingham 1976 | Did not present | | | |
| (Canada) Toronto 1977 | Did not present | | | |
| (Australia) Brisbane 1979 | Did not present | | | |
| (Sweden) Stockholm 1981 | Did not present | | | |
| (New Zealand) Auckland 1983 | Did not present | | | |
| (Egypt) Cairo 1985 | Did not present | | | |
| (England) London 1987 | Did not present | | | |
| Singapore 1989 | Group Stage | 22nd | 1 | 7 |
| (Finland) Helsinki 1991 | Group Stage | 16th | 2 | 3 |
| (Pakistan) Karachi 1993 | Did not present | | | |
| (Egypt) Cairo 1995 | Group Stage | 20th | 4 | 2 |
| (Malaysia) Petaling Jaya 1997 | Group Stage | 22nd | 4 | 2 |
| (Egypt) Cairo 1999 | Did not present | | | |
| (Australia) Melbourne 2001 | Did not present | | | |
| (Austria) Vienna 2003 | Group Stage | 18th | 3 | 4 |
| (Pakistan) Islamabad 2005 | Did not present | | | |
| (India) Chennai 2007 | Did not present | | | |
| (Denmark) Odense 2009 | Quarter Final | 7th | 5 | 2 |
| (Germany) Paderborn 2011 | Quarter Final | DSQ | 5 | 2 |
| (France) Mulhouse 2013 | Did not present | | | |
| (Egypt) Cairo 2015 | Cancelled | | | |
| (France) Marseille 2017 | Did not present | | | |
| (United States) Washington, D.C. 2019 | Did not present | | | |
| Total | 7/26 | 0 Title | 24 | 22 |

=== European Squash Team Championships ===
| Year | Result | Position |
|---|---|---|
| (Scotland) Edinburgh 1973 | Not in the Top 4 | |
| (Sweden) Stockholm 1974 | Not in the Top 4 | |
| (Republic of Ireland) Dublin 1975 | Not in the Top 4 | |
| (Belgium) Brussels 1976 | Not in the Top 4 | |
| (England) Sheffield 1977 | Not in the Top 4 | |
| (Netherlands) Amsterdam 1978 | Not in the Top 4 | |
| (Germany) Hamburg 1979 | Not in the Top 4 | |
| (Finland) Helsinki 1980 | Not in the Top 4 | |
| (Netherlands) Amsterdam 1981 | Not in the Top 4 | |
| (Wales) Cardiff 1982 | Not in the Top 4 | |
| (Germany) Munich 1983 | Not in the Top 4 | |
| (Republic of Ireland) Dublin 1984 | Not in the Top 4 | |
| (Spain) Barcelona 1985 | Not in the Top 4 | |
| (France) Aix-en-Provence 1986 | Not in the Top 4 | |
| (Austria) Vienna 1987 | Not in the Top 4 | |
| (Netherlands) Warmond 1988 | Not in the Top 4 | |
| (Finland) Helsinki 1989 | Not in the Top 4 | |
| (Switzerland) Zürich 1990 | Not in the Top 4 | |
| (Germany) Gelsenkirchen 1991 | Not in the Top 4 | |
| (France) Aix-en-Provence 1992 | Not in the Top 4 | |
| (France) Aix-en-Provence 1993 | Not in the Top 4 | |
| (Germany) Zoetermeer 1994 | Not in the Top 4 | |
| (Netherlands) Amsterdam 1995 | Not in the Top 4 | |
| (Netherlands) Amsterdam 1996 | Not in the Top 4 | |
| (Denmark) Odense 1997 | Not in the Top 4 | |
| (Finland) Helsinki 1998 | Not in the Top 4 | |
| (Austria) Linz 1999 | Not in the Top 4 | |
| (Austria) Vienna 2000 | Not in the Top 4 | |
| (Netherlands) Eindhoven 2001 | Not in the Top 4 | |
| (Germany) Böblingen 2002 | Not in the Top 4 | |
| (England) Nottingham 2003 | Not in the Top 4 | |
| (France) Rennes 2004 | Not in the Top 4 | |
| (Netherlands) Amsterdam 2005 | Not in the Top 4 | |
| (Austria) Vienna 2006 | Not in the Top 4 | |
| (Italy) Riccione 2007 | Not in the Top 4 | |
| (Netherlands) Amsterdam 2008 | Not in the Top 4 | |
| (Sweden) Malmö 2009 | Not in the Top 4 | |
| (France) Aix-en-Provence 2010 | Not in the Top 4 | |
| (Finland) Espoo 2011 | Semi Final | 3rd |
| (Germany) Nuremberg 2012 | Not in the Top 4 | |
| (Netherlands) Amsterdam 2013 | Not in the Top 4 | |
| (Italy) Riccione 2014 | Not in the Top 4 | |
| (Denmark) Herning 2015 | Not in the Top 4 | |
| (Poland) Warsaw 2016 | Not in the Top 4 | |
| (Finland) Helsinki 2017 | Not in the Top 4 | |
| (Poland) Wrocław 2018 | Not in the Top 4 | |
| (England) Birmingham 2019 | Not in the Top 4 | |
| Total | x1 | |

== See also ==
- Italian Squash Federation
- World Team Squash Championships
- Italy women's national squash team
