= 1966 Men's British Open Squash Championship =

Championship

British Open Squash Championships
- 28th British Open Championships

Details
- Location: London, England
- Venue: Lansdowne Club

The 1966 British Open Championship was held at the Lansdowne Club in London from 13–22 December 1965.
Abdelfattah Abou Taleb won his third consecutive title defeating Aftab Jawaid. The competition came under criticism for the modern day physicality which increased the chances of players getting injured, in the first round Ward was taken to hospital following a head injury received whilst playing Jawaid. The champion Taleb also came under fire for his aggressive attitude, particularly in the final.

== Seeds ==
1. (United Arab Republic) Abdelfattah Abou Taleb
2. (Pakistan) Aftab Jawaid
3. (United Arab Republic) Tewfik Shafik
4. (United Arab Republic) Kamal Zaghloul
5. (England) Gerald Massy
6. (England) Jeremy Lyon
7. (Republic of Ireland) Jonah Barrington
8. (United Arab Republic) Aly Abdel Aziz

== Draw and results ==
=== First qualifying round ===
Player One	Player Two	Score
(England) John Skinner	(England) Don Thompson	9-1 9-1 9-3
(England) Nigel Faulks	(England) Mike Hill	4-9 3-9 9-6 9-5 9-7
(United Arab Republic) Sherif Afifi	(England) Tom Hendry	9-4 9-4 9-7
(Scotland) George Chisholm	(England) Mike Corby	w/o
(England) Jonathan Smith	(England) Pat Kirton	1-9 6-9 9-3 9-0 9-0
(Pakistan) Sharif Khan	(England) Mike Breckon	9-6 9-4 3-9 9-1
(Wales) Denis Hughes	(England) Clive Francis	10-8 9-2 9-3
(United Arab Republic) Samir Nadim	(England) Richard Hawkey	9-3 10-8 9-4
(United Arab Republic) Maged Abaza	(England) Brian Wise	9-5 9-1 9-0

=== Second qualifying round ===
Player One	Player Two	Score
(England) John Skinner	(United Arab Republic) Samir Nadim	9-4 9-8 4-9 9-2
(England) John Ward	(England) Henry Macintosh	9-3 9-6 9-1
(United Arab Republic) Sherif Afifi	(England) Nigel Faulks	9-5 9-6 6-9 9-4
(United Arab Republic) Maged Abaza	(England) David Brazier	w/o
(England) Jonathan Smith	(England) Arthur Catherine	10-8 9-1 9-2
(Pakistan) Sharif Khan	(Scotland) George Chisholm	9-3 9-3 9-6
(Wales) Peter Stokes	(England) Ken Davidson	9-6 5-9 9-7 9-4
(Wales) Denis Hughes	(England) Tony Gathercole	w/o

=== Main draw ===
First round
1	(United Arab Republic) Abdelfattah Abou Taleb	9	9	9
(Wales) Peter Stokes	2	7	1
5	(England) Gerald Massy	9	6	5	ret
(England) Jonathan Smith	6	9	9	w/o
3	(United Arab Republic) Tewfik Shafik	1	4	9	9	9
(Pakistan) Sharif Khan	9	9	0	7	7
7	(Republic of Ireland) Jonah Barrington	9	9	9
(Wales) Denis Hughes	5	2	7
2	(Pakistan) Aftab Jawaid	9	9	9
(England) John Ward	4	1	2
(United Arab Republic) Maged Abaza	4	4	4
6	(England) Jeremy Lyon	9	9	9
4	(United Arab Republic) Kamal Zaghloul	5	9	9	9
(England) John Skinner	9	1	3	2
8	(United Arab Republic) Aly Abdel Aziz	9	9	5	6	9
(United Arab Republic) Sherif Afifi	5	6	9	9	1

Quarter-finals
1	(United Arab Republic) Taleb	9	9	9
(England) Smith	7	6	7
3	(United Arab Republic) Shafik	9	9	9
7	(Republic of Ireland) Barrington	6	6	6
2	(Pakistan) Jawaid	6	9	9	9
6	(England) Lyon	9	0	1	6
4	(United Arab Republic) Zaghloul	9	9	9
8	(United Arab Republic) Aziz	2	4	3

Semi-finals
1	(United Arab Republic) Taleb	6	9	7	9	9
3	(United Arab Republic) Shafik	9	7	9	2	3
2	(Pakistan) Jawaid	9	9	9
4	(United Arab Republic) Zaghloul	7	4	6

Final
1	(United Arab Republic) Taleb	9	5	9	9
3	(Pakistan) Jawaid	6	9	3	1

=== Third Place ===
(United Arab Republic) Kamal Zaghloul beat (United Arab Republic) Tewfik Shafik 8-10 9-2 9-7 8-10 9-5 9-0 0-9 9-1 9-6

Preceded by 1965	British Open Squash Championships; England (London); 1966	Succeeded by 1967
