= Spain men's national squash team =

Spain
- Coach: Constantino Casas
- Association: Spanish Squash Federation
- Colors: Black

World Team Championships
- First year: 1985
- Titles: 0
- Runners-up: 0
- Best finish: 8th
- Entries: 14

European Team Championships
- Titles: 0
- Runners-up: 1
- Best finish: 2nd

The Spain men's national squash team represents Spain in international squash team competitions, and is governed by Spanish Squash Federation.

== Current team ==
- Borja Golán
- Iker Pajares Bernabeu
- Edmon Lopez
- Carlos Cornes Ribadas
- Bernat Jaume

== Results ==
=== World Team Squash Championships ===
Year	Result	Position	W	L
(Australia) Melbourne 1967	Did not present			
(England) Birmingham 1969	Did not present			
(New Zealand) Palmerston North 1971	Did not present			
(South Africa) Johannesburg 1973	Did not present			
(England) Birmingham 1976	Did not present			
(Canada) Toronto 1977	Did not present			
(Australia) Brisbane 1979	Did not present			
(Sweden) Stockholm 1981	Did not present			
(New Zealand) Auckland 1983	Did not present			
(Egypt) Cairo 1985	Group Stage	18th	2	5
(England) London 1987	Group Stage	20th	3	7
Singapore 1989	Group Stage	14th	6	2
(Finland) Helsinki 1991	Group Stage	17th	3	3
(Pakistan) Karachi 1993	Group Stage	17th	3	3
(Egypt) Cairo 1995	Group Stage	18th	3	3
(Malaysia) Petaling Jaya 1997	Group Stage	21st	2	4
(Egypt) Cairo 1999	Group Stage	22nd	2	4
(Australia) Melbourne 2001	Did not present			
(Austria) Vienna 2003	Did not present			
(Pakistan) Islamabad 2005	Group Stage	17th	3	4
(India) Chennai 2007	Group Stage	19th	2	3
(Denmark) Odense 2009	Group Stage	23rd	1	4
(Germany) Paderborn 2011	Group Stage	17th	4	3
(France) Mulhouse 2013	Did not present			
(Egypt) Cairo 2015	Cancelled			
(France) Marseille 2017	Round of 16	11th	3	3
(United States) Washington, D.C. 2019	Quarter Final	8th	4	3
Total	14/26	0 Title	41	51

=== European Squash Team Championships ===
Year	Result	Position
(Scotland) Edinburgh 1973	Not in the Top 4	
(Sweden) Stockholm 1974	Not in the Top 4	
(Republic of Ireland) Dublin 1975	Not in the Top 4	
(Belgium) Brussels 1976	Not in the Top 4	
(England) Sheffield 1977	Not in the Top 4	
(Netherlands) Amsterdam 1978	Not in the Top 4	
(Germany) Hamburg 1979	Not in the Top 4	
(Finland) Helsinki 1980	Not in the Top 4	
(Netherlands) Amsterdam 1981	Not in the Top 4	
(Wales) Cardiff 1982	Not in the Top 4	
(Germany) Munich 1983	Not in the Top 4	
(Republic of Ireland) Dublin 1984	Not in the Top 4	
(Spain) Barcelona 1985	Not in the Top 4	
(France) Aix-en-Provence 1986	Not in the Top 4	
(Austria) Vienna 1987	Not in the Top 4	
(Netherlands) Warmond 1988	Not in the Top 4	
(Finland) Helsinki 1989	Not in the Top 4	
(Switzerland) Zürich 1990	Not in the Top 4	
(Germany) Gelsenkirchen 1991	Not in the Top 4	
(France) Aix-en-Provence 1992	Not in the Top 4	
(France) Aix-en-Provence 1993	Not in the Top 4	
(Germany) Zoetermeer 1994	Not in the Top 4	
(Netherlands) Amsterdam 1995	Not in the Top 4	
(Netherlands) Amsterdam 1996	Not in the Top 4	
(Denmark) Odense 1997	Not in the Top 4	
(Finland) Helsinki 1998	Not in the Top 4	
(Austria) Linz 1999	Not in the Top 4	
(Austria) Vienna 2000	Not in the Top 4	
(Netherlands) Eindhoven 2001	Not in the Top 4	
(Germany) Böblingen 2002	Not in the Top 4	
(England) Nottingham 2003	Not in the Top 4	
(France) Rennes 2004	Not in the Top 4	
(Netherlands) Amsterdam 2005	Not in the Top 4	
(Austria) Vienna 2006	Not in the Top 4	
(Italy) Riccione 2007	Not in the Top 4	
(Netherlands) Amsterdam 2008	Not in the Top 4	
(Sweden) Malmö 2009	Not in the Top 4	
(France) Aix-en-Provence 2010	Not in the Top 4	
(Finland) Espoo 2011	Not in the Top 4	
(Germany) Nuremberg 2012	Not in the Top 4	
(Netherlands) Amsterdam 2013	Not in the Top 4	
(Italy) Riccione 2014	Not in the Top 4	
(Denmark) Herning 2015	Not in the Top 4	
(Poland) Warsaw 2016	Not in the Top 4	
(Poland) Wrocław 2018	Semi Final	3rd
(England) Birmingham 2019	Final	2nd
Total	x1 - x1	

== See also ==
- Spanish Squash Federation
- Spain women's national squash team
- World Team Squash Championships
