= New Zealand men's national squash team =

New Zealand
- Coach: Paul Hornsby
- Association: Squash New Zealand
- Colors: Black & White

World Team Championships
- First year: 1967
- Titles: 0
- Runners-up: 3
- Best finish: 2nd
- Entries: 26

The New Zealand men's national squash team represents New Zealand in international squash team competitions, and is governed by Squash New Zealand.

Since 1967, New Zealand has participated in three finals of the World Squash Team Open.

== Current team ==
- Paul Coll
- Campbell Grayson
- Martin Knight
- Evan Williams

== Results ==
=== World Team Squash Championships ===
| Year | Result | Position | W | L |
|---|---|---|---|---|
| (Australia) Melbourne 1967 | Group Stage | 3rd | 3 | 2 |
| (England) Birmingham 1969 | Group Stage | 5th | 1 | 4 |
| (New Zealand) Palmerston North 1971 | Group Stage | 5th | 2 | 4 |
| (South Africa) Johannesburg 1973 | Group Stage | 4th | 1 | 3 |
| (England) Birmingham 1976 | Group Stage | 5th | 5 | 2 |
| (Canada) Toronto 1977 | Final | 2nd | 6 | 1 |
| (Australia) Brisbane 1979 | Group Stage | 5th | 6 | 2 |
| (Sweden) Stockholm 1981 | Quarter Final | 5th | 7 | 1 |
| (New Zealand) Auckland 1983 | Group Stage | 5th | 6 | 3 |
| (Egypt) Cairo 1985 | Final | 2nd | 8 | 1 |
| (England) London 1987 | Final | 2nd | 7 | 1 |
| Singapore 1989 | Semi Final | 4th | 5 | 3 |
| (Finland) Helsinki 1991 | Group Stage | 5th | 5 | 2 |
| (Pakistan) Karachi 1993 | Group Stage | 5th | 3 | 3 |
| (Egypt) Cairo 1995 | Quarter Final | 7th | 2 | 4 |
| (Malaysia) Petaling Jaya 1997 | Group Stage | 11th | 4 | 2 |
| (Egypt) Cairo 1999 | Group Stage | 14th | 2 | 4 |
| (Australia) Melbourne 2001 | Group Stage | 17th | 4 | 2 |
| (Austria) Vienna 2003 | Group Stage | 17th | 5 | 2 |
| (Pakistan) Islamabad 2005 | Group Stage | 15th | 3 | 3 |
| (India) Chennai 2007 | Round of 16 | 13th | 3 | 3 |
| (Denmark) Odense 2009 | Round of 16 | 10th | 3 | 3 |
| (Germany) Paderborn 2011 | Group Stage | 22nd | 3 | 4 |
| (France) Mulhouse 2013 | Round of 16 | 15th | 3 | 4 |
| (Egypt) Cairo 2015 | Cancelled | | | |
| (France) Marseille 2017 | Quarter Final | 6th | 4 | 2 |
| (United States) Washington, D.C. 2019 | Quarter Final | 5th | 5 | 2 |
| Total | 26/26 | 0 Title | 106 | 67 |

== See also ==
- Squash New Zealand
- World Team Squash Championships
- New Zealand women's national squash team
