= 1965 Men's British Open Squash Championship =

British Open Squash Championships
- 27th British Open Championships

Details
- Location: London, England
- Venue: Lansdowne Club

The 1965 British Open Championship was held at the Lansdowne Club in London from 9–16 December 1964.
Abdelfattah Abou Taleb won his second consecutive title defeating Ibrahim Amin in the final.
Roshan Khan seeded five pulled out from the main draw.

== Seeds ==
1. (United Arab Republic) Abdelfattah Abou Taleb
2. (Pakistan) Aftab Jawaid
3. (United Arab Republic) Tewfik Shafik
4. (United Arab Republic) Ibrahim Amin
5. (Pakistan) Roshan Khan
6. (England) Jeremy Lyon
7. (United Arab Republic) Kamal Zaghloul
8. (United Arab Republic) Aly Abdel Aziz

== Draw and results ==
=== Section 1 ===
First round
1	(United Arab Republic) Abdelfattah Abou Taleb	9	9	9
(England) Nigel Faulks	3	5	2
(England) Gerald Massy	5	9	9	9
(Pakistan) Khan Din	9	5	5	3
(South Africa) David Woods	9	4	9	10
(United Arab Republic) Samir Nadim	4	9	4	8
(England) Richard Hawkey	9	4	3	9	9
(England) Henry Macintosh	1	9	9	5	6
3	(United Arab Republic) Tewfik Shafik	7	3	9	9	9
(England) Brian Harris	9	9	1	0	2
(United Arab Republic) Sherif Afifi	6	10	2	9	9
(New Zealand) Charlie Waugh	9	8	9	7	2
7	(United Arab Republic) Kamal Zaghloul	3	9	9	9
(Scotland) George Chisholm	9	7	2	7
(Pakistan) Sharif Khan	9	9	9
(England) Mike Hill	3	6	0

Second round
1	(United Arab Republic) Taleb	10	9	9
(England) Massy	8	2	3
(South Africa) Woods	9	9	9
(England) Richard Hawkey	5	4	4
3	(United Arab Republic) Shafik	9	9	10
(United Arab Republic) Afifi	4	8	9
7	(United Arab Republic) Zaghloul	1	9	5	9	9
(Pakistan) Sharif Khan	9	5	9	5	3

Quarter-finals
1	(United Arab Republic) Taleb	1	6	2
(South Africa) Woods	2	1	3
3	(United Arab Republic) Shafik	9	9	9
7	(United Arab Republic) Zaghloul	7	4	0

Semi-finals
1	(United Arab Republic) Taleb	9	9	9
3	(United Arab Republic) Shafik	2	3	3

=== Section 2 ===
First round
2	(Pakistan) Aftab Jawaid	9	9	9
(England) I G Davies	4	2	4
(Wales) David Jude	9	9	6	10
(Pakistan) Gul Rehman	4	5	9	8
6	(England) Jeremy Lyon	9	9	9
(England) John Ward	0	0	3
(England) Mike Corby	9	9	6	9
(England) John Skinner	6	4	9	4
4	(United Arab Republic) Ibrahim Amin	9	9	9
(England) Clive Francis	7	2	6
(England) David Brazier	9	9	9	9
(Australia) Ken Watson	10	4	7	6
8	(United Arab Republic) Aly Abdel Aziz	7	6	9	9	10
(Wales) Denis Hughes	9	9	8	1	8
(England) Pat Kirton	9	9	9
(England) Arthur Catherine	2	1	2

Second round
2	(Pakistan) Aftab Jawaid	9	9	9
(Wales) Jude	0	0	3
6	(England) Lyon	9	9	9
(England) Corby	7	0	6
4	(United Arab Republic) Amin	9	9	9
(England) Brazier	7	2	0
8	(United Arab Republic) Aziz	9	9	10
(England) Kirton	7	0	9

Quarter-finals
2	(Pakistan) Jawaid	9	9	9
6	(England) Lyon	0	6	4
4	(United Arab Republic) Amin	9	2	9	9
8	(United Arab Republic) Aziz	6	9	6	7

Semi-finals
2	(Pakistan) Jawaid	9	4	9	6	6
4	(United Arab Republic) Amin	1	9	6	9	9

=== Third Place ===
(United Arab Republic) Abdelfattah Abou Taleb beat (United Arab Republic) Ibrahim Amin 9-0 0-9 9-1 9-6

=== Final ===
(United Arab Republic) Tewfik Shafik beat (Pakistan) Aftab Jawaid 9-3 2-9 9-5 3-9 10-8

Preceded by 1964	British Open Squash Championships; England (London); 1965	Succeeded by 1966
