= 1963 Men's British Open Squash Championship =

British Open Squash Championships
- 25th British Open Championships

Details
- Location: London, England
- Venue: Lansdowne Club

The 1963 Open Championship was held at the Lansdowne Club in London from 26 November – 5 December 1962.
Azam Khan was unable to defend his title after struggling to regain fitness following an Achilles tendon injury. Mo Khan won the Open Championship defeating Abdelfattah Abou Taleb in the final. Incredibly Taleb had led the final two sets to one and eight points to one needing just one more point to become champion. Mo Khan however recovered to win the set and then the match in a remarkable comeback. Roshan Khan defeated Aftab Jawaid in the third place play off 9-3 9-6 5-9 4-9 9-3.

== Seeds ==
1. (Pakistan) Mo Khan
2. (Pakistan) Roshan Khan
3. (United Arab Republic) Abdelfattah Abou Taleb
4. (Scotland) Mike Oddy

== Draw and results ==
=== First qualifying round ===
(England) John Skinner beat (England) Terry Pickering 9-0 6-9 3-9 9-0 9-2
(Pakistan) Aftab Jawaid beat (England) Jonathan Smith 7-9 9-5 8-10 9-7 10-9
(England) Brian Wise beat (England) Peter Fuente w/o
(United Arab Republic) Sherif Afifi beat (Australia) Ken Watson 5-9 9-4 9-5 9-3
(England) Richard Hawkey beat (England) Don Thompson 9-0 6-9 9-7 6-9 9-3

=== Second qualifying round ===
(England) Tony Gathercole beat (England) Mike Corby 5-9 9-4 6-9 9-7 9-5
(Scotland) George Chisholm beat (England) Richard Hawkey 9-2 9-2 1-9 1-9 10-8
(United Arab Republic) Sherif Afifi beat (England) Brian Wise 10-9 7-9 9-6 9-7
(United Arab Republic) Aly Abdel Aziz beat (England) Pat Kirton 9-7 4-9 9-2 10-9
(Pakistan) Aftab Jawaid beat (England) John Skinner

=== Main draw ===
First round
1	(Pakistan) Mo Khan	9	9	9
(England) Jeremy Lyon	0	0	2
(United Arab Republic) Aly Abdel Aziz	9	0	2	9	9
(India) Jamal Din	6	9	9	2	1
4	(Scotland) Mike Oddy	3	3	9	3
(United Arab Republic) Kamal Zaghloul	9	9	4	9
(Pakistan) Aftab Jawaid	9	9	9
(United Arab Republic) Sherif Afifi	1	2	6
3	(United Arab Republic) Abdelfattah Abou Taleb	9	9	9
(England) Tony Gathercole	3	6	3
(United Arab Republic) Tewfik Shafik	6	9	9	9
(Wales) Denis Hughes	9	7	6	6
2	(Pakistan) Roshan Khan	9	9	9
(United Arab Republic) Ibrahim Amin	5	1	7
(Scotland) George Chisholm	9	9	5	2	9
(England) Mike Corby+	7	7	9	9	6

Quarter-finals
1	(Pakistan) Mo Khan	9	9	9
(United Arab Republic) Aly Abdel Aziz	0	0	5
(United Arab Republic) Zaghloul	1	9	1	9	2
(Pakistan) Jawaid	9	6	9	6	9
3	(United Arab Republic) Taleb	9	9	2	9
(United Arab Republic) Shafik	1	0	9	3
2	(Pakistan) Roshan Khan	9	9	9
(Scotland) Chisholm	4	5	4

Semi-finals
1	(Pakistan) Mo Khan	10	9	9
5	(Pakistan) Jawaid	8	3	3
3	(United Arab Republic) Taleb	2	9	9	9
2	(Pakistan) Roshan Khan	9	7	0	6

Final
1	(Pakistan) Mo Khan	9	5	3	10	9
3	(United Arab Republic) Taleb	4	9	9	8	6

+ Corby gained a lucky losers place by virtue of the withdrawal of Yusuf Khan of India.

Preceded by 1962	British Open Squash Championships; England (London); 1963	Succeeded by 1964
