= 1973 European Squash Team Championships =

Squash tournament

- 1st
- Location: (Scotland) Edinburgh
- Venue: Meadowbank Sports Centre
- Date: 27 – 30 April 1973
- Website europeansquash.com

Results
- Champions: Men England

The 1973 European Squash Team Championships was the 1st edition of European Squash Team Championships for squash players. The event was held at the Meadowbank Sports Centre in Edinburgh, Scotland, from 27 to 30 April 1973. The tournament was organised by the European Squash Rackets Federation (ESRF).

The England men's team won their first title. Ireland took the bronze medal.

== Men's tournament ==
=== Group stage ===
Pool A

Pos	Team	P	W	L	Pts
1	England	4	4	0	8
2	(Republic of Ireland) Ireland	4	3	1	6
3	Sweden	4	2	2	4
4	Denmark	4	1	3	2
5	Monaco	4	0	4	0

Pool B

Pos	Team	P	W	L	Pts
1	Scotland	4	4	0	8
2	Wales	4	3	1	6
3	Finland	4	2	2	4
4	Netherlands	4	1	3	2
5	Greece	4	0	4	0

=== Third place ===
Ireland
4
Third place

Wales
1

			1	2	3	4	5
1	(Republic of Ireland) (Wales)	Donald Pratt; Peter Stokes	9; 10	9; 2	5; 9	9; 0	9; 5
2	(Republic of Ireland) (Wales)	Bob Weir; Robert Dolman	9; 7	8; 7				retired
3	(Republic of Ireland) (Wales)	Michael Hickey; Mike Griffiths	7; 9	9 ?	3; 9	9; 4	3; 9
4	(Republic of Ireland) (Wales)	John Young; James Beattie	5; 4	9; 2	9; 5	9
5	(Republic of Ireland) (Wales)	Donald Byrne; Willie de Lloyd	1; 9	9; 3	9; 6	9; 3

=== Final ===
England
5
Final

Scotland
0

			1	2	3	4	5
1	(England) (Scotland)	Philip Ayton; Kim Bruce-Lockhart	9; 4	9; 6	6; 9	9; 4
2	(England) (Scotland)	John Easter; Chris Wilson	9; 1	9; 1	9; 5
3	(England) (Scotland)	Stuart Courtney; Robin Chalmers	9; 4	9; 3	9; 0
4	(England) (Scotland)	Bryan Patterson; Mike Oddy	5; 9	9; 3	9; 6	9; 1
5	(England) (Scotland)	Paul Millman; Duncan Smith	9; 7	9; 1	9; 4
