= Squash in Ireland =

Overview of the sport in Ireland

Squash is a largely recreational sport in Ireland. The sport experienced a resurgence in popularity in Ireland during the 2000s, following a dip in its profile during the 1990s. In late 2024, there were 58 clubs on the island, with 11 in Northern Ireland and 47 in the Republic of Ireland.

== Governance ==
The Irish Squash Federation, also known as Squash Ireland, is the national governing body for squash in Ireland. Founded in 1935, it celebrated its 75th anniversary in 2010. There are four provincial associations (Connacht Squash, Leinster Squash, Munster Squash and Ulster Squash) which organise provincial squash leagues.

== Notable players ==
Notable Irish squash players include Jonah Barrington, Derek Ryan, Madeline Perry, Liam Kenny, Aisling Blake and John Rooney. Jonah Barrington received a lifetime achievement award in 2006 at the World Squash Awards.

== Competitions ==
The Irish Open is usually held at the Fitzwilliam Lawn Tennis Club.

=== Irish Men's Open ===
Between 1958 and 1972, Donald Pratt won the Irish Open ten times.

During the 1960s and 1970s, Jonah Barrington won a number of Irish Open titles. Barrington won it in 1966, 1967, 1969, and 1979 and was runner-up (to his rival, Geoff Hunt) in 1972. In 1976, Geoff Hunt beat Mohibullah Khan in the (then) new Squash Ireland Centre in Dublin.

Peter Nicol won the competition in 2000 and 2001. The Irish Open was not held in 2002 and 2003. In 2005 the Pakistani squash team were unable to play in the Irish Open due to their visas for Ireland not being granted in time following qualification. Between 2005 and 2007, the men's competition was won by Ong Beng Hee, Borja Golán and Alex Gough respectively.; the 2022 winner was Greg Lobban.

=== Irish Women's Open ===
2003 marked the first Women's Irish Open since 1991, where Cassie Jackman - the 2003 losing finalist - reached the semi-finals.

Vanessa Atkinson won the title in 2003 and 2004. Madeline Perry won back-to-back Irish Open titles in 2005, 2006 and 2007 and went on to win the title three more times before retiring in 2015; the 2022 winner was Tinne Gilis.

=== Olympic Games ===
Ireland plans to send a Squash team to the 2028 Olympic Games in Los Angeles.

=== Other competitions ===
Belfast hosted the Women's International Squash Players Association World Championship in November 2006, with the final being played at the Ulster Hall.

The Irish senior ladies team have performed well at the WSF World Team Squash Championships, winning bronze in 1985 and finishing 5th in 2008. They also finished in 4th position at the European Team Championships in France.

== See also ==
- Ireland men's national squash team
- Ireland women's national squash team
