= 1962 Men's British Open Squash Championship =

British Open Squash Championships
- 24th British Open Championships

Details
- Location: London, England
- Venue: Royal Automobile Club

The 1962 Open Championship was held at the Royal Automobile Club in Pall Mall, London from 27 November – 4 December 1961.
Azam Khan won his fourth consecutive title beating Mo Khan in a repeat of the 1961 final. Roshan Khan defeated Dardir El Bakary in the third place play off 9-6 9-7 8-10 0-9 9-1.

== Seeds ==
1. (Pakistan) Azam Khan
2. (Pakistan) Mo Khan
3. (Pakistan) Roshan Khan
4. (United Arab Republic) Dardir El Bakary
5. (Scotland) Mike Oddy
6. (United Arab Republic) Abdelfattah Abou Taleb
7. (United Arab Republic) Kamal Zaghloul
8. (United Arab Republic) Ibrahim Amin

== Draw and results ==
=== Section 1 ===
First round
1	(Pakistan) Azam Khan	9	9	9
(England) P M R Robinson	0	1	3
(Wales) Denis Hughes	5	w/o
(Pakistan) Ali Akbar Khan	8	ret
5	(Scotland) Mike Oddy	9	9	7	9
(Pakistan) Hanif Khan	4	7	9	4
(India) Jamal Din	9	9	9
(England) Mike Breckon	5	0	4
3	(Pakistan) Roshan Khan	9	9	9
(Australia) Ken Watson	4	0	4
(Pakistan) Khan Din	9	9	9
(Rhodesia) David Hodgson	7	2	4
7	(United Arab Republic) Kamal Zaghloul	9	9	9
(England) D W Harman	2	5	5
(England) Humphrey Truman	9	6	9	9
(England) W J Ashford	7	9	5	0

Second round
1	(Pakistan) Azam Khan	10	9	9
(Wales) Hughes	8	4	4
5	(Scotland) Oddy	5	9	9	9
(India) Jamal Din	9	3	7	1
3	(Pakistan) Roshan Khan	9	9	9
(Pakistan) Khan Din	1	5	1
7	(United Arab Republic) Zaghloul	9	9	9	8	9
(England) Truman	10	5	6	10	7

Quarter finals
1	(Pakistan) Azam Khan	9	9	9
5	(Scotland) Oddy	3	5	4
3	(Pakistan) Roshan Khan	9	9	9
7	(United Arab Republic) Zaghloul	1	0	2

Semi finals
1	(Pakistan) Azam Khan	9	9	4	1	9
3	(Pakistan) Roshan Khan	5	3	9	9	0

=== Section 2 ===
First round
2	(Pakistan) Mo Khan	9	9	9
(England) Henry Macintosh	0	1	3
(England) Jeremy Lyon	w/o
(Pakistan) Gul Rehman	scr
6	(United Arab Republic) Abdelfattah Abou Taleb	9	9	9
(England) John Skinner	0	6	5
(United Arab Republic) Tewfik Shafik	9	9	9
(Iran) Matthew Farhang Mohtadi	1	5	4
4	(United Arab Republic) Dardir El Bakary	9	9	9
(England) J Lush	1	4	0
(England) Mike Corby	9	3	9	9
(England) Richard Hawkey	4	9	7	7
8	(United Arab Republic) Ibrahim Amin	9	9	9
(England) Pat Kirton	6	0	3
(England) J C Gordon	9	10	2	3	9
(England) Arthur Catherine	3	8	9	9	5

Second round
2	(Pakistan) Mo Khan	9	9	9
(England) Lyon	2	3	6
6	(United Arab Republic) Taleb	5	9	9	10
(United Arab Republic) Shafik	9	3	4	9
4	(United Arab Republic) El Bakary	9	9	9
(England) Corby	2	2	0
8	(United Arab Republic) Amin	9	9	9
(England) Gordon	3	2	2

Quarter round
2	(Pakistan) Mo Khan	9	9	9
6	(United Arab Republic) Taleb	1	2	3
4	(United Arab Republic) El Bakary	9	9	3	10
8	(United Arab Republic) Amin	5	1	9	8

Semi finals
2	(Pakistan) Mo Khan	9	9	9
4	(United Arab Republic) El Bakary	6	5	4

== Semi-finals & Final ==
Semi-finals
1	(Pakistan) Azam Khan	9	9	4	1	9
3	(Pakistan) Roshan Khan	5	3	9	9	0
2	(Pakistan) Mo Khan	9	9	9
4	(United Arab Republic) El Bakary	6	5	4

Final
1	(Pakistan) Azam Khan	9	7	10	2	9
2	(Pakistan) Mo Khan	6	9	8	9	4

Preceded by 1961	British Open Squash Championships; England (London); 1962	Succeeded by 1963
