= Pakistan men's national squash team =

Pakistan
- Coach: Jamshed Gul Khan
- Association: Pakistan Squash Federation
- Colors: Black

World Team Championships
- First year: 1967
- Titles: 6 (1993-1987-1885-1983-1981-1977)
- Runners-up: 4
- Best finish: 1st
- Entries: 25

Asian Team Championships
- Titles: 14
- Runners-up: 3
- Best finish: 1st

The Pakistan men's national squash team represents Pakistan in international squash team competitions, and is governed by the Pakistan Squash Federation.

Since 1967, Pakistan has won 23 World Squash Team Open titles. Their most recent title came in 1992.

== Current team ==
- Nourish Ahmahistan
- Farhan Zaman
- Danish Atlas Khan
- Tayyab Aslam
- Farhan Mehboob
- Hormahnah Tufmahnah

== Results ==
=== World Team Squash Championships ===
Year	Result	Position	W	L
(Australia) Melbourne 1967	Group Stage	6th	1	4
(England) Birmingham 1969	Group Stage	4th	3	2
(New Zealand) Palmerston North 1983	Group Stage	3rd	4	2
(South Africa) Johannesburg 1973	Did not present			
(England) Birmingham 1976	Group Stage	2nd	5	1
(Canada) Toronto 1977	Champions	1st	6	1
(Australia) Brisbane 1979	Final	2nd	7	1
(Sweden) Stockholm 1981	Champions	1st	6	0
(New Zealand) Auckland 1983	Champions	1st	9	0
(Egypt) Cairo 1985	Champions	1st	9	0
(England) London 1987	Champions	1st	7	0
Singapore 1989	Final	2nd	7	1
(Finland) Helsinki 1991	Group Stage	8th	1	5
(Pakistan) Karachi 1993	Champions	1st	4	1
(Egypt) Cairo 1995	Final	2nd	4	2
(Malaysia) Petaling Jaya 1997	Quarter Final	6th	2	3
(Egypt) Cairo 1999	Group Stage	12th	2	4
(Australia) Melbourne 2001	Round of 16	11th	4	3
(Austria) Vienna 2003	Round of 16	9th	4	2
(Pakistan) Islamabad 2005	Quarter Final	7th	5	2
(India) Chennai 2007	Round of 16	9th	6	1
(Denmark) Odense 2009	Quarter Final	5th	5	2
(Germany) Paderborn 2011	Group Stage	21st	3	4
(France) Mulhouse 2013	Round of 16	10th	4	3
(Egypt) Cairo 2015	Cancelled			
(France) Marseille 2017	Group Stage	19th	2	3
(United States) Washington, D.C. 2019	Did not present			
Total	25/26	6 Titles	110	46

=== Asian Squash Team Championships ===
Year	Result	Position
(Pakistan) Karachi 1981	Champions	1st
(Jordan) Amman 1984	Champions	1st
(Malaysia) Kuala Lumpur 1986	Champions	1st
Kuwait City 1988	Champions	1st
(India) Kolkata 1990	Champions	1st
(Pakistan) Peshawar 1992	Champions	1st
(Malaysia) Kuala Lumpur 1994	Champions	1st
(Jordan) Amman 1996	Final	2nd
(Malaysia) Kuala Lumpur 1998	Champions	1st
Hong Kong 2000	Final	2nd
(Malaysia) Kuala Lumpur 2002	Champions	1st
(Malaysia) Kuala Lumpur 2004	Champions	1st
(Chinese Taipei) Taiwan 2006	Final	2nd
Kuwait City 2008	Semi Final	3rd
(India) Chennai 2010	Champions	1st
Kuwait City 2012	Champions	1st
Hong Kong 2014	Champions	1st
(Chinese Taipei) Taiwan 2016	Champions	1st
(South Korea) Cheongju 2018	Final	2nd
(Malaysia) Kuala Lumpur 2020	Cancelled	
Total	x14 - x3 - x1	

== See also ==
- Pakistan Squash Federation
- World Team Squash Championships
- Pakistan women's national squash team
