= 1964 Men's British Open Squash Championship =

British Open Squash Championships
- 26th British Open Championships

Details
- Location: London, England
- Venue: Lansdowne Club

The 1964 British Open Championship was held at the Lansdowne Club in London from 25 November – 4 December 1963.
Roshan Khan seeded four pulled out of the main draw with an elbow injury to be replaced by lucky loser Sami Nadim. Abdelfattah Abou Taleb defeated Mike Oddy in the final. Aftab Jawaid won the third place play off by beating defending champion Mo Khan 9-6 5-9 5-9 10-8 9-1.

== Seeds ==
1. (Pakistan) Mo Khan
2. (United Arab Republic) Abdelfattah Abou Taleb
3. (Australia) Ken Hiscoe
4. (Pakistan) Roshan Khan

== Draw and results ==
=== First qualifying round ===
(United Arab Republic) Sherif Afifi beat (England) Peter Fuente w/o
(England) John Skinner beat (England) Terry Pickering 3-9 9-1 9-10 9-3 9-1
(England) Arthur Catherine beat (England) Henry Macintosh 4-9 6-9 9-7 9-4 9-7
(England) Richard Hawkey beat (England) John Mocatte 9-5 9-3 9-4
(United Arab Republic) Maged Abaza beat (Australia) Ken Watson 2-9 9-6 9-1 9-0
(United Arab Republic) Samir Nadim beat (Scotland) George Chisholm 9-6 9-5 10-9
(England) Jeremy Lyon beat (England) Tony Gathercole 6-9 9-1 9-3 9-4
(United Arab Republic) Aly Abdel Aziz beat (England) Pat Kirton 9-0 9-3 9-1
(England) Mike Corby beat (Pakistan) Sharif Khan 9-5 9-7 9-3

=== Second qualifying round ===
(England) Lyon beat (United Arab Republic) Nadim 9-1 1-9 5-9 10-9 10-8
(England) Catherine beat (England) Richard Hawkey 9-7 9-3 5-9 5-9 9-5
(England) Gerald Massy beat (United Arab Republic) Abaza 9-3 9-0 9-1
(England) Skinner beat (United Arab Republic) Afifi 9-5 9-0 10-9
(United Arab Republic) Aziz beat (England) Corby 9-6 9-1 4-9 9-6

=== Main draw ===
First round
1	(Pakistan) Mo Khan	9	9	9
(England) Gerald Massy	7	4	3
(United Arab Republic) Tewfik Shafik	9	9	9
(England) John Skinner	2	0	3
(Scotland) Mike Oddy	9	9	9
(United Arab Republic) Aly Abdel Aziz	3	1	4
(United Arab Republic) Kamal Zaghloul	1	9	5	9	9
3	(Australia) Ken Hiscoe	9	5	9	5	5
2	(United Arab Republic) Abdelfattah Abou Taleb	9	10	9
(England) Jeremy Lyon	7	8	2
(England) Arthur Catherine	0	2	8
(United Arab Republic) Ibrahim Amin	9	9	10
(Wales) Denis Hughes	2	9	7	1
(Pakistan) Aftab Jawaid	9	5	9	9
(Pakistan) Muhammad Yasin	9	9	9
(United Arab Republic) Samir Nadim	2	4	0

Quarter-finals
1	(Pakistan) Mo Khan	9	4	9	9
(United Arab Republic) Shafik	1	9	5	5
(Scotland) Oddy	9	9	9
(United Arab Republic) Zaghloul	5	5	3
2	(United Arab Republic) Taleb	9	9	9
(United Arab Republic) Amin	3	2	0
(Pakistan) Jawaid	10	9	7	10
(Pakistan) Yasin	9	6	9	8

Semi-finals
1	(Pakistan) Mo Khan	1	6	2
(Scotland) Oddy	9	9	9
2	(United Arab Republic) Taleb	9	9	9
(Pakistan) Jawaid	3	7	1

Final
(Scotland) Oddy	3	7	0
2	(United Arab Republic) Taleb	9	9	9

Preceded by 1963	British Open Squash Championships; England (London); 1964	Succeeded by 1965
