= Spain national squash team =

Spain national squash team may refer to:

- Spain men's national squash team
- Spain women's national squash team
