= 1974 European Squash Team Championships =

Squash tournament

- 2nd
- Location: (Sweden) Stockholm
- Date: 26 – 30 April 1974
- Website europeansquash.com

Results
- Champions: Men England

The 1974 European Squash Team Championships was the 2nd edition of European Squash Team Championships for squash players. The event was held in Stockholm, Sweden, from 26 to 30 April 1974. The tournament was organised by the European Squash Rackets Federation (ESRF).

The England men's team won their 2nd title.

== Men's tournament ==
=== Group stage ===
Pool A

Pos	Team	P	W	L	Pts
1	England	5	5	0	10
2	Wales	5	4	1	8
3	Denmark	5	3	2	6
4	Finland	5	2	3	4
5	Switzerland	4	0	4	0
6	Belgium	4	0	4	0

Pool B

Pos	Team	P	W	L	Pts
1	Scotland	5	5	0	10
2	(Republic of Ireland) Ireland	5	4	1	8
3	Greece	3	1	2	2
4	Netherlands	3	1	2	2
5	Sweden	2	0	2	0
6	Germany	4	0	4	0

=== Third place ===
Ireland
5
Third place

Wales
0

			1	2	3	4	5
1	(Republic of Ireland) (Wales)	John Magrath; Robert Dolman	w/o scr
2	(Republic of Ireland) (Wales)	Bob Weir; James Beattie	9; 5	9; 6	10; 9
3	(Republic of Ireland) (Wales)	Bernard O'Gorman; Mike Griffiths	9; 6	9; 2	0; 9	1; 9	9; 2
4	(Republic of Ireland) (Wales)	Ben Cranwell; Ian Carlisle	9; 4	9; 6	9; 6
5	(Republic of Ireland) (Wales)	Donald Byrne; Willie de Lloyd	9; 4	3; 9	7; 9	9; 7	9; 5

=== Final ===
England
5
Final

Scotland
0

			1	2	3	4	5
1	(England) (Scotland)	Peter Verow; Kim Bruce-Lockhart
2	(England) (Scotland)	Paul Millman; Robin Chalmers
3	(England) (Scotland)	Michael Thurgur; Neal Martin
4	(England) (Scotland)	Philip Ayton; Peter Marshall
5	(England) (Scotland)	Ian Nuttall; Duncan Smith
