= 1971 Men's British Open Squash Championship =

British Open Squash Championships
- 33rd British Open Championships

Details
- Location: Birmingham, England
- Venue: Edgbaston Priory Club

The 1971 British Open Championship was held at the Edgbaston Priory Club in Birmingham from 4–12 December 1969.
Jonah Barrington won his fourth title defeating Aftab Jawaid in the final.

== Seeds ==
1. (Republic of Ireland) Jonah Barrington
2. (Pakistan) Aftab Jawaid
3. (Pakistan) Mohammed Yasin
4. (England) Philip Ayton
5. (Pakistan) Sharif Khan
6. (Australia) Rainer Ratinac
7. (England) John Easter
8. (Egypt) Abdelfattah Abou Taleb

== Draw and results ==
=== Main draw ===
Second round
1	(Republic of Ireland) Jonah Barrington	9	9	9
(England) Clive Francis	0	0	2
(Rhodesia) Mike Hepker	9	9	9
(Pakistan) Khan Din	4	0	1
5	(Pakistan) Sharif Khan	9	10	9
(England) Mike Thurgur	0	9	4
4	(England) Philip Ayton	9	9	9
(Scotland) Kim Bruce-Lockhart	5	6	5
2	(Pakistan) Aftab Jawaid	9	9	9
(Pakistan) Hiddy Jahan	2	3	2
7	(England) John Easter	9	9	9
(Egypt) Ahmed Nadi	2	0	7
3	(Pakistan) Mo Yasin	9	9	9
(South Africa) Graham Macdonald	3	5	6
6	(Australia) Rainer Ratinac	9	9	6	9
(Australia) Billy Reedman	4	7	9	2

Quarter-finals
1	(Republic of Ireland) Barrington
(Rhodesia) Hepker
5	(Pakistan) Khan S
4	(England) Ayton
2	(Pakistan) Jawaid	9	10	9
7	(England) Easter	4	9	6
3	(Pakistan) Yasin	2	9	9	3	9
6	(Australia) Ratinac	9	5	3	9	5

Semi-finals
1	(Republic of Ireland) Barrington	9	9	3	9
5	(Pakistan) Khan	0	7	9	3
2	(Pakistan) Jawaid
3	(Pakistan) Yasin

Final
1	(Republic of Ireland) Barrington	9	9	9
2	(Pakistan) Jawaid	1	2	6

Eighth Seed Abdelfattah Abou Taleb withdrew against Mike Hepker in the first round.

Preceded by 1970	British Open Squash Championships; England (London); 1971	Succeeded by 1972
