= Michael Corby =

Michael Corby or Mike Corby may refer to:

- Michael Corby (musician), former member of the band The Babys
- Michael Corby (field hockey) (born 1940), international field hockey and squash player
