= Ireland national squash team =

Ireland national squash team may refer to:

- Ireland men's national squash team
- Ireland women's national squash team
