= 1976 European Squash Team Championships =

Squash tournament

- 4th
- Location: (Belgium) Brussels
- Date: 7 – 11 April 1976
- Website europeansquash.com

Results
- Champions: Men England

The 1976 European Squash Team Championships, sponsored by Pilkington Glass, was the 4th edition of European Squash Team Championships for squash players. The event was held in Brussels, Belgium, from 7 to 11 April 1976. The tournament was organised by the European Squash Rackets Federation (ESRF).

The England men's team won their 4th title.

== Men's tournament ==
=== Group stage ===
Pool A

Pos	Team	P	W	L	Pts
1	England	3	3	0	6
2	Netherlands	3	2	1	4
3	France	3	1	2	2
4	Greece	3	0	3	0

Pool B

Pos	Team	P	W	L	Pts
1	Scotland	3	3	0	6
2	Denmark	3	2	1	4
3	Belgium	3	1	2	2
4	Monaco	3	0	3	0

Pool C

Pos	Team	P	W	L	Pts
1	Sweden	3	3	0	6
2	Finland	3	2	1	4
3	Germany	3	1	2	2
4	Luxembourg	3	0	3	0

Pool D

Pos	Team	P	W	L	Pts
1	(Republic of Ireland) Ireland	2	2	0	4
2	Wales	2	1	1	2
3	Switzerland	2	0	2	0

=== Semi-finals ===
Team 1	Team 2	Score
England	(Republic of Ireland) Ireland	5-0
Scotland	Sweden	4-1

=== Third place ===
Sweden
5
Third place

Ireland
0

			1	2	3	4	5
1	(Sweden) (Republic of Ireland)	? David Gotto
2	(Sweden) (Republic of Ireland)	? Ben Cranwell
3	(Sweden) (Republic of Ireland)	? Bernard O'Gorman
4	(Sweden) (Republic of Ireland)	? John Magrath
5	(Sweden) (Republic of Ireland)	? Bob Weir

=== Final ===
England
5
Final

Scotland
0

			1	2	3	4	5
1	(England) (Scotland)	Ian Robinson; Kim Bruce-Lockhart	10; 9	9; 1	7; 9	9; 2
2	(England) (Scotland)	Jonathan Leslie; Neal Martin	9; 4	10; 8	9; 7
3	(England) (Scotland)	Peter Verow; Chris Wilson	9; 6	9; 5	10; 8
4	(England) (Scotland)	Phil Kenyon; Neil Stewart	9; 5	9; 5	10; 8
5	(England) (Scotland)	Paul Millman; Peter Wilson	9; 2	9; 5	9; 4
