= Squash Australia =

Governing body for squash in Australia

- Sport: Squash
- Founded: 1934
- Location: Milton, Queensland
- CEO: Robert Donaghue

Official website
- www.squashaus.com.au
- (Australia)

Squash Australia is the national organisation for squash in Australia, as recognised by the Professional Squash Association and the World Squash Federation. It organises and/or oversees many professional tournaments each year, along with many other official squash events.

In 1913 at the Melbourne Club in Victoria, the first Squash courts were established. It was founded in 1934 as the Squash Rackets Association of Australia (SRAA).

Australia hosted the inaugural World Squash Team Championships in 1967 and won the first four editions from 1967 to 1973.

In 2018 Squash Australia opened a new six-court centre at Carrara on the Gold Coast. The centre, now known as the National Squash Centre, hosted the 2019 World Doubles Championships, where Australia won 8 medals. The National Squash Centre will also host the 2021 World Doubles Championships.

Robert Donaghue has been the CEO of Squash Australia since 25 January 2021.

== See also ==
- Squash in Australia
- Australia men's national squash team
- Australia women's national squash team
