= Squash in Australia =

- Country: Australia
- Governing body: Squash Australia
- National team(s): Australia men's national squash team Australia women's national squash team

Squash is a popular sport in Australia. There is a long tradition of the sport in the country, which boasts 7 former world number one players. As of 2018 there are many highly ranked Australian players, both in men's and women's squash.

== History of squash in Australia ==
The first Squash courts in Australia were established in 1913 at the Melbourne Club in Victoria. Players such as Geoff Hunt, Heather McKay and Sarah Fitz-Gerald are regarded as Australian squash legends.

== Professional competitions ==
Many professional squash competitions take place in Australia each year. For example, the 2017 PSA World Tour included:

- the Sandgate Open in Brisbane
- the Elanora Open in Sydney
- the NT Open in Darwin
- the Golden Open in Kalgoorlie
- the Tasmanian Open in Devonport
- the South Australian Open in Adelaide
- the Victorian Open in Melbourne
- the Bendigo International Squash Open in Bendigo
- the City of Greater Shepparton International in Shepparton
- the Bega Open in Bega
- the North Coast Open in Coffs Harbour
- the New South Wales Open in Thornleigh
- the Queensland Open in the Gold Coast
- the Cairns Squash International in Cairns
- the Australian Open in Darwin

== Top players ==
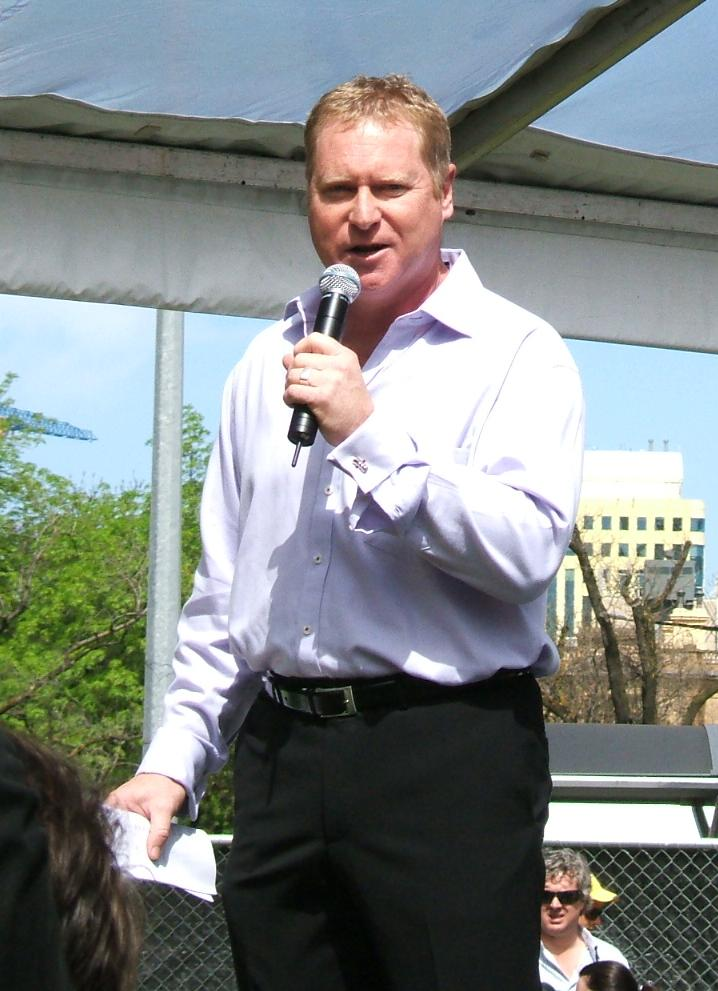
Former world number one Chris Dittmar

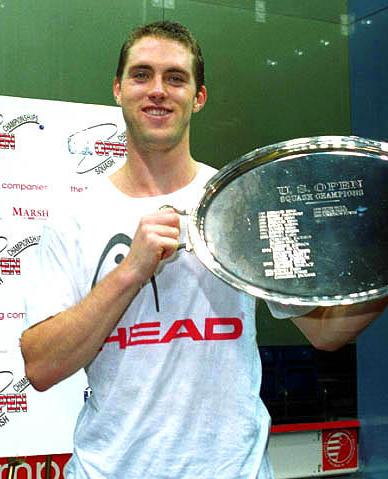
Former world number one David Palmer

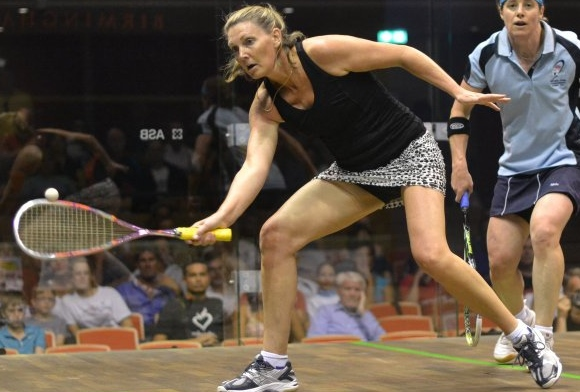
Former world number one Michelle Martin

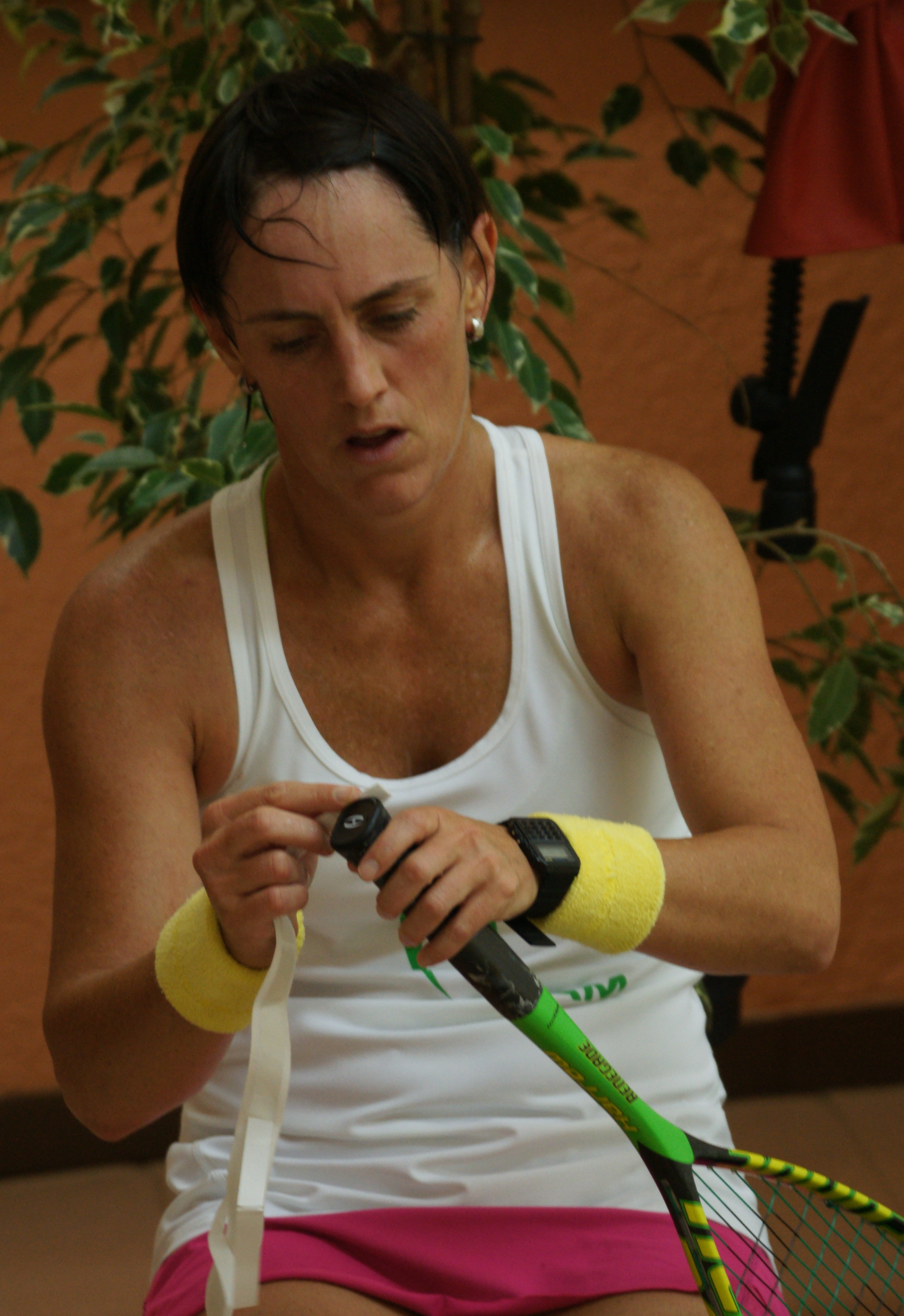
Former world number one Rachael Grinham

=== World number ones ===
Australia has produced several world number ones:

- Men:
  - Geoff Hunt
  - Chris Dittmar
  - David Palmer
- Women:
  - Vicki Cardwell
  - Michelle Martin
  - Sarah Fitz-Gerald
  - Rachael Grinham

=== Highest ranked players ===
As of April 2018, the highest ranked Australian squash players were:

- Men:
  - Ryan Cuskelly (15)
  - Cameron Pilley (20)
  - Rex Hedrick (65)
  - Joshua Larkin (69)
  - Rhys Dowling (98)
- Women:
  - Donna Urquhart (16)
  - Rachael Grinham (26)
  - Christine Nunn (55)
  - Sarah Cardwell (56)
  - Tamika Saxby (57)

== National teams ==
Australia has national men's and women's teams, that represent the country in international competitions.

== Commonwealth Games ==
Australian players compete in the squash events of the Commonwealth Games, which are held every 4 years. Most recently, in the 2018 games, Australian players Zac Alexander and David Palmer won gold in the men's doubles event, Donna Urquhart and Cameron Pilley won gold in the mixed doubles event, and Donna Urquhart and Donna Urquhart won bronze in the women's doubles event.

== Governance ==
Squash in Australia is governed by Squash Australia.

== See also ==
- Sport in Australia
