= Squash Ireland =

Governing body for squash on the island of Ireland

- Sport: Squash
- Founded: 1935
- Regional affiliation: European Squash Federation
- Location: Dublin, Ireland

Official website
- www.squashireland.ie
- (Republic of Ireland)

Squash Ireland is the governing body for the sport of squash in the Republic of Ireland and Northern Ireland. Founded in 1935 as the Irish Squash Rackets Association, H.J. Ryan was elected as its first honorary secretary and Sir Basil Goudling was the first honorary treasurer. The organisation later became known as the Irish Squash Federation and Irish Squash before rebranding as Squash Ireland in 2024.

It is recognised by Sport Ireland as the governing body for squash in Ireland, and is also a member of the World Squash Federation (WSF) and European Squash Federation (ESF).

Squash Ireland organises the annual Irish National Squash Championships, which began in 1972.

== See also ==
- Ireland men's national squash team
- Ireland women's national squash team
- Squash in Ireland
