= Spain women's national squash team =

Spain
- Coach: Paloma Gonzalez
- Association: Spanish Squash Federation
- Colors: Red

World Team Championships
- First year: 1989
- Titles: 0
- Runners-up: 0
- Best finish: 13th
- Entries: 11

The Spain women's national squash team represents Spain in international squash team competitions, and is governed by the Real Federación Española de Squash.

== Current team ==
- Xisela Aranda Núñez
- Cristina Gómez
- Marta Latorre Ramirez
- Marina De Juan Gallach

== Results ==
=== World Team Squash Championships ===
Year	Result	Position	W	L
(England) Birmingham 1979	Did not present			
(Canada) Toronto 1981	Did not present			
(Australia) Perth 1983	Did not present			
(Republic of Ireland) Dublin 1985	Did not present			
(New Zealand) Auckland 1987	Did not present			
(Netherlands) Warmond 1989	Group Stage	14th	1	3
(Australia) Sydney 1990	Group Stage	17th	2	4
(Canada) Vancouver 1992	Did not present			
(England) Guernsey 1994	Group Stage	20th	3	2
(Malaysia) Petaling Jaya 1996	Group Stage	13th	4	2
(Germany) Stuttgart 1998	Group Stage	15th	1	5
(England) Sheffield 2000	Group Stage	17th	4	2
(Denmark) Odense 2002	Group Stage	14th	2	5
(Netherlands) Amsterdam 2004	Did not present			
(Canada) Edmonton 2006	Group Stage	15th	1	5
(Egypt) Cairo 2008	Group Stage	16th	1	6
(New Zealand) Palmerston North 2010	Did not present			
(France) Nîmes 2012	Group Stage	23rd	3	5
(Canada) Niagara-on-the-Lake 2014	Group Stage	17th	3	5
(France) Issy-les-Moulineaux 2016	Group Stage	13th	2	4
Total	12/20	0 Title	27	48

== See also ==
- Spanish Squash Federation
- Spain men's national squash team
- World Team Squash Championships
