= Ireland men's national squash team =

Ireland
- Coach: Arthur Gaskin
- Association: Irish Squash Federation
- Colors: Green & White

World Team Championships
- First year: 1979
- Titles: 0
- Runners-up: 0
- Best finish: 10th
- Entries: 20

European Team Championships
- Titles: 0
- Runners-up: 0
- Best finish: 3rd

The Ireland men's national squash team represents Ireland in international squash team competitions, and is governed by Irish Squash Federation.

Since 1979, Ireland has participated in four round of 16 of the World Squash Team Open.

== Current team (2026) ==
Squad for European Squash Team Championships Division 2
Name	World Ranking	Age	Height
Michael Creaven	Ranked 299th	25	194cm
Conor Moran	Ranked 163rd	25	180cm
Oisin Logan	Ranked 427th	30	185cm
Sean Conroy	Ranking —	32	177cm

European Squash Team Championships Division 2 Results

Group Games

- 4-0 win vs Slovakia
- 4-0 win vs Norway
- 4-0 win vs Austria

Knockout Games

- Semi Final 4-0 win vs Sweden
- Final 4-0 win vs Israel

== Olympic Games ==
Ireland plans to send a Squash team to the 2028 Olympic Games in Los Angeles, Sam Buckley was Ireland's Highest ranked player ranked 93rd in the World Rankings.

== Results ==
=== World Team Squash Championships ===
Year	Result	Position	W	L
(Australia) Melbourne 1967	Did not present			
(England) Birmingham 1969	Did not present			
(New Zealand) Palmerston North 1971	Did not present			
(South Africa) Johannesburg 1973	Did not present			
(England) Birmingham 1976	Did not present			
(Canada) Toronto 1977	Did not present			
(Australia) Brisbane 1979	Group Stage	10th	2	7
(Sweden) Stockholm 1981	Group Stage	13th	4	3
(New Zealand) Auckland 1983	Group Stage	10th	6	3
(Egypt) Cairo 1985	Group Stage	13th	4	5
(England) London 1987	Group Stage	15th	3	5
Singapore 1989	Group Stage	11th	7	1
(Finland) Helsinki 1991	Group Stage	12th	2	4
(Pakistan) Karachi 1993	Group Stage	10th	3	3
(Egypt) Cairo 1995	Group Stage	15th	3	3
(Malaysia) Petaling Jaya 1997	Group Stage	16th	3	3
(Egypt) Cairo 1999	Group Stage	13th	5	1
(Australia) Melbourne 2001	Round of 16	10th	4	3
(Austria) Vienna 2003	Round of 16	12th	3	4
(Pakistan) Islamabad 2005	Group Stage	19th	1	4
(India) Chennai 2007	Round of 16	12th	2	4
(Denmark) Odense 2009	Round of 16	16th	1	5
(Germany) Paderborn 2011	Group Stage	19th	2	5
(France) Mulhouse 2013	Group Stage	23rd	3	4
(Egypt) Cairo 2015	Cancelled			
(France) Marseille 2017	Group Stage	20th	1	4
(United States) Washington, D.C. 2019	Group Stage	17th	3	3
Total	20/26	0 Title	62	74

=== European Squash Team Championships ===
Year	Result	Position
(Scotland) Edinburgh 1973	Semi Final	3rd
(Sweden) Stockholm 1974	Semi Final	3rd
(Republic of Ireland) Dublin 1975	Semi Final	4th
(Belgium) Brussels 1976	Semi Final	4th
(England) Sheffield 1977	Semi Final	4th
(Netherlands) Amsterdam 1978	Not in the Top 4	
(Germany) Hamburg 1979	Semi Final	4th
(Finland) Helsinki 1980	Not in the Top 4	
(Netherlands) Amsterdam 1981	Semi Final	3rd
(Wales) Cardiff 1982	Semi Final	3rd
(Germany) Munich 1983	Not in the Top 4	
(Republic of Ireland) Dublin 1984	Semi Final	4th
(Spain) Barcelona 1985	Not in the Top 4	
(France) Aix-en-Provence 1986	Not in the Top 4	
(Austria) Vienna 1987	Not in the Top 4	
(Netherlands) Warmond 1988	Not in the Top 4	
(Finland) Helsinki 1989	Not in the Top 4	
(Switzerland) Zürich 1990	Not in the Top 4	
(Germany) Gelsenkirchen 1991	Not in the Top 4	
(France) Aix-en-Provence 1992	Not in the Top 4	
(France) Aix-en-Provence 1993	Not in the Top 4	
(Germany) Zoetermeer 1994	Not in the Top 4	
(Netherlands) Amsterdam 1995	Not in the Top 4	
(Netherlands) Amsterdam 1996	Not in the Top 4	
(Denmark) Odense 1997	Not in the Top 4	
(Finland) Helsinki 1998	Not in the Top 4	
(Austria) Linz 1999	Not in the Top 4	
(Austria) Vienna 2000	Not in the Top 4	
(Netherlands) Eindhoven 2001	Not in the Top 4	
(Germany) Böblingen 2002	Not in the Top 4	
(England) Nottingham 2003	Not in the Top 4	
(France) Rennes 2004	Not in the Top 4	
(Netherlands) Amsterdam 2005	Not in the Top 4	
(Austria) Vienna 2006	Not in the Top 4	
(Italy) Riccione 2007	Not in the Top 4	
(Netherlands) Amsterdam 2008	Not in the Top 4	
(Sweden) Malmö 2009	Not in the Top 4	
(France) Aix-en-Provence 2010	Not in the Top 4	
(Finland) Espoo 2011	Not in the Top 4	
(Germany) Nuremberg 2012	Not in the Top 4	
(Netherlands) Amsterdam 2013	Not in the Top 4	
(Italy) Riccione 2014	Not in the Top 4	
(Denmark) Herning 2015	Not in the Top 4	
(Poland) Warsaw 2016	Not in the Top 4	
(Finland) Helsinki 2017	Not in the Top 4	
(Poland) Wrocław 2018	Not in the Top 4	
(England) Birmingham 2019	Not in the Top 4	
Total	x4	

== See also ==
- Squash Ireland
- World Team Squash Championships
- Ireland women's national squash team
