= Spanish Squash Federation =

Sports governing body in Spain

Real Federación Española de Squash
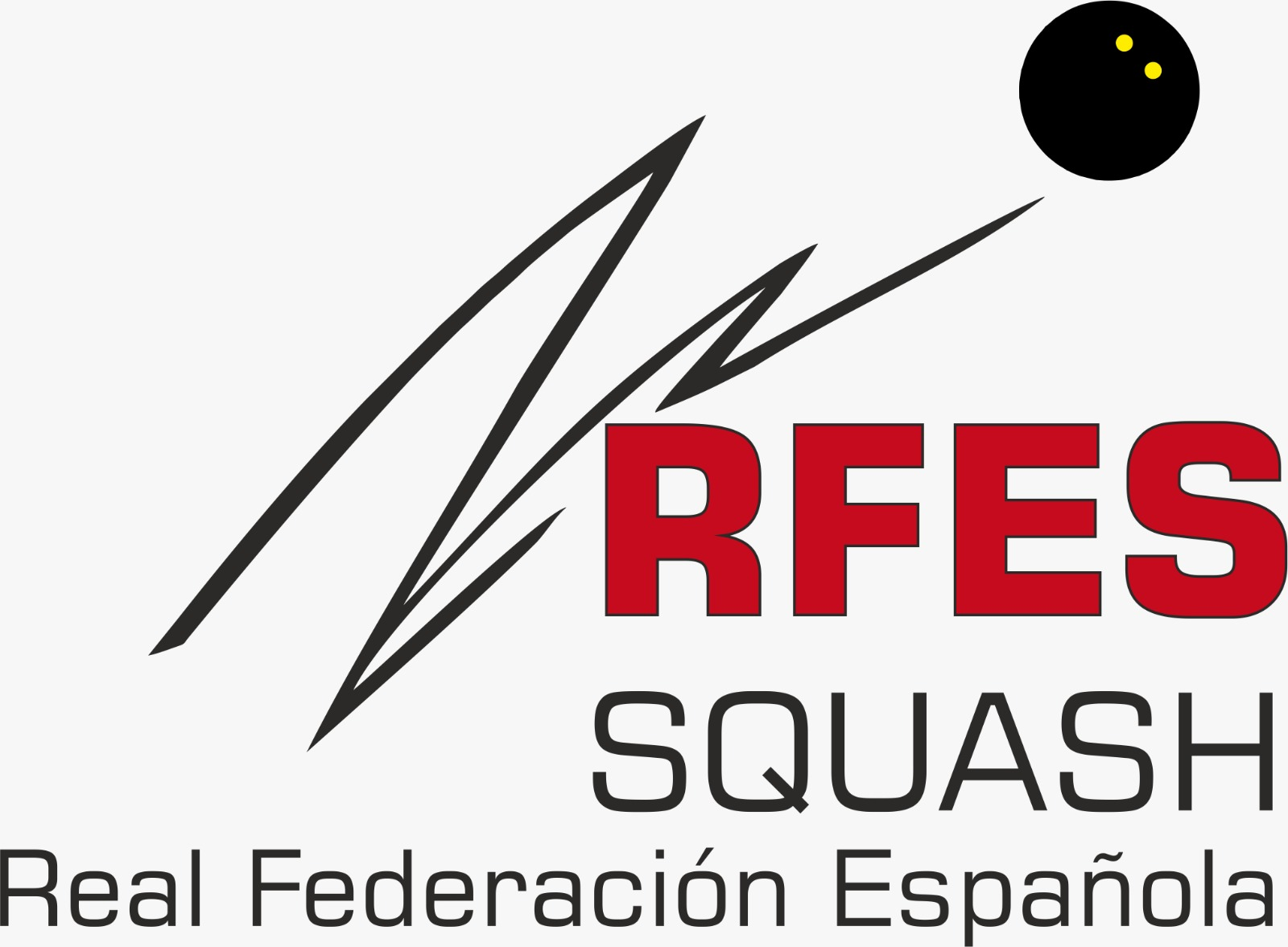
- Sport: Squash
- Founded: 1978
- Regional affiliation: European Squash Federation
- Location: Madrid
- President: José Luis Orizaola Paz
- Men's coach: Borja Golán
- Women's coach: Margaux Pitarch

Official website
- www.realfederaciondesquash.com
- (Spain)

The Royal Spanish Squash Federation (Real Federación Española de Squash, RFES) is the national governing body of squash in Spain. Established in 1983, it oversees the development, regulation and promotion of squash at amateur and professional levels throughout the country. It is a member of the European Squash Federation (ESF) and is recognised by the World Squash Federation and the Spanish government as the authoritative body for squash in Spain. The organisation is responsible for the Spanish national teams at all age levels (from U11s to Masters). The federation's headquarter is located in Madrid.

== See also ==
- Spain men's national squash team
- Spain women's national squash team
