= Paul Millman =

English squash player (born 1946)

Personal information
- Born: June 1946 (age 80) Cheltenham, England

Sport
- Country: England
Medal record
Men's squash
Representing Great Britain
World Team Championships
| Silver medal – second place | 1969 Midlands | Team |
| Silver medal – second place | 1971 Auckland | Team |
Representing England
European Team Championships
| Gold medal – first place | 1973 Edinburgh | Team |
| Gold medal – first place | 1974 Stockholm | Team |
| Gold medal – first place | 1976 Brussels | Team |

Paul Edward Millman (born June 1946) is an English former squash player. He was twice a world team runner-up and three time European team champion.

== Biography ==
Millman was born in Cheltenham and won the 1963 South of England junior Championship as a junior. He was taken under coaching by Jonah Barrington.

He represented Gloucestershire at county level and soon became the number ranked player in the county. He was subsequently selected to represent Great Britain, achieving his finest success to date, which came at the 1969 Men's World Team Squash Championships, when he helped Great Britain win the silver medal with Jonah Barrington, Mike Corby and Don Innes. He repeated the feat two years later at the 1971 Men's World Team Squash Championships but this time with Corby, John Easter and Philip Ayton.

Millman went on to win three gold medals for the England men's national squash team at the European Squash Team Championships in 1973, 1974 and 1977.

He reached the British number two ranking in 1972 and was regularly asked to play exhibitions during special events. He was a marketing executive by trade and during 1975 he set a record of 41 England Great Britain appearances, in addition to marrying a South African player from Western Province.
