= Australia women's national squash team =

Australia
- Coach: Michelle Martin
- Association: Squash Australia
- Colors: Green & Gold

World Team Championships
- First year: 1979
- Titles: 9 (2010-2004-2002-1998- 1996-1994-1992-1983-1981)
- Runners-up: 5
- Best finish: 1st
- Entries: 19

The Australia women's national squash team represents Australia in international squash team competitions, and is governed by Squash Australia.

Since 1979, Australia has won 9 World Squash Team Open titles. Their most recent title came in 2010.

== Current team 2024 ==
- Jessica Turnbull
- Alex Haydon
- Sarah Cardwell
- Madison Lyon

== Results ==
=== World Team Squash Championships ===
Year	Result	Position	W	L
(England) 1979	Final	2nd	3	1
(Canada) 1981	Champions	1st	7	0
(Australia) 1983	Champions	1st	6	0
(Republic of Ireland) 1985	Semi Final	3rd	5	2
(New Zealand) 1987	Final	2nd	7	1
(Netherlands) 1989	Final	2nd	5	1
(Australia) 1990	Final	2nd	4	1
(Canada) 1992	Champions	1st	6	0
(England) 1994	Champions	1st	5	0
(Malaysia) 1996	Champions	1st	6	0
(Germany) 1998	Champions	1st	6	0
(England) 2000	Final	2nd	6	1
(Denmark) 2002	Champions	1st	6	0
(Netherlands) 2004	Champions	1st	7	0
(Canada) 2006	Group Stage	10th	3	3
(Egypt) 2008	Quarter Final	6th	4	3
(New Zealand) 2010	Champions	1st	6	0
(France) 2012	Semi Final	4th	4	2
(Canada) 2014	Quarter Final	7th	4	3
(France) 2016	Quarter Final	8th	2	3
Total	20/20	9 Titles	102	21

== See also ==
- Squash Australia
- Squash in Australia
- World Team Squash Championships
- Australia men's national squash team
