= Italian Squash Federation =

Sports governing body in Italy

Federazione Italiana Giuoco Squash
- Sport: Squash
- Abbreviation: FIGS
- Founded: 1976
- Regional affiliation: European Squash Federation
- Location: Riccione
- President: Siro Zanella, Piero Bartoletti
- Secretary: Davide Monti
- Coach: Vinicio Menegozzi

Official website
- www.figs.it
- (Italy)

Italian Squash Federation ("Federazione Italiana Giuoco Squash" in Italian), also known as the FIGS, is an organisation set up in 1976 that takes charge of the organisation, co-ordination and promotion of squash in Italy.

== See also ==
- Italy men's national squash team
