= David Brazier =

English squash player

Personal information
- Born: July 1942 (age 83–84) Worthing, England

Sport
- Country: England
Medal record
Men's squash
Representing Great Britain
World Team Championships
Silver medal – second place	1967 Sydney	Team

David Richard Brazier (born July 1942) is an English former squash player. He was a world team silver medallist.

== Biography ==
Brazier was born in Worthing, the son of a John Brazier a prominent property business owner.

He was educated at Lancing College in West Sussex and as a junior won the Sussex Junior title in both 1958 and 1959. He subsequently won the South of England junior title during January 1960 and quickly followed up this success by winning the Drysdale Cup (the national junior title and described as the Junior Wimbledon Championships of squash).

Brazier represented Sussex at county level, became Sussex champion and played for Hove SRC at club level. In 1964, he took a stockbroker job with Hill Samuel in Bishopsgate.

He married Michele Moreton in May 1966 before achieving his finest sporting success which came at the 1967 Men's World Team Squash Championships, when he helped Great Britain win the silver medal with Jonah Barrington, Mike Corby and Peter Stokes.

After winning the county title for four successive years from 1964 to 1967, Brazier decided to concentrate on his stockbroking career.
