= Ian Nuttall =

English squash player

Personal information
- Born: 1947 England

Sport
- Country: England
Medal record
Men's squash
Representing England
European Team Championships
| Gold medal – first place | 1974 Stockholm | Team |
| Silver medal – second place | 1980 Helsinki | Team |

Ian Nuttall (born c.1947) is an English former professional squash player.

== Biography ==
Nuttall was the inaugural winner of the Lincolnshire Championships in 1970 and retained his title in 1971 and 1972. In October 1971, he switched county allegiance from Lincolnshire to Yorkshire.

He was selected to represented the England men's national squash team in Stockholm and helped them claim the 1974 European Squash Team Championships title.

By 1975 he was the number 6 in the British rankings and the Yorkshire number 1. In 1976, aged 29, he moved from St Olave's School in York to become a house tutor and a mathematics teacher at Clifton College Preparatory School in Bristol. He played for Ashton Court at club level. having previously played for York Squash Club.

He was recalled for England and won a silver medal at the 1980 European Squash Team Championships in Helsinki.
