= 1967 Men's World Team Squash Championships =

Squash event

Men's World Team 1967
- 1st World Men's Team Championship
- Location: Sydney, Australia
- Date: 9–15 August 1967

Results
- Champions: Australia
- Runners-up: Great Britain
- Third place: New Zealand

The 1967 Men's World Team Squash Championships was the inaugural edition of the tournament. It was held in Sydney, Australia, from 9 to 15 August 1967.

Australia won the inaugural championships. The defeated Great Britain in the round robin, which effectively sealed the gold medal. Great Britain took silver from New Zealand by virtue of having a better winning games percentage.

== Results ==
Team One	Team Two	Score
Australia	India	3-0
Great Britain	South Africa	2-1
New Zealand	South Africa	2-1
Australia	Pakistan	3-0
Australia	New Zealand	3-0
South Africa	India	3-0
Great Britain	India	3-0
Pakistan	New Zealand	2-1
New Zealand	India	2-1
South Africa	Pakistan	3-0
Australia	Great Britain	3-0
Great Britain	Pakistan	3-0
Australia	South Africa	3-0
New Zealand	Great Britain	2-1
India	Pakistan	2-1

Pos	Team	Players	P	W	L	Pts
1	Australia	(Geoff Hunt, Ken Hiscoe, Dick Carter, Cam Nancarrow)	5	5	0	10
2	Great Britain	(Peter Stokes, Jonah Barrington, Mike Corby, David Brazier)	5	3	2	6
3	New Zealand	(Charlie Waugh, Peter Dibley, Trevor Johnston, Don Burmeister)	5	3	2	6
4	South Africa	(Dawie Botha, Doug Barrow, Graham Macdonald)	5	2	3	4
5	India	(Anil Nayar, Sanjit Roy, Fali Madon, Dinshaw Firoze Pandole)	5	1	4	2
6	Pakistan	(Muhammad Saleen, Khalid Azim Mir, Ala-Ud-Din)	5	1	4	2

== See also ==
- World Team Squash Championships
- World Squash Federation
- World Open (squash)

Preceded by None	Squash World Team; Australia (Sydney); 1967	Succeeded by England (Birmingham) 1969
