= Don Innes =

English squash player (born 1941)

Personal information
- Born: 1941 (age 84–85)

Sport
- Country: England
Medal record
Men's squash
Representing Great Britain
World Team Championships
Silver medal – second place	1969 Midlands	Team

Don M. Innes (born 1941) is an English former squash player. He was a world team silver medallist.

== Biography ==
Innes served in the Royal Air Force as a Pilot Officer in 1965 and was stationed at RAF Cottesmore, while he played squash for Leicester SC at club level.

He played for Leicestershire at county level and had a significant rivalry with Peter Stokes at the RAF Championships being defeated by him in two consecutive finals.

Innes left the RAF in 1968 to seek a civil airline position. He subsequently received an England call up to play Ireland on 10 January 1969 and was selected to represent Great Britain, achieving his finest success, which came at the 1969 Men's World Team Squash Championships, when he helped Great Britain win the silver medal with Jonah Barrington, Mike Corby and Paul Millman.

Innes continued to represent Great Britain afterwards and reached a ranking of No.3 in Britain.
