= Mike Oddy =

Scottish squash player (1937–2016)

Personal information
- Nationality: British (Scottish)
- Born: 18 March 1937 Hawick, Scotland
- Died: 19 November 2016 (aged 79) Bicester, Oxfordshire, England

Sport
Medal record
British Amateur Championships
Silver medal – second place	1960/1961	singles
Silver medal – second place	1962/1962	singles

Michael Oddy (18 March 1937 – 19 November 2016) was a squash player from Scotland. He was one of the game's leading players in the 1960s and was twice winne rof the British Amateur Squash Championships.

== Biography ==
He was born in Hawick, Scotland and after Rugby School joined Ballantyne Knitwear, which became part of Baird Plc. He moved to Leicester to take up the role of managing director of Pantherella Fine English Socks, taking the business public onto the USM and then through its sale to Great Universal Stores (GUS Plc) before retiring.

He played in an era where the sport was dominated by great players from Pakistan (such as Azam Khan, Roshan Khan, Mo Khan and Aftab Jawaid) and Egypt (such as A.A. AbouTaleb and Ibrahim Amin).

Oddy was one of the few British players to provide as consistent challenge to the dominant Asian and African players of his era. He was runner-up to A.A. AbouTaleb at the 1964 British Open (which was considered to be effective world championship of the sport at the time), and won the British Amateur Championship during the 1960/61 and 1961/62 seasons.

He had a lifelong passion for flat racing, never missing a King George race day at Ascot for 59 years. He was delighted when through his membership of the Royal Ascot Racing Club he had a share in the Derby Winner Motivator in 2005.

Mike died on 19 November 2016.
