= 1971 Men's World Team Squash Championships =

Squash event

Men's World Team 1971
- 3rd World Men's Team Championship
- Location: New Zealand
- Date: 6–16 August 1971

Results
- Champions: Australia
- Runners-up: (United Kingdom) Great Britain
- Third place: Pakistan

The 1971 Men's World Team Amateur Squash Championships were the third edition of that tournament. It was held in Palmerston North, Henderson and Auckland, New Zealand, from 6 to 16 August 1971.

Australia became champions for the third consecutive time, and England were the runners-up, also for the third time in a row. Pakistan finished in third place, as they had in the previous edition in 1969.

== Results ==
Venue	Team One	Team Two	Score
North Palmerston	(United Kingdom) Great Britain	Pakistan	3-0
North Palmerston	India	Canada	2-1
North Palmerston	Egypt	New Zealand	2-1
North Palmerston	Australia	(United Kingdom) Great Britain	3-0
North Palmerston	Pakistan	Canada	3-0
North Palmerston	New Zealand	India	2-1
Auckland	Australia	Pakistan	2-1
Auckland	Egypt	Canada	3-0
Auckland	(United Kingdom) Great Britain	India	3-0
Auckland	(United Kingdom) Great Britain	Canada	3-0
Auckland	Australia	New Zealand	3-0
Auckland	Pakistan	Egypt	2-1
Auckland	(United Kingdom) Great Britain	New Zealand	3-0
Auckland	Australia	Egypt	3-0
Auckland	Pakistan	India	3-0
Henderson	Australia	India	3-0
Henderson	Egypt	(United Kingdom) Great Britain	2-1
Henderson	New Zealand	Canada	3-0
Auckland	Australia	Canada	3-0
Auckland	Egypt	India	3-0
Auckland	Pakistan	New Zealand	3-0

Pos	Team	Players	P	W	L	F	A	Pts
1	Australia	(Geoff Hunt, Ken Hiscoe, Dick Carter, Cam Nancarrow)	6	6	0	17	1	12
2	(United Kingdom) Great Britain	(John Easter, Mike Corby, Philip Ayton, Paul Millman)	6	4	2	13	5	8
3	Pakistan	(Aftab Jawaid, Torsam Khan, Mohamed Saleem)	6	4	2	12	6	8
4	Egypt	(Abbas Kaoud, Mohamed Asran, Galal Allam)	6	4	2	11	7	8
5	New Zealand	(Laurie Green, Trevor Johnston, Don Burmeister, Charlie Waugh)	6	2	4	6	12	4
6	India	(Vijay Paul, Sanjit Roy, Ali Ispahani, P Handa)	6	1	5	3	15	2
7	Canada	(Steve Moysey, Peter Martin, Gordon Anderson, Colin Adair)	6	0	6	1	17	0

== See also ==
- World Team Squash Championships
- World Squash Federation
- World Open (squash)

Preceded by England (The Midlands); 1969	Squash World Team; New Zealand; 1971	Succeeded by South Africa (Johannesburg); 1973
