= 1973 Men's World Team Squash Championships =

Squash event

Men's World Team 1973
- 4th World Men's Team Championship
- Location: Johannesburg, South Africa
- Date: 16-26 August 1973

Results
- Champions: Australia
- Runners-up: (United Kingdom) Great Britain
- Third place: South Africa

The 1973 Men's World Team Amateur Squash Championships were held in Johannesburg, South Africa, from 16 to 26 August 1973. Australia became the champions, and Great Britain the runners-up, for the fourth consecutive time.

== Results ==
Team One	Team Two	Score
Australia	United States	3-0
South Africa	New Zealand	3-0
(United Kingdom) Great Britain	International SRA Invitation Team	3-0
Australia	(United Kingdom) Great Britain	2-1
New Zealand	United States	3-0
South Africa	International SRA Invitation Team	?-?
(United Kingdom) Great Britain	United States	3-0
(United Kingdom) Great Britain	New Zealand	2-1
South Africa	(New Zealand) United States	3-0
Australia	International SRA Invitation Team	?-?
Australia	South Africa	2-1
South Africa	New Zealand	3-0
New Zealand	International SRA Invitation Team	1-2
Australia	New Zealand	3-0
(United Kingdom) Great Britain	South Africa	2-1
United States	International SRA Invitation Team	?-?

Pos	Team	Players	P	W	L	Pts
1	Australia	Mike Donnelly, Dave Wright, Lionel Robberds, Cam Nancarrow	5	5	0	10
2	(United Kingdom) Great Britain	John Easter, Stuart Courtney, Philip Ayton, Bryan Patterson	5	4	1	8
3	South Africa	Doug Barrow, Roland Watson, Steve Sherren	5	3	2	6
4	International SRA Invitation Team	Robert Anjema (Ned), Billy Reedman (Aus), Don Burmeister (Nzl)	5	2	3	4
5	New Zealand	Laurie Green, Shane O'Dwyer, Neven Barbour, John Stevens	5	1	4	2
6	United States	Frank Satterthwaite, Dinny Adams, Jay Nelson, Thomas Poor	5	0	5	0

== See also ==
- World Open (squash)
- World Squash Federation
- World Team Squash Championships

Preceded by New Zealand; 1971	Squash World Team (Johannesburg) South Africa; 1973	Succeeded by England (The Midlands); 1976
