= 1969 Men's World Team Squash Championships =

Squash event

Men's World Team 1969
- 2nd World Men's Team Championship
- Location: The Midlands, England
- Date: 3–12 February 1969

Results
- Champions: Australia
- Runners-up: (United Kingdom) Great Britain
- Third place: Pakistan

The 1969 Men's World Team Squash Championships was the second edition of the tournament. It was held in The Midlands, England, from 3 to 12 February 1969.

Australia retained the title after beating Great Britain 2–1 in the deciding round-robin match.

== Results ==
| Venue | Team One | Team Two | Score |
|---|---|---|---|
| Edgbaston Priory | Australia | South Africa | 2-1 |
| Wolverhampton | Pakistan | New Zealand | 2-1 |
| Leicester | New Zealand | South Africa | 1-2 |
| Coventry | Australia | Pakistan | 2-1 |
| Malvern Hill | (United Kingdom) Great Britain | United Arab Republic | 2-1 |
| Handsworth | South Africa | United Arab Republic | 2-1 |
| Edgbaston Priory | (United Kingdom) Great Britain | New Zealand | 2-1 |
| Nottingham | Australia | New Zealand | 3-0 |
| Sutton Coldfield | (United Kingdom) Great Britain | South Africa | 3-0 |
| | United Arab Republic | Pakistan | 0-3 |
| | Australia | United Arab Republic | 3-0 |
| Nottingham | (United Kingdom) Great Britain | Pakistan | 2-1 |
| Edgbaston Priory | Australia | (United Kingdom) Great Britain | 2-1 |
| | New Zealand | United Arab Republic | 3-0 |
| | South Africa | Pakistan | 1-2 |

| Pos | Team | Players | P | W | L | Pts |
|---|---|---|---|---|---|---|
| 1 | Australia | (Geoff Hunt, Ken Hiscoe, Dick Carter, Cam Nancarrow) | 5 | 5 | 0 | 10 |
| 2 | (United Kingdom) Great Britain | (Jonah Barrington, Mike Corby, Paul Millman, Don Innes) | 5 | 4 | 1 | 8 |
| 3 | Pakistan | (Gogi Alauddin, Aftab Jawaid, Sajjad Muneer, Mohammad Saleem) | 5 | 3 | 2 | 6 |
| 4 | South Africa | (Dawie Botha, Doug Barrow, Graham Macdonald, Derek Broom) | 5 | 2 | 3 | 4 |
| 5 | New Zealand | (Peter Dibley, Trevor Johnston, Don Burmeister, John Isaccs) | 5 | 1 | 4 | 2 |
| 6 | United Arab Republic | (Sherif Afifi, Kamal Zaghloul, Ibrahim Amin, Galal Allam) | 5 | 0 | 5 | 0 |

== See also ==
- World Team Squash Championships
- World Squash Federation
- World Open (squash)

| Preceded by Australia (Sydney); 1967 | Squash World Team (The Midlands) England; 1969 | Succeeded by New Zealand; 1971 |
