= Stuart Courtney =

English squash player

Personal information
- Born: 8 April 1949 (age 77) Watford, England

Sport
- Country: England
- Handedness: left-handed
Medal record
Men's squash
Representing Great Britain
World Team Championships
Gold medal – first place	1976 Birmingham	Team
Representing England
European Team Championships
Gold medal – first place	1973 Edinburgh	Team

Stuart Hamilton Courtney (born 8 April 1949) is an English former professional squash player. He was a team world champion and reached a career high ranking of British number 1.

== Biography ==
Courtney born in Watford, England, attended the City of London School and represented Surrey at county level.

His finest success came at the 1976 Men's World Team Squash Championships, when he helped Great Britain become world champions with Jonathan Leslie, Philip Ayton and Ian Robinson.

Courtney was a member of the England men's national squash team that won the gold medal at the inaugural European Squash Team Championships in 1973.

Courtney was twice runner-up at the British National Squash Championships to Jonathan Leslie and Phil Ayton in 1974 and 1975 respectively.

He was the manager of the England team at the 1998 Commonwealth Games and acted as Chief Executive and later Secretary of England Squash from 1992 to 2001.
