= Peter Stokes (squash player) =

English squash player

Personal information
- Born: Q3. 1940 Cardiff, Wales

Sport
- Country: Wales
Medal record
Men's squash
Representing Great Britain
World Team Championships
Silver medal – second place	1967 Sydney	Team

Peter D. Stokes (born 1940) is a Welsh former squash player. He was a World team silver medallist.

== Biography ==
Stokes was born in Cardiff to a military family, the son of Group Captain Donald Stokes and Dorothy Nicholas. He attended Rossall School but lived in various locations due to the military postings of his father.

Stokes studied at Cambridge and was captain of the Cambridge University squash team in 1961 and 1962 and earned his blue. He also joined the Royal Air Force and was a Flying Officer, while at Cambridge. His younger brother Michael (born 1946) was also a notable squash player and followed his brother into the RAF.

Stokes decided to represented his birth country Wales at international level, despite spending very little time there. In 1965, he was selected for the Great Britain tour of South Africa.

In November 1967 and now a flight Lieutenant, he won a fourth consecutive RAF Championship titles to set a record. This was the same year that he achieved his finest success, which came at the 1967 Men's World Team Squash Championships, when he helped Great Britain win the silver medal with Jonah Barrington, Mike Corby and David Brazier.

By 1970 he was a squadron leader in the RAF and continued to represent Wales at squash until 1977.
