= Ibrahim Amin =

Egyptian squash player (died 2023)

Personal information
- Born: c.1933 Egypt
- Died: 5 October 2023 Egypt

Sport
Medal record
Men's squash
Representing Egypt
British Open Championships
Silver medal – second place	1965	singles
British Amateur Championships
Gold medal – first place	1955/1956	singles
Gold medal – first place	1959/1960	singles

Ibrahim Amin (Arabic: إبراهيم أمين; c.1933 – 5 October 2023) was an Egyptian squash player from Egypt who was twice winner of the British Amateur Squash Championships.

== Biography ==
Amin won the British Amateur Squash Championships during the 1955/1956 and 1959/1960 seasons.

In 1965, Amin was the British Open runner-up, losing 0–9, 9–0, 1–9, 6–9 in the final to fellow Egyptian player, A. A. AbouTaleb.

== Death ==
Ibrahim Amin died on 5 October 2023.
