= 1976 Men's World Team Squash Championships =

Squash event

Men's World Team 1976
- 5th World Men's Team Championship
- Location: The Midlands, England
- Date(s): 4–13 May, 1976

Results
- Champions: (United Kingdom) Great Britain
- Runners-up: Pakistan
- Third place: Australia

The 1976 Men's World Team Amateur Squash Championships was the fifth edition of the tournament. It was held at thirteen Midlands Clubs in England and took place from 4 to 13 May 1976. This was the first time in the tournament's history that a nation other than Australia became the champion. Great Britain, the runners-up for four consecutive tournaments dating back to 1967, finally became champions of the tournament.
South Africa were barred from the competition.

== Results ==
=== Pool A ===
Team One	Team Two	Score
Australia	Egypt	2-1
Australia	Sweden	3-0
Australia	India	3-0
Australia	United States	3-0
Egypt	Sweden	2-1
Egypt	India	3-0
Egypt	United States	3-0
Sweden	India	3-0
Sweden	United States	3-0
India	United States	2-1

Pos	Nation	Team	P	W	L	Pts
1	Australia	Cam Nancarrow, Dean Williams, Steve Bowditch, Kevin Shawcross	4	4	0	8
2	Egypt	Aladin Alouba, Sheriff Ali, Gamal Awad	4	3	1	6
3	Sweden	Tarras Tovar, Mikael Hellstrom, Lars Kvant	4	2	2	4
4	India	Raj Manchandra, Nikhil Senapati, Fali Madon	4	1	3	2
5	United States	Bill Andruss, Peter Briggs, Gil Mateer, Tom Page	4	0	4	0

Nigeria withdrew from the Pool A & the tournament

=== Pool B ===
Team One	Team Two	Score
(United Kingdom) Great Britain	Pakistan	2-1
(United Kingdom) Great Britain	New Zealand	3-0
(United Kingdom) Great Britain	Canada	3-0
(United Kingdom) Great Britain	Kuwait	3-0
Pakistan	New Zealand	2-1
Pakistan	Canada	3-0
Pakistan	Kuwait	3-0
New Zealand	Canada	3-0
New Zealand	Kuwait	3-0
Canada	Kuwait	3-0

Pos	Nation	Team	P	W	L	Pts
1	(United Kingdom) Great Britain	Jonathan Leslie, Stuart Courtney, Philip Ayton, Ian Robinson	4	4	0	8
2	Pakistan	Mohamed Saleem, Maqsood Ahmed, Atlas Khan	4	3	1	6
3	New Zealand	Trevor Colyer, Howard Broun, Bruce Brownlee, Neven Barbour	4	2	2	4
4	Canada	Jug Walia, Colin Adair, Victor Harding, Mike Desaulniers	4	1	3	2
5	Kuwait	N Abdulla, M Suweldan, A Atiya	4	0	4	0

=== Final Pool ===
Held at the Edgbaston Priory Club from May 11–13.

Team One	Team Two	Score	Notes
(United Kingdom) Great Britain	Pakistan	2-1	(result carried forward from Pool B)
(United Kingdom) Great Britain	Australia	2-1	
(United Kingdom) Great Britain	Egypt	2-1	
Australia	Egypt	2-1	(result carried forward from Pool A)
Pakistan	Australia	3-0	
Pakistan	Egypt	2-1	

Pos	Nation	P	W	L	Pts
1	(United Kingdom) Great Britain	3	3	0	6
2	Pakistan	3	2	1	4
3	Australia	3	1	2	2
4	Egypt	3	0	3	0

== See also ==
- World Team Squash Championships
- World Squash Federation
- World Open (squash)

Preceded by (Johannesburg) South Africa; 1973	Squash World Team (The Midlands) England; 1976	Succeeded by (Toronto/Ottawa) Canada; 1977
