= John Easter =

English squash player, cricketer and businessman

- Easter in 1973

Personal information
- Full name: John Nicholas Cave Easter
- Born: 17 December 1945; Shawford, Hampshire, England
- Died: 11 January 2016 (aged 70)
- Batting: Right-handed
- Bowling: Right-arm medium
- Relatives: Nick Easter (son); Mark Easter (son); Anne Easter Smith (sister)

Domestic team information
- Years: Team
- 1966 to 1968: Oxford University

Career statistics
| Competition | First-class |
|---|---|
| Matches | 28 |
| Runs scored | 90 |
| Batting average | 3.91 |
| 100s/50s | 0/0 |
| Top score | 14 |
| Balls bowled | 4057 |
| Wickets | 58 |
| Bowling average | 33.44 |
| 5 wickets in innings | 1 |
| 10 wickets in match | 0 |
| Best bowling | 5/62 |
| Catches/stumpings | 8/– |
- Source: ESPN cricinfo, 9 March 2016

John Easter
Sport
Medal record
Men's squash
Representing England
European Team Championships
| Gold medal – first place | 1973 Edinburgh | Team |

John Nicholas Cave Easter (17 December 1945 – 11 January 2016) was an English squash player, cricketer and businessman.

== Education ==
John Easter attended St Edward's School, Oxford, before going up to Christ Church, Oxford, where he got an honours degree in Philosophy, Politics and Economics.

== Squash career ==
A tall, naturally gifted player, Easter got his squash blue for Oxford in 1966 and 1967 (the latter as captain). Between 1971 and 1983, he played 31 times for Great Britain and England. He turned professional in the 1973-74 season after leading Great Britain to second place at the World Championships in South Africa. At one stage he was ranked No. 9 in the world.

His best performances in the British Open were reaching the quarter-finals in 1970 and in 1971 (when he was seeded seventh). Easter won a gold medal for the England men's national squash team at the European Squash Team Championships in 1973.

== Cricket career ==
A pace bowler, Easter spent several seasons in the First XI at St Edward's School, captaining the team in 1964. He played for Oxford University in 1966 without establishing his place. He also played once for Surrey Second XI.

In 1967, Easter won his blue at Oxford, playing every match and taking 34 wickets at an average of 32.44, impressing with his accuracy. He took 5 for 62 against Northamptonshire, including a hat-trick. He was unable to play for most of the 1968 season, but returned to the team towards the end and won a second blue.

== Later life ==
After doing some modelling in his younger years, Easter spent his working life in the financial world.

He was diagnosed with Parkinson's disease in 2007, and died in 2016. He and his wife Glynis had a daughter and two sons. One son, Nick Easter, played rugby union for England from 2007 to 2016. The other son, Mark Easter, played rugby union for Sale Sharks and Northampton Saints.
