= Philip Ayton =

English squash player

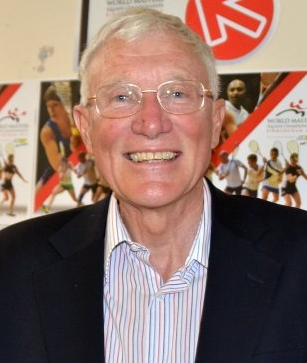
- Philip Ayton in 2011

Personal information
- Born: 26 January 1947 (age 79) London, England

Sport
- Country: England
- Handedness: Right Handed

Men's singles
- Highest ranking: No. 4 (February 1986)
Medal record
Men's squash
Representing Great Britain
World Team Championships
Gold medal – first place	1976 Birmingham	Team
Representing England
European Team Championships
Gold medal – first place	1973 Edinburgh	Team
Gold medal – first place	1974 Stockholm	Team
Gold medal – first place	1977 Sheffield	Team
Silver medal – second place	1980 Helsinki	Team

Philip Norman Ayton (born 26 January 1947) is an English former professional squash player. He reached a career-high world ranking of 4 in February 1986.

== Biography ==
Ayton studied at Hurstpierpoint College and Queens' College, Cambridge and represented the Cambridge University squash team for the 1965, 1966 and 1967 varsity matches (the last two as captain).

Ayton represented Sussex at county level. Ayton's finest success came at the 1976 Men's World Team Squash Championships, when he helped Great Britain become world champions with Jonathan Leslie, Stuart Courtney and Ian Robinson.

Ayton won three gold medals for the England men's national squash team at the European Squash Team Championships in 1973, 1974 and 1977.

Ayton was the British national champion in 1975.
