= Michael Corby (field hockey) =

British hockey & squash player (born 1940)

Personal information
- Born: 18 February 1940 (age 86)
- Height: 181 cm (5 ft 11 in)
- Weight: 71 kg (157 lb)

Sport
- Sport: Field hockey
Senior career
Years	Team	Caps	Goals
1959–1974	Hounslow	-	-
1975–1978	Southgate	-	-
National team
Years	Team	Caps	Goals
–	England & Great Britain		-
Medal record
Men's squash
Representing Great Britain
World Team Championships
Silver medal – second place	1969 Midlands	Team
Silver medal – second place	1971 Auckland	Team
Representing England
European Team Championships
Gold medal – first place	1975 Dublin	Team
British Amateur Championships
Silver medal – second place	1967/1968	singles
Silver medal – second place	1968/1969	singles

Michael Wells Corby (born 18 February 1940) is a British field hockey and squash player who competed at the 1964 Summer Olympics and the 1972 Summer Olympics in Hockey.

== Biography ==
Corby attended Mill Hill School in North London.

Corby played club hockey for Hounslow Hockey Club and while at the club represented Great Britain at the 1964 Olympic Games in Tokyo and was again a member of the Great Britain team at the 1972 Olympic Games in Munich.

Corby played squash at the same time and represented the England men's national squash team at the 1967, 1969 and the 1971 World Team Squash Championships. Corby won a gold medal for the England at the 1975 European Squash Team Championships in Dublin.

He finished runner-up behind Jonah Barrington at the British Amateur Squash Championships in 1968 and 1969.

In 1975 Corby was voted top amateur sportsman of Great Britain and left Hounslow to join the Southgate Hockey Club team. He was part of the team that won the EuroHockey Club Champions Cup for three successive years in 1976, 1977 and 1978.
