= Jonah Barrington (squash player) =

Irish squash player

Personal information
- Born: 29 April 1941 (age 85) Morwenstow, Cornwall, England

Sport

Men's singles
Medal record
Representing Ireland
World Amateur Championship
Silver medal – second place	1969 London	singles
European Team Championships
Bronze medal – third place	1981 Amsterdam	team
British Amateur Championships
Gold medal – first place	1966/1967	singles
Gold medal – first place	1967/1968	singles
Gold medal – first place	1968/1969	singles

Jonah Barrington MBE (born 29 April 1941) is a retired Irish/English squash player, originally from Morwenstow, Cornwall, England and have World Amateur Squash Championship medal.

== Biography ==
A Cornish-born Irish squash player and attended Headfort School in County Meath and Cheltenham College, and spent two years at Trinity College Dublin.

Barrington won the British Open (which was considered to be the effective world championship event before the World Squash Championships began) six times between 1967 and 1973, and was known as "Mr. Squash". Barrington was the British national champion in 1980 and won three consecutive British Amateur Squash Championships from 1966 to 1969.

Barrington turned professional the day after losing the 1969 World Amateur Squash Championship final to Australian Geoff Hunt. He appointed Clive Everton as his agent.

In 1974, he was a leading participant in the formation of the International Squash Players Association (ISPA), which was formed to give players a voice in an era dominated by the Squash Rackets Association. He was elected chairman alongside Ken Hiscoe (president), Geoff Hunt (vice-president) and Geoff Poole (secretary).

In 1982 Barrington co-authored the book Murder in the Squash Court: the Only Way to Win.

The six-time British Open champion coached Egyptian world no.1 and 2015 British Open champion Mohamed El Shorbagy. and Israeli squash player Daniel Poleshchuk.

Barrington is the father of professional squash player and commentator Joey Barrington.

== British Open titles ==
Year	Opponent in final	Score in final
1967	Aftab Jawaid	9–2, 5–9, 9–2, 9–2
1968	A.A. AbouTaleb	9–6, 9–0, 9–5
1970	Geoff Hunt	9–7, 3–9, 9–4, 9–4
1971	Aftab Jawaid	9–1, 9–2, 9–6
1972	Geoff Hunt	0–9, 9–7, 10–8, 6–9, 9–7
1973	Gogi Alauddin	9–4, 9–3, 9–2

== Books ==
- 2023, The Book of Jonah (with Clive Everton), Cork: Oak Tree Press; ISBN 9781781195499
- 2023, Jonah: The Official Biography of Jonah Barrington (by Ross Reyburn & Michael Emery), Cork: Oak Tree Press; ISBN 9781781195468
- 2024, Murder in the Squash Court: The Only Way to Win (with Angela Patmore), Cork: Oak Tree Press; ISBN 9781781196328
