= Aftab Jawaid =

Pakistani squash player (born 1937)

Personal information
- Nationality: Pakistani
- Born: 1937 (age 88–89) Gurdaspur, Indian Punjab

Sport
Medal record
British Open
Silver medal – second place	1966 London	singles
Silver medal – second place	1967 London	singles
Silver medal – second place	1971 Birmingham	singles
British Amateur Championships
Gold medal – first place	1963/1964	singles
Gold medal – first place	1964/1965	singles
Gold medal – first place	1965/1966	singles

Aftab Jawaid (also transliterated Aftab Javed; Urdu: آفتاب جاوید) is a former squash player from Pakistan, who was one of the game's leading players in the 1960s.

== Biography ==
He was born in Gurdaspur, a city in Indian Punjab in 1937, and currently resides in Manchester. He has a son and two daughters.

He won the British Amateur championship three times (in 1963/64, 1964/65 and 1965/66) and finished runner-up at the British Open three times (in 1966, 1967 and 1971). He arranged the PIA squash tour and was Pakistan's national coach.

== Family ==
His nephew Qamar Zaman was a leading squash player in the 1970s and 1980s.
