= A. A. AbouTaleb =

Egyptian squash player

Abdelfattah AbouTaleb, better known as "A.A. AbouTaleb", or simply "AbouTaleb", was a squash player from Egypt. During the 1960s, he won the British Open three times.

AbouTaleb started out by sweeping the courts at Cairo's National Sporting Club, where his brother was the tennis professional. At first, he had to play with discarded broken rackets and burst balls.

AbouTaleb reached the final of the British Open for the first time in 1963, when he lost to Pakistan's Mo Khan in five-sets 9–4, 5–9, 3–9, 10–8, 9–6. (The British Open was considered to be the effective world championship of the sport at the time.)

AbouTaleb then went on to win the British Open title for the next three consecutive years. In 1964, he beat Mike Oddy of Scotland in the final 9–3, 9–7, 9–0. AbouTaleb's win that year marked the end of 13 years of Pakistani domination of the British Open men's title. The following year, AbouTaleb beat fellow Egyptian player Ibrahim Amin in the final 9–0, 0–9, 9–1, 9–6. His third and final British Open title came in 1966, when he defeated Pakistan's Aftab Jawaid in the final 9–6, 5–9, 9–3, 9–1.

== British Open final appearances ==
Wins (3)
Year	Opponent in final	Score in final
1964	Mike Oddy	9–3, 9–7, 9-0
1965	Ibrahim Amin	9–0, 0–9, 9–1, 9-6
1966	Aftab Jawaid	9–6, 5–9, 9–3, 9-1
Runners-up (2)
Year	Opponent in final	Score in final
1963	Mo Khan	9–4, 5–9, 3–9, 10–8, 9-6
1968	Jonah Barrington	9–6, 9–0, 9-5
