= World Squash Team Championships =

International squash competition

- Sport: Squash
- Founded: M: 1967; W: 1976
- Countries: World Squash members
- Continent: International
- Most recent champions: M: Egypt (7th title); W: Egypt (6th title)
- Most titles: M: Australia (8 titles); W: Australia (9 titles)
- Broadcaster: WorldSquashTV
- Website: World Squash Federation

The World Squash Team Championships are an international squash competition organised by the World Squash Federation and played between teams representing different nations. Countries enter teams of three or four players to represent them in the championships. In each round of the competition, teams face each other in a best-of-three singles matches contest. The competition is held once every two years, with the venue changing each time. Normally the men's and women's events are held in different years in two locations. Australia have won the championship a record eight times, followed by Pakistan, which have been champions on six occasions.

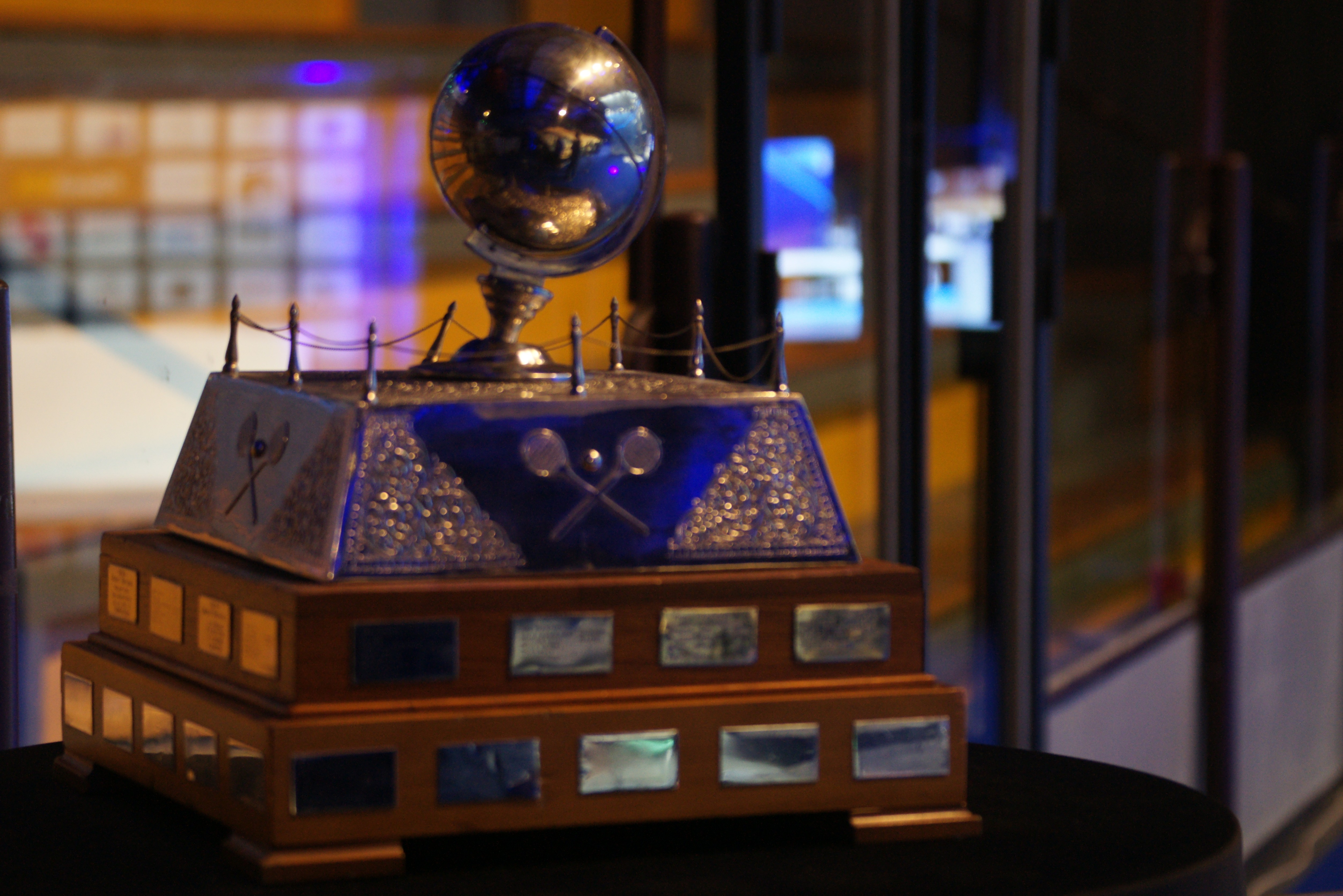
WSF World Team Squash Championships Trophy

== Men's tournament ==
=== Past winners ===
Year	Champions	Runners-up	Third-Place	Fourth-Place	Venue
1967	Australia	(United Kingdom) Great Britain	New Zealand	South Africa	Melbourne, Australia
1969	Australia	(United Kingdom) Great Britain	South Africa	Pakistan	Birmingham, England
1971	Australia	(United Kingdom) Great Britain	Pakistan	Egypt	Palmerston North, New Zealand
1973	Australia	(United Kingdom) Great Britain	South Africa	New Zealand	Johannesburg, South Africa
1976	(United Kingdom) Great Britain	Pakistan	Australia	Egypt	Birmingham, England
1977	Pakistan	New Zealand	Egypt	(United Kingdom) Great Britain	Toronto, Canada
1979	(United Kingdom) Great Britain	Pakistan	Australia	Egypt	Brisbane, Australia
1981	Pakistan	Australia	Egypt	England	Stockholm, Sweden
1983	Pakistan	England	Australia	Egypt	Auckland, New Zealand
1985	Pakistan	New Zealand	Australia	England	Cairo, Egypt
1987	Pakistan	New Zealand	England	Australia	London, England
1989	Australia	Pakistan	England	New Zealand	Singapore
1991	Australia	England	Finland	Egypt	Helsinki, Finland
1993	Pakistan	Australia	England	Finland	Karachi, Pakistan
1995	England	Pakistan	Egypt	Australia	Cairo, Egypt
1997	England	Canada	Australia	Egypt	Petaling Jaya, Malaysia
1999	Egypt	Wales	England	Australia	Cairo, Egypt
2001	Australia	Egypt	England	Scotland	Melbourne, Australia
2003	Australia	France	England	Egypt	Vienna, Austria
2005	England	Egypt	France	Canada	Islamabad, Pakistan
2007	England	Australia	France	Egypt	Chennai, India
2009	Egypt	France	Australia	England	Odense, Denmark
2011	Egypt	England	Australia	France	Paderborn, Germany
2013	England	Egypt	France	Australia	Mulhouse, France
2015	Cancelled due to safety concerns				Cairo, Egypt
2017	Egypt	England	Australia / Hong Kong		Marseille, France
2019	Egypt	England	France / Wales		Washington, United States
2021	Cancelled due to COVID-19 pandemic				Kuala Lumpur, Malaysia
2023	Egypt	England	France / Switzerland		Tauranga, New Zealand
2024	Egypt	England	France / Switzerland		Hong Kong, China

=== Summary of finalists ===
Country	Winners	Runners-up
Australia	8	3
Egypt	7	3
Pakistan	6	4
England	5	7
Great Britain	2	4
New Zealand	0	3
France	0	2
Canada	0	1
Wales	0	1

== Women's tournament ==
=== Past winners ===
Year	Champions	Runners-up	Third-Place	Venue
1979	(United Kingdom) Great Britain	Australia	(Republic of Ireland) Ireland	Birmingham, England
1981	Australia	England	New Zealand	Toronto, Canada
1983	Australia	England	New Zealand	Perth, Australia
1985	England	New Zealand	Australia	(Republic of Ireland) Dublin, Ireland
1987	England	Australia	New Zealand	Auckland, New Zealand
1989	England	Australia	New Zealand	Warmond, Netherlands
1990	England	Australia	New Zealand	Sydney, Australia
1992	Australia	New Zealand	England	Vancouver, Canada
1994	Australia	England	South Africa	Saint Peter Port, Guernsey
1996	Australia	England	South Africa	Petaling Jaya, Malaysia
1998	Australia	England	New Zealand	Stuttgart, Germany
2000	England	Australia	New Zealand	Sheffield, England
2002	Australia	England	New Zealand	Odense, Denmark
2004	Australia	England	New Zealand	Amsterdam, Netherlands
2006	England	Egypt	Malaysia	Edmonton, Canada
2008	Egypt	England	Malaysia	Cairo, Egypt
2010	Australia	England	Malaysia	Palmerston North, New Zealand
2012	Egypt	England	Malaysia	Nîmes, France
2014	England	Malaysia	Egypt	Niagara-on-the-Lake, Canada
2016	Egypt	England	Hong Kong / France	Paris, France
2018	Egypt	England	Hong Kong / France	Dalian, China
2020	Cancelled due to COVID-19 pandemic			Kuala Lumpur, Malaysia
2022	Egypt	United States	Malaysia / England	Madinaty, Egypt
2024	Egypt	United States	Belgium / Malaysia	Hong Kong, China

=== Summary of finalists ===
Country	Winners	Runners-up
Australia	9	5
England	7	12
Egypt	6	1
(United Kingdom) Great Britain	1	0
New Zealand	0	2
United States	0	2
Malaysia	0	1

== See also ==
- European Squash Team Championships
- Asian Squash Team Championships
- Pan American Championships
- Squash World Cup
