= 2018 Men's World Junior Team Squash Championships =

Men's World Junior Team 2018
- 20th WSF Men's World Junior Team Championships
- Location: (India) Chennai
- Website www.wsfworldjuniors.com

Results
- Champion: Egypt
- Runner-up: England
- Third place: Czech Republic / United States

The 2018 Men's World Junior Team Squash Championships was held in Chennai, India. The event took place from 24 to 29 July 2018.

== Seeds ==
1. Egypt
2. Canada
3. England
4. Malaysia
5. India
6. Czech Republic
7. Colombia
8. United States

== Group stage ==
=== Pool A ===
Egypt	3–0	Singapore
Egypt	3–0	Australia
Australia	3–0	Singapore

Rank	Nation	Match	Win	Lost	Points
1	Egypt	2	2	0	4
2	Australia	2	1	1	2
3	Singapore	2	0	2	0

=== Pool B ===
Canada	3–0	Scotland
Canada	2–1	Argentina
Argentina	2–1	Scotland

Rank	Nation	Match	Win	Lost	Points
1	Canada	2	2	0	4
2	Argentina	2	1	1	2
3	Scotland	2	0	2	0

=== Pool C ===
England	2–1	South Africa
England	3–0	Ireland
Ireland	2–1	South Africa

Rank	Nation	Match	Win	Lost	Points
1	England	2	2	0	4
2	Ireland	2	1	1	2
3	South Africa	2	0	2	0

=== Pool D ===
Malaysia	3–0	Germany
Malaysia	2–1	France
France	1–2	Germany

Rank	Nation	Match	Win	Lost	Points
1	Malaysia	2	2	0	4
2	Germany	2	1	1	2
3	France	2	0	2	0

=== Pool E ===
India	3–0	Saudi Arabia
India	2–1	Switzerland
Switzerland	3–0	Saudi Arabia

Rank	Nation	Match	Win	Lost	Points
1	India	2	2	0	4
2	Switzerland	2	1	1	2
3	Saudi Arabia	2	0	2	0

=== Pool F ===
Czech Republic	3–0	Zimbabwe
Czech Republic	2–1	Pakistan
Pakistan	3–0	Zimbabwe

Rank	Nation	Match	Win	Lost	Points
1	Czech Republic	2	2	0	4
2	Pakistan	2	1	1	2
3	Zimbabwe	2	0	2	0

=== Pool G ===
Colombia	3–0	Qatar
Colombia	1–2	New Zealand
New Zealand	3–0	Qatar

Rank	Nation	Match	Win	Lost	Points
1	New Zealand	2	2	0	4
2	Colombia	2	1	1	2
3	Qatar	2	0	2	0

=== Pool H ===
United States	3–0	Finland
United States	0–3	Hong Kong
Hong Kong	3–0	Finland

Rank	Nation	Match	Win	Lost	Points
1	Hong Kong	2	2	0	4
2	United States	2	1	1	2
3	Finland	2	0	2	0

== Knockout stage ==
=== Bracket ===
Round of 16
Egypt	3	3	2
Argentina	0	0	0
Hong Kong	0	3	3
Colombia	3	0	2
Malaysia	3	3
Ireland	1	1
Czech Republic	3	3
Switzerland	0	0
Pakistan	3	3	0
India	1	1	2
Germany	0	0
England	3	3
United States	3	3
New Zealand	1	2
Australia	1	2	1
Canada	3	3	2

Quarterfinals
Egypt	3	2	3
Hong Kong	0	0	0
Malaysia	1	1
Czech Republic	3	3
Pakistan	1	2	2
England	3	1	3
United States	3	3	2
Canada	2	1	3

Semifinals
Egypt	3	2	3
Czech Republic	0	0	0
England	3	2	3
United States	0	1	0

Final
Egypt	3	3
England	0	0

=== Semi-finals ===
Egypt
3
Semi-final 1
Chennai, India
28 July 2018

Czech Republic
0

			1	2	3	4	5
1	(Egypt) (Czech Republic)	Marwan Tarek; Viktor Byrtus	11; 8	11; 5	11; 4
2	(Egypt) (Czech Republic)	Omar El Torkey; Marek Panacek	11; 3	11; 7
3	(Egypt) (Czech Republic)	Mostafa Asal; Ondrej Vorlicek	11; 8	11; 9	11; 2

England
3
Semi-final 2
Chennai, India
28 July 2018

United States
0

			1	2	3	4	5
1	(England) (United States)	Nicholas Wall; Daelum Mawji	11; 5	11; 8	11; 5
2	(England) (United States)	Samuel Todd; Ayush Menon	5; 11	11; 3	11; 2
3	(England) (United States)	James Wyatt; Thomas Rosini	11; 4	11; 8	11; 7

=== Final ===
Egypt
2
Final
Chennai, India
29 July 2018

England
0

			1	2	3	4	5
1	(Egypt) (England)	Marwan Tarek; Nicholas Wall	12; 10	11; 6	11; 7
2	(Egypt) (England)	Omar El Torkey; Samuel Todd	13; 11	11; 4	11; 4
3	(Egypt) (England)	Mostafa Asal; James Wyatt						not played

== Final standing ==
Rank	Team
1	Egypt
2	England
3	Czech Republic
3	United States
5	Canada
6	Malaysia
7	Hong Kong
8	Pakistan
9	Switzerland
10	New Zealand
11	India
12	Argentina
13	Colombia
14	Australia
15	Ireland
16	Germany
17	Scotland
18	France
19	South Africa
20	Singapore
21	Finland
22	Qatar
23	Zimbabwe
24	Saudi Arabia

== See also ==
- 2018 Men's World Junior Squash Championships
- World Junior Squash Championships

Preceded by Poland (Bielsko-Biała); 2016	Squash World Junior Team; India (Chennai); 2018	Succeeded by Australia (Gold Coast); 2020
