= Botswana men's national squash team =

Botswana
- Coach: Tiego Rabasha
- Association: Botswana Squash Rackets Association

World Team Championships
- First year: 2013
- Titles: 0
- Runners-up: 0
- Best finish: 24th
- Entries: 1

The Botswana men's national squash team represents Botswana in international squash team competitions, and is governed by Botswana Squash Rackets Association.

== Current team ==
- Alister Walker
- Lekgotla Mosope
- Jason Boyle
- Theo Pelonomi

== Results ==
=== World Team Squash Championships ===
Year	Result	Position	W	L
(Australia) Melbourne 1967	Did not present			
(England) Birmingham 1969	Did not present			
(New Zealand) Palmerston North 1971	Did not present			
(South Africa) Johannesburg 1973	Did not present			
(England) Birmingham 1976	Did not present			
(Canada) Toronto 1977	Did not present			
(Australia) Brisbane 1979	Did not present			
(Sweden) Stockholm 1981	Did not present			
(New Zealand) Auckland 1983	Did not present			
(Egypt) Cairo 1985	Did not present			
(England) London 1987	Did not present			
Singapore 1989	Did not present			
(Finland) Helsinki 1991	Did not present			
(Pakistan) Karachi 1993	Did not present			
(Egypt) Cairo 1995	Did not present			
(Malaysia) Petaling Jaya 1997	Did not present			
(Egypt) Cairo 1999	Did not present			
(Australia) Melbourne 2001	Did not present			
(Austria) Vienna 2003	Did not present			
(Pakistan) Islamabad 2005	Did not present			
(India) Chennai 2007	Did not present			
(Denmark) Odense 2009	Did not present			
(Germany) Paderborn 2011	Did not present			
(France) Mulhouse 2013	Group Stage	24th	2	5
(Egypt) Cairo 2015	Cancelled			
(France) Marseille 2017	Did not present			
(United States) Washington, D.C. 2019	Did not present			
Total	1/26	0 Title	2	5

== See also ==
- Botswana Squash Rackets Association
- World Team Squash Championships
