= South Korea men's national squash team =

South Korea
- Coach: Gul Yunhoe
- Association: Korea Squash Federation

World Team Championships
- First year: 2003
- Titles: 0
- Runners-up: 0
- Best finish: 22nd
- Entries: 3

Asian Team Championships
- Titles: 0
- Runners-up: 0

The South Korea men's national squash team represents South Korea in international squash team competitions, and is governed by Korea Squash Federation.

== Current team ==
- JaeJin Yoo
- Ko Youngjo
- Jong Myoung Park
- Han Dong Ryu

== Results ==
=== World Team Squash Championships ===
Year	Result	Position	W	L
(Australia) Melbourne 1967	Did not present			
(England) Birmingham 1969	Did not present			
(New Zealand) Palmerston North 1971	Did not present			
(South Africa) Johannesburg 1973	Did not present			
(England) Birmingham 1976	Did not present			
(Canada) Toronto 1977	Did not present			
(Australia) Brisbane 1979	Did not present			
(Sweden) Stockholm 1981	Did not present			
(New Zealand) Auckland 1983	Did not present			
(Egypt) Cairo 1985	Did not present			
(England) London 1987	Did not present			
Singapore 1989	Did not present			
(Finland) Helsinki 1991	Did not present			
(Pakistan) Karachi 1993	Did not present			
(Egypt) Cairo 1995	Did not present			
(Malaysia) Petaling Jaya 1997	Did not present			
(Egypt) Cairo 1999	Did not present			
(Australia) Melbourne 2001	Did not present			
(Austria) Vienna 2003	Group Stage	27th	2	5
(Pakistan) Islamabad 2005	Did not present			
(India) Chennai 2007	Did not present			
(Denmark) Odense 2009	Did not present			
(Germany) Paderborn 2011	Group Stage	27th	1	6
(France) Mulhouse 2013	Did not present			
(Egypt) Cairo 2015	Cancelled			
(France) Marseille 2017	Did not present			
(United States) Washington, D.C. 2019	Group Stage	22nd	1	5
Total	3/26	0 Title	4	16

=== Asian Squash Team Championships ===
Year	Result	Position
(Pakistan) Karachi 1981	Not in the Top 4	
(Jordan) Amman 1984	Not in the Top 4	
(Malaysia) Kuala Lumpur 1986	Not in the Top 4	
Kuwait City 1988	Not in the Top 4	
(India) Kolkata 1990	Not in the Top 4	
(Pakistan) Peshawar 1992	Not in the Top 4	
(Malaysia) Kuala Lumpur 1994	Not in the Top 4	
(Jordan) Amman 1996	Not in the Top 4	
(Malaysia) Kuala Lumpur 1998	Not in the Top 4	
Hong Kong 2000	Not in the Top 4	
(Malaysia) Kuala Lumpur 2002	Not in the Top 4	
(Malaysia) Kuala Lumpur 2004	Not in the Top 4	
(Chinese Taipei) Taiwan 2006	Not in the Top 4	
Kuwait City 2008	Not in the Top 4	
(India) Chennai 2010	Not in the Top 4	
Kuwait City 2012	Not in the Top 4	
Hong Kong 2014	Not in the Top 4	
(Chinese Taipei) Taiwan 2016	Not in the Top 4	
(South Korea) Cheongju 2018	Not in the Top 4	
(Malaysia) Kuala Lumpur 2020	Cancelled	
Total	/	

== See also ==
- Korea Squash Federation
- World Team Squash Championships
