= 2022 Men's Asian Squash Team Championships =

2022 Asian Squash Team Championships
- 21st Men's Asian Squash Team Championships
- Location: Cheongju, South Korea
- Venue: Cheongju International Squash Stadium
- Date: 31 October – 4 November

Results
- Champions: India
- Runners-up: Kuwait
- Third place: Hong Kong, Malaysia (shared)

The 2022 Men's Asian Squash Team Championships was the 21st edition of Asian men's team championship for squash players. The event was held at Cheongju International Squash Stadium in Cheongju, South Korea, from 31 October to 4 November 2022.

== Participating teams and seeds ==
1. India
2. Malaysia
3. Hong Kong
4. Qatar
5. Pakistan
6. Japan

7. Iran
8. Kuwait
9. South Korea
10. Philippines
11. Singapore
12. Chinese Taipei

== Group stage ==
=== Pool A ===
Pos.	Team	Players	TPd	TPt	MP	Qualification
1	India	Saurav Ghosal, Ramit Tandon, Abhay Singh, Velavan Senthilkumar	5	5	15	Semifinals
2	Kuwait	Ammar Al-Tamimi, Abdullah Al-Muzayen, Ali Al-Ramezi, Falah Mohammad	5	4	10	Semifinals
3	Pakistan	Noor Zaman, Ahsan Ayaz, Hamza Khan, Farhan Mehboob	5	2	7	5th - 8th places
4	South Korea	Yoo Jae-jin, Lee Min-woo, Lee Se-hyun, Na Joo-young	5	2	6	5th - 8th places
5	Qatar	Abdulla Al-Tamimi, Syed Azlan Amjad, Yousef Al-Kubaisi, Ahmad Al-Tamiimi	5	2	5	9th - 12th places
6	Chinese Taipei	Huang Cheng-yao, Chen Wun-lin, Wei Chih-yu, Pan Shao-yu	5	0	2	9th - 12th places

India
3

Court A
31 October 2022

South Korea
0

			1	2	3	4	5
1	(India) (South Korea)	Saurav Ghosal; Yoo Jae-jin	11; 6	11; 8	11; 8
2	(India) (South Korea)	Velavan Senthilkumar; Lee Se-hyun	11; 0	11; 3	11; 6
3	(India) (South Korea)	Abhay Singh; Lee Min-woo	6; 11	11; 8	11; 7	11; 9

Qatar
0

Court B
31 October 2022

Kuwait
3

			1	2	3	4	5
1	(Qatar) (Kuwait)	Abdulla Al-Tamimi; Ammar Al-Tamimi	11; 6	6; 11	7; 11	11; 6	3; 11
2	(Qatar) (Kuwait)	Ahmad Al-Tamiimi; Ali Al-Ramezi	1; 11	2; 11	3; 11
3	(Qatar) (Kuwait)	Syed Azlan Amjad; Abdullah Al-Mezayen	4; 11	9; 11	9; 11

Pakistan
3

Grand Court
31 October 2022

Chinese Taipei
0

			1	2	3	4	5
1	(Pakistan) (Chinese Taipei)	Noor Zaman; Huang Cheng-yao	11; 8	8; 11	13; 15	11; 7	11; 7
2	(Pakistan) (Chinese Taipei)	Farhan Mehboob; Wei Chih-yu	11; 2	11; 8	11; 6
3	(Pakistan) (Chinese Taipei)	Hamza Khan; Chen Wun-lin	11; 4	11; 6	11; 6

Qatar
2

Court A
31 October 2022

Chinese Taipei
1

			1	2	3	4	5
1	(Qatar) (Chinese Taipei)	Abdulla Al-Tamimi; Chen Wun-lin	11; 5	11; 9	11; 6
2	(Qatar) (Chinese Taipei)	Yousef Al-Kubaisi; Pan Shao-yu	5; 11	14; 12	8; 11	11; 5	9; 11
3	(Qatar) (Chinese Taipei)	Syed Azlan Amjad; Wei Chih-yu	11; 6	11; 3	11; 5

Pakistan
3

Grand Court
31 October 2022

South Korea
0

			1	2	3	4	5
1	(Pakistan) (South Korea)	Noor Zaman; Lee Min-woo	2; 11	9; 11	11; 9	11; 5	11; 8
2	(Pakistan) (South Korea)	Farhan Mehboob; Na Joo-young	3; 11	11; 9	11; 9	9; 11	11; 9
3	(Pakistan) (South Korea)	Hamza Khan; Lee Se-hyun	11; 3	11; 6	15; 13

India
3

Court D
31 October 2022

Kuwait
0

			1	2	3	4	5
1	(India) (Kuwait)	Saurav Ghosal; Ammar Al-Tamimi	11; 3	11; 5	11; 5
2	(India) (Kuwait)	Velavan Senthilkumar; Falah Mohammad	11; 3	11; 5	11; 4
3	(India) (Kuwait)	Ramit Tandon; Abdullah Al-Mezayen	11; 7	10; 12	11; 7	11; 9

Kuwait
2

Court A
1 November 2022

Chinese Taipei
1

			1	2	3	4	5
1	(Kuwait) (Chinese Taipei)	Ali Al-Ramezi; Pan Shao-yu	11; 1	11; 5	11; 4
2	(Kuwait) (Chinese Taipei)	Abdullah Al-Mezayen; Chen Wun-lin	11; 0	11; 3	11; 0
3	(Kuwait) (Chinese Taipei)	Ammar Al-Tamimi; Huang Cheng-yao	3; 11	3; 11	8; 11

India
3

Court D
1 November 2022

Pakistan
0

			1	2	3	4	5
1	(India) (Pakistan)	Abhay Singh; Farhan Mehboob	11; 5	11; 8	11; 8
2	(India) (Pakistan)	Ramit Tandon; Hamza Khan	11; 5	11; 6	11; 6
3	(India) (Pakistan)	Saurav Ghosal; Noor Zaman	11; 5	11; 6	11; 3

Qatar
1

Court E
1 November 2022

South Korea
2

			1	2	3	4	5
1	(Qatar) (South Korea)	Yousef Al-Kubaisi; Na Joo-young	4; 11	4; 11	2; 11
2	(Qatar) (South Korea)	Syed Azlan Amjad; Lee Min-woo	3; 11	9; 11	8; 11
3	(Qatar) (South Korea)	Abdulla Al-Tamimi; Yoo Jae-jin	9; 11	13; 11	11; 5	11; 4

Pakistan
0

Court A
1 November 2022

Kuwait
3

			1	2	3	4	5
1	(Pakistan) (Kuwait)	Hamza Khan; Ali Al-Ramezi	5; 11	9; 11	10; 12
2	(Pakistan) (Kuwait)	Ahsan Ayaz; Abdullah Al-Mezayen	5; 11	6; 11	5; 11
3	(Pakistan) (Kuwait)	Noor Zaman; Ammar Al-Tamimi	3; 11	2; 11	0; 11

India
3

Grand Court
1 November 2022

Qatar
0

			1	2	3	4	5
1	(India) (Qatar)	Velavan Senthilkumar; Yousef Al-Kubaisi	11; 2	11; 4	11; 2
2	(India) (Qatar)	Ramit Tandon; Syed Azlan Amjad	11; 8	11; 4	11; 8
3	(India) (Qatar)	Saurav Ghosal; Abdulla Al-Tamimi	11; 6	11; 6	5; 11	11; 6

South Korea
3

Court D
1 November 2022

Chinese Taipei
0

			1	2	3	4	5
1	(South Korea) (Chinese Taipei)	Na Joo-young; Pan Shao-yu	11; 2	11; 5	11; 3
2	(South Korea) (Chinese Taipei)	Lee Se-hyun; Wei Chih-yu	11; 2	11; 3	11; 4
3	(South Korea) (Chinese Taipei)	Yoo Jae-jin; Chen Wun-lin	11; 8	11; 8	11; 4

Qatar
2

Court A
2 November 2022

Pakistan
1

			1	2	3	4	5
1	(Qatar) (Pakistan)	Syed Azlan Amjad; Hamza Khan	11; 7	9; 11	11; 9	11; 6
2	(Qatar) (Pakistan)	Yousef Al-Kubaisi; Farhan Mehboob	4; 11	2; 11	4; 11
3	(Qatar) (Pakistan)	Abdulla Al-Tamimi; Noor Zaman	12; 10	12; 10	11; 9

Kuwait
2

Grand Court
2 November 2022

South Korea
1

			1	2	3	4	5
1	(Kuwait) (South Korea)	Abdullah Al-Mezayen; Lee Se-hyun	11; 8	11; 5	11; 6
2	(Kuwait) (South Korea)	Ali Al-Ramezi; Na Joo-young	15; 17	12; 10	11; 2	8; 11	11; 3
3	(Kuwait) (South Korea)	Ammar Al-Tamimi; Lee Min-woo	0; 11	0; 11	0; 11

India
3

Court D
2 November 2022

Chinese Taipei
0

			1	2	3	4	5
1	(India) (Chinese Taipei)	Abhay Singh; Chen Wun-lin	11; 8	11; 9	11; 8
2	(India) (Chinese Taipei)	Velavan Senthilkumar; Wei Chih-yu	11; 8	11; 4	11; 3
3	(India) (Chinese Taipei)	Ramit Tandon; Huang Chao-yu	11; 4	11; 4	11; 6

=== Pool B ===
Pos.	Team	Players	TPd	TPt	MP	Qualification
1	Hong Kong	Henry Leung, Lau Tsz Kwan, Wong Chi Him, Tang Ming Hong	5	5	14	Semifinals
2	Malaysia	Ng Eain Yow, Addeen Idrakie, Mohammad Syafiq Kamal, Ong Sai Hung	5	4	13	Semifinals
3	Japan	Ryūnosuke Tsukue, Tomotaka Endo, Naoki Hayashi, Shota Yasunari	5	3	8	5th - 8th places
4	Iran	Alireza Shameli, Sepehr Etemadpoor, Samioolah Ghased Abadi, Mohammad Kashani	5	2	5	5th - 8th places
5	Singapore	Samuel Kang, Aaron Liang, Marcus Phua, Timothy Leong	5	1	4	9th - 12th places
6	Philippines	Robert Garcia, Reymark Begornia, David Pelino, Jonathan Reyes	5	0	1	9th - 12th places

Malaysia
3

Court B
31 October 2022

Philippines
0

			1	2	3	4	5
1	(Malaysia) (Philippines)	Ng Eain Yow; Robert Garcia	11; 6	11; 6	11; 8
2	(Malaysia) (Philippines)	Ong Sai Hung; David Pelino	11; 6	11; 3	11; 4
3	(Malaysia) (Philippines)	Mohammad Syafiq Kamal; Reymark Begornia	11; 5	11; 6	11; 3

Hong Kong
3

Court D
31 October 2022

Iran
0

			1	2	3	4	5
1	(Hong Kong) (Iran)	Henry Leung; Alireza Shameli	11; 5	11; 7	11; 7
2	(Hong Kong) (Iran)	Wong Chi Him; Mohammad Kashani	9; 11	11; 4	11; 1	11; 5
3	(Hong Kong) (Iran)	Lau Tsz Kwan; Sepehr Etemadpoor	11; 9	9; 11	11; 9	11; 9

Japan
3

Grand Court
31 October 2022

Singapore
0

			1	2	3	4	5
1	(Japan) (Singapore)	Ryunosuke Tsukue; Samuel Kang	11; 5	11; 2	11; 2
2	(Japan) (Singapore)	Naoki Hayashi; Marcus Phua	11; 2	12; 10	7; 11	11; 8
3	(Japan) (Singapore)	Tomotaka Endo; Aaron Liang	23; 21	11; 5	11; 3

Japan
2

Court A
31 October 2022

Philippines
1

			1	2	3	4	5
1	(Japan) (Philippines)	Ryunosuke Tsukue; Robert Garcia	5; 11	11; 2	11; 9	11; 3
2	(Japan) (Philippines)	Naoki Hayashi; David Pelino	11; 3	11; 0	11; 4
3	(Japan) (Philippines)	Tomotaka Endo; Reymark Begornia						w/o

Hong Kong
3

Grand Court
31 October 2022

Singapore
0

			1	2	3	4	5
1	(Hong Kong) (Singapore)	Henry Leung; Samuel Kang	11; 5	11; 2	11; 8
2	(Hong Kong) (Singapore)	Tang Ming Hong; Timothy Leong	11; 5	11; 4	11; 9
3	(Hong Kong) (Singapore)	Lau Tsz Kwan; Aaron Liang	11; 9	11; 2	11; 4

Malaysia
3

Court D
31 October 2022

Iran
0

			1	2	3	4	5
1	(Malaysia) (Iran)	Ng Eain Yow; Alireza Shameli	11; 6	11; 5	11; 6
2	(Malaysia) (Iran)	Mohammad Syafiq Kamal; Samioolah Ghased Abadi	11; 8	11; 2	11; 5
3	(Malaysia) (Iran)	Addeen Idrakie; Sepehr Etemadpoor	11; 7	11; 3	11; 8

Malaysia
3

Grand Court
1 November 2022

Japan
0

			1	2	3	4	5
1	(Malaysia) (Japan)	Mohammad Syafiq Kamal; Shota Yasunari	7; 11	11; 0	11; 8	11; 7
2	(Malaysia) (Japan)	Addeen Idrakie; Naoki Hayashi	11; 6	11; 6	11; 2
3	(Malaysia) (Japan)	Ng Eain Yow; Ryunosuke Tsukue	11; 8	11; 3	11; 8

Hong Kong
3

Court D
1 November 2022

Philippines
0

			1	2	3	4	5
1	(Hong Kong) (Philippines)	Tang Ming Hong; Jonathan Reyes	11; 9	11; 2	11; 4
2	(Hong Kong) (Philippines)	Lau Tsz Kwan; David Pelino	11; 4	11; 2	11; 7
3	(Hong Kong) (Philippines)	Henry Leung; Reymark Begornia	11; 8	11; 5	11; 6

Iran
2

Court E
1 November 2022

Singapore
1

			1	2	3	4	5
1	(Iran) (Singapore)	Mohammad Kashani; Marcus Phua	8; 11	5; 11	7; 11
2	(Iran) (Singapore)	Sepehr Etemadpoor; Aaron Liang	11; 9	11; 9	6; 11	7; 11	11; 6
3	(Iran) (Singapore)	Alireza Shameli; Samuel Kang	11; 7	9; 11	11; 6	11; 7

Philippines
0

Court A
1 November 2022

Singapore
3

			1	2	3	4	5
1	(Philippines) (Singapore)	David Pelino; Marcus Phua	6; 11	4; 11	6; 11
2	(Philippines) (Singapore)	Reymark Begornia; Aaron Liang	11; 7	3; 11	10; 12	5; 11
3	(Philippines) (Singapore)	Robert Garcia; Samuel Kang	15; 13	6; 11	10; 12	9; 11

Malaysia
1

Grand Court
1 November 2022

Hong Kong
2

			1	2	3	4	5
1	(Malaysia) (Hong Kong)	Mohammad Syafiq Kamal; Wong Chi Him	11; 6	10; 12	8; 11	11; 13
2	(Malaysia) (Hong Kong)	Addeen Idrakie; Lau Tsz Kwan	11; 9	9; 11	7; 11	10; 12
3	(Malaysia) (Hong Kong)	Ng Eain Yow; Henry Leung	11; 4	5; 11	11; 2	11; 5

Japan
3

Court D
1 November 2022

Iran
0

			1	2	3	4	5
1	(Japan) (Iran)	Shota Yasunari; Mohammad Kashani	11; 13	11; 4	11; 5	11; 7
2	(Japan) (Iran)	Naoki Hayashi; Samioolah Ghased Abadi	12; 10	11; 7	11; 8
3	(Japan) (Iran)	Ryunosuke Tsukue; Alireza Shameli	11; 4	8; 11	11; 5	6; 11	11; 4

Iran
3

Court A
2 November 2022

Philippines
0

			1	2	3	4	5
1	(Iran) (Philippines)	Samioolah Ghased Abadi; Reymark Begornia	9; 11	8; 11	12; 10	11; 9	11; 7
2	(Iran) (Philippines)	Mohammad Kashani; David Pelino	11; 2	11; 5	11; 7
3	(Iran) (Philippines)	Alireza Shameli; Robert Garcia	11; 5	5; 11	7; 11	11; 8	11; 6

Hong Kong
3

Grand Court
2 November 2022

Japan
0

			1	2	3	4	5
1	(Hong Kong) (Japan)	Lau Tsz Kwan; Naoki Hayashi	11; 6	6; 11	11; 4	11; 8
2	(Hong Kong) (Japan)	Wong Chi Him; Shota Yasunari	11; 2	11; 2	11; 7
3	(Hong Kong) (Japan)	Henry Leung; Ryunosuke Tsukue	11; 3	11; 6	9; 11	11; 4

Malaysia
3

Court D
2 November 2022

Singapore
0

			1	2	3	4	5
1	(Malaysia) (Singapore)	Mohammad Syafiq Kamal; Marcus Phua	11; 2	11; 4	13; 11
2	(Malaysia) (Singapore)	Ong Sai Hung; Timothy Leong	11; 6	11; 9	11; 4
3	(Malaysia) (Singapore)	Ng Eain Yow; Samuel Kang	11; 6	11; 7	11; 3

== Second round ==
=== Ninth to twelfth places ===
9-12 semifinals
Qatar	1
Philippines	2
Chinese Taipei	0
Singapore	2

Ninth place playoff
Philippines	1
Singapore	2
Eleventh place playoff
Qatar
Chinese Taipei	w/o

==== 9th-12th semifinals ====
Qatar
1

Court A
3 November 2022

Philippines
2

			1	2	3	4	5
1	(Qatar) (Philippines)	Yousef Al-Kubaisi; David Pelino	5; 11	2; 11	6; 11
2	(Qatar) (Philippines)	Abdulla Al-Tamimi; Robert Garcia	11; 7	13; 15	9; 11	11; 5	11; 2
3	(Qatar) (Philippines)	Syed Azlan Amjad; Reymark Begornia	11; 5	8; 11	11; 5	9; 11	8; 11

Chinese Taipei
0

Court B
3 November 2022

Singapore
2

			1	2	3	4	5
1	(Chinese Taipei) (Singapore)	Pan Shao-yu; Marcus Phua	2; 11	2; 11	4; 11
2	(Chinese Taipei) (Singapore)	Huang Cheng-yao; Samuel Kang	8; 11	8; 11	5; 11
3	(Chinese Taipei) (Singapore)	Chen Wun-lin; Aaron Liang						not played

==== 11th place playoff ====
Qatar

Court D
4 November 2022

Chinese Taipei

			1	2	3	4	5
1	(Qatar) (Chinese Taipei)	Syed Azlan Amjad; Chen Wun-lin						w/o
2	(Qatar) (Chinese Taipei)	Ammar Al-Tamimi; Huang Cheng-yao						w/o
3	(Qatar) (Chinese Taipei)	Yousef Al-Kubaisi; Wei Chih-yu						not played

==== 9th place playoff ====
Philippines
1

Court A
4 November 2022

Singapore
2

			1	2	3	4	5
1	(Philippines) (Singapore)	Reymark Begornia; Aaron Liang	13; 15	6; 11	2; 11
2	(Philippines) (Singapore)	Robert Garcia; Samuel Kang	11; 13	8; 11	13; 11	11; 5	11; 9
3	(Philippines) (Singapore)	David Pelino; Marcus Phua	9; 11	5; 11	6; 11

=== Fifth to eighth places ===
5-8 semifinals
Pakistan	2
Iran	0
South Korea	2
Japan	1

Fifth place playoff
Pakistan	2
South Korea	1
Seventh place playoff
Iran	1
Japan	2

==== 5th-8th semifinals ====
Pakistan
2

Grand Court
3 November 2022

Iran
0

			1	2	3	4	5
1	(Pakistan) (Iran)	Farhan Mehboob; Mohammad Kashani	11; 6	11; 1	11; 4
2	(Pakistan) (Iran)	Noor Zaman; Alireza Shameli	5; 11	12; 10	11; 5	12; 10
3	(Pakistan) (Iran)	Hamza Khan; Samioolah Ghased Abadi						not played

South Korea
2

Court D
3 November 2022

Japan
1

			1	2	3	4	5
1	(South Korea) (Japan)	Na Joo-young; Shota Yasunari	13; 15	11; 8	11; 9	11; 6
2	(South Korea) (Japan)	Yoo Jae-jin; Ryunosuke Tsukue	5; 11	9; 11	6; 11
3	(South Korea) (Japan)	Lee Min-woo; Naoki Hayashi	11; 4	9; 11	11; 8	11; 5

==== 7th place playoff ====
Iran
1

Court D
4 November 2022

Japan
2

			1	2	3	4	5
1	(Iran) (Japan)	Samioolah Ghased Abadi; Naoki Hayashi	11; 8	11; 7	10; 12	11; 13	11; 7
2	(Iran) (Japan)	Alireza Shameli; Ryunosuke Tsukue	11; 9	11; 9	4; 11	7; 11	4; 11
3	(Iran) (Japan)	Mohammad Kashani; Shota Yasunari	6; 11	9; 11	6; 11

==== 5th place playoff ====
Pakistan
2

Court A
4 November 2022

South Korea
1

			1	2	3	4	5
1	(Pakistan) (South Korea)	Hamza Khan; Lee Min-woo	7; 11	11; 9	2; 11	7; 11
2	(Pakistan) (South Korea)	Noor Zaman; Yoo Jae-jin	9; 11	11; 7	10; 12	11; 8	11; 6
3	(Pakistan) (South Korea)	Farhan Mehboob; Lee Se-hyun	11; 2	11; 7	11; 4

=== Knockout stage ===
Semifinals
India	2
Malaysia	1
Hong Kong	1
Kuwait	2

Final
India	2
Kuwait	0

==== Semifinals ====
India
2

Grand Court
3 November 2022

Malaysia
1

			1	2	3	4	5
1	(India) (Malaysia)	Abhay Singh; Mohammad Syafiq Kamal	4; 11	11; 9	11; 9	8; 11	11; 9
2	(India) (Malaysia)	Saurav Ghosal; Ng Eain Yow	11; 9	3; 11	8; 11	11; 7	11; 9
3	(India) (Malaysia)	Ramit Tandon; Addeen Idrakie	6; 11	11; 4	11; 7	11; 6

Hong Kong
1

Court A
3 November 2022

Kuwait
2

			1	2	3	4	5
1	(Hong Kong) (Kuwait)	Wong Chi Him; Ali Al-Ramezi	16; 14	11; 5	11; 3
2	(Hong Kong) (Kuwait)	Henry Leung; Ammar Al-Tamimi	5; 11	7; 11	11; 7	12; 14
3	(Hong Kong) (Kuwait)	Lau Tsz Kwan; Abdullah Al-Mezayen	5; 11	6; 11	11; 1	6; 11

==== Final ====
India
2

Grand Court
4 November 2022

Kuwait
0

			1	2	3	4	5
1	(India) (Kuwait)	Ramit Tandon; Ali Al-Ramezi	11; 5	11; 7	11; 4
2	(India) (Kuwait)	Saurav Ghosal; Ammar Al-Tamimi	11; 9	11; 2	11; 3
3	(India) (Kuwait)	Abhay Singh; Falah Mohammad						not played

== Final rankings ==
Position	Team
1st place, gold medalist(s)	India
2nd place, silver medalist(s)	Kuwait
3rd place, bronze medalist(s)	Hong Kong
3rd place, bronze medalist(s)	Malaysia
5th	Pakistan
6th	South Korea
7th	Japan
8th	Iran
9th	Singapore
10th	Philippines
11th	Chinese Taipei
12th	Qatar

Draws:

Matches:

Players:

Result:

== See also ==
- Asian Team Squash Championships
- 2022 Women's Asian Squash Team Championships

Preceded by Kuala Lumpur; 2021	Asian Team Squash Championships; Cheongju (South Korea); 2022	Succeeded by 2024
