= Poland men's national squash team =

Poland
- Association: Polish Squash Federation

World Team Championships
- First year: 2013
- Titles: 0
- Runners-up: 0
- Best finish: 27th
- Entries: 1

European Team Championships
- Titles: 0
- Runners-up: 0

The Poland men's national squash team represents Poland in international squash team competitions, and is governed by Polish Squash Federation.

== Current team ==
- Wojtek Nowisz
- Marcin Karwowski
- Przemyslaw Atras
- Lukasz Stachowski

== Results ==
=== World Team Squash Championships ===
| Year | Result | Position | W | L |
|---|---|---|---|---|
| (Australia) Melbourne 1967 | Did not present | | | |
| (England) Birmingham 1969 | Did not present | | | |
| (New Zealand) Palmerston North 1971 | Did not present | | | |
| (South Africa) Johannesburg 1973 | Did not present | | | |
| (England) Birmingham 1976 | Did not present | | | |
| (Canada) Toronto 1977 | Did not present | | | |
| (Australia) Brisbane 1979 | Did not present | | | |
| (Sweden) Stockholm 1981 | Did not present | | | |
| (New Zealand) Auckland 1983 | Did not present | | | |
| (Egypt) Cairo 1985 | Did not present | | | |
| (England) London 1987 | Did not present | | | |
| Singapore 1989 | Did not present | | | |
| (Finland) Helsinki 1991 | Did not present | | | |
| (Pakistan) Karachi 1993 | Did not present | | | |
| (Egypt) Cairo 1995 | Did not present | | | |
| (Malaysia) Petaling Jaya 1997 | Did not present | | | |
| (Egypt) Cairo 1999 | Did not present | | | |
| (Australia) Melbourne 2001 | Did not present | | | |
| (Austria) Vienna 2003 | Did not present | | | |
| (Pakistan) Islamabad 2005 | Did not present | | | |
| (India) Chennai 2007 | Did not present | | | |
| (Denmark) Odense 2009 | Did not present | | | |
| (Germany) Paderborn 2011 | Did not present | | | |
| (France) Mulhouse 2013 | Group Stage | 27th | 2 | 5 |
| (Egypt) Cairo 2015 | Cancelled | | | |
| (France) Marseille 2017 | Did not present | | | |
| (United States) Washington, D.C. 2019 | Did not present | | | |
| Total | 1/26 | 0 Title | 2 | 5 |

=== European Squash Team Championships ===
| Year | Result | Position |
|---|---|---|
| (Scotland) Edinburgh 1973 | Not in the Top 4 | |
| (Sweden) Stockholm 1974 | Not in the Top 4 | |
| (Republic of Ireland) Dublin 1975 | Not in the Top 4 | |
| (Belgium) Brussels 1976 | Not in the Top 4 | |
| (England) Sheffield 1977 | Not in the Top 4 | |
| (Netherlands) Amsterdam 1978 | Not in the Top 4 | |
| (Germany) Hamburg 1979 | Not in the Top 4 | |
| (Finland) Helsinki 1980 | Not in the Top 4 | |
| (Netherlands) Amsterdam 1981 | Not in the Top 4 | |
| (Wales) Cardiff 1982 | Not in the Top 4 | |
| (Germany) Munich 1983 | Not in the Top 4 | |
| (Republic of Ireland) Dublin 1984 | Not in the Top 4 | |
| (Spain) Barcelona 1985 | Not in the Top 4 | |
| (France) Aix-en-Provence 1986 | Not in the Top 4 | |
| (Austria) Vienna 1987 | Not in the Top 4 | |
| (Netherlands) Warmond 1988 | Not in the Top 4 | |
| (Finland) Helsinki 1989 | Not in the Top 4 | |
| (Switzerland) Zürich 1990 | Not in the Top 4 | |
| (Germany) Gelsenkirchen 1991 | Not in the Top 4 | |
| (France) Aix-en-Provence 1992 | Not in the Top 4 | |
| (France) Aix-en-Provence 1993 | Not in the Top 4 | |
| (Germany) Zoetermeer 1994 | Not in the Top 4 | |
| (Netherlands) Amsterdam 1995 | Not in the Top 4 | |
| (Netherlands) Amsterdam 1996 | Not in the Top 4 | |
| (Denmark) Odense 1997 | Not in the Top 4 | |
| (Finland) Helsinki 1998 | Not in the Top 4 | |
| (Austria) Linz 1999 | Not in the Top 4 | |
| (Austria) Vienna 2000 | Not in the Top 4 | |
| (Netherlands) Eindhoven 2001 | Not in the Top 4 | |
| (Germany) Böblingen 2002 | Not in the Top 4 | |
| (England) Nottingham 2003 | Not in the Top 4 | |
| (France) Rennes 2004 | Not in the Top 4 | |
| (Netherlands) Amsterdam 2005 | Not in the Top 4 | |
| (Austria) Vienna 2006 | Not in the Top 4 | |
| (Italy) Riccione 2007 | Not in the Top 4 | |
| (Netherlands) Amsterdam 2008 | Not in the Top 4 | |
| (Sweden) Malmö 2009 | Not in the Top 4 | |
| (France) Aix-en-Provence 2010 | Not in the Top 4 | |
| (Finland) Espoo 2011 | Not in the Top 4 | |
| (Germany) Nuremberg 2012 | Not in the Top 4 | |
| (Netherlands) Amsterdam 2013 | Not in the Top 4 | |
| (Italy) Riccione 2014 | Not in the Top 4 | |
| (Denmark) Herning 2015 | Not in the Top 4 | |
| (Poland) Warsaw 2016 | Not in the Top 4 | |
| (Finland) Helsinki 2017 | Not in the Top 4 | |
| (Poland) Wrocław 2018 | Not in the Top 4 | |
| (England) Birmingham 2019 | Not in the Top 4 | |
| Total | / | |

== See also ==
- Polish Squash Federation
- World Team Squash Championships
