= Mexico men's national squash team =

Mexico
- Coach: Miguel Montero Villanueva
- Association: Mexico Squash Federation
- Colors: Green & White

World Team Championships
- First year: 1997
- Titles: 0
- Runners-up: 0
- Best finish: 15th
- Entries: 5

The Mexico men's national squash team represents Mexico in international squash team competitions, and is governed by Mexico Squash Federation.

Since 1997, Mexico has participated in two round of 16 of the World Squash Team Open.

== Current team ==
- Cesar Salazar
- Arturo Salazar
- Leonel Cárdenas
- Alfredo Ávila

== Results ==
=== World Team Squash Championships ===
Year	Result	Position	W	L
(Australia) Melbourne 1967	Did not present			
(England) Birmingham 1969	Did not present			
(New Zealand) Palmerston North 1971	Did not present			
(South Africa) Johannesburg 1973	Did not present			
(England) Birmingham 1976	Did not present			
(Canada) Toronto 1977	Did not present			
(Australia) Brisbane 1979	Did not present			
(Sweden) Stockholm 1981	Did not present			
(New Zealand) Auckland 1983	Did not present			
(Egypt) Cairo 1985	Did not present			
(England) London 1987	Did not present			
Singapore 1989	Did not present			
(Finland) Helsinki 1991	Did not present			
(Pakistan) Karachi 1993	Did not present			
(Egypt) Cairo 1995	Did not present			
(Malaysia) Petaling Jaya 1997	Group Stage	26th	3	3
(Egypt) Cairo 1999	Did not present			
(Australia) Melbourne 2001	Group Stage	21st	2	4
(Austria) Vienna 2003	Group Stage	29th	2	4
(Pakistan) Islamabad 2005	Did not present			
(India) Chennai 2007	Did not present			
(Denmark) Odense 2009	Did not present			
(Germany) Paderborn 2011	Round of 16	15th	2	5
(France) Mulhouse 2013	Round of 16	16th	1	5
(Egypt) Cairo 2015	Cancelled			
(France) Marseille 2017	Did not present			
(United States) Washington, D.C. 2019	Did not present			
Total	5/26	0 Title	10	21

== See also ==
- Mexico Squash Federation
- World Team Squash Championships
- Mexico women's national squash team
