= Wiegandt =

Family name

Wiegandt is a surname and may refer to:

- Ardell Wiegandt (born 1940), Canadian football coach
- Axel Wiegandt (1888–1947), Swedish runner
- Jan Wiegandt, Band member, see List of Red Warszawa band members
- Morten Wiegandt Sørensen (born 1979), Danish squash player
- Patrick Von Wiegandt, American engineer
- Scott Wiegandt, Athletic Director and baseball player
