= Argentina men's national squash team =

Argentina
- Coach: Marcelo Romiglio
- Association: Argentina Squash Rackets Association
- Colors: Blue

World Team Championships
- First year: 1993
- Titles: 0
- Runners-up: 0
- Best finish: 13th
- Entries: 8

The Argentina men's national squash team represents the Argentina in international squash team competitions, and is governed by Argentina Squash Rackets Association.

== Current team ==
- Leandro Romiglio
- Robertino Pezzota
- Juan Pablo Roude
- Rodrigo Obregón

== Results ==
World Team Squash Championships

| Year | Result | Position | W | L |
|---|---|---|---|---|
| (Australia) Melbourne 1967 | Did not present | | | |
| (England) Birmingham 1969 | Did not present | | | |
| (New Zealand) Palmerston North 1971 | Did not present | | | |
| (South Africa) Johannesburg 1973 | Did not present | | | |
| (England) Birmingham 1976 | Did not present | | | |
| (Canada) Toronto 1977 | Did not present | | | |
| (Australia) Brisbane 1979 | Did not present | | | |
| (Sweden) Stockholm 1981 | Did not present | | | |
| (New Zealand) Auckland 1983 | Did not present | | | |
| (Egypt) Cairo 1985 | Did not present | | | |
| (England) London 1987 | Did not present | | | |
| Singapore 1989 | Did not present | | | |
| (Finland) Helsinki 1991 | Did not present | | | |
| (Pakistan) Karachi 1993 | Group Stage | 24th | 0 | 4 |
| (Egypt) Cairo 1995 | Group Stage | 13th | 5 | 1 |
| (Malaysia) Petaling Jaya 1997 | Group Stage | 20th | 1 | 5 |
| (Egypt) Cairo 1999 | Group Stage | 23rd | 2 | 1 |
| (Australia) Melbourne 2001 | Did not present | | | |
| (Austria) Vienna 2003 | Did not present | | | |
| (Pakistan) Islamabad 2005 | Did not present | | | |
| (India) Chennai 2007 | Did not present | | | |
| (Denmark) Odense 2009 | Did not present | | | |
| (Germany) Paderborn 2011 | Group Stage | 23rd | 2 | 5 |
| (France) Mulhouse 2013 | Group Stage | 20th | 3 | 4 |
| (Egypt) Cairo 2015 | Cancelled | | | |
| (France) Marseille 2017 | Group Stage | 17th | 3 | 2 |
| (United States) Washington, D.C. 2019 | Group Stage | 16th | 2 | 4 |
| Total | 8/25 | 0 Title | 18 | 26 |

== See also ==
- Argentina Squash Rackets Association
- World Team Squash Championships
