= Kuwait men's national squash team =

Kuwait
- Coach: Nasser Sayed Zahran Mohamed
- Association: Kuwait Squash Federation
- Colors: Blue & White

World Team Championships
- First year: 1976
- Titles: 0
- Runners-up: 0
- Best finish: 10th
- Entries: 19

Asian Team Championships
- Titles: 0
- Runners-up: 2
- Best finish: 2nd

The Kuwait men's national squash team represents Kuwait in international squash team competitions, and is governed by Kuwait Squash Federation.

Since 1976, Kuwait has participated in one round of 16 of the World Squash Team Open, in 2009.

== Current team ==
- Ammar Al-Tamimi
- Abdullah Al-Muzayen

== Results ==
=== World Team Squash Championships ===
Year	Result	Position	W	L
(Australia) Melbourne 1967	Did not present			
(England) Birmingham 1969	Did not present			
(New Zealand) Palmerston North 1971	Did not present			
(South Africa) Johannesburg 1973	Did not present			
(England) Birmingham 1976	Group Stage	10th	0	7
(Canada) Toronto 1977	Did not present			
(Australia) Brisbane 1979	Group Stage	14th	0	8
(Sweden) Stockholm 1981	Group Stage	18th	1	5
(New Zealand) Auckland 1983	Group Stage	18th	1	5
(Egypt) Cairo 1985	Group Stage	20th	0	7
(England) London 1987	Group Stage	24th	2	9
Singapore 1989	Group Stage	21st	4	4
(Finland) Helsinki 1991	Group Stage	21st	3	2
(Pakistan) Karachi 1993	Group Stage	27th	1	3
(Egypt) Cairo 1995	Group Stage	29th	3	3
(Malaysia) Petaling Jaya 1997	Group Stage	28th	2	4
(Egypt) Cairo 1999	Group Stage	27th	3	3
(Australia) Melbourne 2001	Did not present			
(Austria) Vienna 2003	Group Stage	19th	3	4
(Pakistan) Islamabad 2005	Group Stage	16th	2	4
(India) Chennai 2007	Group Stage	22nd	3	4
(Denmark) Odense 2009	Round of 16	15th	3	4
(Germany) Paderborn 2011	Group Stage	18th	4	3
(France) Mulhouse 2013	Group Stage	19th	3	3
(Egypt) Cairo 2015	Cancelled			
(France) Marseille 2017	Did not present			
(United States) Washington, D.C. 2019	Group Stage	15th	3	3
Total	19/24	0 Title	41	85

=== Asian Squash Team Championships ===
Year	Result	Position
(Pakistan) Karachi 1981	Not in the Top 4	
(Jordan) Amman 1984	Not in the Top 4	
(Malaysia) Kuala Lumpur 1986	Not in the Top 4	
Kuwait City 1988	Not in the Top 4	
(India) Kolkata 1990	Semi Final	4th
(Pakistan) Peshawar 1992	Not in the Top 4	
(Malaysia) Kuala Lumpur 1994	Not in the Top 4	
(Jordan) Amman 1996	Not in the Top 4	
(Malaysia) Kuala Lumpur 1998	Not in the Top 4	
Hong Kong 2000	Not in the Top 4	
(Malaysia) Kuala Lumpur 2002	Not in the Top 4	
(Malaysia) Kuala Lumpur 2004	Semi Final	4th
(Chinese Taipei) Taiwan 2006	Semi Final	3rd
Kuwait City 2008	Final	2nd
(India) Chennai 2010	Semi Final	4th
Kuwait City 2012	Semi Final	3rd
Hong Kong 2014	Semi Final	3rd
(Chinese Taipei) Taiwan 2016	Not in the Top 4	
(South Korea) Cheongju 2018	Not in the Top 4	
(Malaysia) Kuala Lumpur 2021	Did not participate	
(South Korea) Cheongju 2022	Final	2nd
Total	x2 - x3	

== See also ==
- Kuwait Squash Federation
- World Team Squash Championships
