= 2013 Men's World Team Squash Championships =

Men's World Team 2013
- 24th WSF World Men's Team Championship
- Location: Mulhouse, France
- Venue: Palais des Sports, Mulhouse
- Date: June 9–16, 2013
- Teams: 31 (from all the 5 confederations)
- Website worldmensquash-mulhouse2013.fr/en

Results
- Champions: England
- Runners-up: Egypt
- Third place: France

The 2013 Men's World Team Squash Championships is the men's edition of the 2013 World Team Squash Championships, which serves as the world team championship for squash players. The event was held in Mulhouse, France, from June 9 to June 15, 2013. The tournament is organized by the World Squash Federation and the French Squash Federation. The England team won its fifth World Team Championships beating the Egyptian team in the final.

== Participating teams ==
A total of 31 teams competed from all the five confederations: Africa, America, Asia, Europe and Oceania. For Botswana and Poland, it was their first participation at a world team championship.

Africa (SFA)	America (FPS)	Asia (ASF)	Europe (ESF)	Oceania (OSF)	Map
Botswana; Egypt (Title Holder); Kenya; Namibia; South Africa	Argentina; Canada; Colombia; Mexico; United States; Venezuela	Hong Kong; India; Japan; Kuwait; Malaysia; Pakistan	Austria; Czech Republic; England; France (Host Country); Finland; Germany; Ireland; Netherlands; Poland; Scotland; Switzerland; Russia	Australia; New Zealand	Map of the participating nations

== Seeds ==
1. Egypt (final)
2. England (champion)
3. France (semifinals)
4. Australia (semifinals)
5. Malaysia (quarterfinals)
6. Germany (quarterfinals)
7. South Africa (quarterfinals)
8. India (quarterfinals)
9. Finland (round of 16)
10. Hong Kong (round of 16)
11. United States (round of 16)
12. New Zealand (round of 16)
13. Mexico (round of 16)
14. Pakistan (round of 16)
15. Canada (round of 16)
16. Scotland (round of 16)

== Squads ==
Egypt

- Ramy Ashour
- Karim Darwish
- Omar Mosaad
- Tarek Momen

Scotland

- Alan Clyne
- Greg Lobban
- Douglas Kempsell
- Chris Small

Kuwait

- Abdullah Al Muzayen
- Ammar Altamimi
- Yousif Nizar Saleh
- Omar Al Jamaan

Kenya

- Maina Kenneth Mwang
- Hartaj Bains
- Rajdeep Bains
- Joseph Ndungu

England

- Nick Matthew
- James Willstrop
- Daryl Selby
- Adrian Grant

Canada

- Shawn Delierre
- Dane Sharp
- Andrew Schnell
- David Letourneau

Colombia

- Miguel Ángel Rodríguez
- Erick Herrera
- Bernardo Samper
- Andrés Vargas

Namibia

- Marco Becker
- Norbert Dorgeloh
- Andrew Forrest
- Daniel Gruff

France

- Grégory Gaultier
- Thierry Lincou
- Mathieu Castagnet
- Grégoire Marche

Pakistan

- Nasir Iqbal
- Farhan Zaman
- Farhan Mehboob
- Saqib Yousaf

Netherlands

- Laurens Jan Anjema
- Sebastiaan Weenink
- Bart Ravelli
- Marc Ter Sluis

Russia

- Valeri Litvinko
- Alexander Shilov
- Dmitri Grishanin
- Sergei Beljaev

Australia

- Cameron Pilley
- David Palmer
- Ryan Cuskelly
- Matthew Karwalski

Mexico

- Arturo Salazar
- César Salazar
- Eric Gálvez
- Not Used

Switzerland

- Nicolas Müller
- Reiko Peter
- Jonas Daehler
- Patrick Miescher

Malaysia

- Ong Beng Hee
- Mohd Nafiizwan Adnan
- Muhd Asyraf Azan
- Sanjay Singh

New Zealand

- Campbell Grayson
- Martin Knight
- Evan Williams
- Paul Coll

Botswana

- Alister Walker
- Lekgotla Mosope
- Jason Boyle
- Theo Pelonomi

Poland

- Wojtek Nowisz
- Marcin Karwowski
- Przemyslaw Atras
- Lukasz Stachowski

Germany

- Simon Rösner
- Raphael Kandra
- Jens Schoor
- Andre Haschker

United States

- Chris Gordon
- Julian Illingworth
- Gilly Lane
- Dylan Murray

(Republic of Ireland) Ireland

- Arthur Gaskin
- Derek Ryan
- Brian O'Brion
- Steve Richardson

Czech Republic

- Ondrej Ertl
- Petr Martin
- Ondrej Uherka
- Daniel Mekbib

South Africa

- Steve Coppinger
- Shaun Le Roux
- Clinton Leeuw
- Rodney Durbach

Hong Kong

- Max Lee
- Leo Au
- Tsz Fung Yip
- Cheuk Yan Tang

Austria

- Aqeel Rehman
- Jakob Dirnberger
- Andreas Freudensprung
- Marcus Greslehner

Japan

- Shinnosuke Tsukue
- Yuta Fukui
- Ryosei Kobayashi
- Tomotaka Endo

India

- Saurav Ghosal
- Harinder Pal Sandhu
- Ramit Tandon
- Mahesh Mangaonkar

Finland

- Olli Tuominen
- Henrik Mustonen
- Matias Tuomi
- Mika Monto

Argentina

- Hernán D'Arcangelo
- Rodrigo Pezzota
- Juan Pablo Roude
- Leandro Romiglio

Venezuela

- Gabriel Teran
- Miguel Mendez
- Miguel Vallennilla
- Ricardo Teran

== Group stage ==
=== Pool A ===
June 9, 2013

Egypt	3	-	0	Kuwait
Scotland	3	–	0	Kenya

June 10, 2013

Egypt	3	-	0	Scotland
Kuwait	3	–	0	Kenya

June 11, 2013

Egypt	3	-	0	Kenya
Scotland	3	–	0	Kuwait

Rank	Nation	Match	Won	Lost	Points
1	Egypt	3	3	0	6
2	Scotland	3	2	1	4
3	Kuwait	3	1	2	2
4	Kenya	3	0	3	0

=== Pool B ===
June 9, 2013

England	3	-	0	Colombia
Canada	3	–	0	Namibia

June 10, 2013

England	3	-	0	Canada
Colombia	3	–	0	Namibia

June 11, 2013

England	3	-	0	Namibia
Canada	2	–	1	Colombia

Rank	Nation	Match	Won	Lost	Points
1	England	3	3	0	6
2	Canada	3	2	1	4
3	Colombia	3	1	2	2
4	Namibia	3	0	3	0

=== Pool C ===
June 9, 2013

France	3	-	0	Netherlands
Pakistan	3	–	0	Russia

June 10, 2013

France	3	-	0	Pakistan
Netherlands	3	–	0	Russia

June 11, 2013

France	3	-	0	Russia
Pakistan	2	–	1	Netherlands

Rank	Nation	Match	Won	Lost	Points
1	France	3	3	0	6
2	Pakistan	3	2	1	4
3	Netherlands	3	1	2	2
4	Russia	3	0	3	0

=== Pool D ===
June 9, 2013

Australia	3	-	0	Switzerland

June 10, 2013

Australia	3	-	0	Mexico

June 11, 2013

Mexico	3	-	0	Switzerland

Rank	Nation	Match	Win	Low	Points
1	Australia	2	2	0	4
2	Mexico	2	1	1	2
3	Switzerland	2	0	2	0

=== Pool E ===
June 9, 2013

Malaysia	2	-	1	Botswana
New Zealand	3	–	0	Poland

June 10, 2013

Malaysia	3	-	0	New Zealand
Botswana	2	–	1	Poland

June 11, 2013

Malaysia	3	-	0	Poland
New Zealand	2	–	1	Botswana

Rank	Nation	Match	Won	Lost	Points
1	Malaysia	3	3	0	6
2	New Zealand	3	2	1	4
3	Botswana	3	1	2	2
4	Poland	3	0	3	0

=== Pool F ===
June 9, 2013

Germany	3	-	0	(Republic of Ireland) Ireland
United States	3	–	0	Czech Republic

June 10, 2013

Germany	2	-	1	United States
(Republic of Ireland) Ireland	2	–	1	Czech Republic

June 11, 2013

Germany	3	-	0	Czech Republic
United States	2	–	1	(Republic of Ireland) Ireland

Rank	Nation	Match	Won	Lost	Points
1	Germany	3	3	0	6
2	United States	3	2	1	4
3	(Republic of Ireland) Ireland	3	1	2	2
4	Czech Republic	3	0	3	0

=== Pool G ===
June 9, 2013

South Africa	3	-	0	Austria
Hong Kong	3	–	0	Japan

June 10, 2013

South Africa	3	-	0	Hong Kong
Austria	1	–	2	Japan

June 11, 2013

South Africa	3	-	0	Japan
Hong Kong	3	–	0	Austria

Rank	Nation	Match	Won	Lost	Points
1	South Africa	3	3	0	6
2	Hong Kong	3	2	1	4
3	Japan	3	1	2	2
4	Austria	3	0	3	0

=== Pool H ===
June 9, 2013

India	2	-	1	Argentina
Finland	3	–	0	Venezuela

June 10, 2013

India	3	-	0	Finland
Argentina	3	–	0	Venezuela

June 11, 2013

India	3	-	0	Venezuela
Finland	2	–	1	Argentina

Rank	Nation	Match	Won	Lost	Points
1	India	3	3	0	6
2	Finland	3	2	1	4
3	Argentina	3	1	2	2
4	Venezuela	3	0	3	0

== Finals ==
=== Draw ===
Poster of Men's World Squash Team 2013

Round of 16
1	Egypt	3	3
15	Canada	0	0
8	India	3	3	1
10	Hong Kong	1	0	2
4	Australia	3	3	2
14	Pakistan	1	0	0
6	Germany	1	3	1
12	New Zealand	0^{r}	0	2
11	United States	1	1
5	Malaysia	3	3
13	Mexico	0	0	0
3	France	3	3	2
9	Finland	0	0
7	South Africa	3	3
16	Scotland	0	0	0
2	England	3	3	2

Quarterfinals
1	Egypt	3	3
8	India	0	1
4	Australia	3	3
6	Germany	0	0
5	Malaysia	1	0	0
3	France	3	3	2
7	South Africa	0	0	0
2	England	3	3	2

Semifinals
1	Egypt	1	3	3
4	Australia	3	1	2
3	France	2	1
2	England	3	3

Final
1	Egypt	0	3	1
2	England	3	1	3

Third place match
4	Australia	2	0
3	France	3	3

=== Results ===
==== Quarterfinals ====
Egypt
2
Quarterfinal
Mulhouse, France
13 June 2013
Central Glass Court

India
0

			1	2	3	4	5
1	(Egypt) (India)	N°2 Karim Darwish; N°2 Harinder Pal Sandhu	11; 7	11; 4	11; 2
2	(Egypt) (India)	N°1 Ramy Ashour; N°1 Saurav Ghosal	11; 7	11; 9	4; 11	13; 11
3	(Egypt) (India)	N°3 Tarek Momen; N°3 Mahesh Mangaonkar

Australia
2
Quarterfinal
Mulhouse, France
13 June 2013
Central Glass Court

Germany
0

			1	2	3	4	5
1	(Australia) (Germany)	N°2 David Palmer; N°2 Raphael Kandra	11; 9	11; 4	13; 11
2	(Australia) (Germany)	N°1 Cameron Pilley; N°1 Simon Rösner	11; 3	14; 12	11; 5
3	(Australia) (Germany)	N°3 Ryan Cuskelly; N°3 Jens Schoor

Malaysia
0
Quarterfinal
Mulhouse, France
13 June 2013
Central Glass Court

France
3

			1	2	3	4	5
1	(Malaysia) (France)	N°2 Mohd Nafiizwan Adnan; N°2 Thierry Lincou	6; 11	11; 8	7; 11	7; 11
2	(Malaysia) (France)	N°1 Ong Beng Hee; N°1 Grégory Gaultier	6; 11	6; 11	5; 11
3	(Malaysia) (France)	N°3 Sanjay Singh; N°3 Grégoire Marche	3; 11	3; 11

South Africa
0
Quarterfinal
Mulhouse, France
13 June 2013
Glass Court N°3

England
3

			1	2	3	4	5
1	(South Africa) (England)	N°2 Shaun Le Roux; N°2 James Willstrop	7; 11	6; 11	8; 11
2	(South Africa) (England)	N°1 Steve Coppinger; N°1 Nick Matthew	4; 11	4; 11	7; 11
3	(South Africa) (England)	N°3 Rodney Durbach; N°3 Daryl Selby	7; 11	6; 11

==== Semifinals ====
Egypt
2
Semifinal
Mulhouse, France
14 June 2013
Central Glass Court

Australia
1

			1	2	3	4	5
1	(Egypt) (Australia)	N°1 Karim Darwish; N°1 Cameron Pilley	12; 10	14; 16	10; 12	9; 11
2	(Egypt) (Australia)	N°2 Omar Mosaad; N°2 David Palmer	11; 13	11; 6	11; 9	11; 9
3	(Egypt) (Australia)	N°3 Tarek Momen; N°3 Ryan Cuskelly	3; 11	11; 6	11; 5	7; 11	11; 5

France
0
Semifinal
Mulhouse, France
14 June 2013
Central Glass Court

England
2

			1	2	3	4	5
1	(France) (England)	N°1 Grégory Gaultier; N°1 Nick Matthew	11; 5	9; 11	11; 9	5; 11	10; 12
2	(France) (England)	N°2 Thierry Lincou; N°2 James Willstrop	3; 11	8; 11	11; 7	11; 13
3	(France) (England)	N°3 Mathieu Castagnet; N°3 Daryl Selby

==== Final ====
Egypt
1
Final
Mulhouse, France
15 June 2013
Central Glass Court

England
2

			1	2	3	4	5
1	(Egypt) (England)	N°3 Tarek Momen; N°3 Daryl Selby	5; 11	3; 11	7; 11
2	(Egypt) (England)	N°1 Ramy Ashour; N°1 Nick Matthew	5; 11	11; 6	11; 9	11; 9
3	(Egypt) (England)	N°2 Karim Darwish; N°2 James Willstrop	3; 11	13; 11	3; 11	4; 11

2013 WSF World Team Championship

England
5th title

Team
Nick Matthew – James Willstrop – Daryl Selby – Adrian Grant

== Post-tournament team ranking ==
Position	Team	Result
1st	England	Champions
2nd	Egypt	Final
3rd	France	Semifinal
4th	Australia	Semifinal
5th	Germany	Quarterfinal
6th	South Africa	Quarterfinal
7th	India	Quarterfinal
8th	Malaysia	Quarterfinal

Position	Team	Result
9th	Scotland	Round of 16
10th	Pakistan	Round of 16
11th	Canada	Round of 16
12th	United States	Round of 16
13th	Hong Kong	Round of 16
14th	Finland	Round of 16
15th	New Zealand	Round of 16
16th	Mexico	Round of 16

Position	Team	Result
17th	Switzerland	Group Stage
18th	Netherlands	Group Stage
19th	Kuwait	Group Stage
20th	Argentina	Group Stage
21st	Colombia	Group Stage
22nd	Japan	Group Stage
23rd	(Republic of Ireland) Ireland	Group Stage
24th	Botswana	Group Stage

Position	Team	Result
25th	Czech Republic	Group Stage
26th	Kenya	Group Stage
27th	Poland	Group Stage
28th	Russia	Group Stage
29th	Austria	Group Stage
30th	Venezuela	Group Stage
31st	Namibia	Group Stage

== See also ==
- World Team Squash Championships
- World Squash Federation
- 2013 Men's World Open Squash Championship

Preceded by Germany (Paderborn); 2011	Squash World Team; France (Mulhouse); 2013	Succeeded by Cairo (Egypt); 2015
