= South Africa national squash team =

South Africa national squash team may refer to:

- South Africa men's national squash team
- South Africa women's national squash team
