= South Africa men's national squash team =

South Africa
- Coach: Richard Castle
- Association: Squash South Africa
- Colors: Green and Gold

World Team Championships
- First year: 1967
- Titles: 0
- Runners-up: 0
- Best finish: 3rd
- Entries: 16

The South Africa men's national squash team represents South Africa in international squash team competitions, and is governed by Squash South Africa.

Since 1967, South Africa has won two Bronze medals of the World Squash Team Open.

== Current team ==
- Dewald van Niekerk
- Jean-Pierre Brits
- Christo Potgieter
- Tristen Worth

== Results ==
=== World Team Squash Championships ===
Year	Result	Position	W	L
(Australia) Melbourne 1967	Group Stage	4th	2	3
(England) Birmingham 1969	Group Stage	3rd	2	3
(New Zealand) Palmerston North 1971	Did not present			
(South Africa) Johannesburg 1973	Group Stage	3rd	2	2
(England) Birmingham 1976	Did not present			
(Canada) Toronto 1977	Did not present			
(Australia) Brisbane 1979	Did not present			
(Sweden) Stockholm 1981	Did not present			
(New Zealand) Auckland 1983	Did not present			
(Egypt) Cairo 1985	Did not present			
(England) London 1987	Did not present			
Singapore 1989	Did not present			
(Finland) Helsinki 1991	Did not present			
(Pakistan) Karachi 1993	Group Stage	13th	5	0
(Egypt) Cairo 1995	Quarter Final	5th	4	2
(Malaysia) Petaling Jaya 1997	Quarter Final	5th	5	1
(Egypt) Cairo 1999	Quarter Final	8th	3	3
(Australia) Melbourne 2001	Quarter Final	6th	5	2
(Austria) Vienna 2003	Round of 16	10th	4	3
(Pakistan) Islamabad 2005	Round of 16	9th	4	2
(India) Chennai 2007	Round of 16	11th	4	3
(Denmark) Odense 2009	Quarter Final	6th	5	2
(Germany) Paderborn 2011	Round of 16	13th	3	4
(France) Mulhouse 2013	Quarter Final	6th	5	2
(Egypt) Cairo 2015	Cancelled			
(France) Marseille 2017	Group Stage	18th	2	3
(United States) Washington, D.C. 2019	Group Stage	19th	2	5
Total	16/26	0 Title	57	40

== See also ==
- Squash South Africa
- World Team Squash Championships
- South Africa women's national squash team
