= United States men's national junior squash team =

- Coach: Luke Butterworth
- Association: U.S. Squash
- Colors: Red, Blue & White

Medal record

World Junior Team Championships
Bronze medal – third place	2016 Bielsko-Biała	Team
Bronze medal – third place	2018 Chennai	Team
Bronze medal – third place	2024 Houston	Team

The United States men's national junior squash team represents the United States in international squash junior team competitions, and is governed by U.S. Squash.

Since 1984, the United States won three bronze medals of the World Junior Team Championships.

== Current team ==
The following players represented the U.S. in the World Junior Squash Team Championships 2024.

- Rishi Srivastava
- Zane Patel
- Rustin Wiser
- Alexander Dartnell
- Oscar Okonkwo
- Nathan Rosezwieg

== Results ==
=== World Junior Squash Team Championships ===
Year	Result	Position	W	L
1973	Did not participated			
1974	Did not participated			
1975	Did not participated			
1976	Did not participated			
1977	Did not participated			
1978	Did not participated			
1979	Did not participated			
1980	Did not participated			
1982	Did not participated			
(Canada) Calgary 1984	Round of 16	10th		
(Australia) Brisbane 1986	Round of 16	14th		
(Scotland) Edinburgh 1988	Group stage	18th		
(Germany) Paderborn 1990	Group stage	19th		
Hong Kong 1992	Group stage	20th		
(New Zealand) Christchurch 1994	Group stage	21st		
(Egypt) Cairo 1996	Round of 16	15th		
(United States) Princeton 1998	Group stage	20th		
(Italy) Milan 2000	Group stage	17th		
(India) Chennai 2002	Quarterfinals	7th		
(Pakistan) Islamabad 2004	Round of 16	14th		
(New Zealand) Palmerston North 2006	Round of 16	13th		
(Switzerland) Zurich 2008	Round of 16	10th		
(Ecuador) Quito 2010	Round of 16	12th		
(Qatar) Doha 2012	Quarterfinals	8th	4	1
(Namibia) Windhoek 2014	Round of 16	9th	2	2
(Poland) Bielsko-Biała 2016	Third place	3rd place, bronze medalist(s)	5	1
(India) Chennai 2018	Third place	3rd place, bronze medalist(s)	3	2
2020	Cancelled due to COVID-19 pandemic in Australia.			
(France) Nancy 2022	Quarterfinals	7th	2	2
(United States) Houston 2024	Third place	3rd place, bronze medalist(s)	4	1
Total	0 Title	20/23		
