= Hong Kong men's national squash team =

Hong Kong
- Coach: Peter Genever
- Association: Hong Kong Squash
- Colors: White & Red

World Team Championships
- First year: 1979
- Titles: 0
- Runners-up: 0
- Best finish: 3rd
- Entries: 17

Asian Team Championships
- Titles: 1
- Runners-up: 3
- Best finish: 1st

The Hong Kong men's national squash team represents Hong Kong in international squash team competitions, and is governed by Hong Kong Squash.

Since 1979, Hong Kong has participated in one quarter final of the World Squash Team Open, in 2003.

== Current team ==
- Leung Chi Hin Henry
- Lau Tsz Kwan Alex
- Wong Chi Him
- Tang Ming Hong
- Lam Yat Ting, Harley

== Former Team Members ==
- Dick Lau
- Leo Au
- Lee Ho Yin Max
- Yip Tsz Fung
- Kwong Yu Shun Anson
- Chris Lo
- Wong Wai Hang
- Abdul Faheem Khan
- Tony Choi

== Results ==
=== World Team Squash Championships ===
Year	Result	Position	W	L
(Australia) Melbourne 1967	Did not present			
(England) Birmingham 1969	Did not present			
(New Zealand) Palmerston North 1971	Did not present			
(South Africa) Johannesburg 1973	Did not present			
(England) Birmingham 1976	Did not present			
(Canada) Toronto 1977	Did not present			
(Australia) Brisbane 1979	Group Stage	13th	1	6
(Sweden) Stockholm 1981	Did not present			
(New Zealand) Auckland 1983	Group Stage	19th	0	6
(Egypt) Cairo 1985	Did not present			
(England) London 1987	Did not present			
Singapore 1989	Group Stage	20th	3	5
(Finland) Helsinki 1991	Group Stage	18th	3	3
(Pakistan) Karachi 1993	Group Stage	21st	3	1
(Egypt) Cairo 1995	Group Stage	14th	4	2
(Malaysia) Petaling Jaya 1997	Group Stage	24th	1	5
(Egypt) Cairo 1999	Group Stage	20th	3	3
(Australia) Melbourne 2001	Group Stage	18th	3	3
(Austria) Vienna 2003	Quarter Final	8th	3	4
(Pakistan) Islamabad 2005	Group Stage	21st	1	3
(India) Chennai 2007	Round of 16	15th	2	4
(Denmark) Odense 2009	Group Stage	17th	4	2
(Germany) Paderborn 2011	Round of 16	10th	4	3
(France) Mulhouse 2013	Round of 16	13th	4	3
(Egypt) Cairo 2015	Cancelled			
(France) Marseille 2017	Semi Final	3rd	5	1
(United States) Washington, D.C. 2019	Round of 16	11th	4	2
Hong Kong 2024	Quarter Final	6th	6	2
Total	17/26	0 Title	48	56

=== Asian Squash Team Championships ===
Year	Result	Position
(Pakistan) Karachi 1981	Did not present	
(Jordan) Amman 1984	Did not present	
(Malaysia) Kuala Lumpur 1986	Quarter-final	6th
Kuwait City 1988	Quarter-final	5th
(India) Kolkata 1990	Quarter-final	6th
(Pakistan) Peshawar 1992	Final	2nd
(Malaysia) Kuala Lumpur 1994	Semi Final	3rd
(Jordan) Amman 1996	Final	2nd
(Malaysia) Kuala Lumpur 1998	Semi Final	3rd
Hong Kong 2000	Semi Final	3rd
(Malaysia) Kuala Lumpur 2002	Semi Final	3rd
(Malaysia) Kuala Lumpur 2004	Quarter-final	5th
(Chinese Taipei) Taiwan 2006	Quarter-final	5th
Kuwait City 2008	Quarter-final	5th
(India) Chennai 2010	Quarter-final	5th
Kuwait City 2012	Quarter-final	5th
Hong Kong 2014	Quarter-final	5th
(Chinese Taipei) Taiwan 2016	Final	2nd
(South Korea) Cheongju 2018	Champions	1st
(Malaysia) Kuala Lumpur 2021	Semi Final	3rd
(South Korea) Cheongju 2022	Semi Final	3rd
Total	x1 - x3 - x6	

== See also ==
- Hong Kong Squash
- World Team Squash Championships
- Hong Kong women's national squash team
