= 2019 in squash sport =

This article lists the results for the sport of Squash in 2019.

== 2018–19 PSA World Tour ==
World Squash Championships

- February 23 – March 2: World Squash Championships in (United States) Chicago
  - Men: (Egypt) Ali Farag defeated (Egypt) Tarek Momen, 11–5, 11–13, 13–11, 11–3.
  - Women: (Egypt) Nour El Sherbini defeated (Egypt) Nour El Tayeb, 11–6, 11–5, 10–12, 15–13.

PSA World Tour Gold

- September 5 – 9, 2018: China Squash Open in Shanghai
  - Men: (Egypt) Mohamed Abouelghar defeated (New Zealand) Paul Coll, 11–8, 11–8, 11–8.
  - Women: (Egypt) Raneem El Weleily defeated (France) Camille Serme, 11–5, 8–11, 11–6, 11–5.
- September 27 – October 2, 2018: Netsuite Open in (United States) San Francisco
  - Men: (Egypt) Ali Farag defeated (Egypt) Mohamed El Shorbagy, 11–9, 13–11, 4–11, 11–9.
- October 16 – 21: Channel VAS Championships at St George's Hill in (England) Weybridge
  - Men: (Egypt) Tarek Momen defeated (Egypt) Ali Farag, 8–11, 11–8, 7–11, 11–5, 11–9.
- March 10 – 15: Canary Wharf Squash Classic in (England) London
  - Men: (New Zealand) Paul Coll defeated (Egypt) Tarek Momen, 11–8, 12–10, 11–3.
- March 11 – 15: Black Ball Squash Open in (Egypt) Cairo
  - Women: (Egypt) Raneem El Weleily defeated (Egypt) Nour El Sherbini, 9–11, 11–2, 6–11, 11–1, 11–5.
- March 26 – 31: Grasshopper Cup in (Switzerland) Zürich
  - Men: (Egypt) Mohamed El Shorbagy defeated (Egypt) Tarek Momen, 11–8, 13–11, 11–8.
- April 9 – 14: DPD Open in (Netherlands) Eindhoven
  - Men: (Egypt) Ali Farag defeated (Egypt) Mohamed El Shorbagy, 11–13, 11–6, 11–4, 11–4.
  - Women: (Egypt) Raneem El Weleily defeated (Egypt) Nour El Sherbini, 10–12, 9–11, 11–8, 11–8, 11–8.

PSA World Tour Silver

- September 27 – October 2, 2018: Netsuite Open in (United States) San Francisco
  - Women: (England) Sarah-Jane Perry defeated (Egypt) Raneem El Weleily, 11–9, 11–7, 9–11, 7–11, 11–7.
- January 8 – 12: CCI International in (India) Mumbai
  - Men: (Egypt) Tarek Momen defeated (Egypt) Fares Dessouky, 11–7, 7–11, 12–10, 10–12, 11–7.
- January 29 – February 2: Motor City Open in (United States) Detroit
  - Men: (Egypt) Mohamed Abouelghar defeated (Peru) Diego Elías, 5–11, 11–6, 11–3, 4–11, 11–8.
- March 3 – 7: Troilus Canada Cup in Toronto
  - Men: (Peru) Diego Elías defeated (New Zealand) Paul Coll, 11–8, 6–11, 11–8, 8–11, 11–7.

PSA World Tour Bronze

- October 17 – 22, 2018: Carol Weymuller Open in (United States) Brooklyn Heights
  - Women: (Egypt) Nour El Tayeb defeated (England) Sarah-Jane Perry, 11–8, 10–12, 11–6, 11–8.
- November 10 – 14, 2018: QSF No.1 in (Qatar) Doha
  - Men: (England) Daryl Selby defeated (Egypt) Omar Mosaad, 11–9, 11–6, 11–6.
- November 28 – December 2, 2018: Pakistan Open Squash Championships in Karachi
  - Men: (Egypt) Karim Abdel Gawad defeated (Peru) Diego Elías, 11–4, 11–2, 11–8.
- January 30 – February 4: Cleveland Classic in (United States) Cleveland
  - Women: (Egypt) Nour El Tayeb defeated (Wales) Tesni Evans, 11–5, 11–7, 9–11, 11–9.
- February 6 – 10: Pittsburgh Open in (United States) Pittsburgh
  - Men: (France) Grégoire Marche defeated (Egypt) Zahed Salem, 11–9, 11–6, 10–12, 6–11, 11–5.
- March 26 – 31: Texas Open in (United States) Dallas
  - Women: (United States) Amanda Sobhy defeated (England) Victoria Lust, 11–4, 11–2, 11–5.
- April 10 – 14: Macau Open in Macau
  - Men: (Peru) Diego Elías defeated (Egypt) Omar Mosaad, 11–3, 11–4, 11–9.
  - Women: (Hong Kong) Annie Au defeated (Malaysia) Low Wee Wern, 11–5, 13–11, 11–8.

PSA World Tour Platinum

- October 6 – 13, 2018: United States Open in Philadelphia
  - Men: (Egypt) Mohamed El Shorbagy defeated (Germany) Simon Rösner, 8–11, 11–8, 6–11, 11–8, 11–4.
  - Women: (Egypt) Raneem El Weleily defeated (Egypt) Nour El Sherbini, 11–6, 11–9, 11–8.
- October 27 – November 2, 2018: Qatar Classic in Doha
  - Men: (Egypt) Ali Farag defeated (Germany) Simon Rösner, 11–9, 11–7, 11–5.
- November 19 – 25: Hong Kong Open in Hong Kong
  - Men: (Egypt) Mohamed El Shorbagy defeated (Egypt) Ali Farag, 11–6, 11–7, 11–7.
  - Women: (New Zealand) Joelle King defeated (Egypt) Raneem El Weleily, 11–4, 12–10, 19–17.
- December 3 – 9, 2018: Black Ball Squash Open in (Egypt) Cairo
  - Men: (Egypt) Karim Abdel Gawad defeated (Egypt) Ali Farag, 11–6, 13–11, 7–11, 11–8.
- January 16 – 24: Tournament of Champions in (United States) New York City
  - Men: (Egypt) Ali Farag defeated Mohamed El Shorbagy, 10–12, 6–11, 11–6, 11–3, 11–8.
  - Women: (Egypt) Nour El Sherbini defeated (Egypt) Raneem El Weleily, 11–9, 11–8, 11–8.

World and Continental Championships

- January 16 – 20: Asian Junior Teams Championships in (Thailand) Pattaya
  - Men's: Pakistan (Abbas Zeb, Haris Qasim, Muhammad Farhan Hashmi) defeated India (Utkarsh Baheti, Yash Fadte, Veer Chotrani), 2–0.
  - Women's: Malaysia (Aifa Azman, Chan Yiwen, Ooi Kah Yan) defeated Hong Kong (Chan Sin-yuk, Cheng Nga-ching, Cheng Nga Ching), 2–0.
- April 3 – 6: European Squash Team Championships (Division 3) in (Portugal) Lisbon
  - Men's: Poland (Adam Pełczyński, Adrian Marszał, Piotr Hemmerling, Jakub Pytlowany) defeated Austria (Jakob Dirnberger, Marcus Greslehner, Lukas Windischberger, Paul Mairinger), after points.
  - Women's: Russia (Ekaterina Marusan, Alesya Aleshina, Varvara Esina) defeated Austria (Birgit Coufal, Jacqueline Peychär, Sandra Polak), 2–1.
- April 13 – 21: U19 Individuals and Team Championships in (Czech Republic) Prague
- May 1 – 4: European Squash Team Championships (Divisions 1 & 2) in (England) Birmingham
- May 1 – 5: 2019 Men's Asian Individual Squash Championships in (Malaysia) Kuala Lumpur
- May 9 – 12: U15 & U17 Individuals and Team Championships in (Netherlands) Eindhoven
- June 26 – 30: Asian Junior Squash Individual Championships in Macau
- August 21 – 24: European Masters Individual Championships in (Austria) Vienna
- September 6 – 10: 2019 Men's European Individual Closed Championships in (Romania) Bucharest
- September 19 – 22: European Club Championships in (Scotland) Edinburgh
