= Hong Kong national squash team =

Hong Kong national squash team may refer to:

- Hong Kong men's national squash team
- Hong Kong women's national squash team
