= Argentina Squash Rackets Association =

Sports governing body in Argentina

Asociación Argentina de Squash Rackets
- Sport: Squash
- Regional affiliation: Federation of Panamerica
- Location: Argentina
- President: Sr. Juan Pablo García
- Secretary: Sr. Horacio Resta
- Coach: Andrés Nieto

Official website
- aasr.org.ar
- (Argentina)

Argentina Squash Rackets Association ("Asociación Argentina de Squash Rackets" in Spanish), is the governing body of squash federations and clubs in Argentina.

== See also ==
- Argentina men's national squash team
