= 2011 Men's World Team Squash Championships =

Men's World Team 2011
- 23rd WSF World Men's Team Championship
- Location: Paderborn, Germany
- Date: August 21–27, 2011
- Teams: 32 (from all the 5 confederations)
- Website www.wmtc2011.com

Results
- Champions: Egypt
- Runners-up: England
- Third place: Australia

The 2011 Men's World Team Squash Championships is the men's edition of the 2011 World Team Squash Championships organized by the World Squash Federation, which serves as the world team championship for squash players. The event were held in Paderborn, Germany and took place from August 21 to August 27, 2011. The tournament was organized by the World Squash Federation and the German Squash Association. The Egypt team won his third World Team Championships beating the English team in the final.

== Participating teams ==
A total of 32 teams competed from all the five confederations: Africa, America, Asia, Europe and Oceania. For Colombia, Namibia and Ukraine, it was their first participation at a world team championship.

Africa (SFA)	America (FPS)	Asia (ASF)	Europe (ESF)	Oceania (OSF)	Map
Egypt (Title Holder); Namibia; South Africa	Argentina; Bermuda; Canada; Colombia; Mexico; United States	Hong Kong; India; Kuwait; Malaysia; Pakistan; South Korea	Austria; Denmark; England; France; Finland; Germany (Host Country); Hungary; Ireland; Italy; Netherlands; Scotland; Spain; Switzerland; Sweden; Ukraine	Australia; New Zealand	Map of the participating nations

== Seeds ==
1. England (final)
2. Egypt (champion)
3. France (semifinals)
4. Australia (semifinals)
5. Malaysia (quarterfinals)
6. India (quarterfinals)
7. Canada (round of 16)
8. United States (quarterfinals)
9. Italy (quarterfinals, then disqualified)
10. Mexico (round of 16)
11. South Africa (round of 16)
12. Pakistan (first round)
13. Finland (round of 16)
14. Netherlands (round of 16)
15. New Zealand (first round)
16. Germany (round of 16)

== Squads ==
England

- Nick Matthew
- James Willstrop
- Peter Barker
- Daryl Selby

Germany

- Simon Rösner
- Jens Schoor
- Raphael Kandra
- Andre Haschker

Spain

- Borja Golán
- Alejandro Garbi
- Ivan Flores
- David Vidal

(Republic of Ireland) Ireland

- Arthur Gaskin
- Derek Ryan
- Steve Richardson
- Conor O'Hare

Egypt

- Ramy Ashour
- Karim Darwish
- Mohamed El Shorbagy
- Hisham Ashour

New Zealand

- Martin Knight
- Campbell Grayson
- Evan Williams
- Paul Coll

Hong Kong

- Max Lee
- Dick Lau
- Leo Au
- Tsz Fung Yip

Sweden

- Christian Drakenberg
- Sebastian Viktor
- Joakim Larsson
- Alex Christenson

France

- Grégory Gaultier
- Thierry Lincou
- Mathieu Castagnet
- Grégoire Marche

Netherlands

- Laurens Jan Anjema
- Dylan Bennett
- Piëdro Schweertman
- Bart Ravelli

Argentina

- Gonzalo Miranda
- Hernán D'Arcangelo
- Roberto Pezzota
- Juan Pablo Roude

South Korea

- Nyeon Ho Lee
- Seung Taek Lee
- Seung Joon Lee
- Se Hyun Lee

Australia

- David Palmer
- Cameron Pilley
- Stewart Boswell
- Aaron Frankcomb

Finland

- Olli Tuominen
- Henrik Mustonen
- Matias Tuomi
- Arttu Moisio

Colombia

- Andrés Vargas
- Javier Castilla
- Juan Camilo Vargas
- Jairo Navarro

Bermuda

- Micah Franklin
- Robbie Maycock
- Chris Stout
- not held

Malaysia

- Mohd Azlan Iskandar
- Ong Beng Hee
- Mohd Nafiizwan Adnan
- Kamran Khan

Pakistan

- Aamir Atlas Khan
- Yasir Butt
- Nasir Iqbal
- Waqar Mehboob

Denmark

- Kristian Frost Olesen
- Rasmus Nielsen
- Morten Sorensen
- Michael Frilund

Austria

- Aqeel Rehman
- Leopold Czaska
- Jakob Dirnberger
- Andreas Freudensprung

India

- Saurav Ghosal
- Siddarth Suchde
- Harinder Pal Sandhu
- Mahesh Mangaonkar

South Africa

- Steve Coppinger
- Shaun Le Roux
- Clinton Leeuw
- Rodney Durbach

Kuwait

- Abdullah Al Muzayen
- Ammar Altamimi
- Ali Bader Al-Ramzi
- Yousif Nizar Saleh

Hungary

- Márk Krajcsák
- Marton Szaboky
- Sandor Fulop
- Peter Hoffman

Canada

- Shahier Razik
- Shawn Delierre
- Andrew McDougall
- Andrew Schnell

Mexico

- Arturo Salazar
- Eric Gálvez
- César Salazar
- not held

Scotland

- Alan Clyne
- Stuart Crawford
- Chris Small
- Harry Leitch

Namibia

- Marco Becker
- Norbert Dorgeloh
- Andrew Forrest
- Angelo Titus

United States

- Julian Illingworth
- Gilly Lane
- Chris Gordon
- Todd Harrity

Italy

- Stéphane Galifi
- Davide Bianchetti
- Marcus Berrett
- Amr Swelim

Switzerland

- Nicolas Müller
- Reiko Peter
- John Williams
- Lukas Burkhart

Ukraine

- Ruslan Sorochynsky
- Kostyantyn Rybalchenko
- Valerii Fedoruk
- Denys Podvornyi

== Group stage results ==
=== Pool A ===
England	3	-	0	Spain
Germany	2	–	1	(Republic of Ireland) Ireland

England	3	-	0	Germany
(Republic of Ireland) Ireland	1	–	2	Spain

England	3	-	0	(Republic of Ireland) Ireland
Germany	3	–	0	Spain

Rank	Nation	Match	Won	Lost	Points
1	England	3	3	0	6
2	Germany	3	2	1	4
3	Spain	3	1	2	2
4	(Republic of Ireland) Ireland	3	0	2	0

=== Pool B ===
Egypt	3	-	0	Sweden
New Zealand	0	–	3	Hong Kong

Egypt	3	-	0	Hong Kong
New Zealand	3	–	0	Sweden

Egypt	3	-	0	New Zealand
Hong Kong	3	–	0	Sweden

Rank	Nation	Match	Won	Lost	Points
1	Egypt	3	3	0	6
2	Hong Kong	3	2	1	4
3	New Zealand	3	1	2	2
4	Sweden	3	0	2	0

=== Pool C ===
France	3	-	0	Argentina
Netherlands	3	–	0	South Korea

France	3	-	0	Netherlands
Argentina	3	–	0	South Korea

France	3	-	0	South Korea
Netherlands	2	–	1	Argentina

Rank	Nation	Match	Won	Lost	Points
1	France	3	3	0	6
2	Netherlands	3	2	1	4
3	Argentina	3	1	2	2
4	South Korea	3	0	3	0

=== Pool D ===
Australia	3	-	0	Bermuda
Finland	3	–	0	Colombia

Australia	3	-	0	Colombia
Finland	3	–	0	Bermuda

Australia	2	-	1	Finland
Colombia	3	–	0	Bermuda

Rank	Nation	Match	Won	Lost	Points
1	Australia	3	3	0	6
2	Finland	3	2	1	4
3	Colombia	3	1	2	2
4	Bermuda	3	0	3	0

=== Pool E ===
Malaysia	3	-	0	Denmark
Pakistan	3	–	0	Austria

Malaysia	3	-	0	Pakistan
Denmark	2	–	1	Austria

Malaysia	3	-	0	Austria
Pakistan	1	–	2	Denmark

Rank	Nation	Match	Won	Lost	Points
1	Malaysia	3	3	0	6
2	Denmark	3	2	1	4
3	Pakistan	3	1	2	2
4	Austria	3	0	3	0

=== Pool F ===
India	3	-	0	Hungary
South Africa	3	–	0	Kuwait

India	3	-	0	Kuwait
South Africa	3	–	0	Hungary

India	3	-	0	South Africa
Kuwait	3	–	0	Hungary

Rank	Nation	Match	Won	Lost	Points
1	India	3	3	0	6
2	South Africa	3	2	1	4
3	Kuwait	3	1	2	2
4	Hungary	3	0	3	0

=== Pool G ===
Canada	2	-	1	Scotland
Mexico	3	–	0	Namibia

Canada	2	-	1	Mexico
Scotland	3	–	0	Namibia

Canada	3	-	0	Namibia
Mexico	2	–	1	Scotland

Rank	Nation	Match	Won	Lost	Points
1	Canada	3	3	0	6
2	Mexico	3	2	1	4
3	Scotland	3	1	2	2
4	Namibia	3	0	3	0

=== Pool H ===
United States	3	-	0	Ukraine
Italy	2	–	1	Switzerland

United States	2	-	1	Switzerland
Italy	3	–	0	Ukraine

United States	0	-	3	Italy
Switzerland	3	–	0	Ukraine

Rank	Nation	Match	Won	Lost	Points
1	Italy	3	3	0	6
2	United States	3	2	1	4
3	Switzerland	3	1	2	2
4	Ukraine	3	0	3	0

== Finals ==
=== Draw ===
Round of 16
1	England	3	3	2
Hong Kong	0	0	0
10	Mexico	0	3	2
9	Italy	3	0	3
4	Australia	3	1	3
14	Netherlands	0	3	0
Denmark	0	1
6	India	3	3
5	Malaysia	3	3	2
11	South Africa	0	2	1
13	Finland	0	0	1
3	France	3	3	2
8	United States	3	3
7	Canada	1	2
16	Germany	1	2	0
2	Egypt	3	3	2

Quarterfinals
1	England	3	3	1
9	Italy	0	0	2
4	Australia	3	3
6	India	1	0
5	Malaysia	0	0	0
3	France	3	3	2
8	United States	0	0	1
2	Egypt	3	3	2

Semifinals
1	England	3	3	2
4	Australia	0	0	0
3	France	3	0	2
2	Egypt	2	3	3

Final
1	England	0	3	1
2	Egypt	3	0	3

Third place match
4	Australia	0	3	3
3	France	3	1	1

=== Results ===
==== Quarter-finals ====
England
2
QUARTER FINAL
Paderborn, Germany
25 August 2011
Glass Court

Italy
1

			1	2	3	4	5
1	(England) (Italy)	N°1 Nick Matthew; N°1 Stéphane Galifi	11; 8	11; 8	11; 5
2	(England) (Italy)	N°2 James Willstrop; N°2 Davide Bianchetti	11; 7	11; 4	11; 4
3	(England) (Italy)	N°3 Daryl Selby; N°3 Amr Swelim	10; 11	11; 3	10; 12

Australia
2
QUARTER FINAL
Paderborn, Germany
25 August 2011
Court N°1

India
0

			1	2	3	4	5
1	(Australia) (India)	N°1 David Palmer; N°1 Saurav Ghosal	7; 11	11; 8	11; 4	11; 6
2	(Australia) (India)	N°2 Cameron Pilley; N°2 Siddarth Suchde	11; 9	11; 8	11; 4
3	(Australia) (India)	N°3 Stewart Boswell; N°3 Harinder Pal Sandhu

Malaysia
0
QUARTER FINAL
Paderborn, Germany
25 August 2011
Court N°1

France
3

			1	2	3	4	5
1	(Malaysia) (France)	N°1 Mohd Azlan Iskandar; N°1 Grégory Gaultier	4; 11	6; 11	4; 11
2	(Malaysia) (France)	N°2 Ong Beng Hee; N°2 Thierry Lincou	10; 11	2; 11	7; 11
3	(Malaysia) (France)	N°3 Mohd Nafiizwan Adnan; N°3 Mathieu Castagnet	8; 11	2; 11

United States
0
QUARTER FINAL
Paderborn, Germany
25 August 2011
Glass Court

Egypt
3

			1	2	3	4	5
1	(United States) (Egypt)	N°1 Julian Illingworth; N°1 Karim Darwish	4; 11	4; 11	2; 11
2	(United States) (Egypt)	N°2 Chris Gordon; N°2 Mohamed El Shorbagy	9; 11	8; 11	4; 11
3	(United States) (Egypt)	N°3 Todd Harrity; N°3 Hisham Mohd Ashour	8; 11	1; 11	7; 11

==== Semi-finals ====
England
3
SEMI FINAL
Paderborn, Germany
26 August 2011
Glass Court

Australia
0

			1	2	3	4	5
1	(England) (Australia)	N°2 James Willstrop; N°2 Cameron Pilley	11; 7	11; 8	11; 2
2	(England) (Australia)	N°1 Nick Matthew; N°1 David Palmer	11; 5	11; 8	11; 5
3	(England) (Australia)	N°3 Peter Barker; N°3 Stewart Boswell	12; 10	11; 7

France
1
SEMI FINAL
Paderborn, Germany
26 August 2011
Glass Court

Egypt
2

			1	2	3	4	5
1	(France) (Egypt)	N°2 Thierry Lincou; N°2 Karim Darwish	11; 7	3; 11	12; 10	4; 11	11; 6
2	(France) (Egypt)	N°1 Grégory Gaultier; N°1 Ramy Ashour	6; 11	6; 11	6; 11
3	(France) (Egypt)	N°3 Mathieu Castagnet; N°3 Mohamed El Shorbagy	12; 14	11; 9	11; 9	7; 11	6; 11

==== Final ====
England
1
FINAL
Paderborn, Germany
27 August 2011
Glass Court

Egypt
2

			1	2	3	4	5
1	(England) (Egypt)	N°1 Nick Matthew; N°1 Ramy Ashour	7; 11	9; 11	12; 12
2	(England) (Egypt)	N°3 Peter Barker; N°3 Hisham Mohd Ashour	11; 6	11; 9	11; 7
3	(England) (Egypt)	N°2 James Willstrop; N°2 Karim Darwish	5; 11	11; 13	11; 9	4; 11

2011 WSF World Team Championship

Egypt
3rd title

Team
Ramy Ashour – Karim Darwish – Mohamed El Shorbagy – Hisham Mohd Ashour

== Post-tournament team ranking ==
Position	Team	Result
1st	Egypt	Champions
2nd	England	Final
3rd	Australia	Semi-final
4th	France	Semi-final
5th	Malaysia	Quarter-final
6th	United States	Quarter-final
7th	India	Quarter-final
8th	Germany	Round of 16

Position	Team	Result
9th	Netherlands	Round of 16
10th	Hong Kong	Round of 16
11th	Finland	Round of 16
12th	Denmark	Round of 16
13th	South Africa	Round of 16
14th	Canada	Round of 16
15th	Mexico	Round of 16
16th	Switzerland	Group Stage

Position	Team	Result
17th	Spain	Group Stage
18th	Kuwait	Group Stage
19th	(Republic of Ireland) Ireland	Group Stage
20th	Scotland	Group Stage
21st	Pakistan	Group Stage
22nd	New Zealand	Group Stage
23rd	Argentina	Group Stage
24th	Austria	Group Stage

Position	Team	Result
25th	Colombia	Group Stage
26th	Hungary	Group Stage
27th	South Korea	Group Stage
28th	Sweden	Group Stage
29th	Ukraine	Group Stage
30th	Namibia	Group Stage
31st	Bermuda	Group Stage
DSQ	Italy	Quarter-final

== See also ==
- World Team Squash Championships
- World Squash Federation
- 2011 Men's World Open Squash Championship

Preceded by Denmark (Odense); 2009	Squash World Team; Germany (Paderborn); 2011	Succeeded by France (Mulhouse); 2013
