= Colombian Squash Federation =

Sports governing body in Colombia

FedeSquash Colombia
- Sport: Squash
- Regional affiliation: Federation of Panamerica
- Location: Bogotá
- President: Pablo Felipe Serna
- Secretary: Sergio Becerra

Official website
- www.squashcolombia.org.co
- (Colombia)

Colombian Squash Federation (Spanish: FedeSquash Colombia) is the National Organisation for Squash in Colombia.

The Federation is affiliated with the World Squash Federation.

== See also ==
- Colombia men's national squash team
