= Egyptian Squash Association =

National egyptian squash federation

Egyptian Squash Federation
- Sport: Squash
- Founded: 1991
- Regional affiliation: Squash Federation of Africa
- Location: Nasr City, Cairo
- President: Assem Khalifa
- Chairman: Sayed El Kamash
- Secretary: Dalia Mahmoud Al Hefney; Mona Fawzey
- Coach: Amir Wagih

Official website
- www.squashegypt.com
- (Egypt)

The Egyptian Squash Federation is recognised as the Egyptian national governing body for the sport of squash.

The federation is responsible for the following tasks:

- Decide public policies that lead to the deployment and promotion of squash in the Arab Republic of Egypt .
- Administration of squash from the technical, financial and regulatory aspects and organizing and implementing different competitions and championships.
- Development of the rules governing the affairs of the training and arbitration as well as terms and conditions that must be met by the coaches and referees.
- Preservation of the rules and principles of the international game of squash and protect the hobby.
- The preparation of national teams that represent Egypt in all international forums.
- Approval and registration of players enrolled in Egyptian Squash Federation.
- Sets rules and regulations governing the transfers of players.
- Support the Egyptian representation in international federations, continental and regional presence to ensure Egyptian work on the development of resources.

== See also ==
- Squash in Egypt
- Egypt men's national squash team
- Egypt women's national squash team
- Egypt men's national junior squash team
- Egypt women's national junior squash team
