= Nicolas Van Caesbroeck =

Belgian chef and squash player

Nicolas Van Caesbroeck (13 January 1981 – 9 December 2011) was a Belgian chef and former squash champion.

In 2010, Van Caesbroeck became head chef of Restaurant Invincible in Antwerp. He and his kitchen team earned a Bib Gourmand and a GaultMillau award for the best brasserie-kitchen in 2012. GaultMillau regarded him as a very promising young chef.

== Squash ==
Before choosing a career in the kitchen, Van Caesbroeck played squash at a high level. He won his first national title at level -10, a feat he repeated in the periods 1991–1995 and 1997–1999. In 1999 he represented Belgium in the 1999 Men's World Team Squash Championships and in 2002 he took part in the European Squash Team Championships.

== Personal ==
Van Caesbroeck was married to Carolien and father of his son, Louis.
