= Squash South Africa =

Sports governing body in South Africa

- Sport: Squash
- Founded: 1910
- Regional affiliation: Squash Federation of Africa
- Location: Johannesburg, Gauteng
- President: Steve Doeg
- Coach: Richard Castle

Official website
- www.squashsa.co.za
- (South Africa)

Squash South Africa is recognised as the South African national governing body of the sport of squash by SASCOC.

== See also ==
- South Africa men's national squash team
- South Africa women's national squash team
