= Nigeria Squash Federation =

Governing body of Nigerian squash

- Sport: Squash
- Abbreviation: NSF
- Founded: 1974
- Affiliation: World Squash Federation
- Regional affiliation: Squash Federation of Africa
- Headquarters: Abuja, Nigeria
- Location: National Stadium, Abuja
- President: Boye Oyerinde
- Chairman: Boye Oyerinde

Official website
- nigeriasquashfed.com
- (Nigeria)

The Nigeria Squash Federation was established in 1974 as the governing body that oversees the sport of squash in Nigeria.
