= Namibian Squash Association =

Governing body of squash in Namibia

- Sport: Squash
- Abbreviation: NSA
- Regional affiliation: Squash Federation of Africa
- Location: Windhoek
- President: Tiego Rabasha
- Chairperson: Adri Lambert

Official website
- www.namsquash.org
- (Namibia)

The Namibian Squash Association, or NSA, as it is known locally, is the governing body of squash in Namibia. The NSA is responsible for overseeing the development of the sport through junior development and ensuring the expansion of an active adult sports base. The NSA is affiliated with all necessary Namibian sports bodies in force to make the sport more popular and to remain part of an active Namibian sports landscape.
