= Kuwait Squash Federation =

- Sport: Squash
- Regional affiliation: Asian Squash Federation
- Location: Hawalli
- President: Hussain A. Al Maqsseed
- Secretary: Fayez A. Al – Mutairi

Official website
- www.squashkuwait.com
- (Kuwait)

Kuwait Squash Federation is the National Organisation for Squash in Kuwait.

== See also ==
- Kuwait men's national squash team
