= Czech Squash Association =

Sports governing body in the Czech Republic

- Sport: Squash
- Abbreviation: ČAS
- Founded: 1992
- Regional affiliation: European Squash Federation
- Location: Prague
- President: Tomas Cvikl
- Secretary: Tomas Forter

Official website
- www.czechsquash.cz
- (Czech Republic)

The Czech Squash Association (Czech: Česká asociace squashe) is the national organisation for squash in the Czech Republic.

== See also ==
- Czech Republic men's national squash team
