= Japan national squash team =

Japan national squash team may refer to:

- Japan men's national squash team
- Japan women's national squash team
