= Brazilian Squash Confederation =

Governing body for squash in Brazil

Confederação Brasileira de Squash
- Sport: Squash
- Founded: 1985
- Regional affiliation: Federation of Panamerica
- Location: Brasília
- President: Nelson Pires Ribeiro Neto

Official website
- www.squashbrasil.org
- (Brazil)

Brazilian Squash Confederation (Portuguese: Confederação Brasileira de Squash) is the governing body of squash federations and clubs in Brazil.
