= Botswana Squash Rackets Association =

Sports governing body in Botswana

- Sport: Squash
- Abbreviation: BSRA
- Regional affiliation: Squash Federation of Africa
- Location: Gaborone
- President: Tiego Rabasha
- Chairperson: Pule Tangane

Official website
- www.botswanasquash.co.bw
- (Botswana)

Botswana Squash Rackets Association is the national governing body for squash in Botswana.

== See also ==
- Botswana men's national squash team
