= Mexico Squash Federation =

Sports governing body in Mexico

Federación de Squash de México
- Sport: Squash
- Regional affiliation: Federation of Panamerica
- Location: Mexico
- President: Federico Serna Altamirano
- Coach: Rehman Gul
- (Mexico)

Mexico Squash Federation ("Federación de Squash de México" in Spanish), is the governing body of squash federations and clubs in Mexico.

== See also ==
- Mexico men's national squash team
