= Korea Squash Federation =

National squash organisation

- Sport: Squash
- Abbreviation: KSF
- Founded: 1989
- Regional affiliation: Asian Squash Federation
- Location: Bangi-dong, Songpa-gu, Seoul
- President: Kim Won-Kwan

Official website
- www.koreasquash.or.kr
- (South Korea)

Korea Squash Federation is the national organisation for Squash in Republic of Korea.

KSF was founded in May 1989, as the name of Korea Squashball Association, and changed its name as the current in November 1992. In January 1993, the organization joined World Squash Federation as a member country, and also joined Asian Squash Federation on June in the same year. KSF, which was officially recognized as the affiliated sports organization of Korea Sports Council, now has 17 local and 5 international branches, and also leads Korea University Squash Federation.
