= South Africa women's national squash team =

South Africa
- Coach: Richard Castle
- Association: Squash South Africa
- Colors: Green and Gold

World Team Championships
- First year: 1992
- Titles: 0
- Runners-up: 0
- Best finish: 3rd
- Entries: 12

The South Africa women's national squash team represents South Africa in international squash team competitions, and is governed by Squash South Africa.

Since 1992, South Africa has participated in two Semi finals of the World Squash Team Open.

== Current team ==
- Alexandra Fuller
- Hayley Ward
- Lizelle Muller
- Cheyna Wood

== Results ==
=== World Team Squash Championships ===
Year	Result	Position	W	L
(England) Birmingham 1979	Did not present			
(Canada) Toronto 1981	Did not present			
(Australia) Perth 1983	Did not present			
(Republic of Ireland) Dublin 1985	Did not present			
(New Zealand) Auckland 1987	Did not present			
(Netherlands) Warmond 1989	Did not present			
(Australia) Sydney 1990	Did not present			
(Canada) Vancouver 1992	Quarter Final	5th	6	1
(England) Guernsey 1994	Semi Final	3rd	3	2
(Malaysia) Petaling Jaya 1996	Semi Final	3rd	4	6
(Germany) Stuttgart 1998	Semi Final	4th	3	3
(England) Sheffield 2000	Quarter Final	5th	6	1
(Denmark) Odense 2002	Quarter Final	8th	3	4
(Netherlands) Amsterdam 2004	Group Stage	10th	3	3
(Canada) Edmonton 2006	Quarter Final	6th	3	3
(Egypt) Cairo 2008	Group Stage	10th	3	3
(New Zealand) Palmerston North 2010	Group Stage	10th	3	3
(France) Nîmes 2012	Round of 16	6th	4	3
(Canada) Niagara-on-the-Lake 2014	Group Stage	12th	3	4
(France) Issy-les-Moulineaux 2016	Did not present			
Total	12/20	0 Title	44	36

== See also ==
- Squash South Africa
- World Team Squash Championships
- South Africa men's national squash team
