= Omar El Borolossy =

Egyptian squash player (born 1975)

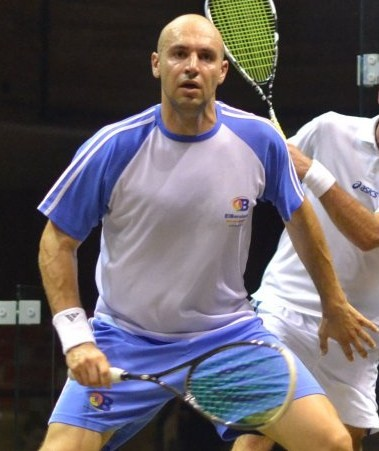

Personal information
- Born: October 11, 1975 (age 50) Giza, Egypt
- Height: 1.88 m (6 ft 2 in)
- Weight: 88 kg (194 lb)

Sport
- Country: Egypt
- Turned pro: 1993
- Coached by: Ashraf Hanafy
- Retired: 2008
- Racquet used: Harrow

Men's singles
- Highest ranking: No. 14 (June, 2001)
- Title: 8
- Tour final: 13

Omar El Borolossy (born October 11, 1975 in Giza), also known as Omar Elborolossy, is a former professional squash player who represented Egypt. He reached a career-high world ranking of World No. 14 in June 2001. He represented Egypt at the 1993 Men's World Team Squash Championships, 1995 Men's World Team Squash Championships, and 1997 Men's World Team Squash Championships before helping Egypt win the title for the first time at the 1999 Men's World Team Squash Championships. He is married to squash player Salma Shabana, former female world No. 20.
