= David Letourneau =

Canadian squash player (born 1989)

Personal information
- Born: April 18, 1989 (age 37) Calgary, Alberta, Canada
- Height: 1.90 m (6 ft 3 in)
- Weight: 81 kg (179 lb)

Sport
- Country: Canada
- Turned pro: 2011
- Coached by: Arthur Hough
- Retired: Active
- Racquet used: Dunlop

Men's singles
- Highest ranking: No. 103 (May 2013)
- Current ranking: No. 240 (April 30, 2015)
- Updated on April 30, 2015

David Letourneau (born April 18, 1989) is a professional squash player who represents Canada. He reached a career-high world ranking of No. 103 in May 2013.
