= Dane Sharp (squash player) =

Canadian squash player (born 1985)

Personal information
- Born: January 1, 1985 (age 41) Toronto, Ontario, Canada
- Height: 1.82 m (6 ft 0 in)

Sport
- Country: Canada
- Turned pro: 2008
- Coached by: Mike Way
- Retired: Active
- Racquet used: Dunlop

Men's singles
- Highest ranking: No. 69 (April 2014)
- Current ranking: N/A (Ret.) (January 2015)
- Title: 2
- Tour final: 2
- Updated on January 2015

Dane Sharp (born January 1, 1985, in Toronto, Ontario) is a professional squash player who represents Canada. He reached a career-high world ranking of World No. 79 in April 2014. Dane currently works as a squash pro at Merion Cricket Club.
