= Lukas Burkhart =

Swiss squash player (born 1991)

Personal information
- Born: 27 April 1991 (age 35) Luzern, Switzerland
- Height: 1.78 m (5 ft 10 in)
- Weight: 74 kg (163 lb)

Sport
- Country: Switzerland
- Turned pro: 2009
- Retired: Active
- Racquet used: Tecnifibre

Men's singles
- Highest ranking: No. 167 (June 2013)
- Current ranking: No. 167 (June 2013)
- Updated on June 2013

Lukas Burkhart (born 27 April 1991 in Luzern) is a professional squash player who represents Switzerland. He reached a career-high world ranking of World No. 167 in June 2013.
