= Squash Association of Hong Kong, China =

National Organisation for Squash in Hong Kong

- Sport: Squash
- Abbreviation: SAHKC
- Founded: 1961
- Affiliation: World Squash
- Regional affiliation: Asian Squash Federation
- Location: Hong Kong
- President: David Mui
- Chairman: Duncan Chiu

Official website
- www.hksquash.org.hk
- (Hong Kong)

Squash Association of Hong Kong, China, founded in 1961, is a member of the World Squash and Asian Squash Federation. Officially recognized by the Sports Federation & Olympic Committee of Hong Kong, China as the sole governing body for squash in Hong Kong. The Association has the authority to select and field Hong Kong representative teams in international squash competitions. The mission of the association is to ensure that squash remains a strong, viable and growing Hong Kong sport and that Hong Kong aspires to be the leaders of squash in Asia

== Objectives ==
- To develop the game of squash in Hong Kong.
- To safeguard the game of squash and to maintain the rules and regulations of HK Squash in Hong Kong.
- To represent Hong Kong's official membership of the World Squash, Asian Squash Federation and Sports Federation & Olympic Committee of Hong Kong, China.
- To arrange, regulate and manage international and local matches, championships and competitions.
- Generally to do all such other acts and things as are incidental or conducive to the attainment of all or any of the above objects.
