= List of Red Warszawa band members =

This is a list of past and present Red Warszawa band members.

(1986)	"Lækre" Jens Mondrup - Vocals; "Heavy" Henning Nymand - Guitar
(1987)	"Lækre" Jens Mondrup - Vocals; "Heavy" Henning Nymand - Guitar; Stefan Kjergaard - Guitar; "Panik" Troels Christensen - Bass: Robert Smidt - Drums; Mads Flanding - Horns
(1988)	"Lækre" Jens Mondrup - Vocals; "Heavy" Henning Nymand - Guitar; Stefan Kjergaard - Guitar; "Panik" Troels Christensen - Bass; Michael Nielsen - Drums
(1989)	Jacob Sundmand - Vocals; "Heavy" Henning Nymand - Guitar; Stefan Kjergaard - Guitar; "Panik" Troels Christensen - Bass; Michael Nielsen - Drums
(1990)	"Lækre" Jens Mondrup - Vocals; "Heavy" Henning Nymand - Guitar; Stefan Kjergaard - Guitar; Damien Gregory - Keyboards; Martin Thordrup - Bass; Anders Schlandbuch - Drums
(1991-1993)	"Lækre" Jens Mondrup - Vocals; "Heavy" Henning Nymand - Guitar; Martin Thordrup - Bass
(1994)	Erik Gert Olsen - Vocals; "Heavy" Henning Nymand - Guitar; Joachim Bøggild - Bass; Lev Averboukh - Drums
(1995-1996)	"Lækre" Jens Mondrup - Vocals; "Heavy" Henning Nymand - Guitar; "Tonser" Henrik Holstrøm - Bass; Jan Wiegandt - Drums
(1996-1998)	"Lækre" Jens Mondrup - Vocals; "Heavy" Henning Nymand - Guitar; "Tonser" Henrik Holstrøm - Bass; Lars Gerrild - Drums
(1999-2000)	"Lækre" Jens Mondrup - Vocals; "Heavy" Henning Nymand - Guitar; "Tonser" Henrik Holstrøm - Bass; "Dumme" Daniel Preisler Larsen - Drums
(2000-2002)	"Lækre" Jens Mondrup - Vocals; "Heavy" Henning Nymand - Guitar; "Tonser" Henrik Holstrøm - Bass; Morten "Måtten Møbelbanker" Nielsen - Drums
(2002-2003)	"Lækre" Jens Mondrup - Vocals; "Heavy" Henning Nymand - Guitar; Lars "Majbritt" Mayland - Bass; Morten "Måtten Møbelbanker" Nielsen - Drums
(2003-2006)	"Lækre" Jens Mondrup - Vocals; "Heavy" Henning Nymand - Guitar; Thomas "Tove Tusindpik" Christensen - Bass; Morten "Måtten Møbelbanker" Nielsen - Drums
(2006–present)	"Lækre" Jens Mondrup - Vocals; "Heavy" Henning Nymand - Guitar; Matthias "MyTightAss" Pedersen - Bass; Morten "Måtten Møbelbanker" Nielsen - Drums
