= Qatar Squash Federation =

- Sport: Squash
- Founded: 1984
- Regional affiliation: Asian Squash Federation
- Location: Doha
- President: Nasser al-Khelaïfi
- Secretary: Hisham Ebrahim Algosaibi

Official website
- web.archive.org/web/20120622100927/http://www.qatarsquash.com/
- (Qatar)

Qatar Squash Federation is the national organisation for squash in Qatar.

== History ==
Initially, the Qatar Squash Federation was a part of a joint organisation formed in 1984 called the Qatari Tennis and Squash Federation. In 1986, Qatar Squash Federation joined the World Squash Federation, Arabian Squash Federation and Asian Squash Federation. The Qatari Squash Federation is one of the founders of the Organization Committee, which was founded in August 1989.

It dissociated from the Tennis Federation on 22 January, 2001, when both federations were split into independent entities.
