= Lekgotla Mosope =

Botswana squash player (born 1983)

Personal information
- Born: 25 July 1983 (age 43) Botswana
- Height: 1.83 m (6 ft 0 in)
- Weight: 75 kg (165 lb)

Sport
- Country: Botswana
- Turned pro: 2008
- Coached by: Lefika Ragontse
- Retired: Active
- Racquet used: Harrow

Men's singles
- Highest ranking: No. 132 (March 2010)
- Current ranking: No. 283 (June 2013)
- Updated on June 2013

Lekgotla Mosope (born 25 July 1983) is a professional squash player who represents Botswana. He reached a career-high ranking of World No. 132 on 1 March 2010.
