= Adrian Hansen =

South African squash player (born 1971)

Personal information
- Born: 21 November 1971 (age 54) South Africa

Sport
- Country: South Africa

Men's singles
- Highest ranking: No. 63 (April 1998)
- Updated on February, 2018

Adrian Hansen (born 21 November 1971) is a South African former professional squash player. He reached a career-high Professional Squash Association (PSA) ranking of 63 in the world, in April 1998. Hansen represented his country in the Commonwealth Games in 2006.
