= Johan Jüngling =

Swedish squash player (born 1977)

Personal information
- Nationality: Swedish
- Born: 1 May 1977 (age 47); Jönköping, Sweden

Sport
- Sport: squash
- Club: Växjö SK

Johan Jüngling (born 1 May 1977) is a Swedish former squash player, representing Växjö SK and living in Jönköping. He represented Sweden at several European championships and world championships.

Playing for the Swedish national team for 10 years, he was ranked number-one in Sweden. He won the Swedish national championship eight times as a junior, and four times as a senior. In 2005, he won the Andalucian team championship.
