= Squash Federation of Africa =

African governing body for the sport of squash

- Abbreviation: SFA
- Formation: 1992
- Type: Sports organization
- Headquarters: Johannesburg, Gauteng, South Africa
- Region served: Africa
- Members: 19 member associations
- President: (Zimbabwe) Lucky Mlilo
- Vice-president: (Nigeria) Olufemi Ajagbe (Mauritius) Adrian Wehrli
- General Secretary: (South Africa) Liz Addison
- Parent organization: World Squash Federation
- Website: www.squashafrica.org

The Squash Federation of Africa (SFA) was set up in 1992 regulates squash throughout Africa and the Indian Ocean islands.

It is based in Johannesburg, Gauteng in South Africa. As of 2012 it has 19 member federations.

== Events ==
1. African Squash Championships
2. African Junior Squash Championships

== List of members ==
Nation	Federation	President
Algeria	Algerian Tennis Federation	Mohamed Bouabdallah
Botswana	Botswana Squash Rackets Association	Tiego Rabasha
(Democratic Republic of the Congo) Democratic Republic of Congo	FECODESQ	Simon Yoka
Egypt	Egyptian Squash Association	Assem Khalifa
Ghana	Ghana Squash Association	Mr Richmond Quarcoo
Kenya	Kenya Squash Rackets Association	David Ngunjiri
Lesotho	Lesotho National Squash Association	Boniface Kholoang Mokalanyane
Malawi	Squash Malawi	Chikumbutso Mkutumula
Mauritius	Mauritius Squash Rackets Association	Adrien Wehrli
Morocco	Moroccan Squash Association	Berryane M. El-Ouazzani
Namibia	Namibian Squash Association	Adri Lambert
Nigeria	Nigeria Squash Federation	Boye Oyerinde
Somalia	Somali Squash Federation	Hussein Ali Nor
South Africa	Squash South Africa	Liz Addison
Sudan	Sudan Squash Federation	Mohammed Mergni Hassn Mohammed
Tanzania	Tanzania Squash Rackets Association	Ameen Kashmiri
Uganda	Uganda Squash Rackets Association	Martin Fowler
Zambia	Zambia Squash Association	Davis Chibuye
Zimbabwe	Squash Association of Zimbabwe	Paul Bowen

== See also ==
- All-Africa Games
