= Morten W. Sørensen =

Danish squash player (born 1979)

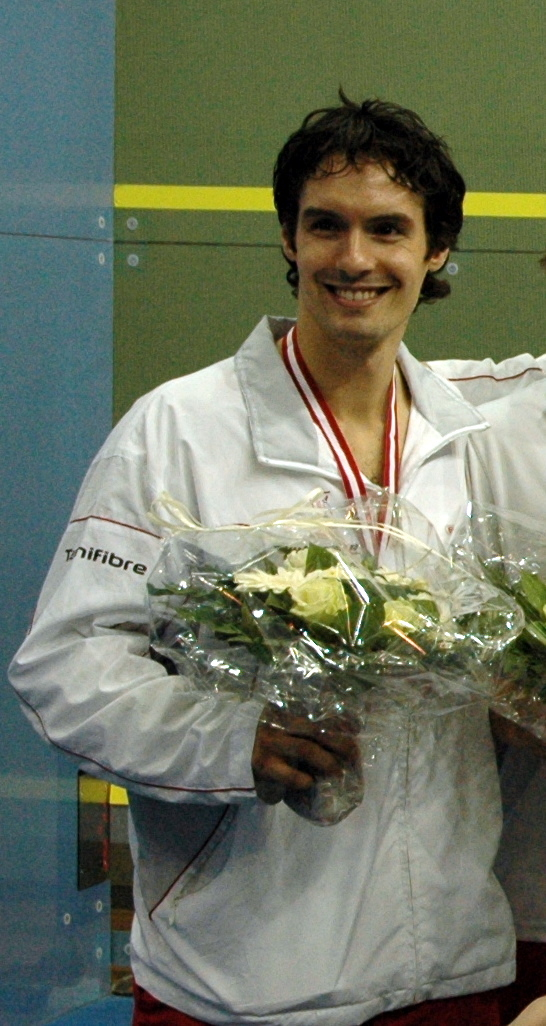

Personal information
- Born: 1 May 1979 (age 47) Copenhagen, Denmark
- Height: 1.8 m (5 ft 11 in)

Sport
- Country: Denmark
- Racquet used: Prince O3 Black

men's singles
- Highest ranking: 91 (June 2005)

Morten Wiegandt Sørensen or Morten Trap Sørensen also simply known as Morten W. Sørensen (born 1 May 1979) is a Danish male professional squash player. He reached his highest career singles ranking of 91 in June 2005.
