= Federation of Panamerica =

Panamerican governing body for the sport of squash

Panamerican Squash Federation
- Abbreviation: FPS
- Formation: 1989
- Type: Sports organization
- Headquarters: Texas, United States of America
- Region served: Americas
- Members: 28 member associations
- President: (Venezuela) Francisco Paradisi
- Vice-president: (Colombia) Sergio Becerra (United States) Dent Wilkens (North America) (Guatemala) Italo Bonatti (Central America) (Barbados) (Paraguay) Esteban Casarinio (South America) (Cayman Islands) Janet Sairsingh (Caribbean)
- Secretary General: (Canada) Lolly Gillen
- Parent organization: World Squash Federation
- Website: https://www.panamsquash.com/

The Panamerican Squash Federation (FPS) was set up in 1989. It is the governing body of squash on the American Continent and shall at all times seek to advance competition in the sport of squash.

It is based in Medellín in Colombia. As of 2011 it has 28 member federations.

== Presidents ==
No.	Years	Name
1	1989–1995	(Colombia) Juan Carlos Barvo
2	1995–1997	(Mexico) Alfredo Martinez
3	1997–2011	(Colombia) Sergio Rodriguez
4	2011–2015	(Guatemala) Marco Antonio Rosales
5	2015–2019	(Mexico) Federico Serna
6	2019–	(Venezuela) Francisco Paradisi

== List of members ==
=== North America ===
Nation	Federation	President
Bermuda	Bermuda Squash Racquets Association	Patrick Foster
Canada	Squash Canada	Lolly Gillen
Mexico	Mexico Squash Federation	Federico Serna Altamirano
United States	U.S. Squash	Kevin Klipstein

=== Central America ===
Nation	Federation	President
Costa Rica	Asociacion de Jugadores de Squash de Costa Rica	
El Salvador	Federacion Salvadoreña de Squash	Vladimir Iglesias
Guatemala	Asociacion Nacional de Squash de Guatemala	Cindy Toscano
Honduras	Honduras Squash Association	
Panama	Confederacion Nacional de Squash de Panama	Ricardo Delgado

=== Caribbean ===
Nation	Federation	President
Antigua and Barbuda	Antigua & Barbuda Squash Rackets Association	
(The Bahamas) Bahamas	Bahamas Squash Association	Adrian Burrows
Barbados	Barbados Squash Association	Alison Smith-Padmore
Bolivia	Federation Boliviana de Squash	Alba Gamarra
British Virgin Islands	The BVI Squash Rackets Association	Mark Chapman
Cayman Islands	Cayman Islands National Squash Association	Janet Sairsingh
Dominican Republic	Federacion Dominicana Republica de Squash	Amado Hernandez
Jamaica	Jamaica Squash Association	Chris Hind
Saint Lucia	St Lucia Squash Rackets Association	
Saint Vincent and the Grenadines	St Vincent & The Grenadines Squash Association	Amber Glasgow
Trinidad and Tobago	The Trinidad & Tobago Squash Association	Diane Julian

=== South America ===
Nation	Federation	President
Argentina	Asociación Argentina de Squash Rackets	Juan Pablo Garcia
Brazil	Brazilian Confederation of squash	Carlos Paiva
Chile	Squash Federation of Chile	Alvaro Carranza
Colombia	Colombian Squash Federation	Pablo Serna
Ecuador	Federacion Ecuatoriana de Squash	Jose Luis Inca
Guyana	Guyana Squash Association	David Fernandes
Paraguay	Asociación Paraguaya de squash	Esteban Casarino
Peru	Federacion Peruana de Squash	Federico Macklenburg
Venezuela	Federacion Venezolana de Squash	Francisco Paradisi

== Events ==
Junior Events
Pan American Junior Championships

Seniors' Events
Pan American Championships
Pan American Team Championships
Pan American Games
