= 2001 Men's World Team Squash Championships =

Men's World Team 2001
- 18th World Men's Team Championship
- Location: Australia
- Date: October 22–28, 2001

Results
- Champions: Australia
- Runners-up: Egypt
- Third place: England

The 2001 Men's World Team Squash Championships took place between October 22 and October 28 in Australia.

Australia won the gold medal.

== Seeds ==
1. Australia
2. Wales
3. England
4. Canada
5. Scotland
6. Egypt
7. France
8. Malaysia
9. Finland
10. Pakistan
11. South Africa
12. (Republic of Ireland) Ireland

== Results ==
=== Pool A ===
Team one	Team two	Score
Australia	Hong Kong	3-0
Australia	(Republic of Ireland) Ireland	3-0
Australia	Norway	3-0
(Republic of Ireland) Ireland	Norway	3-0
(Republic of Ireland) Ireland	Hong Kong	3-0
Hong Kong	Norway	3-0

Pos	Nation	Team	P	W	L	Pts
1	Australia	David Palmer, Stewart Boswell Paul Price, John Williams	3	3	0	6
2	(Republic of Ireland) Ireland	Derek Ryan, Steve Richardson, Liam Kenny, Patrick Foster	3	2	1	4
3	Hong Kong	Faheem Khan, Vincent Cheung, Roger Ngan, Jackie Lee	3	1	2	2
4	Norway	Richard Larsson, Raymond Pettersen, Joakim Salem, Tom Andre Hansen	3	0	3	0

=== Pool B ===
Team one	Team two	Score
South Africa	Germany	3-0
South Africa	Mexico	3-0
South Africa	Wales	2-1
Wales	Mexico	3-0
Wales	Germany	2-1
Germany	Mexico	3-0

Pos	Nation	Team	P	W	L	Pts
1	South Africa	Glenn Whittaker, Adrian Hansen, Mike Tootill, Rodney Durbach	3	3	0	6
2	Wales	Alex Gough, David Evans, Greg Tippings, Gavin Jones	3	2	1	4
3	Germany	Simon Frenz, Florian Pössl, Edgar Schneider, Stefan Leifels	3	1	2	2
4	Mexico	Mariano Aguilar, Armando Zarazua, Octavio Montero, Moises Galvez	3	0	3	0

=== Pool C ===
Team one	Team two	Score
England	Sweden	3-0
England	Pakistan	2-1
England	Kenya	3-0
Pakistan	Kenya	3-0
Pakistan	Sweden	3-0
Sweden	Kenya	3-0

Pos	Nation	Team	P	W	L	Pts
1	England	Lee Beachill, Chris Walker, Mark Chaloner, Paul Johnson	3	3	0	6
2	Pakistan	Mansoor Zaman, Shahid Zaman, Shamsul Islam Khan, Ajaz Azmat	3	2	1	4
3	Sweden	Daniel Forslund, Christian Drakenberg, Badr Abdel Aziz, Johan Jungling	3	1	2	2
4	Kenya	Otto Kwach, Hartaj Bains, Charan Walia, Rajdeep Bains	3	0	3	0

=== Pool D ===
Team one	Team two	Score
Canada	Japan	3-0
Canada	Denmark	3-0
Canada	Finland	3-0
Finland	Denmark	3-0
Finland	Japan	3-0
Denmark	Japan	3-0

Pos	Nation	Team	P	W	L	Pts
1	Canada	Jonathon Power Graham Ryding, Shahier Razik, Kelly Patrick	3	3	0	6
2	Finland	Juha Raumolin, Olli Tuominen, Mika Monto, Janne Kyttanen	3	2	1	4
3	Denmark	Michael Hansen, Mikkel Korsbjerg, Danny Knudsen, Mads Korsbjerg	3	1	2	2
4	Japan	Kimihiko Sano, Takehide Hota, Ron Tanno, Yoshihiro Watanabe	3	0	3	0

=== Pool E ===
Team one	Team two	Score
Malaysia	Austria	3-0
Malaysia	Netherlands	3-0
Scotland	Malaysia	2-1
Scotland	Austria	3-0
Netherlands	Scotland	2-1
Netherlands	Austria	3-0

Pos	Nation	Team	P	W	L	Pts
1	Malaysia	Kenneth Low, Mohd Azlan Iskandar, Ong Beng Hee	3	2	1	4
2	Scotland	John White, Neil Frankland, Martin Heath, Peter O'Hara	3	2	1	4
3	Netherlands	Lucas Buit, Gabor Marges, Tommy Berden, Marc Reus	3	2	1	4
4	Austria	Gerhard Schedlbauer, Andreas Fuchs, Michael Gruber, Markus Rossler	3	0	3	0

=== Pool F ===
Team one	Team two	Score
Egypt	United States	3-0
Egypt	New Zealand	3-0
Egypt	France	2-1
France	United States	3-0
France	New Zealand	3-0
New Zealand	United States	2-1

Pos	Nation	Team	P	W	L	Pts
1	Egypt	Amr Shabana, Omar El Borolossy, Mohammed Abbas, Karim Darwish	3	3	0	6
2	France	Thierry Lincou, Renan Lavigne, Grégory Gaultier, Jean-Michel Arcucci	3	2	1	4
3	New Zealand	Paul Steel, Daniel Sharplin, George Crosby	3	1	2	2
4	United States	Richard Chin, Preston Quick, Damian Walker, Tim Wyant	3	0	3	0

=== Second round ===
Team one	Team two	Score
Scotland	Finland	3-0
Australia	Sweden	3-0
England	Wales	2-1
Egypt	Denmark	3-0
France	Pakistan	2-1
South Africa	Netherlands	2-1
Malaysia	Germany	2-1
Canada	(Republic of Ireland) Ireland	3-0

=== Quarter-finals ===
Team one	Team two	Score
(Wales) Scotland	South Africa	2-1
Australia	France	3-0
England	Malaysia	2-1
Egypt	Canada	2-1

=== Semi-finals ===
Team one	Team two	Score
Australia	England	3-0
Egypt	Scotland	2-1

=== Third Place Play Off ===
Team one	Team two	Score
England	Scotland	3-0

=== Final ===
Australia
3
FINAL
Melbourne, Australia
28 October 2001

Egypt
0

			1	2	3	4	5
1	(Australia) (Egypt)	Paul Price; Omar El Borolossy	9; 2	10; 9	9; 3
2	(Australia) (Egypt)	David Palmer; Karim Darwish	8; 10	9; 1	9; 0	10; 8
3	(Australia) (Egypt)	Stewart Boswell; Mohammed Abbas	9; 0	9; 0

== See also ==
- World Team Squash Championships
- World Squash Federation
- World Open (squash)

Preceded by Egypt; 1999	Squash World Team; Australia; 2001	Succeeded by Austria; 2003
