= 1999 Men's World Team Squash Championships =

Squash competition

Men's World Team 1999
- 17th World Men's Team Championship
- Location: Egypt
- Date: 27 September - 22 September 1999

Results
- Champions: Egypt
- Runners-up: Wales
- Third place: England

The 1999 Men's Al-Ahram World Team Squash Championships were held in Egypt and took place from 17 September until 22 September 1999.

Egypt won the gold medal defeating Wales in the final. England took bronze.

== Seeds ==
1. England
2. Australia
3. Canada
4. Egypt
5. Wales
6. Pakistan
7. South Africa
8. France
9. Finland
10. (South Africa) Malaysia
11. Scotland
12. Germany
13. Sweden
14. New Zealand

== Results ==
=== Pool A ===
Team one	Team two	Score
England	Wales	3-0
England	Egypt	2-1
England	Malaysia	3-0
Egypt	Malaysia	3-0
Egypt	Wales	3-0
Wales	Malaysia	2-1

Pos	Nation	Team	P	W	L	Pts
1	England	Simon Parke, Paul Johnson, Chris Walker, Mark Cairns	3	3	0	6
2	Egypt	Amr Shabana, Ahmed Barada, Omar El Borolossy, Amir Wagih	3	2	1	4
2	Wales	Alex Gough, David Evans, Greg Tippings, Gavin Jones	3	1	2	2
4	Malaysia	Kenneth Low, Mohd Azlan Iskandar, Ong Beng Hee, Yap Kok Four	3	1	2	2

=== Pool B ===
Team one	Team two	Score
Australia	Finland	3-0
Australia	Pakistan	3-0
Australia	Canada	3-0
(Egypt) Canada	Pakistan	3-0
Pakistan	Finland	2-1
Finland	Canada	2-1

Pos	Nation	Team	P	W	L	Pts
1	Australia	Rodney Eyles, Paul Price, Dan Jenson, Anthony Hill	3	3	0	6
2	Canada	Graham Ryding, Shahier Razik, Kelly Patrick	3	1	2	2
2	Finland	Juha Raumolin, Olli Tuominen, Mika Monto, Ville Sistonen	3	1	2	2
4	Pakistan	Amjad Khan, Mansoor Zaman, Mir Zaman Gul, Shahid Zaman	3	1	2	2

=== Pool C ===
Team one	Team two	Score
South Africa	Belgium	3-0
South Africa	Germany	3-0
South Africa	Sweden	3-0
Sweden	Germany	2-1
Sweden	Belgium	3-0
Germany	Belgium	3-0

Pos	Nation	Team	P	W	L	Pts
1	South Africa	Rodney Durbach, Glenn Whittaker, Craig van der Wath, Adrian Hansen	3	2	1	4
2	Sweden	Anders Thoren, Daniel Forslund, Johan Jungling, Christian Drakenberg	3	2	1	4
3	Germany	Simon Frenz, Florian Pössl, Oliver Kowalski, Hansi Seestaller	3	2	1	4
4	Belgium	Peter Pastijn, Wim Houbrechts, Nicolas Van Caesbroeck	3	0	3	0

=== Pool D ===
Team one	Team two	Score
France	Scotland	2-1
France	Switzerland	3-0
France	New Zealand	3-0
New Zealand	Switzerland	2-1
Switzerland	Scotland	2-1
Scotland	New Zealand	2-1

Pos	Nation	Team	P	W	L	Pts
1	France	Thierry Lincou, Renan Lavigne, Jean-Michel Arcucci, Grégory Gaultier	3	3	0	6
2	Scotland*	John White, Neil Frankland, Stuart Cowie, David Heath	3	2	1	4
3	New Zealand	Paul Steel, Daniel Sharplin, George Crosby, Allan Crome	3	1	2	2
4	Switzerland	Andre Holderegger, Reto Donatsch, Lars Harms, Yurij Del Tenno	3	0	3	0

Note*
Scotland were missing the world champion Peter Nicol and world semi-finalist Martin Heath who both refused to play quoting lack of financial assistance.

=== Quarter-finals ===
Team one	Team two	Score
Wales	Canada	2-1
Australia	South Africa	2-1
England	France	3-0
Egypt	Finland	3-0

=== Semi-finals ===
Team one	Team two	Score
Wales	England	2-1
Egypt	Australia	3-0

=== Third Place Play Off ===
Team one	Team two	Score
England	Australia	2-1

=== Final ===
Egypt
3
FINAL
Cairo, Egypt
22 September 1999

Wales
0

			1	2	3	4	5
1	(Egypt) (Wales)	Ahmed Barada; Alex Gough	9; 2	9; 3	4; 9	0; 9	9; 6
2	(Egypt) (Wales)	Omar El Borolossy; David Evans	9; 6	2; 9	10; 8	9; 4
3	(Egypt) (Wales)	Amr Shabana; Greg Tippings	9; 1	9; 6

Preceded by Malaysia; 1997	Squash World Team; Egypt; 1999	Succeeded by Australia; 2001

== See also ==
- World Team Squash Championships
- World Squash Federation
- World Open (squash)
