= 2015 Men's World Team Squash Championships =

Men's World Team 2015
- 25th WSF World Men's Team Championship
- Location: Cairo, Egypt
- Venue: Al Ahly Club, Gezira Island
- Date: Event cancelled
- Website squash999.com/wsfmensteams/

The 2015 Men's World Team Squash Championships was intended to be the men's edition of the 2015 World Team Squash Championships, which serves as the world team championship for squash players. The event was scheduled to take place in Cairo, Egypt from December 12 to December 18, 2015. However, at short notice, it was postponed in the wake of several team withdrawals arising from security concerns and a bomb attack in the Egyptian capital that resulted in 16 fatalities.

On 27 January 2016, the event was formally cancelled.

== See also ==
- World Team Squash Championships
- World Squash Federation
- 2015 Men's World Open Squash Championship

Preceded by France (Mulhouse); 2013	Squash World Team; Cairo (Egypt); 2015	Succeeded by France (Marseille); 2017
