= World Squash Junior Team Championships =

Junior team squash world championships

Details
- Event name: World Junior Championship
- Website wsfworldjuniors.com

The World Squash Junior Team Championships are the junior world team championships of squash conducted by World Squash. It is held biennially. The men's team event was held unofficially from 1973 to 1979.

== Men's team ==
The team event was started unofficially in April 1973 to coincide with the British Junior Open tournament which was held annually in Britain. Only four countries (England, Scotland, Wales and Sweden) took part in the event which was held at the courts of the National Westminster Bank Sports Ground in South London, playing for a shield presented by the bank.

The official men's world team championship tournament has been held since 1980. It has been won by 4 countries. The record number of countries participating in a single men's team tournament is 31, in the 2000 and the 2008 tournament held in Milan, Italy and Zürich, Switzerland respectively.

*	Unofficial championship^{[a]}

Year	Winner	Score in final	Runner-up	Third place	Fourth place
1973	England	–	Sweden	Wales	Scotland
1974	England	–	South Africa	Scotland	Wales
1975	England	–	Egypt	Scotland	Wales
1976	England	–	Sweden	Scotland	Wales
1977	England	–	Sweden	Ireland	Wales
1978	Australia	–	Sweden	England	Pakistan
1979	Pakistan	–	England	Canada	Sweden
1980	Australia (1)	2–1	Pakistan (1)	New Zealand (1)	England (1)
1982	Pakistan (1)	2–1	Australia (1)	England (1)	New Zealand (1)
1984	Australia (2)	2–1	England (1)	Pakistan (1)	Canada (1)
1986	Australia (3)	3–0	England (2)	Pakistan (2)	Canada (2)
1988	Australia (4)	2–1	Pakistan (2)	England (2)	New Zealand (2)
1990	England (1)	2–1	Australia (2)	Pakistan (3)	Finland (1)
1992	Australia (5)	2–1	England (3)	Canada (1)	Egypt (1)
1994	Egypt (1)	3–0	England (4)	Finland (1)	Australia (1)
1996	England (2)	2–1	Egypt (1)	Pakistan (4)	Switzerland (1)
1998	England (3)	2–1	Egypt (2)	Pakistan (5)	France (1)
2000	England (4)	2–1	Egypt (3)	Pakistan (6)	France (2)
2002	Pakistan (2)	2–1	England (5)	Egypt (1)	Australia (2)
2004	Pakistan (3)	2–1	Egypt (4)	England (3)	Kuwait (1)
2006	Egypt (2)	2–1	Pakistan (3)	Malaysia (1)	England (2)
2008	Pakistan (4)	2–0	Egypt (5)	England (4)	India (1)
2010	Egypt (3)	2–1	Pakistan (4)	Canada (2)	England (3)
2012	Egypt (4)	2–0	Pakistan (5)	India (1)	England (4)
2014	Egypt (5)	2–0	Pakistan (6)	Spain (1)	Malaysia (1)
2016	Pakistan (5)	2–1	Egypt (6)	England (5) / United States (1)	
2018	Egypt (6)	2–0	England (6)	Czech Republic (1) / United States (2)	
2020	Cancelled due to COVID-19 pandemic in Australia.				
2022	England (5)	2–1	Egypt (7)	Malaysia (2) / Pakistan (7)	
2024	Egypt (7)	2–0	South Korea (1)	Colombia (1) / United States (3)	
2025	Egypt (8)	2–0	United States (1)	England (6) / India (2)	
2026	Egypt (9)	2–0	United States (2)	France (3) / India (3)	

== Women's team ==
The official women's world team championship tournament has been held since 1985. It has been won by 4 different countries. The highest number of countries participating in a single tournament is 20, in the 2005 tournament held in Herentals, Belgium.

Year	Winner	Score in final	Runner-up	Third place	Fourth place
1985	Australia (1)	2–1	England (1)	New Zealand (1)	Scotland (1)
1987	England (1)	2–1	Australia (1)	New Zealand (2)	Canada (1)
1989	England (2)	–	Australia (2)	West Germany (1)	New Zealand (1)
1991	England (3)	3–0	Australia (3)	West Germany (2)	New Zealand (2)
1993	Australia (2)	2–1	New Zealand (1)	Egypt (1)	England (1)
1995	Australia (3)	2–1	England (2)	New Zealand (3)	Germany (1)
1997	England (4)	2–1	New Zealand (2)	Malaysia (1)	Belgium (1)
1999	Egypt (1)	2–1	England (3)	Malaysia (2)	Australia (1)
2001	England (5)	2–1	Malaysia (1)	Egypt (2)	United States (1)
2003	Egypt (2)	3–0	Australia (4)	England (1)	India (1)
2005	Hong Kong (1)	2–1	Egypt (2)	England (3)	United States (2)
2007	Egypt (3)	2–0	Malaysia (2)	New Zealand (4)	Hong Kong (1)
2009	Egypt (4)	2–0	Hong Kong (1)	India (1)	United States (3)
2011	Egypt (5)	2–1	United States (1)	Hong Kong (1)	India (3)
2013	Egypt (6)	2–0	United States (2)	Hong Kong (2)	England (2)
2015	Egypt (7)	2–0	United States (3)	England (4) / Malaysia (3)	
2017	Egypt (8)	2–0	Malaysia (3)	England (5) / Hong Kong (4)	
2019	Egypt (9)	2–0	Malaysia (4)	England (6) / Hong Kong (5)	
2023	Egypt (10)	2–0	Malaysia (5)	England (7) / United States (4)	
2024	Egypt (11)	2–0	United States (4)	Canada (2) / Malaysia (4)	
2025	Egypt (12)	2–0	Hong Kong (2)	England (8) / United States (5)	
2026	Egypt (13)	2–0	Malaysia (6)	Hong Kong (6) / United States (6)	

== Statistics ==
=== Men's team ===
9	Egypt

5	Australia

5	Pakistan

5	England

=== Women's team ===
13	Egypt

5	England

3	Australia

1	Hong Kong

== See also ==
- World Squash Junior Championships
- World Squash Team Championships
- World Squash Championships
- British Junior Open Squash
