= Egypt women's national junior squash team =

Egypt
- Coach: Omneya Abdel Kawy
- Association: Egyptian Squash Association
- Colors: Black & Red

World Team Championships
- First year: 1993
- Titles: 13 (1999, 2003, 2007, 2009, 2011, 2013, 2015, 2017, 2019, 2023, 2024, 2025, 2026)
- Runners-up: 1
- Best finish: 1st
- Entries: 18

The Egypt women's national junior squash team represents Egypt in international squash team competitions, and is governed by Egyptian Squash Association.

Since 1993, Egypt has won 13 World Junior Team Championships titles. Their most recent title came in 2026.

== Current team ==
The following players represented Egypt in the WSF Women's World Junior Team Championship 2025.

- Sohayla Hazem
- Nadien Elhammamy
- Janna Galal
- Amina Orfi

== Results ==
=== World Junior Team Championships ===
Year	Result	Position	W	L
(Republic of Ireland) Dublin 1985	Did not present			
(England) Brighton 1987	Did not present			
(New Zealand) Hamilton 1989	Did not present			
(Norway) Bergen 1991	Did not present			
(Malaysia) Kuala Lumpur 1993	Semi Final	3rd	6	2
(Australia) Sydney 1995	Quarter Final	7th	3	3
(Brazil) Rio de Janeiro 1997	Quarter Final	6th	4	2
(Belgium) Antwerp 1999	Champions	1st	7	0
(Malaysia) Penang 2001	Semi Final	3rd	5	1
(Egypt) Cairo 2003	Champions	1st	6	0
(Belgium) Herentals 2005	Final	2nd	4	1
Hong Kong 2007	Champions	1st	7	0
(India) Chennai 2009	Champions	1st	6	0
(United States) Boston 2011	Champions	1st	6	0
(Poland) Wrocław 2013	Champions	1st	6	0
(Netherlands) Eindhoven 2015	Champions	1st	6	0
(New Zealand) Tauranga 2017	Champions	1st	5	0
(Malaysia) Kuala Lumpur 2019	Champions	1st	6	0
2021	Cancelled			
(Australia) Melbourne 2023	Champions	1st	5	0
(United States) Houston 2024	Champions	1st	6	0
(Egypt) New Cairo 2025	Champions	1st	6	0
(Canada) Ontario 2026	Champions	1st	6	0
Total	18/22	13 Titles	100	9

== See also ==
- Squash in Egypt
- Egyptian Squash Association
- World Junior Squash Championships
- Egypt men's national squash team
- Egypt women's national squash team
- Egypt men's national junior squash team
