= 2018 Women's World Team Squash Championships =

Women's World Team 2018
- 21st WSF World Women's Team Championship
- Location: Dalian, China
- Date(s): September 27 – December 3, 2016
- Teams: 16 (from all the 5 confederations)
- Website www.wsfwomensteams.com

Results
- Champions: Egypt
- Runners-up: England
- Third place: France / Hong Kong

The 2018 Women's World Team Squash Championships was the women's edition of the 2018 World Team Squash Championships, which serves as the world team championship for squash players. The event was held in Dalian, China from 11 to 19 September 2018. The tournament was organized by the World Squash Federation and the Chinese Squash Association. The Egypt team won its fourth World Team Championships, beating the England team in the final.

== Participating teams ==
16 teams competed in these world championships from all of the five confederations: Africa, America, Asia, Europe and Oceania.

Africa (SFA)	America (FPS)	Asia (ASF)	Europe (ESF)	Oceania (OSF)
Egypt (Title holder); South Africa	Canada; United States	China (Host country); Hong Kong; India; Japan; Malaysia	England; Finland; France; Germany; Switzerland	Australia; New Zealand

== Seeds ==
1. Egypt
2. England
3. United States
4. Malaysia
5. Hong Kong
6. France
7. New Zealand
8. Canada

== Squads ==
Egypt

- Nour El Sherbini
- Nour El Tayeb
- Nouran Gohar
- Raneem El Weleily

Canada

- Danielle Letourneau
- Hollie Naughton
- Nikki Todd
- Samantha Cornett

Australia

- Alex Haydon
- Christine Nunn
- Donna Lobban
- Sarah Cardwell

Germany

- Annika Wiese
- Franziska Hennes
- Nele Hatschek
- Saskia Beinhard

England

- Laura Massaro
- Alison Waters
- Sarah-Jane Perry
- Victoria Lust

New Zealand

- Abbie Palmer
- Amanda Landers-Murphy
- Joelle King
- Kaitlyn Watts

Japan

- Ayumi Watanabe
- Misaki Kobayashi
- Risa Sugimoto
- Satomi Watanabe

Finland

- Emilia Korhonen
- Emilia Soini
- Riina Koskinen

United States

- Amanda Sobhy
- Olivia Blatchford
- Reeham Sedky
- Sabrina Sobhy

France

- Camille Serme
- Coline Aumard
- Énora Villard
- Mélissa Alves

India

- Aparajitha Balamurukan
- Dimple Mathivanan
- Sunayna Kuruvilla
- Tanvi Khanna

China

- Dou Ying
- He Xinru
- Li Dong Jin
- Peng Zhenni

Malaysia

- Aifa Azman
- Low Wee Wern
- Nicol David
- Sivasangari Subramaniam

Hong Kong

- Annie Au
- Ho Tze-Lok
- Joey Chan
- Lee Ka Yi

South Africa

- Alexandra Fuller
- Elani Landman
- Lizelle Muller
- Milnay Louw

Switzerland

- Céline Walser
- Cindy Merlo
- Gaby Hubber
- Nadia Pfister

== Group stage ==
=== Pool A ===
11 September

Egypt	3 – 0	Australia
Canada	3 - 0	Germany

12 September

Egypt	3 – 0	Canada
Australia	3 - 0	Germany

13 September

Egypt	3 – 0	Germany
Canada	2 - 1	Australia

Rank	Nation	Match	Win	Low	Points
1	Egypt	3	3	0	6
2	Canada	3	2	1	4
3	Australia	3	1	2	2
4	Germany	3	0	3	0

=== Pool B ===
11 September

England	3 – 0	Japan
New Zealand	3 - 0	Finland

12 September

England	3 – 0	New Zealand
Japan	3 - 0	Finland

13 September

New Zealand	2 - 1	Japan
England	3 – 0	Finland

Rank	Nation	Match	Win	Low	Points
1	England	3	3	0	6
2	New Zealand	3	2	1	4
3	Japan	3	1	2	2
4	Finland	3	0	3	0

=== Pool C ===
11 September

United States	3 – 0	India
France	3 - 0	China

12 September

India	3 - 0	China
United States	3 – 0	France

13 September

United States	3 – 0	China
France	3 - 0	India

Rank	Nation	Match	Win	Low	Points
1	United States	3	3	0	6
2	France	3	2	1	4
3	India	3	1	2	2
4	China	3	0	3	0

=== Pool D ===
11 September

Malaysia	3 – 0	South Africa
Hong Kong	3 - 0	Switzerland

12 September

Malaysia	3 – 0	Hong Kong
South Africa	3 - 0	Switzerland

13 September

Hong Kong	3 - 0	South Africa
Malaysia	3 – 0	Switzerland

Rank	Nation	Match	Win	Low	Points
1	Malaysia	3	3	0	6
2	Hong Kong	3	2	1	4
3	South Africa	3	1	2	2
4	Switzerland	3	0	3	0

== Finals ==
=== Draw ===
Quarter-finals
1	Egypt	0	3	3
7	New Zealand	3	0	0
3	United States	2	1	2
5	Hong Kong	3	3	0
6	France	3	3	0
4	Malaysia	0	1	2
8	Canada	1	0	2
2	England	3	3	0

Semi-finals
1	Egypt	3	2	3
5	Hong Kong	0	3	0
6	France	1	3	0
2	England	3	2	3

Final
1	Egypt	3	3
2	England	2	1

=== Results ===
==== Quarter-finals ====
Egypt
2
Quarter-finals 1
Dalian, China
14 September 2018

New Zealand
1

			1	2	3	4	5
1	(Egypt) (New Zealand)	Nour El Sherbini; Joelle King	9; 11	9; 11	7; 11
2	(Egypt) (New Zealand)	Raneem El Weleily; Amanda Landers-Murphy	11; 4	11; 3	11; 2
3	(Egypt) (New Zealand)	Nour El Tayeb; Abbie Palmer	11; 2	11; 3	11; 4

United States
1
Quarter-finals 2
Dalian, China
14 September 2018

Hong Kong
2

			1	2	3	4	5
1	(United States) (Hong Kong)	Amanda Sobhy; Annie Au	8; 11	11; 9	4; 11	12; 10	5; 11
2	(United States) (Hong Kong)	Olivia Blatchford; Joey Chan	5; 11	11; 8	7; 11	11; 13
3	(United States) (Hong Kong)	Sabrina Sobhy; Ho Tze-Lok	11; 8	11; 5

France
2
Quarter-finals 3
Dalian, China
14 September 2018

Malaysia
1

			1	2	3	4	5
1	(France) (Malaysia)	Camille Serme; Nicol David	11; 9	11; 2	11; 5
2	(France) (Malaysia)	Coline Aumard; Sivasangari Subramaniam	8; 11	11; 8	11; 8	11; 8
3	(France) (Malaysia)	Mélissa Alvès; Low Wee Wern	7; 11	8; 11

Canada
1
Quarter-finals 4
Dalian, China
14 September 2018

England
2

			1	2	3	4	5
1	(Canada) (England)	Samantha Cornett; Laura Massaro	11; 7	8; 11	6; 11	11; 13
2	(Canada) (England)	Hollie Naughton; Alison Waters	1; 11	6; 11	6; 11
3	(Canada) (England)	Nikki Todd; Victoria Lust	11; 6	11; 7

==== Semi finals ====
Egypt
2
Semi-final 1
Dalian, China
15 September 2018

Hong Kong
1

			1	2	3	4	5
1	(Egypt) (Hong Kong)	Raneem El Weleily; Joey Chan	11; 8	11; 8	11; 9
2	(Egypt) (Hong Kong)	Nour El Sherbini; Annie Au	7; 11	11; 8	9; 11	12; 10	3; 11
3	(Egypt) (Hong Kong)	Nour El Tayeb; Lee Ka Yi	11; 6	11; 5	11; 6

France
1
Semi-final 2
Dalian, China
15 September 2018

England
2

			1	2	3	4	5
1	(France) (England)	Coline Aumard; Sarah-Jane Perry	7; 11	11; 7	7; 11	6; 11
2	(France) (England)	Camille Serme; Laura Massaro	9; 11	11; 8	9; 11	11; 8	11; 7
3	(France) (England)	Mélissa Alvès; Alison Waters	6; 11	3; 11	10; 12

==== Final ====
Egypt
2
Final
Dalian, China
16 September 2018

England
0

			1	2	3	4	5
1	(Egypt) (England)	Nouran Gohar; Alison Waters	11; 9	11; 9	6; 11	7; 11	11; 7
2	(Egypt) (England)	Raneem El Weleily; Laura Massaro	11; 3	11; 8	9; 11	11; 3
3	(Egypt) (England)	Nour El Tayeb; Sarah-Jane Perry						not played

== Final standings ==
Pos.	Team
1st place, gold medalist(s)	Egypt
2nd place, silver medalist(s)	England
3rd place, bronze medalist(s)	France
3rd place, bronze medalist(s)	Hong Kong
5	United States
6	Malaysia
7	Canada
8	New Zealand

Pos.	Team
9	Australia
10	South Africa
11	Japan
12	India
13	Switzerland
14	Germany
15	Finland
16	China

== See also ==
- World Team Squash Championships

Preceded by France (Issy-les-Moulineaux); 2016	Squash World Team; China (Dalian); 2018	Succeeded by Egypt (Cairo); 2022
