= Egypt national squash team =

Egypt national squash team may refer to:

- Egypt men's national squash team
- Egypt women's national squash team
