= 2017 Women's World Junior Team Squash Championships =

Women's World Junior Team 2017
- 17th WSF Women's World Junior Team Championships
- Location: (New Zealand) Tauranga
- Website www.wsfworldjuniors.com

Results
- Champion: Egypt
- Runner-up: Malaysia
- Third place: England / Hong Kong

The 2017 Women's World Junior Team Squash Championships was held in Tauranga, New Zealand. The event took place from 25 to 29 July 2017.

== Seeds ==
1. Egypt
2. Malaysia
3. England
4. Hong Kong
5. United States
6. India
7. Canada
8. New Zealand

== Group stage ==
=== Pool A ===
Egypt	3–0	Australia
Egypt	3–0	New Zealand
New Zealand	2–1	Australia

Rank	Nation	Match	Win	Lost	Points
1	Egypt	2	2	0	4
2	New Zealand	2	1	1	2
3	Australia	2	0	2	0

=== Pool B ===
Malaysia	3–0	Germany
Malaysia	3–0	Canada
Canada	1–2	Germany

Rank	Nation	Match	Win	Lost	Points
1	Malaysia	2	2	0	4
2	Germany	2	1	1	2
3	Canada	2	0	2	0

=== Pool C ===
England	3–0	France
India	3–0	South Africa
England	3–0	India
France	1–2	South Africa
India	2–1	France
England	3–0	South Africa

Rank	Nation	Match	Win	Lost	Points
1	England	3	3	0	6
2	India	3	2	1	4
3	South Africa	3	1	2	2
4	France	3	0	3	0

=== Pool D ===
Hong Kong	3–0	South Korea
United States	3–0	Ireland
Hong Kong	2–1	United States
South Korea	3–0	Ireland
Hong Kong	3–0	Ireland
United States	3–0	South Korea

Rank	Nation	Match	Win	Lost	Points
1	Hong Kong	3	3	0	6
2	United States	3	2	1	4
3	South Korea	3	1	2	2
4	Ireland	3	0	3	0

== Knockout stage ==
=== Ninth to fourteenth place ===
==== Bracket ====
First round
South Africa	3	3	3
Ireland	0	0	0
France	0	0	2
South Korea	3	3	1

Semifinals
Australia	3	0	3
South Africa	2	3	0
Canada	3	3	0
South Korea	0	1	3
Play-off 13/14
Ireland	0	3	1
France	3	0	3

Play-off 9/10
Australia	1	0	0
Canada	3	3	2
Play-off 11/12
South Africa	w	/	o
South Korea

=== Finals ===
==== Bracket ====
Quarter-finals
1	Egypt	3	3	2
Germany	0	0	0
4	Hong Kong	1	3	3
6	India	3	0	0
5	United States	0	3	0
3	England	3	2	3
8	New Zealand	0	0	1
2	Malaysia	3	3	2

Semi-finals
1	Egypt	3	3
4	Hong Kong	0	0
3	England	1	0
2	Malaysia	3	3

Final
1	Egypt	3	3
2	Malaysia	1	1

5–8th place bracket

Semi-finals 5-8
Germany	0	1
India	3	3
United States	3	3
New Zealand	0	0

Play-off 5/6
India	0	3	0
United States	3	1	3
Play-off 7/8
Germany	1	0
New Zealand	3	3

==== Semi-finals ====
Egypt
2
Semi-final 1
Tauranga, New Zealand
28 July 2017

Hong Kong
0

			1	2	3	4	5
1	(Egypt) (Hong Kong)	Amina Yousry; Chan Sin Yuk	11; 4	11; 3	11; 7
2	(Egypt) (Hong Kong)	Hania El Hammamy; Lui Hiu Lam	11; 4	11; 6	11; 1
3	(Egypt) (Hong Kong)	Rowan Reda Araby; Cheng Nga Ching						not played

England
0
Semi-final 2
Tauranga, New Zealand
28 July 2017

Malaysia
2

			1	2	3	4	5
1	(England) (Malaysia)	Jasmine Hutton; Aifa Azman	11; 6	10; 12	10; 12	6; 11
2	(England) (Malaysia)	Lucy Turmel; Sivasangari Subramaniam	8; 11	8; 11	4; 11
3	(England) (Malaysia)	Elise Lazarus; Andrea Lee						not played

==== Final ====
Egypt
2
Final
Tauranga, New Zealand
29 July 2017

Malaysia
0

			1	2	3	4	5
1	(Egypt) (Malaysia)	Hania El Hammamy; Sivasangari Subramaniam	11; 8	11; 8	6; 11	11; 9
2	(Egypt) (Malaysia)	Rowan Reda Araby; Andrea Lee	11; 4	11; 4	9; 11	11; 7
3	(Egypt) (Malaysia)	Amina Yousry; Zoe Foo Yuk Han						not played

== Final standing ==
Rank	Team
1	Egypt
2	Malaysia
3	England
3	Hong Kong
5	United States
6	India
7	New Zealand
8	Germany
9	Canada
10	Australia
11	South Africa
12	South Korea
13	France
14	Ireland

== See also ==
- World Junior Squash Championships

Preceded by Netherlands (Eindhoven); 2015	Squash World Junior Team; New Zealand (Tauranga); 2017	Succeeded by Malaysia (Kuala Lumpur); 2019
