= 2022 Women's World Team Squash Championships =

World Team Squash Championship

2022 Women's World Team
- 22nd WSF World Women's Team Championship
- Location: Cairo, Egypt
- Date: 10–16 December 2022
- Teams: 17 (from all the 5 confederations)
- Website www.wsfwomensteams.com

Results
- Champions: Egypt
- Runners-up: United States
- Third place: England / Malaysia

The 2022 Women's World Team Squash Championships was the women's edition of the 2022 World Team Squash Championships, which serves as the world team championship for squash players. The event, held at the Madinaty Sports Club in Cairo, took place from 10 to 16 December 2022. The tournament was organised by the World Squash Federation.

The Egypt team won its fifth World Team Championships, beating the United States team in the final. England and Malaysia won bronze medals.

Two teams made debuts at the championship, with Chinese Taipei and Ukraine appearing for the first time.

After the tournament, Japan's Satomi Watanabe was named Tournament MVP after winning all of her matches, while South Africa were named Team of the Tournament.

== Participating teams ==
17 teams competed in these world championships from all of the five confederations: Africa, America, Asia, Europe and Oceania.

Africa (SFA)	America (FPS)	Asia (ASF)	Europe (ESF)	Oceania (OSF)
Egypt (Host country) & (Title holder); South Africa	Canada; United States	Hong Kong; Japan; Malaysia; Chinese Taipei	England; Finland; France; Germany; Scotland; Switzerland; Ukraine; Wales	Australia

== Squads ==
Australia

- Alex Haydon
- Jessica Turnbull
- Donna Lobban
- Sarah Cardwell

Canada

- Nicole Bunyan
- Hollie Naughton
- Nikki Todd
- Samantha Cornett

Chinese Taipei

- Yi-Hsuan Lee
- Yuan Wang
- Wei-Ting Huang
- Yi-Chun Wu

Egypt

- Nour El Sherbini
- Nour El Tayeb
- Nouran Gohar
- Hania El Hammamy

England

- Jasmine Hutton
- Lucy Turmel
- Sarah-Jane Perry
- Julianne Courtice

Finland

- Emilia Korhonen
- Emilia Soini
- Riina Koskinen
- Maarit Ekholm-Mangaonkar

France

- Camille Serme
- Coline Aumard
- Énora Villard
- Mélissa Alves

Germany

- Maya Weishar
- Sharon Sinclair
- Katerina Tycova
- Saskia Beinhard

Hong Kong

- Tomato Ho
- Chan Sin Yuk
- Lee Ka Yi
- Tong Tsz Wing

Japan

- Akari Midorikawa
- Erisa Sano Herring
- Risa Sugimoto
- Satomi Watanabe

Malaysia

- Aifa Azman
- Rachel Arnold
- Chan Yiwen
- Yee Xin Ying

Scotland

- Lisa Aitken
- Georgia Adderley
- Alison Thomson
- Katriona Allen

South Africa

- Alexandra Fuller
- Hayley Ward
- Lizelle Muller
- Cheyna Wood

Switzerland

- Céline Walser
- Cindy Merlo
- Ambre Allinckx
- Nadia Pfister

Ukraine

- Anastasiia Kostiukovay
- Milena Velychko
- Anastasiia Krykun
- Daria Vlasenko

United States

- Amanda Sobhy
- Olivia Fiechter
- Olivia Clyne
- Sabrina Sobhy

Wales

- Emily Whitlock
- Lowri Roberts
- Stacey Gooding
- Elin Harlow

== Results ==
=== Group stage ===
Pool A

10 December

Egypt	3 – 0	Switzerland

11 December

Canada	2 – 1	Wales
Egypt	3 - 0	Wales

12 December

Canada	2 – 1	Switzerland

13 December

Egypt	3 – 0	Canada
Switzerland	2 - 1	Wales

Rank	Nation	Match	Win	Low	Points
1	Egypt	3	3	0	6
2	Canada	3	2	1	4
3	Switzerland	3	1	2	2
4	Wales	3	0	3	0

Pool B

10 December

United States	3 – 0	Australia

11 December

Scotland	3 – 0	Germany
United States	3 - 0	Germany

12 December

Scotland	2 – 1	Australia

13 December

United States	3 – 0	Scotland
Australia	2 - 1	Germany

Rank	Nation	Match	Win	Low	Points
1	United States	3	3	0	6
2	Scotland	3	2	1	4
3	Australia	3	1	2	2
4	Germany	3	0	3	0

Pool C

10 December

England	3 – 0	South Africa

11 December

England	3 – 3	Ukraine
Hong Kong	3 - 0	Ukraine

12 December

Hong Kong	2 – 1	South Africa

13 December

Hong Kong	2 – 1	England
South Africa	3 - 0	Ukraine

Rank	Nation	Match	Win	Low	Points
1	Hong Kong	3	3	0	6
2	England	3	2	1	4
3	South Africa	3	1	2	2
4	Ukraine	3	0	3	0

Pool D

10 December

France	2 – 1	Japan
Malaysia	3 - 0	Chinese Taipei

11 December

Malaysia	3 – 0	Finland
France	3 - 0	Chinese Taipei
France	3 - 0	Finland
Japan	3 - 0	Chinese Taipei

12 December

Finland	3 – 0	Chinese Taipei
Malaysia	2 - 1	Japan

13 December

Japan	3 – 0	Finland
France	2 - 1	Malaysia

Rank	Nation	Match	Win	Low	Points
1	France	4	4	0	8
2	Malaysia	4	3	1	6
3	Japan	4	2	2	4
4	Finland	4	1	3	2
5	Chinese Taipei	4	0	4	0

=== Quarter-finals ===
Egypt
3
Quarter-final 1
Cairo, Egypt
14 December 2022

Scotland
0

			1	2	3	4	5
1	(Egypt) (Scotland)	Nouran Gohar; Georgia Adderley	11; 6	11; 4	11; 3
2	(Egypt) (Scotland)	Hania El Hammamy; Katriona Allen	11; 2	11; 3	11; 2
3	(Egypt) (Scotland)	Nour El Sherbini; Alison Thomson	11; 3	11; 3

Malaysia
3
Quarter-final 2
Cairo, Egypt
14 December 2022

Hong Kong
0

			1	2	3	4	5
1	(Malaysia) (Hong Kong)	Aifa Azman; Chan Sin Yuk	11; 5	11; 5	8; 11	12; 10
2	(Malaysia) (Hong Kong)	Chan Yiwen; Tong Tsz-Wing	11; 1	7; 11	11; 0	10; 12	11; 6
3	(Malaysia) (Hong Kong)	Rachel Arnold; Lee Ka Yi	11; 6	6; 11	11; 7

England
2
Quarter-final 3
Cairo, Egypt
14 December 2022

France
1

			1	2	3	4	5
1	(England) (France)	Sarah-Jane Perry; Mélissa Alvès	11; 7	8; 11	2; 11	6; 11
2	(England) (France)	Lucy Turmel; Coline Aumard	9; 11	11; 6	11; 6	11; 3
3	(England) (France)	Jasmine Hutton; Camille Serme	11; 4	11; 5	11; 4

United States
3
Quarter-final 4
Cairo, Egypt
14 December 2022

Canada
0

			1	2	3	4	5
1	(United States) (Canada)	Amanda Sobhy; Hollie Naughton	11; 7	8; 11	11; 4	10; 12	14; 12
2	(United States) (Canada)	Sabrina Sobhy; Nikki Todd	11; 5	11; 6	11; 1
3	(United States) (Canada)	Olivia Fiechter; Nicole Bunyan	11; 3	11; 6

=== Semi finals ===
Egypt
2
Semi-final 1
Cairo, Egypt
15 December 2022

Malaysia
0

			1	2	3	4	5
1	(Egypt) (Malaysia)	Hania El Hammamy; Chan Yiwen	11; 8	11; 2	11; 5
2	(Egypt) (Malaysia)	Nouran Gohar; Aifa Azman	11; 8	13; 11	3; 11	11; 4
3	(Egypt) (Malaysia)	Nour El Sherbini; Rachel Arnold						not played

United States
2
Semi-final 2
Cairo, Egypt
15 December 2022

England
0

			1	2	3	4	5
1	(United States) (England)	Sabrina Sobhy; Julianne Courtice	11; 5	11; 5	11; 3
2	(United States) (England)	Amanda Sobhy; Jasmine Hutton	10; 12	13; 11	11; 7	11; 2
3	(United States) (England)	Olivia Fiechter; Lucy Turmel						not played

=== Final ===
Egypt
2
Final
Cairo, Egypt
16 December 2022

United States
0

			1	2	3	4	5
1	(Egypt) (United States)	Nouran Gohar; Amanda Sobhy	11; 7	5; 11	10; 12	13; 11	11; 8
2	(Egypt) (United States)	Nour El Sherbini; Olivia Fiechter	11; 3	11; 4	11; 5
3	(Egypt) (United States)	Hania El Hammamy; Sabrina Sobhy						not played

== Final standings ==
Pos.	Team
1st place, gold medalist(s)	Egypt
2nd place, silver medalist(s)	United States
3rd place, bronze medalist(s)	England
3rd place, bronze medalist(s)	Malaysia
5	Hong Kong
6	France
7	Canada
8	Scotland

Pos.	Team
9	South Africa
10	Japan
11	Australia
12	Switzerland
13	Germany
14	Wales
15	Finland
16	Ukraine
17	Chinese Taipei

== See also ==
- World Team Squash Championships

Preceded by China (Dalian); 2018	Squash World Team; Egypt (Cairo); 2022	Succeeded by tbd 2024
