= 2019 Women's World Junior Team Squash Championships =

Women's World Junior Team 2019
- 18th WSF Women's World Junior Team Championships
- Location: (Malaysia) Kuala Lumpur
- Website www.wsfworldjuniors.com

Results
- Champion: Egypt
- Runner-up: Malaysia
- Third place: England / Hong Kong

The 2019 Women's World Junior Team Squash Championships was held in Kuala Lumpur, Malaysia. The event took place from 5 to 9 August 2019.

The defending champions of this tournament is Egypt women's team that won against Malaysia in the 2017 edition.

== Seeds ==
1. Egypt
2. Malaysia
3. Hong Kong
4. England
5. United States
6. India
7. Canada
8. Switzerland

== Group stage ==
=== Pool A ===
Date	Matches		
5 Aug	Egypt	3–0	Singapore
5 Aug	Switzerland	2–1	France
6 Aug	Egypt	3–0	France
6 Aug	Switzerland	3–0	Singapore
7 Aug	Egypt	3–0	Switzerland
7 Aug	France	3–0	Singapore

Rank	Nation	Match	Win	Lost	Points
1	Egypt	3	3	0	6
2	Switzerland	3	2	1	4
3	France	3	1	2	2
4	Singapore	3	0	3	0

=== Pool B ===
Date	Matches		
5 Aug	Malaysia	3–0	Japan
5 Aug	Canada	1–2	Australia
6 Aug	Malaysia	3–0	Australia
6 Aug	Canada	3–0	Japan
7 Aug	Malaysia	3–0	Canada
7 Aug	Australia	2–1	Japan

Rank	Nation	Match	Win	Lost	Points
1	Malaysia	3	3	0	6
2	Australia	3	2	1	4
3	Canada	3	1	2	2
4	Japan	3	0	3	0

=== Pool C ===
Date	Matches		
5 Aug	Hong Kong	3–0	New Zealand
5 Aug	India	3–0	Chinese Taipei
5 Aug	Hong Kong	3–0	Ireland
5 Aug	New Zealand	3–0	Chinese Taipei
6 Aug	India	3–0	Ireland
6 Aug	Hong Kong	3–0	Chinese Taipei
6 Aug	India	3–0	New Zealand
6 Aug	Ireland	3–0	Chinese Taipei
7 Aug	Hong Kong	3–0	India
7 Aug	New Zealand	3–0	Ireland

Rank	Nation	Match	Win	Lost	Points
1	Hong Kong	4	4	0	8
2	India	4	3	1	6
3	New Zealand	4	2	2	4
4	Ireland	4	1	3	2
5	Chinese Taipei	4	0	4	0

=== Pool D ===
Date	Matches		
5 Aug	England	3–0	South Korea
5 Aug	United States	3–0	Sweden
5 Aug	England	3–0	South Africa
5 Aug	South Korea	2–1	Sweden
6 Aug	United States	3–0	South Africa
6 Aug	England	3–0	Sweden
6 Aug	United States	3–0	South Korea
6 Aug	South Africa	2–1	Sweden
7 Aug	England	2–1	United States
7 Aug	South Korea	0–3	South Africa

Rank	Nation	Match	Win	Lost	Points
1	England	4	4	0	8
2	United States	4	3	1	6
3	South Africa	4	2	2	4
4	South Korea	4	1	3	2
5	Sweden	4	0	4	0

== Playoffs ==
=== 13th to 18th place ===
Quarter-finals 13-18
Singapore	0
Sweden	3
Chinese Taipei	0
Japan	3

Semi-finals 13-16
Ireland	1
Sweden	2
South Korea	0
Japan	2
Play-off 17/18
Singapore	2
Chinese Taipei	0

Play-off 13/14
Sweden	0
Japan	2
Play-off 15/16
Ireland	1
South Korea	2

=== 9th to 12th place ===
Date	Matches		
8 Aug	France	1–2	South Africa
8 Aug	Canada	2–1	New Zealand
8 Aug	France	3–0	New Zealand
8 Aug	Canada	3–0	South Africa
9 Aug	France	1–2	Canada
9 Aug	New Zealand	2–0	South Africa

Rank	Nation	Match	Win	Lost	Points
9	Canada	3	3	0	6
10	New Zealand	3	2	1	4
11	South Africa	3	1	2	2
12	France	3	0	3	0

=== 1st to 8th place ===
Quarter-finals
1	Egypt	3
Australia	0
4	England	3
6	India	0
5	United States	0
3	Hong Kong	3
8	Switzerland	0
2	Malaysia	3

Semi-finals
1	Egypt	3
4	England	0
3	Hong Kong	0
2	Malaysia	2

Final
1	Egypt	2
2	Malaysia	0

5th to 8th place bracket

Semi-finals 5-8
Australia	0
6	India	2
5	United States	3
8	Switzerland	0

Playoff 5-6
6	India	2
5	United States	1
Playoff 7-8
Australia	0
8	Switzerland	2

==== Quarterfinals ====
Egypt
3
Quarter-final 1
Court 2
7 August 2019

Australia
0

			1	2	3	4	5
1	(Egypt) (Australia)	Hania El Hammamy; Alex Haydon	11; 7	11; 5	11; 9
2	(Egypt) (Australia)	Jana Shiha; Lee Sze Yu	11; 5	11; 6	11; 6
3	(Egypt) (Australia)	Farida Mohamed; Remashree Muniandy	11; 8	11; 3

England
3
Quarter-final 2
Court 3
7 August 2019

India
0

			1	2	3	4	5
1	(England) (India)	Elise Lazarus; Sanya Vats	8; 11	1; 11	11; 7	11; 6	11; 3
2	(England) (India)	Alice Green; Aishwarya Khubchandani	11; 13	11; 8	11; 8	11; 6
3	(England) (India)	Evie Coxon; Yoshna Singh	11; 7	8; 11	13; 11

United States
0
Quarter-final 3
Court 4
7 August 2019

Hong Kong
3

			1	2	3	4	5
1	(United States) (Hong Kong)	Marina Stefanoni; Chan Sin Yuk	7; 11	11; 7	1; 11	11; 7	4; 11
2	(United States) (Hong Kong)	Olivia Robinson; Kirstie Wong	4; 11	6; 11	9; 11
3	(United States) (Hong Kong)	Caroline Spahr; Lee Sum Yuet	11; 8	11; 13	6; 11

Switzerland
0
Quarter-final 4
Glass Court
7 August 2019

Malaysia
3

			1	2	3	4	5
1	(Switzerland) (Malaysia)	Ambre Allinckx; Aifa Azman	4; 11	11; 13	4; 11
2	(Switzerland) (Malaysia)	Cassandra Fitze; Chan Yiwen	3; 11	7; 11	4; 11
3	(Switzerland) (Malaysia)	Alina Poessl; Ainaa Ampandi	1; 11	5; 11

==== Semifinals ====
Egypt
3
Semi-final 1
Glass Court
8 August 2019

England
0

			1	2	3	4	5
1	(Egypt) (England)	Jana Shiha; Alice Green	11; 7	11; 4	11; 4
2	(Egypt) (England)	Hania El Hammamy; Elise Lazarus	11; 2	11; 5	11; 5
3	(Egypt) (England)	Farida Mohamed; Evie Coxon	11; 7	11; 5

Hong Kong
0
Semi-final 2
Glass Court
8 August 2019

Malaysia
2

			1	2	3	4	5
1	(Hong Kong) (Malaysia)	Kirstie Wong; Chan Yiwen	2; 11	3; 11	0; 11
2	(Hong Kong) (Malaysia)	Chan Sin Yuk; Aifa Azman	2; 11	11; 6	12; 14	15; 13	9; 11
3	(Hong Kong) (Malaysia)	Lee Sum Yuet; Ainaa Ampandi						not played

==== Final ====
Egypt
2
Final
Glass Court
9 August 2019

Malaysia
0

			1	2	3	4	5
1	(Egypt) (Malaysia)	Hania El Hammamy; Aifa Azman	6; 11	11; 6	11; 9	11; 3
2	(Egypt) (Malaysia)	Farida Mohamed; Ainaa Ampandi	11; 9	8; 11	4; 11	11; 9	11; 4
3	(Egypt) (Malaysia)	Jana Shiha; Chan Yiwen						not played

== Final standing ==
Rank	Team
1	Egypt
2	Malaysia
3	England
3	Hong Kong
5	India
6	United States
7	Switzerland
8	Australia
9	Canada
10	New Zealand
11	South Africa
12	France
13	Japan
14	Sweden
15	South Korea
16	Ireland
17	Singapore
18	Chinese Taipei

== See also ==
- 2019 Women's World Junior Squash Championships

Preceded by New Zealand (Tauranga); 2017	Squash World Junior Team; Malaysia (Kuala Lumpur); 2019	Succeeded by 2021
