= 2008 Women's World Team Squash Championships =

Women's World Team 2008
- 16th WSF World Women's Team Championship
- Location: Cairo, Egypt
- Date: November 30 - December 6, 2008
- Teams: 19 (from all the 5 confederations)
- Website www.squashsite.co.uk/wwteams08.htm

Results
- Champions: Egypt
- Runners-up: England
- Third place: Malaysia

The 2008 Women's World Team Squash Championships was the women's edition of the 2008 World Team Squash Championships organized by the World Squash Federation, which serves as the world team championship for squash players. The event was held in Cairo, Egypt from November 30 to December 6, 2008. The tournament was organized by the World Squash Federation and the Egyptian Squash Association. The Egypt team won their first World Team Championships, beating the English team in the final.

== Participating teams ==
A total of 19 teams competed from all the five confederations: Africa, America, Asia, Europe and Oceania. For China, it was their first participation at a world team championship.

Africa (SFA)	America (FPS)	Asia (ASF)	Europe (ESF)	Oceania (OSF)	Map
Egypt (Host Country); South Africa	Canada; United States	China; Hong Kong; Japan; Malaysia	Austria; England (Title Holder); France; Germany; Ireland; Italy; Netherlands; Spain; Switzerland	Australia; New Zealand	Map of the participating nations

== Seeds ==
1. England (final)
2. Egypt (champion)
3. New Zealand (semifinals)
4. Malaysia (semifinals)
5. Netherlands (quarterfinals)
6. (Republic of Ireland) Ireland (quarterfinals)
7. Australia (quarterfinals)
8. France (first round)

== Squads ==
England

- Jenny Duncalf
- Alison Waters
- Laura Lengthorn-Massaro
- Tania Bailey

France

- Camille Serme
- Célia Allamargot
- Maud Duplomb
- Coline Aumard

Hong Kong

- Annie Au
- Joey Chan
- Leung Shin Nga
- Liu Tsz Ling

Spain

- Elisabet Sadó Garriga
- Xisela Aranda Núñez
- Stela Carbonell
- Alicia Alvarez Riaza

Austria

- Birgit Coufal
- Pamela Pancis
- Sandra Polak
- Judith Gradnitzer

Egypt

- Omneya Abdel Kawy
- Engy Kheirallah
- Raneem El Weleily
- Heba El Torky

Australia

- Kasey Brown
- Donna Urquhart
- Lisa Camilleri
- Amelia Pittock

Canada

- Alana Miller
- Runa Reta
- Tara Mullins
- Carolyn Russell

Japan

- Chinatsu Matsui
- Misaki Kobayashi
- Kozue Onizawa
- Yuki Omiya

Switzerland

- Gaby Schmohl
- Sara Guebey
- Jasmin Ballman
- Andrea Lanfranconi

New Zealand

- Shelley Kitchen
- Jaclyn Hawkes
- Louise Crome
- Joelle King

(Republic of Ireland) Ireland

- Madeline Perry
- Aisling Blake
- Laura Mylotte
- Tania Owens

United States

- Natalie Grainger
- Claire Rein-Weston
- Olivia Blatchford
- Hope Prockop

Italy

- Manuela Manetta
- Sonia Pasteris
- Chiara Ferrari
- Veronica Favero Camp

China

- Wu Zhznzhen
- Jiang Li
- Xiu Chen
- Ou Wei

Malaysia

- Nicol David
- Sharon Wee
- Delia Arnold
- Low Wee Wern

Netherlands

- Vanessa Atkinson
- Annelize Naudé
- Orla Noom
- Dagmar Vermeulen

Germany

- Kathrin Rohrmueller
- Pamela Hathway
- Sina Wall
- Not Used

South Africa

- Farrah Sterne
- Diana Argyle
- Siyoli Lusaseni
- Milnay Louw

== Group stage results ==
=== Pool A ===
England	3	-	0	Hong Kong
France	3	-	0	Austria

England	3	-	0	Spain
Hong Kong	3	-	0	Austria
France	3	-	0	Spain
England	3	-	0	Austria

Hong Kong	2	-	1	Spain
England	3	-	0	France
Spain	3	-	0	Austria
France	0	-	3	Hong Kong

Rank	Nation	Match	Win	Low	Points
1	England	4	4	0	8
2	Hong Kong	4	3	1	6
3	France	4	2	2	4
4	Spain	4	1	3	2
5	Austria	4	0	4	0

=== Pool B ===
Egypt	2	-	1	Canada
Australia	3	-	0	Switzerland
Egypt	3	-	0	Japan
Canada	3	-	0	Switzerland

Australia	3	-	0	Japan
Egypt	3	-	0	Switzerland
Australia	2	-	1	Canada
Japan	3	-	0	Switzerland

Canada	3	-	0	Japan
Egypt	3	-	0	Australia

Rank	Nation	Match	Win	Low	Points
1	Egypt	4	4	0	8
2	Australia	4	3	1	6
3	Canada	4	2	2	4
4	Japan	4	1	3	2
5	Switzerland	4	0	4	0

=== Pool C ===
New Zealand	2	-	1	United States
(Republic of Ireland) Ireland	3	-	0	China
New Zealand	3	-	0	Italy
United States	3	-	0	China

(Republic of Ireland) Ireland	3	-	0	Italy
New Zealand	3	-	0	China
(Republic of Ireland) Ireland	3	-	0	United States

Italy	3	-	0	China
New Zealand	3	-	0	(Republic of Ireland) Ireland
United States	2	-	1	Italy

Rank	Nation	Match	Win	Low	Points
1	New Zealand	4	4	0	8
2	(Republic of Ireland) Ireland	4	3	1	6
3	United States	4	2	2	4
4	Italy	4	1	3	2
5	China	4	0	4	0

=== Pool D ===
Malaysia	3	-	0	South Africa
Netherlands	3	-	0	Germany

Malaysia	3	-	0	Germany
Netherlands	2	-	1	South Africa

Malaysia	3	-	0	Netherlands
Germany	0	-	3	South Africa

Rank	Nation	Match	Win	Low	Points
1	Malaysia	3	3	0	6
2	Netherlands	3	2	1	4
3	South Africa	3	1	2	2
4	Germany	3	0	3	0

== Finals ==
=== Draw ===
Quarterfinals
1	England	3	3	2
6	(Republic of Ireland) Ireland	0	1	0
3	New Zealand	3	3	2
9	Hong Kong	0	1	0
7	Australia	2	1	2
4	Malaysia	3	3	0
5	Netherlands	0	1	0
2	Egypt	3	3	2

Semifinals
1	England	3	3	2
3	New Zealand	1	0	0
4	Malaysia	1	3	1
2	Egypt	3	0	3

Final
1	England	0	3	2
2	Egypt	3	2	3
Third place match
3	New Zealand	1	3	0
4	Malaysia	3	1	3

=== Results ===
==== Quarter-finals ====
England
3
QUARTER FINAL
Cairo, Egypt
4 December 2008
Glass Court

Ireland
0

			1	2	3	4	5
1	(England) (Republic of Ireland)	N°3 Laura Lengthorn-Massaro; N°3 Tania Owens	11; 3	11; 4	11; 5
2	(England) (Republic of Ireland)	N°1 Jenny Duncalf; N°1 Madeline Perry	9; 11	11; 5	11; 9	12; 10
3	(England) (Republic of Ireland)	N°2 Alison Waters; N°2 Aisling Blake	11; 6	11; 4

New Zealand
3
QUARTER FINAL
Cairo, Egypt
4 December 2008
Glass Court

Hong Kong
0

			1	2	3	4	5
1	(New Zealand) (Hong Kong)	N°3 Joelle King; N°3 Liu Tsz Ling	11; 2	11; 4	11; 3
2	(New Zealand) (Hong Kong)	N°1 Shelley Kitchen; N°1 Annie Au	11; 7	9; 11	11; 4	11; 5
3	(New Zealand) (Hong Kong)	N°2 Jaclyn Hawkes; N°2 Joey Chan	11; 5	11; 2

Australia
1
QUARTER FINAL
Cairo, Egypt
4 December 2008
Glass Court

Malaysia
2

			1	2	3	4	5
1	(Australia) (Malaysia)	N°3 Lisa Camilleri; N°3 Delia Arnold	6; 11	7; 11	11; 9	11; 8	2; 11
2	(Australia) (Malaysia)	N°1 Kasey Brown; N°1 Nicol David	2; 11	11; 8	1; 11	7; 11
3	(Australia) (Malaysia)	N°2 Donna Urquhart; N°2 Sharon Wee	11; 4	11; 7

Netherlands
0
QUARTER FINAL
Cairo, Egypt
4 December 2008
Glass Court

Egypt
3

			1	2	3	4	5
1	(Netherlands) (Egypt)	N°3 Orla Noom; N°3 Raneem El Weleily	8; 11	2; 11	8; 11
2	(Netherlands) (Egypt)	N°1 Vanessa Atkinson; N°1 Omneya Abdel Kawy	8; 11	10; 12	11; 6	7; 11
3	(Netherlands) (Egypt)	N°2 Annelize Naudé; N°2 Engy Kheirallah	11; 13	6; 11

==== Semi-finals ====
England
3
SEMI FINAL
Cairo, Egypt
5 December 2008
Glass Court

New Zealand
0

			1	2	3	4	5
1	(England) (New Zealand)	N°2 Alison Waters; N°2 Jaclyn Hawkes	11; 6	11; 7	8; 11	11; 5
2	(England) (New Zealand)	N°1 Jenny Duncalf; N°1 Shelley Kitchen	11; 7	11; 5	12; 10
3	(England) (New Zealand)	N°3 Laura Lengthorn-Massaro; N°3 Joelle King	11; 8	11; 8

Malaysia
1
SEMI FINAL
Cairo, Egypt
5 December 2008
Glass Court

Egypt
2

			1	2	3	4	5
1	(Malaysia) (Egypt)	N°2 Sharon Wee; N°2 Engy Kheirallah	6; 11	6; 11	11; 9	9; 11
2	(Malaysia) (Egypt)	N°1 Nicol David; N°1 Omneya Abdel Kawy	16; 14	11; 4	11; 8
3	(Malaysia) (Egypt)	N°3 Delia Arnold; N°3 Raneem El Weleily	3; 11	6; 11	12; 10	9; 11

==== Final ====
England
1
FINAL
Cairo, Egypt
6 December 2008
Glass Court

Egypt
2

			1	2	3	4	5
1	(England) (Egypt)	N°1 Jenny Duncalf; N°1 Omneya Abdel Kawy	1; 11	6; 11	9; 11
2	(England) (Egypt)	N°3 Laura Lengthorn-Massaro; N°3 Raneem El Weleily	11; 8	5; 11	15; 13	10; 11	11; 4
3	(England) (Egypt)	N°2 Alison Waters; N°2 Engy Kheirallah	11; 4	9; 11	11; 9	0; 11	10; 12

2008 WSF World Team Championship

Egypt
1st title

Team
Omneya Abdel Kawy - Engy Kheirallah - Raneem El Weleily - Heba El Torky

== Post-tournament team ranking ==
Position	Team	Result
1st	Egypt	Champions
2nd	England	Final
3rd	Malaysia	Semi-final
4th	New Zealand	Semi-final
5th	(Republic of Ireland) Ireland	Quarter-final
6th	Australia	Quarter-final
7th	Netherlands	Quarter-final
8th	Hong Kong	Quarter-final

Position	Team	Result
9th	South Africa	Group Stage
10th	Canada	Group Stage
11th	France	Group Stage
12th	Japan	Group Stage
13th	Germany	Group Stage
14th	United States	Group Stage
15th	Italy	Group Stage
16th	Spain	Group Stage

Position	Team	Result
17th	Switzerland	Group Stage
18th	Austria	Group Stage
19th	China	Group Stage

== See also ==
- World Team Squash Championships

Preceded by Canada (Edmonton); 2006	Squash World Team; Egypt (Cairo); 2008	Succeeded by New Zealand (Palmerston North) 2010
