= 2006 Women's World Team Squash Championships =

Squash competition

Women's World Team 2006
- 15th WSF World Women's Team Championship
- Location: Edmonton, Alberta, Canada
- Date: September 24–30, 2006
- Teams: 16 (from all the 5 confederations)
- Website squash.ca/2006womensworlds

Results
- Champions: England
- Runners-up: Egypt
- Third place: Malaysia

The 2006 Women's World Team Squash Championships was the women's edition of the 2006 World Team Squash Championships organized by the World Squash Federation, which serves as the world team championship for squash players. The event was held at the Royal Glenora Club in Edmonton, Alberta, Canada from September 24 to 30, 2006. The tournament was organized by the World Squash Federation and Squash Canada. The England team won their sixth World Team Championships, beating the Egyptian team in the final.

== Participating teams ==
A total of 16 teams competed from all the five confederations: Africa, America, Asia, Europe and Oceania.

Africa (SFA)	America (FPS)	Asia (ASF)	Europe (ESF)	Oceania (OSF)	Map
Egypt; South Africa	Canada (Host Country); United States	Hong Kong; Japan; Malaysia	Austria; England; France; Germany; Ireland; Netherlands; Spain	Australia (Title Holder); New Zealand	Map of the participating nations

== Seeds ==
1. England (champion)
2. Egypt (final)
3. Malaysia (semifinals)
4. Netherlands (semifinals)
5. Australia (quarterfinals)
6. New Zealand (quarterfinals)
7. Canada (first round)
8. Hong Kong (first round)

== Squads ==
England

- Tania Bailey
- Vicky Botwright
- Jenny Duncalf
- Alison Waters

Hong Kong

- Rebecca Chiu
- Christina Mak
- Annie Au
- Joey Chan

(Republic of Ireland) Ireland

- Aisling Blake
- Laura Mylotte
- Eleanor Lapthorne
- Madeline Perry

Austria

- Pamela Pancis
- Birgit Coufal
- Ines Gradnitzer
- Konny Hofer

Egypt

- Omneya Abdel Kawy
- Engy Kheirallah
- Raneem El Weleily
- Amnah El Trabolsy

Canada

- Runa Reta
- Melanie Jans
- Carolyn Russell
- Alana Miller

France

- Isabelle Stoehr
- Camille Serme
- Soraya Renai
- Célia Allamargot

Spain

- Elisabet Sado
- Margaux Moros-Pitarch
- Laura Alonso
- Chantal Moros-Pitarch

Malaysia

- Nicol David
- Sharon Wee
- Tricia Chuah
- Not Used

New Zealand

- Shelley Kitchen
- Jaclyn Hawkes
- Louise Crome
- Joelle King

United States

- Latasha Khan
- Meredeth Quick
- Louise Hall
- Ivy Pochoda

Japan

- Nami Nishio
- Chinatsu Matsui
- Sachiko Shinta
- Kozue Onizawa

Netherlands

- Vanessa Atkinson
- Annelize Naudé
- Margriet Huisman
- Orla Noom

Australia

- Kasey Brown
- Melissa Martin
- Amelia Pittock
- Dianne Desira

South Africa

- Tenille Swartz
- Claire Nitch
- Diana Argyle
- Janet van der Westhuizen

Germany

- Katharina Witt
- Kathrin Rohrmüller
- Carola Weiss
- Daniela Schumann

== Group stage results ==
=== Pool A ===
England	3	-	0	(Republic of Ireland) Ireland
Hong Kong	3	-	0	Austria
Hong Kong	0	-	3	England
Austria	0	-	3	(Republic of Ireland) Ireland
Austria	0	-	3	England
Hong Kong	1	-	2	(Republic of Ireland) Ireland

Rank	Nation	Match	Win	Low	Points
1	England	3	3	0	6
2	(Republic of Ireland) Ireland	3	2	1	4
3	Hong Kong	3	1	2	2
4	Austria	3	0	2	0

=== Pool B ===
Egypt	3	-	0	Spain
Canada	1	-	2	France
Canada	3	-	0	Spain
France	0	-	3	Egypt
Canada	1	-	2	Egypt
France	2	-	1	Spain

Rank	Nation	Match	Win	Low	Points
1	Egypt	3	3	0	6
2	France	3	2	1	4
3	Canada	3	1	2	2
4	Spain	3	0	3	0

=== Pool C ===
Malaysia	3	-	0	United States
New Zealand	3	-	0	Japan
New Zealand	1	-	2	Malaysia
Japan	1	-	2	United States
Japan	0	-	3	Malaysia
New Zealand	3	-	0	United States

Rank	Nation	Match	Win	Low	Points
1	Malaysia	3	3	0	6
2	New Zealand	3	2	1	4
3	United States	3	1	2	2
4	Japan	3	0	3	0

=== Pool D ===
Netherlands	2	-	1	Germany
South Africa	2	-	1	Australia
South Africa	0	-	3	Netherlands
Australia	3	-	0	Germany
Australia	0	-	3	Netherlands
South Africa	2	-	1	Germany

Rank	Nation	Match	Win	Low	Points
1	Netherlands	3	3	0	6
2	South Africa	3	2	1	4
3	Australia	3	1	2	2
4	Germany	3	0	3	0

== Finals ==
=== Draw ===
Quarterfinals
1	England	3	3	2
6	New Zealand	1	0	0
4	Netherlands	3	3	2
(Republic of Ireland) Ireland	1	0	0
France	0	0	0
3	Malaysia	3	3	2
South Africa	1	0	0
2	Egypt	3	3	2

Semifinals
1	England	3	3	2
4	Netherlands	0	2	0
3	Malaysia	3	0	0
2	Egypt	0	3	3

Final
1	England	3	3
2	Egypt	2	0

Note: The third match of the final was not played as the result was clarified.

Third place match
4	Netherlands	3	0	0
3	Malaysia	0	3	3

=== Results ===
==== Quarter-finals ====
England
3
QUARTER FINAL
Edmonton, Alberta, Canada
28 September 2006
Glass Court

New Zealand
0

			1	2	3	4	5
1	(England) (New Zealand)	N°1 Tania Bailey; N°1 Shelley Kitchen	6; 9	9; 7	9; 4	9; 2
2	(England) (New Zealand)	N°2 Vicky Botwright; N°2 Jaclyn Hawkes	9; 2	9; 4
3	(England) (New Zealand)	N°3 Jenny Duncalf; N°3 Louise Crome	9; 0	9; 0

Netherlands
3
QUARTER FINAL
Edmonton, Alberta, Canada
28 September 2006
Glass Court

Ireland
0

			1	2	3	4	5
1	(Netherlands) (Republic of Ireland)	N°1 Vanessa Atkinson; N°1 Aisling Blake	9; 1	8; 10	9; 0	9; 0
2	(Netherlands) (Republic of Ireland)	N°2 Annelize Naude; N°2 Laura Mylotte	9; 5	9; 1	9; 7
3	(Netherlands) (Republic of Ireland)	N°3 Orla Noom; N°3 Eleanor Lapthorne	9; 6	9; 3

France
0
QUARTER FINAL
Edmonton, Alberta, Canada
28 September 2006
Glass Court

Malaysia
3

			1	2	3	4	5
1	(France) (Malaysia)	N°1 Camille Serme; N°1 Nicol David	3; 9	1; 9	1; 9
2	(France) (Malaysia)	N°2 Célia Allamargot; N°2 Sharon Wee	1; 9	2; 9	0; 9
3	(France) (Malaysia)	N°3 Soraya Renai; N°3 Tricia Chuah	6; 9	0; 9

South Africa
0
QUARTER FINAL
Edmonton, Alberta, Canada
28 September 2006
Glass Court

Egypt
3

			1	2	3	4	5
1	(South Africa) (Egypt)	N°1 Tenille Swartz; N°1 Omneya Abdel Kawy	9; 7	8; 10	4; 9	0; 9
2	(South Africa) (Egypt)	N°1 Diana Argyle; N°2 Engy Kheirallah	1; 9	3; 9	1; 9
3	(South Africa) (Egypt)	N°1 Janet van der Westhuizen; N°3 Raneem El Weleily	4; 9	4; 9

==== Semi-finals ====
England
3
SEMI FINAL
Edmonton, Alberta, Canada
29 September 2006
Glass Court

Netherlands
0

			1	2	3	4	5
1	(England) (Netherlands)	N°2 Vicky Botwright; N°2 Annelize Naude	10; 8	9; 2	9; 4
2	(England) (Netherlands)	N°1 Tania Bailey; N°1 Vanessa Atkinson	7; 9	9; 2	9; 0	9; 10	9; 3
3	(England) (Netherlands)	N°3 Alison Waters; N°3 Orla Noom	9; 2	9; 3

Malaysia
1
SEMI FINAL
Edmonton, Alberta, Canada
29 September 2006
Glass Court

Egypt
2

			1	2	3	4	5
1	(Malaysia) (Egypt)	N°2 Sharon Wee; N°2 Engy Kheirallah	0; 9	5; 9	0; 9
2	(Malaysia) (Egypt)	N°1 Nicol David; N°1 Omneya Abdel Kawy	9; 8	9; 0	9; 0
3	(Malaysia) (Egypt)	N°3 Tricia Chuah; N°3 Raneem El Weleily	7; 9	2; 9	8; 10

==== Final ====
England
2
FINAL
Edmonton, Alberta, Canada
30 September 2006
Glass Court

Egypt
0

			1	2	3	4	5
1	(England) (Egypt)	N°2 Vicky Botwright; N°2 Engy Kheirallah	9; 3	8; 10	4; 9	9; 7	9; 2
2	(England) (Egypt)	N°1 Tania Bailey; N°1 Omneya Abdel Kawy	9; 2	9; 2	2; 0
3	(England) (Egypt)	N°3 Jenny Duncalf; N°3 Raneem El Weleily

2006 WSF World Team Championship

England
6th title

Team
Tania Bailey - Vicky Botwright - Jenny Duncalf - Alison Waters

== Post-tournament team ranking ==
Position	Team	Result
1st	England	Champions
2nd	Egypt	Final
3rd	Malaysia	Semi-final
4th	Netherlands	Semi-final
5th	New Zealand	Quarter-final
6th	South Africa	Quarter-final
7th	(Republic of Ireland) Ireland	Quarter-final
8th	France	Quarter-final

Position	Team	Result
9th	Hong Kong	Group Stage
10th	Australia	Group Stage
11th	United States	Group Stage
12th	Germany	Group Stage
13th	Canada	Group Stage
14th	Japan	Group Stage
15th	Spain	Group Stage
16th	Austria	Group Stage

== See also ==
- World Team Squash Championships

Preceded by Netherlands (Amsterdam); 2004	Squash World Team; Canada (Edmonton); 2006	Succeeded by Egypt (Cairo); 2008
