= Canada national squash team =

Canada national squash team may refer to:

- Canada men's national squash team
- Canada women's national squash team
