= 2014 Women's World Team Squash Championships =

Women's World Team 2014
- 19th WSF World Women's Team Championship
- Location: Niagara-on-the-Lake, Canada
- Date(s): December 1–6, 2014
- Teams: 20 (from all the 5 confederations)
- Championship Director: Danny Da Costa
- Website www.wsfwomensteams.com

Results
- Champions: England
- Runners-up: Malaysia
- Third place: Egypt

The 2014 Women's World Team Squash Championships was the women's edition of the 2014 World Team Squash Championships, which is the world team championship for squash players. The event was held in Niagara-on-the-Lake, Canada, from December 1 to 6, 2014. The tournament was organized by the World Squash Federation and Squash Canada. The England team won its seventh World Team Championships, beating the Malaysian team in the final.

== Participating teams ==
20 teams competed in the world championships from all five confederations: Africa, America, Asia, Europe and Oceania. It was Guatemala's first participation in a world team championship.

Africa (SFA)	America (FPS)	Asia (ASF)	Europe (ESF)	Oceania (OSF)	Map
Egypt (Title holder); South Africa	Canada (Host country); Colombia; Guatemala; Mexico; United States	China; Hong Kong; India; Malaysia	Austria; England; France; Germany; Ireland; Spain; Wales	Australia; New Zealand	Map of the participating nations

== Seeds ==
1. Egypt (semi-finals)
2. England (champion)
3. Malaysia (final)
4. Hong Kong (semi-finals)
5. France (quarter-finals)
6. United States (quarter-finals)
7. Australia (quarter-finals)
8. (Republic of Ireland) Ireland (quarter-finals)
9. New Zealand (first round)
10. Wales (first round)
11. Canada (first round)
12. South Africa (first round)

== Squads ==
Egypt

- Raneem El Weleily
- Nour El Sherbini
- Nour El Tayeb
- Omneya Abdel Kawy

(Republic of Ireland) Ireland

- Madeline Perry
- Aisling Blake
- Laura Mylotte
- Breanne Flynn

New Zealand

- Amanda Landers-Murphy
- Megan Craig
- Kylie Lindsay
- Rebecca Barnett

Colombia

- Catalina Peláez
- Laura Tovar
- Anna Porras
- Karol González

China

- Li Dongjin
- Gu Jinyue
- Xiu Chen
- Duan Siyu

England

- Laura Massaro
- Alison Waters
- Sarah-Jane Perry
- Emma Beddoes

Australia

- Rachael Grinham
- Lisa Camilleri
- Sarah Cardwell
- Christine Nunn

Wales

- Tesni Evans
- Deon Saffery
- Jenny Haley
- Elin Harlow

Germany

- Sina Wall
- Franziska Hennes
- Annika Wiese
- Nicole Fries

Spain

- Xisela Aranda Núñez
- Cristina Gómez
- Marina De Juan Gallach
- Margaux Moros

Malaysia

- Nicol David
- Low Wee Wern
- Delia Arnold
- Zulhijjah Binti Azan

United States

- Amanda Sobhy
- Olivia Blatchford
- Natalie Grainger
- Sabrina Sobhy

Canada

- Samantha Cornett
- Danielle Letourneau
- Nikki Todd
- Hollie Naughton

Mexico

- Samantha Terán
- Diana García
- Nayelly Hernández
- Karla Urrutia

Guatemala

- Winifer Bonilla
- Pamela Anckermann
- Nicolle Anckermann
- Irena Barillas

Hong Kong

- Annie Au
- Joey Chan
- Liu Tsz-Ling
- Tong Tsz-Wing

France

- Camille Serme
- Coline Aumard
- Laura Pomportes
- Cyrielle Peltier

South Africa

- Siyoli Waters
- Milnay Louw
- Cheyna Tucker
- Alexandra Fuller

India

- Joshna Chinappa
- Anaka Alankamony
- Sachika Ingale
- Harshit Kaur Jawanda

Austria

- Birgit Coufal
- Jacqueline Peychär
- Anja Kaserer
- Lisa Kaserer

== Group stage ==
=== Pool A ===
December 1, 2014

Egypt	3	-	0	New Zealand
(Republic of Ireland) Ireland	3	-	0	China

December 2, 2014

Egypt	3	-	0	Colombia
New Zealand	3	-	0	China
(Republic of Ireland) Ireland	2	-	1	Colombia
Egypt	3	-	0	China

December 3, 2014

(Republic of Ireland) Ireland	2	-	1	New Zealand
Colombia	3	-	0	China
Egypt	3	-	0	(Republic of Ireland) Ireland
New Zealand	3	-	0	Colombia

Rank	Nation	Match	Win	Low	Points
1	Egypt	4	4	0	8
2	(Republic of Ireland) Ireland	4	3	1	6
3	New Zealand	4	2	2	4
4	Colombia	4	1	3	2
5	China	4	0	4	0

=== Pool B ===
December 1, 2014

England	2	-	1	Wales
Australia	3	-	0	Spain
England	3	-	0	Germany
Wales	3	-	0	Spain

December 2, 2014

Australia	3	-	0	Germany
England	3	-	0	Spain
Australia	3	-	0	Wales
Germany	3	-	0	Spain

December 3, 2014

England	3	-	0	Australia
Wales	2	-	1	Germany

Rank	Nation	Match	Win	Low	Points
1	England	4	4	0	8
2	Australia	4	3	1	6
3	Wales	4	2	2	4
4	Germany	4	1	3	2
5	Spain	4	0	4	0

=== Pool C ===
December 1, 2014

Malaysia	3	-	0	Canada
United States	3	-	0	Guatemala
Malaysia	3	-	0	Mexico
Canada	3	-	0	Guatemala

December 2, 2014

United States	3	-	0	Mexico
Malaysia	3	-	0	Guatemala
United States	3	-	0	Canada
Mexico	3	-	0	Guatemala

December 3, 2014

Malaysia	3	-	0	United States
Canada	3	-	0	Mexico

Rank	Nation	Match	Win	Low	Points
1	Malaysia	4	4	0	8
2	United States	4	3	1	6
3	Canada	4	2	2	4
4	Mexico	4	1	3	2
5	Guatemala	4	0	4	0

=== Pool D ===
December 1, 2014

Hong Kong	3	-	0	South Africa
France	3	-	0	Austria
Hong Kong	3	-	0	India
South Africa	3	-	0	Austria

December 2, 2014

France	3	-	0	India
Hong Kong	3	-	0	Austria

December 3, 2014

France	3	-	0	South Africa
India	3	-	0	Austria
Hong Kong	2	-	1	France
South Africa	2	-	1	India

Rank	Nation	Match	Win	Low	Points
1	Hong Kong	4	4	0	8
2	France	4	3	1	6
3	South Africa	4	2	2	4
4	India	4	1	3	2
5	Austria	4	0	4	0

== Finals ==
=== Draw ===
Quarter-finals
1	Egypt	3	3	3
7	Australia	0	1	0
5	France	0	0
3	Malaysia	3	3
4	Hong Kong	3	3	0
6	United States	0	0	2
8	(Republic of Ireland) Ireland	1	0	0
2	England	3	3	2

Semi-finals
1	Egypt	1	2
3	Malaysia	3	3
4	Hong Kong	0	3	1
2	England	3	1	3

Final
3	Malaysia	0	3	1
2	England	3	0	3
Third place match
1	Egypt	3	3
4	Hong Kong	0	0

=== Results ===
==== Quarter-finals ====
Egypt
3
Quarter-final
Niagara-on-the-Lake, Canada
4 December 2014
Glass Court

Australia
0

			1	2	3	4	5
1	(Egypt) (Australia)	N°2 Nour El Sherbini; N°2 Lisa Camilleri	11; 2	11; 5	11; 7
2	(Egypt) (Australia)	N°1 Raneem El Weleily; N°1 Rachael Grinham	12; 10	13; 11	4; 11	11; 3
3	(Egypt) (Australia)	N°3 Nour El Tayeb; N°3 Sarah Cardwell	11; 4	11; 6

France
0
Quarter-final
Niagara-on-the-Lake, Canada
4 December 2014
Glass Court

Malaysia
2

			1	2	3	4	5
1	(France) (Malaysia)	N°2 Coline Aumard; N°2 Low Wee Wern	4; 11	8; 11	9; 11
2	(France) (Malaysia)	N°1 Camille Serme; N°1 Nicol David	6; 11	9; 11	11; 13
3	(France) (Malaysia)	N°3 Laura Pomportes; N°3 Delia Arnold

Hong Kong
2
Quarter-final
Niagara-on-the-Lake, Canada
4 December 2014
Court N°6

United States
1

			1	2	3	4	5
1	(Hong Kong) (United States)	N°2 Joey Chan; N°2 Olivia Blatchford	11; 6	11; 2	11; 7
2	(Hong Kong) (United States)	N°1 Annie Au; N°1 Amanda Sobhy	14; 12	11; 6	11; 2
3	(Hong Kong) (United States)	N°3 Tong Tsz-Wing; N°3 Natalie Grainger	8; 11	5; 11

Ireland
0
Quarter-final
Niagara-on-the-Lake, Canada
4 December 2014
Glass Court

England
3

			1	2	3	4	5
1	(Republic of Ireland) (England)	N°2 Aisling Blake; N°2 Alison Waters	11; 8	8; 11	5; 11	4; 11
2	(Republic of Ireland) (England)	N°1 Madeline Perry; N°1 Laura Massaro	3; 11	6; 11	8; 11
3	(Republic of Ireland) (England)	N°3 Breanne Flynn; N°3 Emma Beddoes	5; 11	5; 11

==== Semi-finals ====
Egypt
0
Semi-final
Niagara-on-the-Lake, Canada
5 December 2014
Glass Court

Malaysia
2

			1	2	3	4	5
1	(Egypt) (Malaysia)	N°1 Raneem El Weleily; N°1 Nicol David	3; 11	11; 8	7; 11	9; 11
2	(Egypt) (Malaysia)	N°2 Nour El Sherbini; N°2 Low Wee Wern	9; 11	11; 8	2; 11	11; 7	9; 11
3	(Egypt) (Malaysia)	N°3 Omneya Abdel Kawy; N°3 Delia Arnold

Hong Kong
1
Semi-final
Niagara-on-the-Lake, Canada
5 December 2014
Glass Court

England
2

			1	2	3	4	5
1	(Hong Kong) (England)	N°1 Annie Au; N°1 Laura Massaro	7; 11	11; 13	4; 11
2	(Hong Kong) (England)	N°2 Joey Chan; N°2 Alison Waters	11; 4	8; 11	11; 9	11; 3
3	(Hong Kong) (England)	N°3 Tong Tsz-Wing; N°3 Sarah-Jane Perry	12; 10	5; 11	3; 11	8; 11

==== Final ====
Malaysia
1
Final
Niagara-on-the-Lake, Canada
6 December 2014
Glass Court

England
2

			1	2	3	4	5
1	(Malaysia) (England)	N°3 Delia Arnold; N°3 Sarah-Jane Perry	8; 11	9; 11	7; 11
2	(Malaysia) (England)	N°1 Nicol David; N°1 Laura Massaro	11; 8	11; 9	11; 3
3	(Malaysia) (England)	N°2 Low Wee Wern; N°2 Alison Waters	8; 11	7; 11	11; 8	4; 11

2014 WSF World Team Championship

England
7th title

Team
Laura Massaro - Alison Waters - Sarah-Jane Perry - Emma Beddoes

== Post-tournament team ranking ==
Position	Team	Result
1st	England	Champions
2nd	Malaysia	Final
3rd	Egypt	Semi-final
4th	Hong Kong	Semi-final
5th	United States	Quarter-final
6th	France	Quarter-final
7th	Australia	Quarter-final
8th	(Republic of Ireland) Ireland	Quarter-final

Position	Team	Result
9th	Wales	Round of 16
10th	New Zealand	Round of 16
11th	Canada	Round of 16
12th	South Africa	Round of 16
13th	Mexico	Round of 16
14th	India	Round of 16
15th	Germany	Round of 16
16th	Colombia	Round of 16

Position	Team	Result
17th	Spain	Group stage
18th	China	Group stage
19th	Austria	Group stage
20th	Guatemala	Group stage

== See also ==
- World Team Squash Championships
- 2014 Women's World Open Squash Championship

Preceded by France (Nîmes); 2012	Squash World Team; Canada (Niagara-on-the-Lake); 2014	Succeeded by France (Paris); 2016
