= 2024 Women's World Team Squash Championships =

Squash tournament

2024 Women's World Team Championships
- 23rd WSF World Women's Team Championship
- Location: Hong Kong
- Venue: Hong Kong Football Club
- Date: 9 – 15 December
- Teams: 23
- Website wsfworldteams.com/en

Results
- Champions: Egypt
- Runners-up: United States
- Third place: Belgium; Malaysia

The 2024 Women's World Squash Team Championships was the 23rd edition of the world team squash championships. The event was held at the Hong Kong Football Club from 9 to 15 December 2024. It was organised by Hong Kong Squash and sanctioned by World Squash Federation.

Egypt won their fourth consecutive title and sixth overall.

== Participating teams ==
A total of 23 teams competed from all five confederations.

- Australia
- Belgium
- Canada
- China
- Colombia
- Egypt
- England
- Finland
- France
- Germany
- Hong Kong
- India
- Ireland
- Italy
- Japan
- South Korea
- Macau
- Malaysia
- Scotland
- South Africa
- Spain
- Switzerland
- United States

== Results ==
=== Group stage ===
Group A

Pos	Team	P	W	L	Pts	Squad
1	Egypt	2	2	0	4	Nour El Sherbini, Hania El Hammamy, Rowan Elaraby, Amina Orfi
2	Japan	2	1	1	2	Satomi Watanabe, Akari Midorikawa, Mahiro Nishio, Erisa Sano Herring
3	Spain	2	0	2	0	Marta Dominguez, Cristina Gómez, Ona Blasco, Noa Romero Blazquez

Group B

Pos	Team	P	W	L	Pts	Squad
1	United States	3	3	0	6	Olivia Weaver, Caroline Fouts, Amanda Sobhy, Marina Stefanoni
2	Scotland	3	2	1	4	Georgia Adderley, Alison Thomson, Ellie Jones, Robyn McAlpine
3	Germany	3	1	2	2	Saskia Beinhard, Katerina Tycova, Maya Weishar, Aylin Guensav
4	China	3	0	2	0	Ziyi Liu, Jiahao Hu, Lu Chunjing, Yuning Zhang

Group C

Pos	Team	P	W	L	Pts	Squad
1	Belgium	3	3	0	6	Nele Coll, Tinne Gilis, Marie Van Riet, Chloe Crabbe
2	India	3	2	1	4	Anahat Singh, Akanksha Salunkhe, Nirupama Dubey, Anjali Semwal
3	Colombia	3	1	2	2	Lucía Bautista, Catalina Peláez, Laura Tovar, María Tovar
4	Italy	3	0	2	0	Cristina Tartarone, Monica Menegozzi, Flavia Miceli, Beatrice Filippi

Group D

Pos	Team	P	W	L	Pts	Squad
1	England	3	3	0	6	Sarah-Jane Perry, Jasmine Hutton, Lucy Turmel, Lucy Beecroft
2	Canada	3	2	1	4	Hollie Naughton, Nicole Bunyan, Nikki Todd, Niki Shemirani
3	Switzerland	3	1	2	2	Cindy Merlo, Nadia Pfister, Maja Maziuk, Stella Kaufmann
4	South Korea	3	0	2	0	Mingyeong Heo, Hwayeong Eum, Chae Won Song, Bo Ram Ryoo

Group E

Pos	Team	P	W	L	Pts	Squad
1	Malaysia	3	3	0	6	Sivasangari Subramaniam, Rachel Arnold, Aira Azman, Aifa Azman
2	France	3	2	1	4	Mélissa Alves, Marie Stephan, Énora Villard, Lauren Baltayan
3	Ireland	3	1	2	2	Hannah Craig, Breanne Flynn, Hannah Mcgugan, Ciara Moloney
4	Macau	3	0	2	0	Gigi Yeung, Wai Leng Yeung, Leng Lam Leong, Kwai Chi Liu

Group F

Pos	Team	P	W	L	Pts	Squad
1	Hong Kong	3	3	0	6	Ho Tze Lok, Chan Sin Yuk, Lee Ka Yi, Tong Tsz Wing
2	Australia	3	2	1	4	Jessica Turnbull, Alex Haydon, Sarah Cardwell, Madison Lyon
3	South Africa	3	1	2	2	Hayley Ward, Teagan Roux, Alexa Pienaar, Helena Coetzee
4	Finland	3	0	2	0	Emilia Soini, Emilia Korhonen, Riina Koskinen, Viivi Paksu

=== Second Round ===
Team 1	Team 2	Score
France	Canada	2–0
India	Australia	2–1
Hong Kong, China	Scotland	2–1
Malaysia	Japan	2–1
Egypt	bye	
Belgium	bye	
England	bye	
United States	bye	

=== Quarter-finals ===
Malaysia
2
Quarter-final 1
Hong Kong

England
0

			1	2	3	4	5
1	(Malaysia) (England)	Sivasangari Subramaniam; Sarah-Jane Perry	4; 11	11; 7	11; 8	11; 6
2	(Malaysia) (England)	Aira Azman; Lucy Beecroft	5; 11	13; 11	11; 7	11; 6
3	(Malaysia) (England)	Rachel Arnold; Jasmine Hutton						not played

Egypt
2
Quarter-final 2
Hong Kong

France
0

			1	2	3	4	5
1	(Egypt) (France)	Hania Hammamy; Melissa Alves	11; 4	11; 5	11; 7
2	(Egypt) (France)	Amina Orfi; Enora Villard	11; 6	11; 5	11; 2
3	(Egypt) (France)	Rowan Elaraby; Marie Stephan						not played

Belgium
2
Quarter-final 3
Hong Kong

Hong Kong
1

			1	2	3	4	5
1	(Belgium) (Hong Kong)	Nele Coll; Ho Tomato Tze-Lok	11; 2	11; 6	11; 6
2	(Belgium) (Hong Kong)	Tinne Gilis; Chan Sin Yuk	11; 4	11; 6	11; 6
3	(Belgium) (Hong Kong)	Chloe Crabbe; Tsz-Wing Tong	5; 11	3; 11	9; 11

India
0
Quarter-final 4
Hong Kong

United States
2

			1	2	3	4	5
1	(India) (United States)	Anahat Singh; Amanda Sobhy	10; 12	4; 11	3; 11
2	(India) (United States)	Nirupama Dubey; Caroline Fouts	1; 11	5; 11	4; 11
3	(India) (United States)	Akanksha Salunkhe; Marina Stefanoni						not played

=== Semi-finals ===
Egypt
3
Semi-final 1
Hong Kong

Belgium
0

			1	2	3	4	5
1	(Egypt) (Belgium)	Nour El Sherbini; Nele Coll	11; 4	11; 4	11; 6
2	(Egypt) (Belgium)	Hania Hammamy; Tinne Gilis	11; 6	10; 12	12; 10	13; 11
3	(Egypt) (Belgium)	Rowan Elaraby; Marie Van Riet	11; 3	11; 5

United States
2
Semi-final 2
Hong Kong

Malaysia
0

			1	2	3	4	5
1	(United States) (Malaysia)	Olivia Fiechter; Sivasangari Subramaniam	7; 11	9; 11	11; 5	11; 2	11; 2
2	(United States) (Malaysia)	Amanda Sobhy; Rachel Arnold	11; 9	7; 11	11; 9	5; 11	11; 8
3	(United States) (Malaysia)	Marina Stefanoni; Aira Azman						not played

=== Final ===
Egypt
2
Final
HKFC Glass court 2

United States
0

			1	2	3	4	5
1	(Egypt) (United States)	Nour El Sherbini; Olivia Fiechter	7; 11	11; 6	11; 7	11; 7
2	(Egypt) (United States)	Rowan Elaraby; Marina Stefanoni	11; 6	12; 10	6; 11	11; 9
3	(Egypt) (United States)	Hania Hammamy; Amanda Sobhy						not played

== Final rankings ==
Position	Team
1st place, gold medalist(s)	Egypt
2nd place, silver medalist(s)	United States
3rd place, bronze medalist(s)	Belgium
3rd place, bronze medalist(s)	Malaysia
5th	England
6th	Hong Kong
7th	India
8th	France
9th	Japan
10th	Canada

Source: WSF

== See also ==
- 2024 Men's World Team Squash Championships
