= Dagmar Vermeulen =

Dutch squash player

Personal information
- Born: Oosterbeek, Netherlands
- Years active: 2001-2014

Sport
- Country: Netherlands
- Retired: yes
- Racquet used: Wilson

women's singles
- Highest ranking: 70 (September 2007)
- Updated on 26 September 2019

Dagmar Vermeulen is a Dutch former female professional squash player. She achieved her highest PSA world ranking of 70 in September 2007. She was part of the Dutch squad which competed at the 2008 Women's World Team Squash Championships.
