= Soraya Renai =

French squash player (born 1987)

Personal information
- Born: 10 June 1987 (age 39) Paris, France

Sport
- Country: France
- Handedness: right-handed
- Turned pro: 2005
- Racquet used: Wilson

Women's singles
- Highest ranking: 64 (May 2006)

Soraya Renai (born 10 June 1987) is a former professional French female squash player.

== Squash career ==
She competed in the Women's World Team Squash Championships in 2004 and 2006. She achieved her highest singles career ranking of 64 in May 2006.
