= 2015 Women's World Junior Team Squash Championships =

Women's World Junior Team 2015
- 16th WSF Women's World Junior Team Championship
- Location: Eindhoven Netherlands
- Website www.wsfworldjuniors.com

Results
- Champion: Egypt
- Runner-up: United States
- Third place: England / Malaysia

The 2015 Women's World Junior Team Squash Championships was held in Eindhoven, Netherlands. The event took place from 31 July to 4 August 2015.

As in the previous edition of the championship (2013 Women's World Junior Team Squash Championships), the finalists were again from the United States and Egypt and Egypt were again crowned champion.

== Seeds ==
1. Egypt (Champion)
2. United States (Final)
3. England (Semifinals)
4. Hong Kong (Quarterfinals)
5. Malaysia (Semifinals)
6. New Zealand (Quarterfinals)
7. India (Quarterfinals)
8. Canada (Quarterfinals)

== Group stage results ==
=== Pool A ===
Egypt	3	-	0	Switzerland
Canada	3	-	0	South Africa

Egypt	3	-	0	South Africa
Canada	2	-	1	Switzerland

Egypt	3	-	0	Canada
Switzerland	3	-	0	South Africa

Rank	Nation	Match	Win	Low	Points
1	Egypt	3	3	0	6
2	Canada	3	2	1	4
3	Switzerland	2	1	2	2
4	South Africa	3	0	3	0

=== Pool B ===
United States	3	-	0	Australia
India	3	-	0	Finland

United States	3	-	0	Finland
India	2	-	1	Australia

United States	3	-	0	India
Australia	2	-	1	Finland

Rank	Nation	Match	Win	Low	Points
1	United States	3	3	0	6
2	India	3	2	1	4
3	Australia	3	1	2	2
4	Finland	3	0	3	0

=== Pool C ===
England	3	-	0	Belgium
New Zealand	2	-	1	France
England	3	-	0	France
New Zealand	3	-	0	Zimbabwe

England	3	-	0	Zimbabwe
France	2	-	1	Belgium
England	3	-	0	New Zealand
Belgium	3	-	0	Zimbabwe

New Zealand	2	-	1	Belgium
France	3	-	0	Zimbabwe

Rank	Nation	Match	Win	Low	Points
1	England	4	4	0	8
2	New Zealand	4	3	1	6
3	France	4	2	2	4
4	Belgium	4	1	3	2
5	Zimbabwe	4	0	4	0

=== Pool D ===
Hong Kong	3	-	0	Netherlands
Malaysia	3	-	0	Germany
Hong Kong	3	-	0	Germany
Malaysia	3	-	0	Guyana

Hong Kong	3	-	0	Guyana
Germany	3	-	0	Netherlands
Hong Kong	1	-	2	Malaysia
Netherlands	3	-	0	Guyana

Malaysia	3	-	0	Netherlands
Germany	3	-	0	Guyana

Rank	Nation	Match	Win	Low	Points
1	Malaysia	4	4	0	8
2	Hong Kong	4	3	1	6
3	Germany	4	2	2	4
4	Netherlands	4	1	3	2
5	Guyana	4	0	4	0

== Finals ==
=== Draw ===
Quarterfinals
1	Egypt	3	3
7	India	0	0
6	New Zealand	0	3	2
5	Malaysia	3	2	3
3	England	3	3
4	Hong Kong	0	0
8	Canada	0	0	0
2	United States	3	3	2

Semifinals
1	Egypt	3	3
5	Malaysia	0	0
3	England	0	0
2	United States	3	3

Final
1	Egypt	3	3
2	United States	1	1

=== Results ===
==== Semi-finals ====
Egypt
2
SEMI FINAL
Eindhoven, Netherlands
3 August 2015
Central Court

Malaysia
0

			1	2	3	4	5
1	(Egypt) (Malaysia)	N°2 Nouran Gohar; N°2 Andrea Jia	11; 0	11; 7	11; 4
2	(Egypt) (Malaysia)	N°1 Habiba Mohamed; N°1 Sivasangari Subramaniam	11; 6	11; 5	11; 6
3	(Egypt) (Malaysia)	N°3 Salma Hany Ibrahim; N°3 Zoe Foo

England
0
SEMI FINAL
Eindhoven, Netherlands
3 August 2015
Central Court

United States
2

			1	2	3	4	5
1	(England) (United States)	N°2 Amelia Henley; N°2 Reeham Sedky	4; 11	2; 11	5; 11
2	(England) (United States)	N°1 Georgina Kennedy; N°1 Sabrina Sobhy	5; 11	9; 11	8; 11
3	(England) (United States)	N°3 Lucy Beecroft; N°3 Kayley Leonard

==== Final ====
Egypt
2
FINAL
Eindhoven, Netherlands
4 August 2015
Central Court

United States
0

			1	2	3	4	5
1	(Egypt) (United States)	N°1 Habiba Mohamed; N°1 Sabrina Sobhy	11; 7	8; 11	11; 6	11; 1
2	(Egypt) (United States)	N°3 Salma Hany Ibrahim; N°3 Kayley Leonard	11; 7	11; 13	11; 8	11; 9
3	(Egypt) (United States)	N°2 Nouran Gohar; N°2 Reeham Sedky

== Post-tournament team ranking ==
Position	Team	Result
1st	Egypt	Champions
2nd	United States	Final
3rd	England	Semi-final
3rd	Malaysia	Semi-final
5th	Canada	Quarter-final
6th	New Zealand	Quarter-final
7th	Hong Kong	Quarter-final
8th	India	Quarter-final

Position	Team	Result
9th	Switzerland	Group Stage
10th	Australia	Group Stage
11th	France	Group Stage
12th	Germany	Group Stage
13th	Finland	Group Stage
14th	South Africa	Group Stage
15th	Belgium	Group Stage
16th	Netherlands	Group Stage

Position	Team	Result
17th	Guyana	Group Stage
18th	Zimbabwe	Group Stage

== See also ==
- 2015 Women's World Junior Squash Championships
- World Junior Squash Championships

Preceded by Poland (Wroclaw); 2013	Squash World Junior Team; Netherlands (Eindhoven); 2015	Succeeded by New Zealand (Tauranga); 2017
