= 2010 Women's World Team Squash Championships =

Women's World Team 2010
- 17th WSF World Women's Team Championship
- Location: Palmerston North, New Zealand
- Date: November 28 - December 4, 2010
- Teams: 16 (from all the 5 confederations)
- Website www.womensworldsquash2010.co.nz

Results
- Champions: Australia
- Runners-up: England
- Third place: Malaysia

The 2010 Women's World Team Squash Championships was the women's edition of the 2010 World Team Squash Championships organized by the World Squash Federation, which serves as the world team championship for squash players. The tournament was organized by the World Squash Federation and Squash New Zealand. The tournament was held in Palmerston North, New Zealand from November 28 to December 4, 2010. The Australia team won their ninth World Team Championships, beating the English team in the final.

== Participating teams ==
A total of 16 teams competed from all the five confederations: Africa, America, Asia, Europe, and Oceania. It was Mexico's first participation in a world team championship.

Africa (SFA)	America (FPS)	Asia (ASF)	Europe (ESF)	Oceania (OSF)	Map
Egypt (Title Holder); South Africa	Canada; Mexico; United States	Hong Kong; India; Japan; Malaysia	Austria; England; France; Ireland; Netherlands	Australia; New Zealand (Host Country)	Map of the participating nations

== Seeds ==
1. England (final)
2. Australia (champion)
3. Egypt (quarterfinals)
4. Malaysia (semifinals)
5. New Zealand (semifinals)
6. France (quarterfinals)
7. (Republic of Ireland) Ireland (quarterfinals)
8. Netherlands (first round)

== Squads ==
England

- Jenny Duncalf
- Laura Massaro
- Tania Bailey
- Sarah Kippax

Netherlands

- Vanessa Atkinson
- Annelize Naudé
- Orla Noom
- Milou van der Heijden

United States

- Natalie Grainger
- Latasha Khan
- Amanda Sobhy
- Olivia Blatchford

Austria

- Birgit Coufal
- Sandra Polak
- Judith Gradnitzer
- Sabrina Rehman

Australia

- Rachael Grinham
- Kasey Brown
- Sarah Fitz-Gerald
- Donna Urquhart

(Republic of Ireland) Ireland

- Madeline Perry
- Aisling Blake
- Laura Mylotte
- Zoe Barr

India

- Dipika Pallikal
- Joshna Chinappa
- Anaka Alankamony
- Anwesha Reddy

Japan

- Misaki Kobayashi
- Miwa Maekawa
- Yuki Sakai
- Not Used

Egypt

- Omneya Abdel Kawy
- Raneem El Weleily
- Engy Kheirallah
- Nour El Tayeb

France

- Camille Serme
- Isabelle Stoehr
- Coline Aumard
- Maud Duplomb

South Africa

- Tenille Swartz
- Siyoli Waters
- Milnay Louw
- Cheyna Tucker

Mexico

- Samantha Terán
- Graciela Lopez Perez
- Nayelly Hernández
- Imelda Salazar Martinez

New Zealand

- Jaclyn Hawkes
- Joelle King
- Shelley Kitchen
- Tamsyn Leevey

Malaysia

- Nicol David
- Low Wee Wern
- Delia Arnold
- Sharon Wee

Hong Kong

- Liu Tsz-Ling
- Elise Ng
- Carman Lee
- Karman Siu

Canada

- Miranda Ranieri
- Alexandra Norman
- Stephanie Edmison
- Samantha Cornett

== Group stage results ==
=== Pool A ===
England	3	-	0	United States
Netherlands	3	-	0	Austria
Netherlands	0	-	3	England
Austria	0	-	3	United States
Austria	0	-	3	England
Netherlands	1	-	2	United States

Rank	Nation	Match	Win	Low	Points
1	England	3	3	0	6
2	United States	3	2	1	4
3	Netherlands	3	1	2	2
4	Austria	3	0	2	0

=== Pool B ===
Australia	3	-	0	Japan
(Republic of Ireland) Ireland	2	-	1	India
(Republic of Ireland) Ireland	3	-	0	Japan
India	0	-	3	Australia
(Republic of Ireland) Ireland	0	-	3	Australia
India	3	-	0	Japan

Rank	Nation	Match	Win	Low	Points
1	Australia	3	3	0	6
2	(Republic of Ireland) Ireland	3	2	1	4
3	India	3	1	2	2
4	Japan	3	0	3	0

=== Pool C ===
Egypt	3	-	0	South Africa
France	3	-	0	Mexico
France	0	-	3	Egypt
Mexico	0	-	3	South Africa
Mexico	0	-	3	Egypt
France	3	-	0	South Africa

Rank	Nation	Match	Win	Low	Points
1	Egypt	3	3	0	6
2	France	3	2	1	4
3	South Africa	3	1	2	2
4	Mexico	3	0	3	0

=== Pool D ===
Malaysia	3	-	0	Hong Kong
New Zealand	3	-	0	Canada
Canada	0	-	3	Malaysia
New Zealand	3	-	0	Hong Kong
New Zealand	2	-	1	Malaysia
Canada	1	-	2	Hong Kong

Rank	Nation	Match	Win	Low	Points
1	New Zealand	3	3	0	6
2	Malaysia	3	2	1	4
3	Hong Kong	3	1	2	2
4	Canada	3	0	3	0

== Finals ==
=== Draw ===
Quarterfinals
1	England	3	3	2
7	(Republic of Ireland) Ireland	0	0	0
5	New Zealand	3	0	3
6	France	0	3	0
4	Malaysia	0	3	3
3	Egypt	3	1	2
9	United States	0	0
2	Australia	3	2	3

Semifinals
1	England	1	3	3
5	New Zealand	3	1	2
4	Malaysia	0	3	0
2	Australia	3	0	3

Final
1	England	0	3	1
2	Australia	3	0	3
Third place match
5	New Zealand	3	0	1
4	Malaysia	0	3	3

=== Results ===
==== Quarter-finals ====
England
3
QUARTER FINAL
Palmerston North, New Zealand
2 December 2010
Glass Court

Ireland
0

			1	2	3	4	5
1	(England) (Republic of Ireland)	N°2 Laura Massaro; N°2 Laura Mylotte	11; 2	11; 4	11; 7
2	(England) (Republic of Ireland)	N°1 Jenny Duncalf; N°1 Aisling Blake	11; 5	11; 6	11; 5
3	(England) (Republic of Ireland)	N°3 Tania Bailey; N°3 Zoe Barr	11; 3	11; 6

New Zealand
2
QUARTER FINAL
Palmerston North, New Zealand
2 December 2010
Glass Court

France
1

			1	2	3	4	5
1	(New Zealand) (France)	N°2 Joelle King; N°2 Isabelle Stoehr	11; 9	11; 3	11; 4
2	(New Zealand) (France)	N°1 Jaclyn Hawkes; N°1 Camille Serme	7; 11	5; 11	7; 11
3	(New Zealand) (France)	N°3 Shelley Kitchen; N°3 Coline Aumard	11; 5	11; 5	11; 4

Malaysia
2
QUARTER FINAL
Palmerston North, New Zealand
2 December 2010
Glass Court

Egypt
1

			1	2	3	4	5
1	(Malaysia) (Egypt)	N°2 Low Wee Wern; N°2 Raneem El Weleily	5; 11	4; 11	4; 11
2	(Malaysia) (Egypt)	N°1 Nicol David; N°1 Omneya Abdel Kawy	11; 9	11; 3	8; 11	11; 4
3	(Malaysia) (Egypt)	N°3 Delia Arnold; N°3 Engy Kheirallah	11; 9	6; 11	11; 3	9; 11	11; 8

United States
1
QUARTER FINAL
Palmerston North, New Zealand
2 December 2010
Glass Court

Australia
2

			1	2	3	4	5
1	(United States) (Australia)	N°2 Latasha Khan; N°2 Kasey Brown	3; 11	5; 11	6; 11
2	(United States) (Australia)	N°1 Natalie Grainger; N°1 Rachael Grinham	7; 11	6; 11	11; 9	11; 7	12; 10
3	(United States) (Australia)	N°3 Olivia Blatchford; N°3 Sarah Fitzgerald	4; 11	1; 11	2; 11

==== Semi-finals ====
England
2
SEMI FINAL
Palmerston North, New Zealand
3 December 2010
Glass Court

New Zealand
1

			1	2	3	4	5
1	(England) (New Zealand)	N°3 Tania Bailey; N°3 Shelley Kitchen	8; 11	11; 9	13; 15	7; 11
2	(England) (New Zealand)	N°1 Jenny Duncalf; N°1 Jaclyn Hawkes	7; 11	11; 9	11; 6	11; 9
3	(England) (New Zealand)	N°2 Laura Massaro; N°2 Joelle King	5; 11	7; 11	11; 7	11; 2	11; 7

Malaysia
1
SEMI FINAL
Palmerston North, New Zealand
3 December 2010
Glass Court

Australia
2

			1	2	3	4	5
1	(Malaysia) (Australia)	N°3 Sharon Wee; N°3 Sarah Fitzgerald	5; 11	11; 13	7; 11
2	(Malaysia) (Australia)	N°1 Nicol David; N°1 Rachael Grinham	11; 8	11; 5	11; 5
3	(Malaysia) (Australia)	N°2 Delia Arnold; N°2 Kasey Brown	6; 11	3; 11	10; 12

==== Final ====
England
1
FINAL
Palmerston North, New Zealand
4 December 2010
Glass Court

Australia
2

			1	2	3	4	5
1	(England) (Australia)	N°3 Sarah Kippax; N°3 Sarah Fitzgerald	4; 11	4; 11	4; 11
2	(England) (Australia)	N°1 Jenny Duncalf; N°1 Rachael Grinham	11; 7	11; 4	11; 9
3	(England) (Australia)	N°2 Laura Massaro; N°2 Kasey Brown	6; 11	9; 11	11; 8	8; 11

2010 WSF World Team Championship

Australia
9th title

Team
Rachael Grinham - Kasey Brown - Sarah Fitzgerald - Donna Urquhart

== Post-tournament team ranking ==
Position	Team	Result
1st	Australia	Champions
2nd	England	Final
3rd	Malaysia	Semi-final
4th	New Zealand	Semi-final
5th	Egypt	Quarter-final
6th	France	Quarter-final
7th	United States	Quarter-final
8th	(Republic of Ireland) Ireland	Quarter-final

Position	Team	Result
9th	Netherlands	Group Stage
10th	South Africa	Group Stage
11th	India	Group Stage
12th	Hong Kong	Group Stage
13th	Canada	Group Stage
14th	Japan	Group Stage
15th	Mexico	Group Stage
16th	Austria	Group Stage

== See also ==
- World Team Squash Championships

Preceded by Egypt (Cairo); 2008	Squash World Team; New Zealand (Palmerston North); 2010	Succeeded by France (Nîmes); 2012
