= 2016 Women's World Team Squash Championships =

Women's World Team 2016
- 20th WSF World Women's Team Championship
- Location: Issy-les-Moulineaux, France
- Date(s): November 27 – December 3, 2016
- Teams: 17 (from all the 5 confederations)
- Website www.wsfwomensteams.com/history/

Results
- Champions: Egypt
- Runners-up: England
- Third place: France / Hong Kong

The 2016 Women's World Team Squash Championships was the women's edition of the 2016 World Team Squash Championships, which serves as the world team championship for squash players. The event was held in Issy-les-Moulineaux, France from November 27 to December 3, 2016. The tournament was organized by the World Squash Federation and the French Squash Federation. The Egypt team won its third World Team Championships, beating the England team in the final.

== Participating teams ==
17 teams competed in these world championships from all of the five confederations: Africa, America, Asia, Europe and Oceania.

Africa (SFA)	America (FPS)	Asia (ASF)	Europe (ESF)	Oceania (OSF)
Egypt	Canada; Mexico; United States	Hong Kong; Japan; India; Malaysia	Austria; England (Title holder); France (Host country); Germany; Netherlands; Spain; Wales	Australia; New Zealand

== Seeds ==
1. Egypt (Champion)
2. England (Final)
3. Malaysia (Quarterfinals)
4. Hong Kong (Semifinals)
5. France (Semifinals)
6. Australia (Quarterfinals)
7. United States (Quarterfinals)
8. New Zealand (Quarterfinals)

== Squads ==
Egypt

- Nour El Sherbini
- Nouran Gohar
- Raneem El Weleily
- Omneya Abdel Kawy

New Zealand

- Joelle King
- Amanda Landers-Murphy
- Megan Craig
- Emma Millar

India

- Joshna Chinappa
- Dipika Pallikal
- Akanksha Salunkhe
- Sunayna Kuruvilla

Mexico

- Diana García
- Nayelly Hernández
- Dina Anguiano
- Sarahi Lopez

England

- Laura Massaro
- Alison Waters
- Sarah-Jane Perry
- Victoria Lust

United States

- Amanda Sobhy
- Olivia Blatchford
- Sabrina Sobhy
- Reeham Sadky

Canada

- Samantha Cornett
- Hollie Naughton
- Danielle Letourneau
- Nikki Todd

Wales

- Tesni Evans
- Nia Davies
- Lowri Roberts
- Hannah Davies

Malaysia

- Nicol David
- Delia Arnold
- Rachel Arnold
- Sivasangari Subramaniam

Australia

- Rachael Grinham
- Donna Urquhart
- Christine Nunn
- Tamika Saxby

Netherlands

- Milou van der Heijden
- Natalie Grinham
- Tessa Ter Sluis
- Milja Dorenbos

Austria

- Birgit Coufal
- Sandra Polak
- Sabrina Rehman
- Judith van der Merwe

Hong Kong

- Annie Au
- Joey Chan
- Liu Tsz Ling
- Tong Tsz Wing

France

- Camille Serme
- Coline Aumard
- Chloé Mesic
- Laura Pomportes

Japan

- Misaki Kobayashi
- Satomi Watanabe
- Risa Sugimoto
- Mami Sakai

Germany

- Sina Wall
- Sharon Sinclair
- Franziska Hennes
- Saskia Beinhard

Spain

- Xisela Aranda Núñez
- Cristina Gómez
- Marta Latorre Ramirez
- Marina De Juan Gallach

== Group stage ==
=== Pool A ===
November 28, 2016

Egypt	3	-	0	India
New Zealand	3	-	0	Mexico

November 29, 2016

Egypt	3	-	0	New Zealand
India	3	-	0	Mexico

November 30, 2016

Egypt	3	-	0	Mexico
New Zealand	2	-	1	India

Rank	Nation	Match	Win	Low	Points
1	Egypt	3	3	0	6
2	New Zealand	3	2	1	4
3	India	3	1	2	2
4	Mexico	3	0	3	0

=== Pool B ===
November 28, 2016

England	3	-	0	Canada
United States	3	-	0	Wales

November 29, 2016

England	2	-	1	United States
Canada	2	-	1	Wales

November 30, 2016

England	2	-	1	Wales
United States	2	-	1	Canada

Rank	Nation	Match	Win	Low	Points
1	England	3	3	0	6
2	United States	3	2	1	4
3	Canada	3	1	2	2
4	Wales	3	0	3	0

=== Pool C ===
November 28, 2016

Malaysia	3	-	0	Netherlands
Australia	3	-	0	Austria

November 29, 2016

Malaysia	3	-	0	Australia
Netherlands	3	-	0	Austria

November 30, 2016

Malaysia	3	-	0	Austria
Australia	2	-	1	Netherlands

Rank	Nation	Match	Win	Low	Points
1	Malaysia	3	3	0	6
2	Australia	3	2	1	4
3	Netherlands	3	1	2	2
4	Austria	3	0	3	0

=== Pool D ===
November 28, 2016

France	3	-	0	Spain
Hong Kong	3	-	0	Japan

France	3	-	0	Germany
Hong Kong	2	-	1	Spain

November 29, 2016

Hong Kong	3	-	0	Germany
Japan	2	-	1	Germany

France	2	-	1	Japan
Germany	1	-	2	Spain

November 30, 2016

Japan	2	-	1	Spain
Hong Kong	1	-	2	France

Rank	Nation	Match	Win	Low	Points
1	France	4	4	0	8
2	Hong Kong	4	3	1	6
3	Japan	4	2	2	4
4	Spain	4	1	3	2
5	Germany	4	0	4	0

== Finals ==
=== Draw ===
Quarter-finals
1	Egypt	3	3	2
7	United States	0	1	0
5	France	3	3
6	Australia	1	0
4	Hong Kong	3	0	3
3	Malaysia	2	3	1
8	New Zealand	1	0	0
2	England	3	3	2

Semi-finals
1	Egypt	3	3	2
5	France	0	0	0
4	Hong Kong	1	0
2	England	3	3

Final
1	Egypt	1	3	3
2	England	3	0	0

=== Results ===
==== Quarterfinals ====
Egypt
3
QUARTER FINAL
Issy-les-Moulineaux, France
1 December 2016
Central Glass Court

United States
0

			1	2	3	4	5
1	(Egypt) (United States)	N°2 Nouran Gohar; N°2 Olivia Blatchford	11; 3	11; 4	11; 7
2	(Egypt) (United States)	N°1 Nour El Sherbini; N°1 Amanda Sobhy	11; 7	11; 9	4; 11	13; 11
3	(Egypt) (United States)	N°3 Raneem El Weleily; N°3 Reeham Sedky	12; 10	11; 5

France
3
QUARTER FINAL
Issy-les-Moulineaux, France
1 December 2016
Central Glass Court

Australia
0

			1	2	3	4	5
1	(France) (Australia)	N°2 Coline Aumard; N°2 Rachael Grinham	8; 11	11; 6	11; 9	11; 4
2	(France) (Australia)	N°1 Camille Serme; N°1 Donna Urquhart	11; 6	11; 3	11; 3
3	(France) (Australia)	N°3 Laura Pomportes; N°3 Tamika Saxby	11; 6	12; 10

Malaysia
1
QUARTER FINAL
Issy-les-Moulineaux, France
1 December 2016
Central Glass Court

Hong Kong
2

			1	2	3	4	5
1	(Malaysia) (Hong Kong)	N°2 Delia Arnold; N°2 Joey Chan	11; 8	5; 11	11; 9	3; 11	6; 11
2	(Malaysia) (Hong Kong)	N°1 Nicol David; N°1 Annie Au	11; 7	11; 2	11; 4
3	(Malaysia) (Hong Kong)	N°3 Sivasangari Subramaniam; N°3 Tong Tsz Wing	9; 11	15; 13	11; 13	6; 11

New Zealand
0
QUARTER FINAL
Issy-les-Moulineaux, France
1 December 2016
Central Glass Court

England
3

			1	2	3	4	5
1	(New Zealand) (England)	N°2 Delia Arnold; N°2 Sarah-Jane Perry	7; 11	11; 4	6; 11	9; 11
2	(New Zealand) (England)	N°1 Joelle King; N°1 Laura Massaro	6; 11	8; 11	3; 11
3	(New Zealand) (England)	N°3 Amanda Landers-Murphy; N°3 Victoria Lust	5; 11	7; 11

==== Semifinals ====
Egypt
3
SEMI FINAL
Issy-les-Moulineaux, France
2 December 2016
Central Glass Court

France
0

			1	2	3	4	5
1	(Egypt) (France)	N°1 Nour El Sherbini; N°1 Camille Serme	11; 8	12; 10	11; 9
2	(Egypt) (France)	N°3 Raneem El Weleily; N°3 Laura Pomportes	11; 3	11; 3	11; 4
3	(Egypt) (France)	N°2 Nouran Gohar; N°2 Coline Aumard	11; 5	11; 6

Hong Kong
0
SEMI FINAL
Issy-les-Moulineaux, France
2 December 2016
Central Glass Court

England
2

			1	2	3	4	5
1	(Hong Kong) (England)	N°1 Annie Au; N°1 Laura Massaro	11; 3	7; 11	6; 11	7; 11
2	(Hong Kong) (England)	N°3 Liu Tsz Ling; N°3 Sarah-Jane Perry	4; 11	4; 11	9; 11
3	(Hong Kong) (England)	N°2 Joey Chan; N°2 Alison Waters

==== Final ====
Egypt
2
FINAL
Issy-les-Moulineaux, France
3 December 2016
Central Glass Court

England
1

			1	2	3	4	5
1	(Egypt) (England)	N°1 Nour El Sherbini; N°1 Laura Massaro	11; 9	5; 11	6; 11	6; 11
2	(Egypt) (England)	N°2 Nouran Gohar; N°2 Alison Waters	11; 6	11; 4	12; 10
3	(Egypt) (England)	N°3 Raneem El Weleily; N°3 Sarah-Jane Perry	12; 10	11; 4	11; 6

== Post-tournament team ranking ==
Position	Team	Result
1st	Egypt	Champions
2nd	England	Final
3rd	France	Semi Final
3rd	Hong Kong	Semi Final
5th	United States	Quarter Final
6th	Malaysia	Quarter Final
7th	New Zealand	Quarter Final
8th	Australia	Quarter Final

Position	Team	Result
9th	India	Group Stage
10th	Canada	Group Stage
11th	Japan	Group Stage
12th	Netherlands	Group Stage
13th	Spain	Group Stage
14th	Germany	Group Stage
15th	Mexico	Group Stage
16th	Wales	Group Stage

Position	Team	Result
17th	Austria	Group Stage

== See also ==
- World Team Squash Championships

Preceded by Canada (Niagara-on-the-Lake); 2014	Squash World Team; France (Issy-les-Moulineaux); 2016	Succeeded by World Women's Team; 2018
