= Squash in Egypt =

- Country: Egypt
- Governing body: Egyptian Squash Association
- National teams: Egypt men's national squash team Egypt women's national squash team Egypt men's national junior squash team Egypt women's national junior squash team

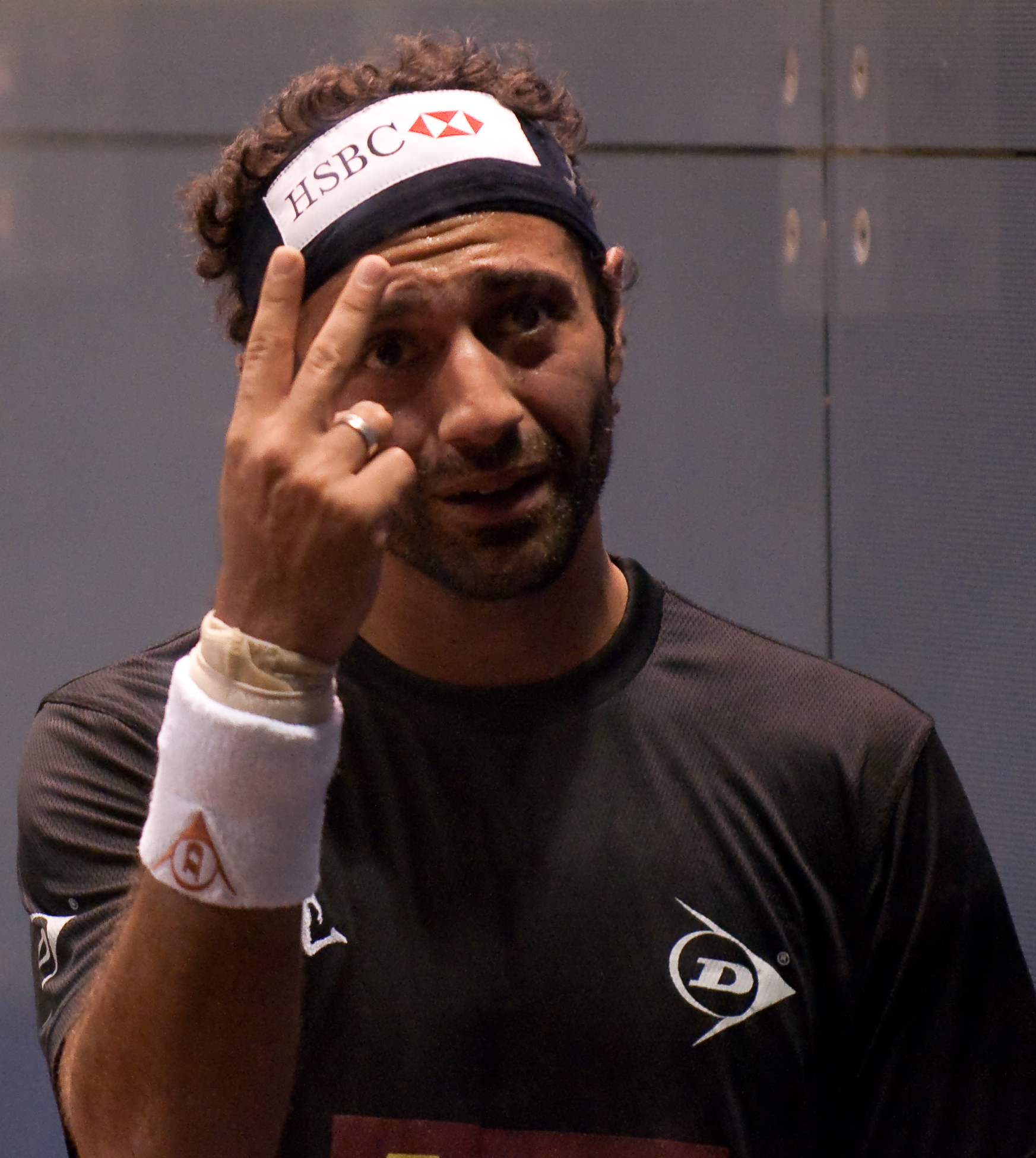
Former world number one Amr Shabana

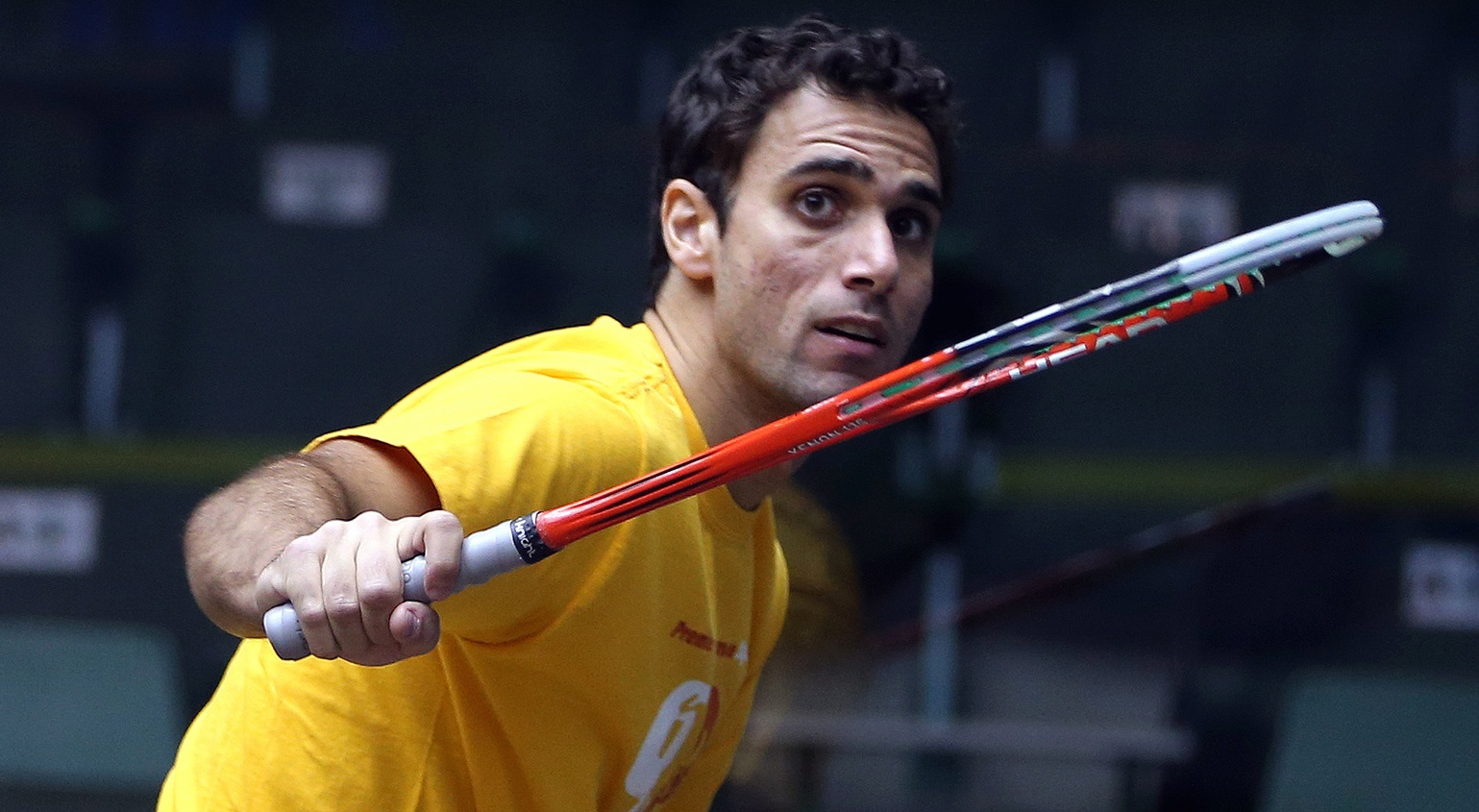
Former world number one Karim Darwish

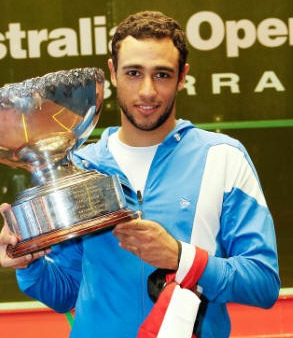
Former world number one Ramy Ashour

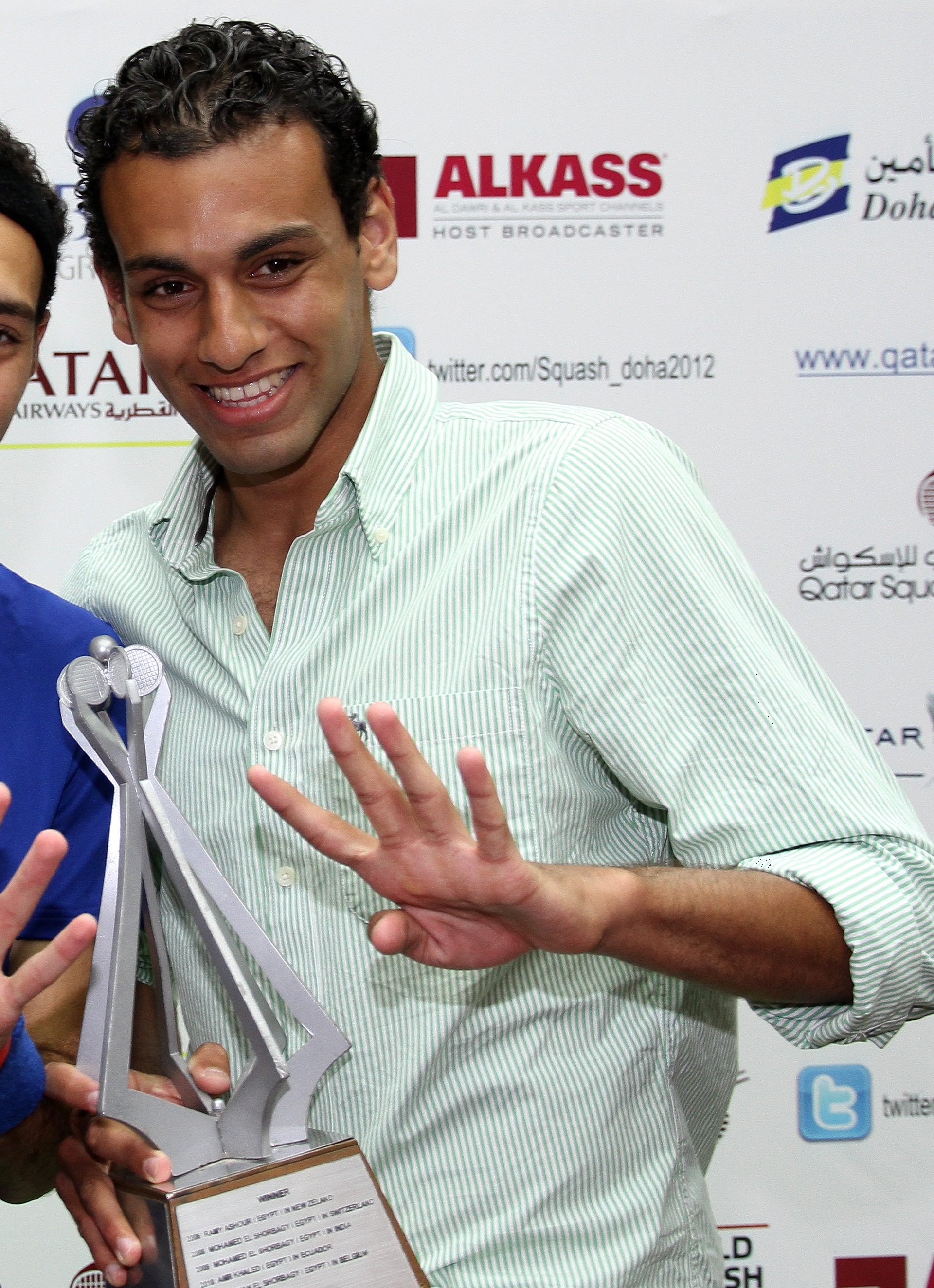
Former world number one Mohamed El Shorbagy

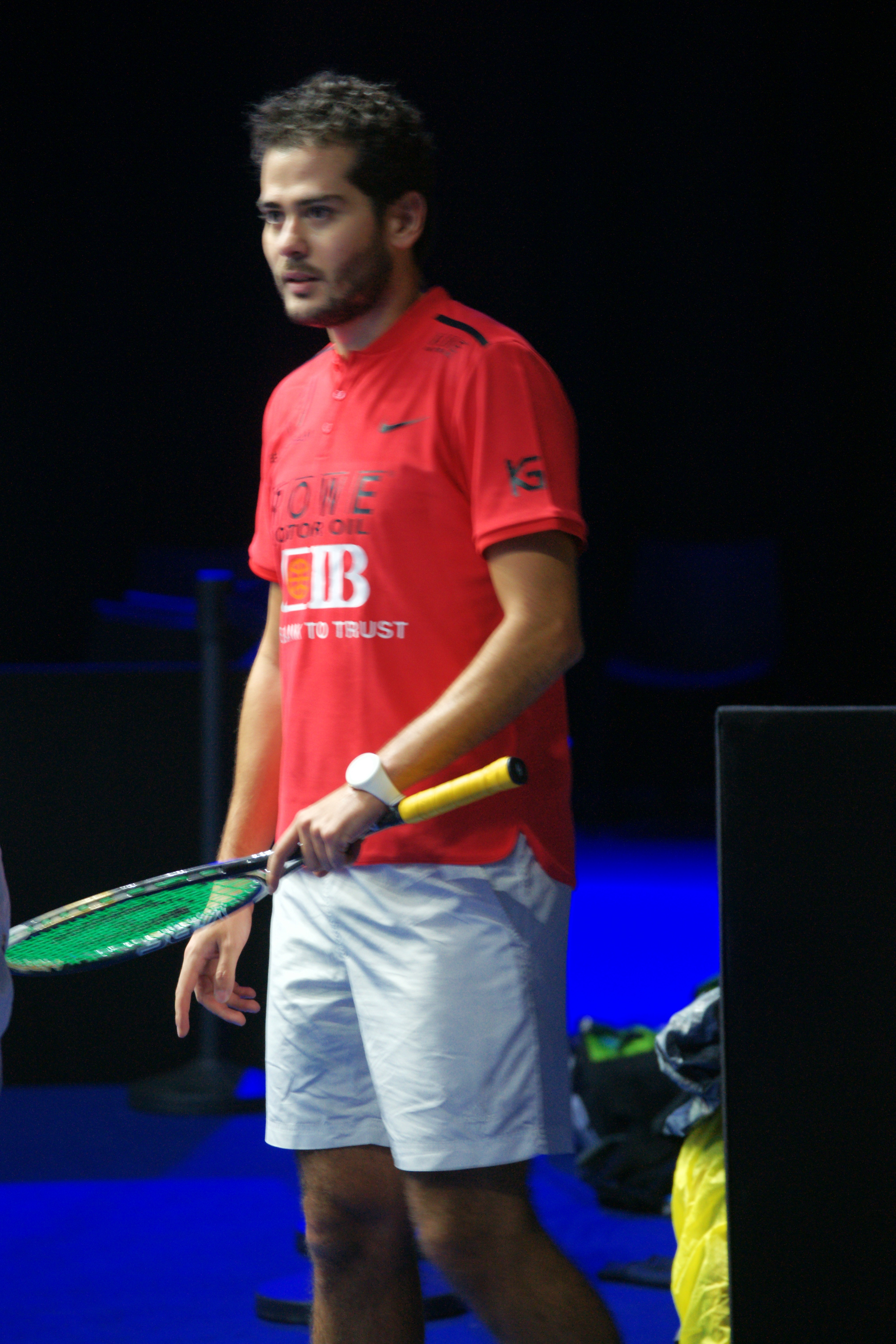
Former world number one Karim Abdel Gawad

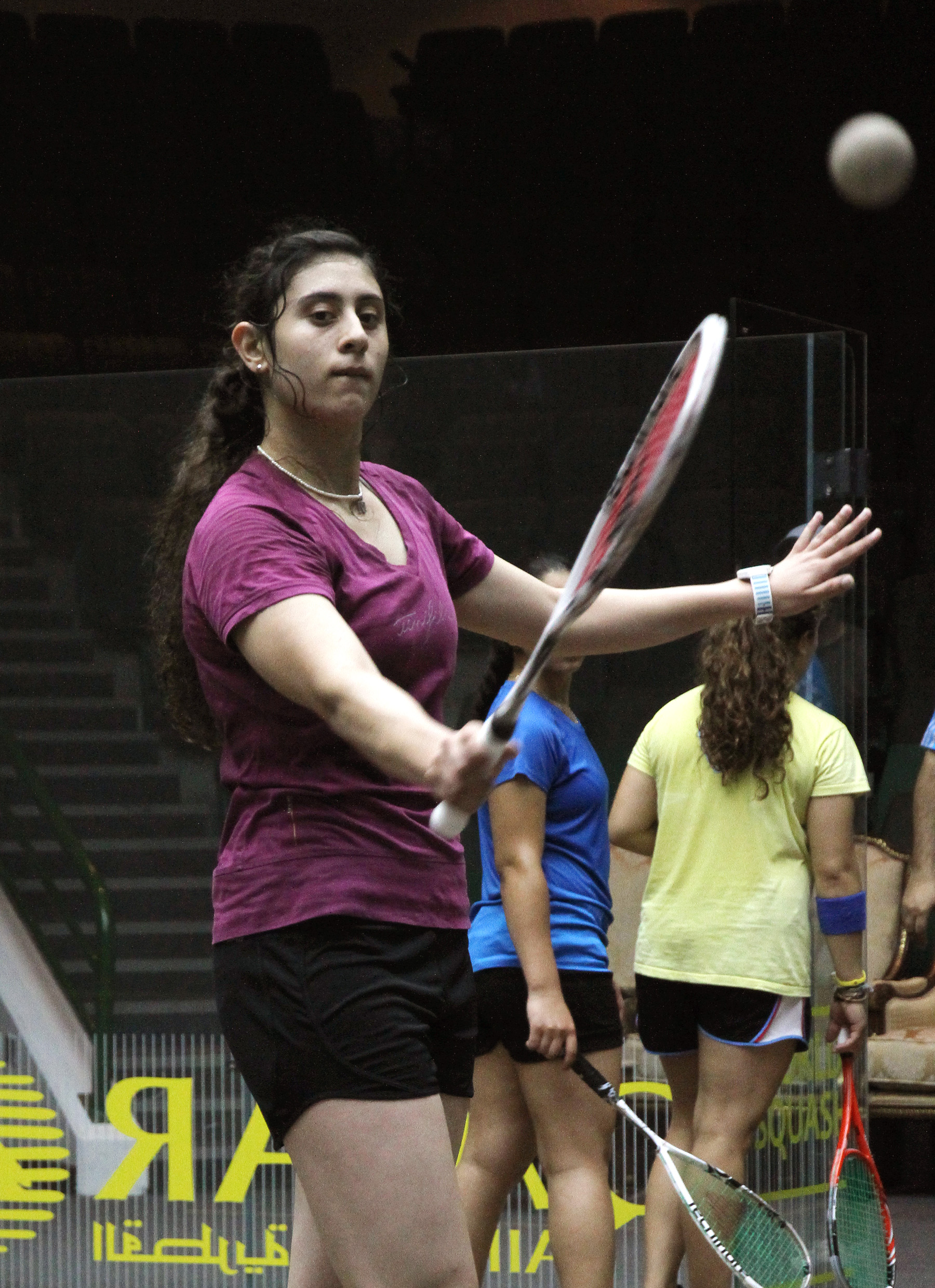
Former world number one Nour El Sherbini

Squash is a popular sport in Egypt. The country has been producing top players since the 1930s, and it is believed that former president Hosni Mubarak, a keen player himself, gave the sport a major boost in the 1990s. It has also been said that the current success is the result of an investment in the sport of Egyptian society as a whole.

== Professional competitions ==
Many professional squash competitions take place in Egypt each year.

=== PSA World Tour ===
Egyptian events in the PSA World Tour calendar include the El Gouna International (PSA150) and the Alexandria International tournaments.

== Top players ==
As of April 2018, Egypt boasted 5 out of the top 10 male players in the world and 5 out of the top 10 female players in the world. The El Shorbagy brothers had been particularly successful, with Mohamed and Marwan being the world numbers 2 and 6 respectively.

=== World number ones ===
Egypt has produced the following world number ones:

- Men:
  - Amr Shabana
  - Karim Darwish
  - Ramy Ashour
  - Mohamed El Shorbagy
  - Karim Abdel Gawad
  - Ali Farag
  - Mostafa Asal
- Women:
  - Raneem El Weleily
  - Nour El Sherbini
  - Nouran Gohar

=== Highest ranked players ===
As of August 2022, the highest ranked Egyptian squash players were:

- Men:
  - Ali Farag (1)
  - Mostafa Asal (3)
  - Tarek Momen (6)
  - Mazen Hesham (8)
  - Marwan Elshorbagy (9)
- Women:
  - Nouran Gohar (1)
  - Nour El Sherbini (2)
  - Hania El Hammamy (3)
  - Rowan Elaraby (7)
  - Salma Hany (9)

== National teams ==
Egypt has national men's, women's, men's junior, women's junior teams that represent the country in international squash competitions.

== Governance ==
Squash in Egypt is governed by the Egyptian Squash Association, which was founded in 1991.

== See also ==
- Sport in Egypt
