= Egypt men's national junior squash team =

Egypt
- Coach: Andrew Shoukry
- Association: Egyptian Squash Association
- Colors: Black & Red

World Team Championships
- First year: 1975
- Titles: 9 (1994, 2006, 2010, 2012, 2014, 2018, 2024, 2025, 2026)
- Runners-up: 8 (7 Official)
- Best finish: 1st
- Entries: 22 (20 Official)

The Egypt men's national junior squash team represents Egypt in international squash team competitions, and is governed by the Egyptian Squash Association.

Since 1975, Egypt has won 9 World Junior Team Championships titles. Their most recent title came in 2026

== Current team ==
The following players are representing Egypt in the World Junior Team Championships 2025.

- Eiad Daoud
- Marwan Assal
- Adhdam Roshdy
- Mohamed Zakaria

== Results ==
=== World Junior Team Championships ===
- The event was held unofficially from 1973 to 1979.

Year	Result	Position	W	L
(England) Sydenham 1973	Did not present			
(England) Bournemouth 1974	Did not present			
(Scotland) Edinburgh 1975	Final	2nd		
(Wales) Cardiff 1976	Did not present			
(Republic of Ireland) Dublin 1977	Did not present			
(Sweden) Sundsvall 1978	Did not present			
(England) Southampton 1979	Group Stage	7th		
(Sweden) Kungälv 1980	Did not present			
Singapore 1982	Did not present			
(Canada) Calgary 1984	Did not present			
(Australia) Brisbane 1986	Quarter Final	6th	4	4
(Scotland) Edinburgh 1988	Did not present			
(Germany) Paderborn 1990	Group Stage	15th	5	3
Hong Kong 1992	Semi Final	4th	5	3
(New Zealand) Christchurch 1994	Champions	1st	6	0
(Egypt) Cairo 1996	Final	2nd	5	1
(United States) Princeton 1998	Final	2nd	4	2
(Italy) Milan 2000	Final	2nd	6	1
(India) Chennai 2002	Semi Final	3rd	5	1
(Pakistan) Islamabad 2004	Final	2nd	5	1
(New Zealand) Palmerston North 2006	Champions	1st	7	0
(Switzerland) Zurich 2008	Final	2nd	6	1
(Ecuador) Quito 2010	Champions	1st	6	0
(Qatar) Doha 2012	Champions	1st	6	0
(Namibia) Windhoek 2014	Champions	1st	6	0
(Poland) Bielsko-Biała 2016	Final	2nd	4	1
(India) Chennai 2018	Champions	1st	6	0
Australia 2020	Cancelled			
(France) Nancy 2022	Final	2nd	4	1
(United States) Houston 2024	Champions	1st	5	1
(Egypt) New Cairo 2025	Champions	1st	5	0
(Canada) Ontario 2026	Champions	1st	6	0
Total	22/31	9 Titles	106	20

== See also ==
- Squash in Egypt
- Egyptian Squash Association
- World Junior Squash Championships
- Egypt men's national squash team
- Egypt women's national squash team
- Egypt women's national junior squash team
