= Pamela Hathway =

German squash player (born 1987)

Personal information
- Born: 25 October 1987 (age 38) Munich, Germany

Sport
- Country: Germany
- Handedness: Right Handed
- Turned pro: 2008
- Coached by: Uli Brennstuhl

Women's singles
- Highest ranking: No. 138 (March 2009)
- Title: 1
- Tour final: 2
- Updated on August 2013

Pamela Hathway (born 25 October 1987 in Munich) is a professional squash player who represents Germany. She reached a career-high world ranking of World No. 138 in March 2009.
