= Squash Canada =

Sports governing body in Canada

- Sport: Squash
- Founded: 1915
- Regional affiliation: Federation of Panamerica
- Location: Ottawa, Ontario
- President: Steve Wren

Official website
- www.squash.ca
- (Canada)

Squash Canada is the national sport association responsible for the development of athletes, coaches and officials in Canada. Founded in 1915, Squash Canada sets the Canadian standards for Squash and works with partners to promote the growth and development of the sport across the country.

== Organization ==
Squash Canada (108075714rr0001) was registered with Canadian Revenue Agency as a Canadian amateur athletic association (RCAAA); therefore, they can issue official donation receipts and are eligible to receive gifts from registered charities since 1983-01-01.

== See also ==
- Canada men's national squash team
- Canada women's national squash team
