= Egypt men's national squash team =

Egypt
- Coach: Ashraf Hanfi
- Association: Egyptian Squash Association
- Colors: Black & Red

World Team Championships
- First year: 1969
- Titles: 7 (1999, 2009, 2011, 2017, 2019, 2023, 2024)
- Runners-up: 3
- Best finish: 1st
- Entries: 26

The Egypt men's national squash team represents Egypt in international squash team competitions, and is governed by the Egyptian Squash Association.

Since 1969, Egypt has won 7 WSF World Team Championships titles. Their most recent title came in 2024.

== Current team ==
The following players represented Egypt in the World Team Championships 2024, where Egypt won their seventh title.

- Ali Farag
- Mostafa Asal
- Mazen Hesham
- Karim Abdel Gawad

== Results ==
=== WSF Men's World Team Championships ===
Year	Result	Position	W	L
(Australia) Melbourne 1967	Did not present			
(England) Birmingham 1969	Group Stage	6th	0	5
(New Zealand) Palmerston North 1971	Group Stage	4th	4	2
(South Africa) Johannesburg 1973	Did not present			
(England) Birmingham 1976	Group Stage	4th	3	3
(Canada) Toronto 1977	Group Stage	3rd	6	1
(Australia) Brisbane 1979	Semi Final	4th	5	3
(Sweden) Stockholm 1981	Semi Final	3rd	6	1
(New Zealand) Auckland 1983	Semi Final	4th	6	3
(Egypt) Cairo 1985	Group Stage	5th	5	4
(England) London 1987	Quarter Final	6th	5	3
Singapore 1989	Quarter Final	5th	4	4
(Finland) Helsinki 1991	Semi Final	4th	1	4
(Pakistan) Karachi 1993	Group Stage	6th	3	3
(Egypt) Cairo 1995	Semi Final	3rd	3	3
(Malaysia) Petaling Jaya 1997	Semi Final	4th	3	3
(Egypt) Cairo 1999	Champions	1st	5	1
(Australia) Melbourne 2001	Final	2nd	6	3
(Austria) Vienna 2003	Semi Final	4th	5	2
(Pakistan) Islamabad 2005	Final	2nd	5	1
(India) Chennai 2007	Semi Final	4th	5	2
(Denmark) Odense 2009	Champions	1st	7	0
(Germany) Paderborn 2011	Champions	1st	7	0
(France) Mulhouse 2013	Final	2nd	6	1
(Egypt) Cairo 2015	Cancelled			
(France) Marseille 2017	Champions	1st	7	0
(United States) Washington 2019	Champions	1st	5	0
(Malaysia) Kuala Lumpur 2021	Cancelled			
(New Zealand) Tauranga 2023	Champions	1st	6	0
Hong Kong 2024	Champions	1st	6	0
Total	26/28	7 Titles	124	52

== See also ==
- Squash in Egypt
- Egyptian Squash Association
- World Team Squash Championships
- Egypt women's national squash team
- Egypt men's national junior squash team
- Egypt women's national junior squash team
