= United States women's national squash team =

- Coach: Nick Taylor
- Association: U.S. Squash
- Colors: Red, Blue & White

World Team Championships
- First year: 1979
- Titles: 0
- Runners-up: (2022, 2024)
- Best finish: 2nd
- Entries: 23

Medal record

World Team Championships
| Silver medal – second place | 2022 Cairo | Team |
| Silver medal – second place | 2024 Hong Kong | Team |

Pan American Games
| Gold medal – first place | 2003 Santo Domingo | Team |
| Gold medal – first place | 2015 Toronto | Team |
| Gold medal – first place | 2019 Lima | Team |
| Gold medal – first place | 2023 Santiago | Team |
| Silver medal – second place | 1995 Mar del Plata | Team |
| Silver medal – second place | 1999 Winnipeg | Team |
| Silver medal – second place | 2007 Rio de Janeiro | Team |
| Bronze medal – third place | 2011 Guadalajara | Team |

The United States women's national squash team represents United States in international squash team competitions, and is governed by the U.S. Squash.

Since 1979, United States has won two silver medals of the World Squash Team Championships.

== Current team ==
- Amanda Sobhy
- Olivia Blatchford
- Sabrina Sobhy
- Reeham Sedky

== Results ==
=== World Squash Team Championships ===
| Year | Result | Position | W | L |
|---|---|---|---|---|
| (England) Birmingham 1979 | Group Stage | 6th | 0 | 5 |
| (Canada) Toronto 1981 | Group Stage | 11th | 2 | 6 |
| (Australia) Perth 1983 | Group Stage | 6th | 2 | 3 |
| (Republic of Ireland) Dublin 1985 | Group Stage | 7th | 3 | 4 |
| (New Zealand) Auckland 1987 | Group Stage | 12th | 2 | 5 |
| (Netherlands) Warmond 1989 | Group Stage | 12th | 2 | 3 |
| (Australia) Sydney 1990 | Group Stage | 10th | 5 | 1 |
| (Canada) Vancouver 1992 | Group Stage | 11th | 4 | 2 |
| (England) Guernsey 1994 | Group Stage | 8th | 4 | 2 |
| (Malaysia) Petaling Jaya 1996 | Group Stage | 12th | 1 | 5 |
| (Germany) Stuttgart 1998 | Group Stage | 9th | 3 | 3 |
| (England) Sheffield 2000 | Group Stage | 18th | 4 | 3 |
| (Denmark) Odense 2002 | Group Stage | 15th | 2 | 6 |
| (Netherlands) Amsterdam 2004 | Quarter Final | 8th | 2 | 4 |
| (Canada) Edmonton 2006 | Group Stage | 11th | 3 | 3 |
| (Egypt) Cairo 2008 | Group Stage | 14th | 3 | 4 |
| (New Zealand) Palmerston North 2010 | Quarter Final | 7th | 3 | 3 |
| (France) Nîmes 2012 | Round of 16 | 13th | 3 | 3 |
| (Canada) Niagara-on-the-Lake 2014 | Quarter Final | 5th | 5 | 2 |
| (France) Issy-les-Moulineaux 2016 | Quarter Final | 5th | 5 | 1 |
| (China) Dalian 2018 | Quarter Final | 5th | 5 | 1 |
| (Malaysia) Kuala Lumpur 2020 | Cancelled due to COVID-19 pandemic | | | |
| (Egypt) Cairo 2022 | Runners-up | 2nd place, silver medalist(s) | 5 | 1 |
| Hong Kong 2024 | Runners-up | 2nd place, silver medalist(s) | 5 | 1 |
| Total | 0 Title | 23/24 | 73 | 71 |

=== Pan American Games ===
| Year | Result | Position | W | L |
|---|---|---|---|---|
| (Argentina) Mar del Plata 1995 | Silver medal | 2nd place, silver medalist(s) | | |
| (Canada) Winnipeg 1999 | Silver medal | 2nd place, silver medalist(s) | | |
| (Dominican Republic) Santo Domingo 2003 | Gold medal | 1st place, gold medalist(s) | 3 | 0 |
| (Brazil) Rio de Janeiro 2007 | Silver medal | 2nd place, silver medalist(s) | 3 | 1 |
| (Mexico) Guadalajara 2011 | Bronze medal | 3rd place, bronze medalist(s) | 3 | 1 |
| (Canada) Toronto 2015 | Gold medal | 1st place, gold medalist(s) | 5 | 0 |
| (Peru) Lima 2019 | Gold medal | 1st place, gold medalist(s) | 6 | 0 |
| (Chile) Santiago 2023 | Gold medal | 1st place, gold medalist(s) | 3 | 0 |
| Total | 4 Titles | 8/8 | | |

== See also ==
- U.S. Squash
- World Team Squash Championships
- United States men's national squash team
