= New Zealand women's national squash team =

New Zealand
- Coach: Anthony Ricketts
- Association: Squash New Zealand
- Colors: Black & White

World Team Championships
- First year: 1981
- Titles: 0
- Runners-up: 2
- Best finish: 2nd
- Entries: 18

The New Zealand women's national squash team represents New Zealand in international squash team competitions, and is governed by Squash New Zealand.

Since 1981, New Zealand has participated in two finals of the World Squash Team Open.

== Current team ==
- Joelle King
- Amanda Landers-Murphy
- Megan Craig
- Kylie Lindsay
- Rebecca Barnett

== Results ==
=== World Team Squash Championships ===
Year	Result	Position	W	L
(England) Birmingham 1979	Did not present			
(Canada) Toronto 1981	Semi Final	3rd	6	2
(Australia) Perth 1983	Semi Final	3rd	3	2
(Republic of Ireland) Dublin 1985	Final	2nd	7	1
(New Zealand) Auckland 1987	Semi Final	3rd	5	2
(Netherlands) Warmond 1989	Semi Final	3rd	4	2
(Australia) Sydney 1990	Semi Final	3rd	3	2
(Canada) Vancouver 1992	Final	2nd	4	2
(England) Guernsey 1994	Semi Final	4th	2	3
(Malaysia) Petaling Jaya 1996	Semi Final	4th	3	3
(Germany) Stuttgart 1998	Semi Final	3rd	3	3
(England) Sheffield 2000	Semi Final	3rd	5	1
(Denmark) Odense 2002	Semi Final	3rd	6	1
(Netherlands) Amsterdam 2004	Semi Final	3rd	6	1
(Canada) Edmonton 2006	Quarter Final	5th	4	2
(Egypt) Cairo 2008	Semi Final	4th	5	2
(New Zealand) Palmerston North 2010	Semi Final	4th	4	2
(France) Nîmes 2012	Quarter Final	7th	3	3
(Canada) Niagara-on-the-Lake 2014	Group Stage	10th	4	3
(France) Issy-les-Moulineaux 2016	Quarter Final	7th	2	3
Total	18/19	0 Title	79	40

== See also ==
- Squash New Zealand
- World Team Squash Championships
- New Zealand men's national squash team
