= Egypt women's national squash team =

Egypt
- Coach: Amir Wagih
- Association: Egyptian Squash Association
- Colors: Black

World Team Championships
- First year: 1994
- Titles: 6 (2008, 2012, 2016, 2018, 2022, 2024)
- Runners-up: 1
- Best finish: 1st
- Entries: 15

The Egypt women's national squash team represents Egypt in international squash team competitions, and is governed by Egyptian Squash Association.

Since 1994, Egypt has won 6 WSF World Team Championships titles. Their most recent title came in 2024.

== Current team ==
The following players represented Egypt in the World Team Championships 2024.

- Nour El Sherbini
- Hania El Hammamy
- Amina Orfi
- Rowan Elaraby

=== Others ===
- Nadien Elhammamy
- Malika Elkaraksy
- Sohaila Hazem
- Jayda Marei
- Ruqayya Salem

== Results ==
=== WSF Women's World Team Championships ===
Year	Result	Position	W	L
(England) Birmingham 1979	Did not present			
(Canada) Toronto 1981	Did not present			
(Australia) Perth 1983	Did not present			
(Republic of Ireland) Dublin 1985	Did not present			
(New Zealand) Auckland 1987	Did not present			
(Netherlands) Warmond 1989	Did not present			
(Australia) Sydney 1990	Did not present			
(Canada) Vancouver 1992	Did not present			
(England) Guernsey 1994	Group Stage	14th	4	1
(Malaysia) Petaling Jaya 1996	Group Stage	11th	2	4
(Germany) Stuttgart 1998	Quarter Final	8th	3	3
(England) Sheffield 2000	Semi Final	4th	4	2
(Denmark) Odense 2002	Semi Final	4th	5	2
(Netherlands) Amsterdam 2004	Semi Final	4th	4	2
(Canada) Edmonton 2006	Final	2nd	5	1
(Egypt) Cairo 2008	Champions	1st	7	0
(New Zealand) Palmerston North 2010	Quarter Final	5th	5	1
(France) Nîmes 2012	Champions	1st	6	0
(Canada) Niagara-on-the-Lake 2014	Semi Final	3rd	6	1
(France) Issy-Les-Moulineaux 2016	Champions	1st	6	0
(China) Dalian 2018	Champions	1st	6	0
(Malaysia) Kuala Lumpur 2020	Cancelled			
(Egypt) Cairo 2022	Champions	1st	6	0
Hong Kong 2024	Champions	1st	5	0
Total	15/23	6 Titles	74	17

== See also ==
- Squash in Egypt
- Egyptian Squash Association
- World Team Squash Championships
- Egypt men's national squash team
- Egypt men's national junior squash team
- Egypt women's national junior squash team
