= Canada women's national squash team =

Canada
- Coach: Shauna Flath
- Association: Squash Canada
- Colors: Red

World Team Championships
- First year: 1979
- World Team titles: 0
- Runners-up: 0
- Best finish: 4th
- Entries: 19

The Canada women's national squash team represents Canada in international squash team competitions, and is governed by the Squash Canada.

Since 1979, Canada has finished in one fourth place of the World Squash Team Open, in 1979.

== Current team ==
- Samantha Cornett
- Danielle Letourneau
- Hollie Naughton
- Nikki Todd

== Results ==
=== World Team Squash Championships ===
Year	Result	Position	W	L
(England) Birmingham 1979	Group Stage	4th	2	2
(Canada) Toronto 1981	Quarter Final	7th	3	3
(Australia) Perth 1983	Group Stage	8th	1	3
(Republic of Ireland) Dublin 1985	Group Stage	5th	4	3
(New Zealand) Auckland 1987	Group Stage	5th	6	2
(Netherlands) Warmond 1989	Quarter Final	5th	3	3
(Australia) Sydney 1990	Group Stage	8th	5	2
(Canada) Vancouver 1992	Quarter Final	6th	2	4
(England) Guernsey 1994	Group Stage	12th	0	6
(Malaysia) Petaling Jaya 1996	Group Stage	9th	5	1
(Germany) Stuttgart 1998	Group Stage	10th	4	2
(England) Sheffield 2000	Quarter Final	7th	3	3
(Denmark) Odense 2002	Group Stage	9th	5	2
(Netherlands) Amsterdam 2004	Group Stage	9th	5	2
(Canada) Edmonton 2006	Group Stage	13th	3	3
(Egypt) Cairo 2008	Group Stage	9th	5	2
(New Zealand) Palmerston North 2010	Group Stage	13th	2	4
(France) Nîmes 2012	Round of 16	12th	2	4
(Canada) Niagara-on-the-Lake 2014	Group Stage	11th	4	3
(France) Issy-les-Moulineaux 2016	Group Stage	10th	3	3
Total	20/20	0 Title	67	57

== See also ==
- Squash Canada
- World Team Squash Championships
- Canada men's national squash team
