= 2006 World University Squash Championship =

World University 2006
- 5th FISU World University Squash Championship
- Location: Szeged, Hungary
- Website www.squashsite.co.uk/universities_2006.htm

The 2006 World University Squash Championship is the edition of the 2006's World University Squash, which serves as the individual world squash championship for students. The event will take place in Szeged, Hungary, from 28 August to 2 September.

== Draw and results ==
Restricted from the quarter final

=== Men's Single ===
Quarter finals
1	(Hungary) Márk Krajcsák	9	9	9
5/8	(Malaysia) Mohd Nafzahizam Adnan	0	0	5
5/8	(France) Yann Perrin	4	4	9
3/4	(United States) Julian Illingworth	9	9	10
3/4	(United Kingdom) Chris Ryder	9	9	9
5/8	(France) Fabien Verseille	7	3	7
5/8	(United Kingdom) Jonathan Harford	0	7	9	9
2	(United Kingdom) Joel Hinds	9	9	1	9

Semi finals
1	(Hungary) Márk Krajcsák	9	9	9
3/4	(United States) Julian Illingworth	0	7	1
3/4	(United Kingdom) Chris Ryder	9	9	9
2	(United Kingdom) Joel Hinds	6	1	0

Final
1	(Hungary) Márk Krajcsák	9	8	1	4
3/4	(United Kingdom) Chris Ryder	7	10	9	9

=== Women's Single ===
Quarter finals
1	(Canada) Katie Patrick	9	9	9
(Switzerland) Olivia Hauser	1	3	0
(Hong Kong) Lau Siu Ying	3	4	10	4
(Germany) Kathrin Rohrmuller	9	9	8	9
3/4	(United Kingdom) Lauren Siddall	9	9	10
(United Kingdom) Emma Beddoes	4	4	9
(South Africa) Siyoli Lusaseni	1	6	9	3
2	(Malaysia) Lim Yoke Wah	9	9	5	9

Semi finals
1	(Canada) Katie Patrick	1	3	9	4
(Germany) Kathrin Rohrmuller	9	9	6	9
3/4	(United Kingdom) Lauren Siddall	9	7	9	4
2	(Malaysia) Lim Yoke Wah	10	9	2	9

Final
(Germany) Kathrin Rohrmuller	9	9	8	9	2
2	(Malaysia) Lim Yoke Wah	6	1	10	10	9

=== Team Event ===
Semi finals
1	(United Kingdom) Great Britain	3
5/8	South Africa	0
5/8	United States	1
2	France	2

Final
1	(United Kingdom) Great Britain	2
2	France	1

== See also ==
- World University Squash Championships
- World Squash Federation
