= 2019 Men's World Team Squash Championships =

Men's World Team 2019
- 26th WSF World Men's Team Championship
- Location: Washington, D.C., United States
- Venue: Squash On Fire
- Date: 15 – 21 December
- Website worldteamsquashdc.com

Results
- Champions: Egypt
- Runners-up: England
- Third place: Wales, France (shared)

The 2019 Men's World Team Squash Championships was the 26th edition of world men's team championship for squash players. The event was held at Squash On Fire in Washington, D.C., United States, from 15 to 21 December 2019. The tournament was organized by U.S. Squash sanctioned by the World Squash Federation. Egypt won the team gold medal after defeating England 2-0 in the final.

== Participating teams ==
A total of 23 teams competed from all the five confederations.

| Africa (SFA) | America (FPS) | Asia (ASF) | Europe (ESF) | Oceania (OSF) |
| Egypt (Title holder); Nigeria; South Africa | Argentina; Canada; Colombia; Jamaica; United States (Hosts country) | Hong Kong; Kuwait; Malaysia; Singapore; South Korea | England; France; Germany; Ireland; Scotland; Spain; Switzerland; Wales | Australia; New Zealand |

== Seeds ==
The seeds were announced on 2 December 2019.

1. Egypt
2. England
3. France
4. New Zealand
5. Germany
6. Hong Kong
7. Australia
8. Spain

== Group stage ==
=== Pool A ===
| Pos. | Team | Players | TP | TW | TL | MW | ML | GW | GL | PW | PL | Pts |
|---|---|---|---|---|---|---|---|---|---|---|---|---|
| 1 | Egypt | Ali Farag, Tarek Momen, Karim Abdel Gawad, Mohamed Abouelghar | 2 | 2 | 0 | 6 | 0 | 18 | 3 | 227 | 147 | 4 |
| 2 | Switzerland | Dimitri Steinmann, Reiko Peter, Robin Gadola, Cedric Kuchen | 2 | 1 | 1 | 2 | 4 | 8 | 13 | 171 | 204 | 2 |
| 3 | United States | Todd Harrity, Chris Hanson, Andrew Douglas, Christopher Gordon | 2 | 0 | 2 | 1 | 5 | 6 | 16 | 176 | 223 | 0 |

- Egypt vs. United States

Egypt
3

Squash On Fire, Court 1
15 December 2019

United States
0

| | | | 1 | 2 | 3 | 4 | 5 |
|---|---|---|---|---|---|---|---|
| 1 | (Egypt) (United States) | Tarek Momen; Chris Hanson | 11; 2 | 11; 9 | 11; 8 |
| 2 | (Egypt) (United States) | Ali Farag; Todd Harrity | 11; 6 | 11; 7 | 10; 12 | 11; 4 |
| 3 | (Egypt) (United States) | Karim Abdel Gawad; Andrew Douglas | 8; 11 | 11; 9 | 11; 8 | 11; 6 |

- Egypt vs. Switzerland

Egypt
3

Squash On Fire, Court 8
16 December 2019

Switzerland
0

| | | | 1 | 2 | 3 | 4 | 5 |
|---|---|---|---|---|---|---|---|
| 1 | (Egypt) (Switzerland) | Mohamed Abouelghar; Cedric Kuchen | 11; 8 | 11; 0 | 11; 4 |
| 2 | (Egypt) (Switzerland) | Tarek Momen; Robin Gadola | 11; 6 | 11; 7 | 11; 3 |
| 3 | (Egypt) (Switzerland) | Ali Farag; Dimitri Steinmann | 9; 11 | 11; 8 | 11; 7 | 13; 11 |

- United States vs. Switzerland

United States
1

Squash On Fire, Court 1
17 December 2019

Switzerland
2

| | | | 1 | 2 | 3 | 4 | 5 |
|---|---|---|---|---|---|---|---|
| 1 | (United States) (Switzerland) | Todd Harrity; Dimitri Steinmann | 5; 11 | 11; 5 | 5; 11 | 5; 11 |
| 2 | (United States) (Switzerland) | Andrew Douglas; Robin Gadola | 11; 8 | 5; 11 | 11; 6 | 11; 6 |
| 3 | (United States) (Switzerland) | Chris Hanson; Reiko Peter | 13; 15 | 9; 11 | 8; 11 |

=== Pool B ===
| Pos. | Team | Players | TP | TW | TL | MW | ML | GW | GL | PW | PL | Pts |
|---|---|---|---|---|---|---|---|---|---|---|---|---|
| 1 | England | Adrian Waller, James Willstrop, Daryl Selby, Declan James | 3 | 3 | 0 | 9 | 0 | 27 | 5 | 342 | 229 | 6 |
| 2 | Wales | Joel Makin, Peter Creed, Emyr Evans, Owain Taylor | 3 | 2 | 1 | 8 | 1 | 18 | 13 | 301 | 262 | 4 |
| 3 | Canada | Shawn Delierre, Michael McCue, Nick Sachvie, David Baillargeon | 3 | 1 | 2 | 7 | 2 | 14 | 17 | 271 | 289 | 2 |
| 4 | Nigeria | Babatunde Ajagbe, Sodiq Taiwo, Adewale Amao, Ehimen Ehalen | 3 | 0 | 3 | 0 | 9 | 3 | 27 | 196 | 330 | 0 |

- England vs. Canada

England
3

Squash On Fire, Court 1
15 December 2019

Canada
0

| | | | 1 | 2 | 3 | 4 | 5 |
|---|---|---|---|---|---|---|---|
| 1 | (England) (Canada) | Daryl Selby; Nick Sachvie | 11; 3 | 11; 8 | 11; 4 |
| 2 | (England) (Canada) | James Willstrop; Michael McCue | 11; 8 | 11; 5 | 2; 11 | 11; 7 |
| 3 | (England) (Canada) | Declan James; David Baillargeon | 11; 8 | 10; 12 | 11; 6 | 11; 6 |

- Wales vs. Nigeria

Wales
3

Squash On Fire, Court 7
15 December 2019

Nigeria
0

| | | | 1 | 2 | 3 | 4 | 5 |
|---|---|---|---|---|---|---|---|
| 1 | (Wales) (Nigeria) | Peter Creed; Sodiq Taiwo | 11; 5 | 11; 3 | 11; 5 |
| 2 | (Wales) (Nigeria) | Joel Makin; Babatunde Ajagbe | 11; 5 | 11; 8 | 11; 2 |
| 3 | (Wales) (Nigeria) | Emyr Evans; Adewale Amao | 11; 13 | 11; 6 | 11; 9 | 11; 2 |

- England vs. Wales

England
3

Squash On Fire, Court 8
16 December 2019

Wales
0

| | | | 1 | 2 | 3 | 4 | 5 |
|---|---|---|---|---|---|---|---|
| 1 | (England) (Wales) | Daryl Selby; Owain Taylor | 11; 6 | 11; 7 | 13; 11 |
| 2 | (England) (Wales) | James Willstrop; Peter Creed | 11; 5 | 11; 7 | 9; 11 | 9; 11 | 11; 4 |
| 3 | (England) (Wales) | Adrian Waller; Joel Makin | 11; 9 | 11; 9 | 9; 11 | 11; 8 |

- Canada vs. Nigeria

Canada
3

Squash On Fire, Court 6
16 December 2019

Nigeria
0

| | | | 1 | 2 | 3 | 4 | 5 |
|---|---|---|---|---|---|---|---|
| 1 | (Canada) (Nigeria) | David Baillargeon; Adewale Amao | 11; 9 | 12; 10 | 11; 3 |
| 2 | (Canada) (Nigeria) | Nick Sachvie; Sodiq Taiwo | 11; 7 | 11; 2 | 11; 7 |
| 3 | (Canada) (Nigeria) | Shawn Delierre; Babatunde Ajagbe | 14; 12 | 6; 11 | 8; 11 | 11; 5 | 11; 9 |

- England vs. Nigeria

England
3

Squash On Fire, Court 8
17 December 2019

Nigeria
0

| | | | 1 | 2 | 3 | 4 | 5 |
|---|---|---|---|---|---|---|---|
| 1 | (England) (Nigeria) | Adrian Waller; Babatunde Ajagbe | 11; 7 | 11; 5 | 12; 10 |
| 2 | (England) (Nigeria) | Declan James; Adewale Amao | 11; 2 | 11; 3 | 11; 1 |
| 3 | (England) (Nigeria) | James Wilstrop; Sodiq Taiwo | 14; 12 | 11; 7 | 11; 5 |

- Wales vs. Canada

Wales
2

Squash On Fire, Court 1
17 December 2019

Canada
1

| | | | 1 | 2 | 3 | 4 | 5 |
|---|---|---|---|---|---|---|---|
| 1 | (Wales) (Canada) | Joel Makin; Shawn Delierre | 11; 9 | 11; 1 | 11; 6 |
| 2 | (Wales) (Canada) | Emyr Evans; Nick Sachvie | 11; 7 | 17; 15 | 11; 4 |
| 3 | (Wales) (Canada) | Peter Creed; Michael McCue | 5; 11 | 5; 11 | 10; 12 |

=== Pool C ===
| Pos. | Team | Players | TP | TW | TL | MW | ML | GW | GL | PW | PL | Pts |
|---|---|---|---|---|---|---|---|---|---|---|---|---|
| 1 | France | Grégoire Marche, Grégory Gaultier, Mathieu Castagnet, Baptiste Masotti | 3 | 3 | 0 | 9 | 0 | 27 | 1 | 304 | 147 | 6 |
| 2 | Malaysia | Ng Eain Yow, Ivan Yuen, Mohd Syafiq Kamal, Addeen Idrakie | 3 | 2 | 1 | 5 | 4 | 18 | 14 | 300 | 281 | 4 |
| 3 | Colombia | Miguel Ángel Rodríguez, Juan Camilo Vargas, Ronald Palomino, Erick Herrera | 3 | 1 | 2 | 4 | 5 | 14 | 22 | 301 | 365 | 2 |
| 4 | South Korea | Ko Young-jo, Lee Se-hyun, Woo Chang-wook, Hwang Joong-won | 3 | 0 | 3 | 0 | 9 | 5 | 27 | 225 | 337 | 0 |

- France vs. Colombia

France
3

Squash On Fire, Court
15 December 2019

Colombia
0

| | | | 1 | 2 | 3 | 4 | 5 |
|---|---|---|---|---|---|---|---|
| 1 | (France) (Colombia) | Grégory Gaultier; Ronald Palomino | 11; 1 | 11; 5 | 11; 2 |
| 2 | (France) (Colombia) | Grégoire Marche; Juan Camilo Vargas | 11; 6 | 11; 2 | 11; 7 |
| 3 | (France) (Colombia) | Baptiste Masotti; Erick Herrera | 11; 5 | 11; 6 | 11; 3 |

- Malaysia vs. South Korea

Malaysia
3

Squash On Fire, Court
15 December 2019

South Korea
0

| | | | 1 | 2 | 3 | 4 | 5 |
|---|---|---|---|---|---|---|---|
| 1 | (Malaysia) (South Korea) | Ivan Yuen; Woo Chang-wook | 11; 3 | 11; 2 | 11; 7 |
| 2 | (Malaysia) (South Korea) | Ng Eain Yow; Ko Young-jo | 11; 9 | 11; 2 | 11; 5 |
| 3 | (Malaysia) (South Korea) | Mohd Syafiq Kamal; Hwang Joong-won | 11; 9 | 11; 7 | 11; 6 |

- France vs. Malaysia

France
3

Squash On Fire, Court
16 December 2019

Malaysia
0

| | | | 1 | 2 | 3 | 4 | 5 |
|---|---|---|---|---|---|---|---|
| 1 | (France) (Malaysia) | Mathieu Castagnet; Addeen Idrakie | 11; 4 | 11; 2 | 11; 4 |
| 2 | (France) (Malaysia) | Grégory Gaultier; Ivan Yuen | 11; 8 | 11; 7 | 11; 6 |
| 3 | (France) (Malaysia) | Grégoire Marche; Ng Eain Yow | 11; 8 | 6; 11 | 11; 1 | 11; 7 |

- Colombia vs. South Korea

Colombia
3

Squash On Fire, Court
16 December 2019

South Korea
0

| | | | 1 | 2 | 3 | 4 | 5 |
|---|---|---|---|---|---|---|---|
| 1 | (Colombia) (South Korea) | Erick Herrera; Hwang Joong-won | 7; 11 | 11; 3 | 9; 11 | 11; 8 | 11; 6 |
| 2 | (Colombia) (South Korea) | Ronald Palomino; Lee Se-hyun | 7; 11 | 5; 11 | 11; 7 | 14; 12 | 12; 10 |
| 3 | (Colombia) (South Korea) | Juan Camilo Vargas; Ko Young-jo | 7; 11 | 11; 6 | 11; 9 | 11; 7 |

- France vs. South Korea

France
3

Squash On Fire, Court
17 December 2019

South Korea
0

| | | | 1 | 2 | 3 | 4 | 5 |
|---|---|---|---|---|---|---|---|
| 1 | (France) (South Korea) | Grégoire Marche; Ko Young-jo | 12; 10 | 11; 1 | 11; 7 |
| 2 | (France) (South Korea) | Baptiste Masotti; Hwang Joong-won | 11; 4 | 11; 9 | 11; 5 |
| 3 | (France) (South Korea) | Mathieu Castagnet; Woo Chang-wook | 11; 3 | 11; 4 | 11; 9 |

- Malaysia vs. Colombia

Malaysia
2

Squash On Fire, Court
17 December 2019

Colombia
1

| | | | 1 | 2 | 3 | 4 | 5 |
|---|---|---|---|---|---|---|---|
| 1 | (Malaysia) (Colombia) | Ng Eain Yow; Miguel Ángel Rodríguez | 11; 9 | 13; 11 | 13; 15 | 11; 8 |
| 2 | (Malaysia) (Colombia) | Mohd Syafiq Kamal; Ronald Palomino | 11; 6 | 13; 15 | 11; 8 | 11; 9 |
| 3 | (Malaysia) (Colombia) | Ivan Yuen; Juan Camilo Vargas | 9; 11 | 11; 7 | 8; 11 | 11; 4 | 10; 12 |

=== Pool D ===
| Pos. | Team | Players | TP | TW | TL | MW | ML | GW | GL | PW | PL | Pts |
|---|---|---|---|---|---|---|---|---|---|---|---|---|
| 1 | Scotland | Greg Lobban, Alan Clyne, Rory Stewart, Stuart George | 3 | 3 | 0 | 8 | 1 | 24 | 7 | 315 | 193 | 6 |
| 2 | New Zealand | Paul Coll, Campbell Grayson, Evan Williams, Lwamba Chileshe | 3 | 2 | 1 | 7 | 2 | 24 | 6 | 296 | 203 | 4 |
| 3 | Ireland | Sean Conroy, Arthur Gaskin, Oisin Logan, Steve Richardson | 3 | 1 | 2 | 3 | 6 | 10 | 19 | 226 | 263 | 2 |
| 4 | Singapore | Samuel Kang, Chua Man Chin, Chua Man Tong, Brandon Tan | 3 | 0 | 3 | 0 | 9 | 1 | 27 | 133 | 311 | 0 |

- New Zealand vs. Ireland

New Zealand
3

Squash On Fire, Court 8
15 December 2019

Ireland
0

| | | | 1 | 2 | 3 | 4 | 5 |
|---|---|---|---|---|---|---|---|
| 1 | (New Zealand) (Republic of Ireland) | Campbell Grayson; Oisin Logan | 11; 8 | 11; 5 | 11; 5 |
| 2 | (New Zealand) (Republic of Ireland) | Paul Coll; Arthur Gaskin | 11; 7 | 11; 7 | 11; 6 |
| 3 | (New Zealand) (Republic of Ireland) | Evan Williams; Steve Richardson | 11; 7 | 11; 7 | 11; 5 |

- Scotland vs. Singapore

Scotland
3

Squash On Fire, Court 7
15 December 2019

Singapore
0

| | | | 1 | 2 | 3 | 4 | 5 |
|---|---|---|---|---|---|---|---|
| 1 | (Scotland) (Singapore) | Alan Clyne; Chua Man Chin | 11; 5 | 11; 2 | 11; 1 |
| 2 | (Scotland) (Singapore) | Greg Lobban; Samuel Kang | 11; 6 | 11; 8 | 11; 6 |
| 3 | (Scotland) (Singapore) | Rory Stewart; Brandon Tan | 11; 1 | 11; 4 | 11; 6 |

- New Zealand vs. Scotland

New Zealand
1

Squash On Fire, Court 7
16 December 2019

Scotland
2

| | | | 1 | 2 | 3 | 4 | 5 |
|---|---|---|---|---|---|---|---|
| 1 | (New Zealand) (Scotland) | Evan Williams; Rory Stewart | 3; 11 | 12; 10 | 10; 12 | 1; 11 |
| 2 | (New Zealand) (Scotland) | Campbell Grayson; Alan Clyne | 8; 11 | 4; 11 | 11; 7 | 12; 10 | 4; 11 |
| 3 | (New Zealand) (Scotland) | Paul Coll; Greg Lobban | 11; 5 | 11; 4 | 11; 6 |

- Ireland vs. Singapore

Ireland
3

Squash On Fire, Court 6
16 December 2019

Singapore
0

| | | | 1 | 2 | 3 | 4 | 5 |
|---|---|---|---|---|---|---|---|
| 1 | (Republic of Ireland) (Singapore) | Oisin Logan; Chua Man Tong | 11; 3 | 11; 4 | 11; 2 |
| 2 | (Republic of Ireland) (Singapore) | Arthur Gaskin; Chua Man Chin | 11; 2 | 15; 13 | 11; 4 |
| 3 | (Republic of Ireland) (Singapore) | Sean Conroy; Samuel Kang | 11; 8 | 10; 12 | 11; 5 | 11; 4 |

- New Zealand vs. Singapore

New Zealand
3

Squash On Fire, Court 1
17 December 2019

Singapore
0

| | | | 1 | 2 | 3 | 4 | 5 |
|---|---|---|---|---|---|---|---|
| 1 | (New Zealand) (Singapore) | Paul Coll; Samuel Kang | 11; 6 | 11; 5 | 11; 2 |
| 2 | (New Zealand) (Singapore) | Lwamba Chileshe; Brandon Tan | 11; 7 | 11; 6 | 11; 0 |
| 3 | (New Zealand) (Singapore) | Campbell Grayson; Chua Man Tong | 11; 3 | 11; 2 | 11; 6 |

- Scotland vs. Ireland

Scotland
3

Squash On Fire, Court 8
17 December 2019

Ireland
0

| | | | 1 | 2 | 3 | 4 | 5 |
|---|---|---|---|---|---|---|---|
| 1 | (Scotland) (Republic of Ireland) | Greg Lobban; Sean Conroy | 11; 7 | 11; 5 | 11; 6 |
| 2 | (Scotland) (Republic of Ireland) | Rory Stewart; Steve Richardson | 11; 8 | 11; 4 | 8; 11 | 11; 2 |
| 3 | (Scotland) (Republic of Ireland) | Alan Clyne; Oisin Logan | 11; 5 | 11; 5 | 11; 3 |

=== Pool E ===
| Pos. | Team | Players | TP | TW | TL | MW | ML | GW | GL | PW | PL | Pts |
|---|---|---|---|---|---|---|---|---|---|---|---|---|
| 1 | Spain | Borja Golán, Iker Pajares Bernabeu, Edmon López, Carlos Cornes Ribadas | 3 | 3 | 0 | 8 | 1 | 23 | 6 | 302 | 202 | 6 |
| 2 | Germany | Simon Rösner, Raphael Kandra, Valentin Rapp, Rudi Rohrmüller | 3 | 2 | 1 | 6 | 3 | 21 | 8 | 283 | 207 | 4 |
| 3 | Argentina | Robertino Pezzota, Leandro Romiglio, Gonzalo Miranda, Jeremias Azaña | 3 | 1 | 2 | 3 | 6 | 12 | 20 | 258 | 299 | 2 |
| 4 | South Africa | Jean-Pierre Brits, Christo Potgieter, Gary Wheadon, Dylan Groenewald | 3 | 0 | 3 | 1 | 8 | 4 | 26 | 191 | 326 | 0 |

- Germany vs. Argentina

Germany
2

Squash On Fire, Court 7
15 December 2019

Argentina
1

| | | | 1 | 2 | 3 | 4 | 5 |
|---|---|---|---|---|---|---|---|
| 1 | (Germany) (Argentina) | Valentin Rapp; Leandro Romiglio | 11; 4 | 4; 11 | 5; 11 | 9; 11 |
| 2 | (Germany) (Argentina) | Raphael Kandra; Robertino Pezzota | 11; 7 | 11; 7 | 11; 3 |
| 3 | (Germany) (Argentina) | Rudi Rohrmüller; Gonzalo Miranda | 11; 3 | 11; 5 | 11; 9 |

- Spain vs. South Africa

Spain
3

Squash On Fire, Court 8
15 December 2019

South Africa
0

| | | | 1 | 2 | 3 | 4 | 5 |
|---|---|---|---|---|---|---|---|
| 1 | (Spain) (South Africa) | Iker Pajares Bernabeu; Christo Potgieter | 11; 5 | 11; 5 | 11; 5 |
| 2 | (Spain) (South Africa) | Borja Golán; Jean-Pierre Brits | 11; 3 | 11; 9 | 11; 6 |
| 3 | (Spain) (South Africa) | Carlos Cornes Ribadas; Gary Wheadon | 11; 5 | 11; 3 | 13; 11 |

- Germany vs. Spain

Germany
1

Squash On Fire, Court 1
16 December 2019

Spain
2

| | | | 1 | 2 | 3 | 4 | 5 |
|---|---|---|---|---|---|---|---|---|
| 1 | (Germany) (Spain) | Rudi Rohrmüller; Carlos Cornes Ribadas | 11; 7 | 5; 11 | 4; 11 | 2; 4 | | retired |
| 2 | (Germany) (Spain) | Raphael Kandra; Iker Pajares Bernabeu | 8; 11 | 11; 9 | 8; 11 | 7; 11 |
| 3 | (Germany) (Spain) | Simon Rösner; Borja Golán | 11; 3 | 11; 6 | 11; 9 |

- Argentina vs. South Africa

Argentina
2

Squash On Fire, Court 7
16 December 2019

South Africa
1

| | | | 1 | 2 | 3 | 4 | 5 |
|---|---|---|---|---|---|---|---|
| 1 | (Argentina) (South Africa) | Gonzalo Miranda; Gary Wheadon | 12; 10 | 7; 11 | 11; 4 | 11; 9 |
| 2 | (Argentina) (South Africa) | Leandro Romiglio; Christo Potgieter | 11; 4 | 11; 8 | 11; 7 |
| 3 | (Argentina) (South Africa) | Robertino Pezzota; Jean-Pierre Brits | 11; 13 | 10; 12 | 11; 2 | 11; 5 | 9; 11 |

- Germany vs. South Africa

Germany
3

Squash On Fire, Court 7
17 December 2019

South Africa
0

| | | | 1 | 2 | 3 | 4 | 5 |
|---|---|---|---|---|---|---|---|
| 1 | (Germany) (South Africa) | Simon Rösner; Jean-Pierre Brits | 11; 1 | 11; 1 | 11; 4 |
| 2 | (Germany) (South Africa) | Valentin Rapp; Dylan Groenewald | 11; 6 | 11; 5 | 11; 6 |
| 3 | (Germany) (South Africa) | Raphael Kandra; Gary Wheadon | 11; 3 | 13; 11 | 11; 6 |

- Spain vs. Argentina

Spain
3

Squash On Fire, Court 6
17 December 2019

Argentina
0

| | | | 1 | 2 | 3 | 4 | 5 |
|---|---|---|---|---|---|---|---|
| 1 | (Spain) (Argentina) | Borja Golán; Robertino Pezzota | 11; 3 | 9; 11 | 11; 4 | 11; 5 |
| 2 | (Spain) (Argentina) | Carlos Cornes Ribadas; Jeremias Azaña | 11; 8 | 11; 8 | 11; 7 |
| 3 | (Spain) (Argentina) | Iker Pajares Bernabeu; Gonzalo Miranda | 11; 3 | 11; 5 | 11; 7 |

=== Pool F ===
| Pos. | Team | Players | TP | TW | TL | MW | ML | GW | GL | PW | PL | Pts |
|---|---|---|---|---|---|---|---|---|---|---|---|---|
| 1 | Hong Kong | Leo Au, Max Lee, Yip Tsz Fung, Henry Leung | 3 | 3 | 0 | 8 | 1 | 21 | 9 | 303 | 239 | 6 |
| 2 | Australia | Ryan Cuskelly, Cameron Pilley, Rex Hedrick, Zac Alexander | 3 | 2 | 1 | 6 | 3 | 19 | 7 | 267 | 172 | 4 |
| 3 | Kuwait | Ammar Al-Tamimi, Abdullah Al-Muzayen, Yousif Nizar Saleh, Ali Al-Ramezi | 3 | 1 | 2 | 3 | 6 | 13 | 17 | 253 | 273 | 2 |
| 4 | Jamaica | Christopher Binnie, Lewis Walters, Bruce Burrowes, Tahjia Lumley | 3 | 0 | 3 | 1 | 8 | 4 | 24 | 162 | 301 | 0 |

- Hong Kong vs. Jamaica

Hong Kong
3

Squash On Fire, Court 8
15 December 2019

Jamaica
0

| | | | 1 | 2 | 3 | 4 | 5 |
|---|---|---|---|---|---|---|---|
| 1 | (Hong Kong) (Jamaica) | Max Lee; Lewis Walters | 10; 12 | 11; 5 | 11; 2 | 11; 5 |
| 2 | (Hong Kong) (Jamaica) | Leo Au; Christopher Binnie | 11; 7 | 11; 3 | 11; 7 |
| 3 | (Hong Kong) (Jamaica) | Yip Tsz Fung; Bruce Burrowes | 11; 4 | 11; 5 | 11; 5 |

- Australia vs. Kuwait

Australia
2

Squash On Fire, Court 6
15 December 2019

Kuwait
1

| | | | 1 | 2 | 3 | 4 | 5 |
|---|---|---|---|---|---|---|---|
| 1 | (Australia) (Kuwait) | Cameron Pilley; Abdullah Al-Muzayen | 7; 11 | 6; 11 | 5; 11 |
| 2 | (Australia) (Kuwait) | Ryan Cuskelly; Ammar Al-Tamimi | 11; 7 | 11; 7 | 11; 4 |
| 3 | (Australia) (Kuwait) | Rex Hedrick; Yousif Nizar Saleh | 11; 2 | 11; 4 | 11; 3 |

- Hong Kong vs. Australia

Hong Kong
2

Squash On Fire, Court 1
16 December 2019

Australia
1

| | | | 1 | 2 | 3 | 4 | 5 |
|---|---|---|---|---|---|---|---|---|
| 1 | (Hong Kong) (Australia) | Yip Tsz Fung; Rex Hedrick | 11; 7 | 12; 10 | 14; 12 |
| 2 | (Hong Kong) (Australia) | Max Lee; Cameron Pilley | 3; 11 | 4; 11 | 3; 11 |
| 3 | (Hong Kong) (Australia) | Leo Au; Ryan Cuskelly | 10; 12 | 11; 9 | 1; 1 | | | retired |

- Jamaica vs. Kuwait

Jamaica
1

Squash On Fire, Court 7
16 December 2019

Kuwait
2

| | | | 1 | 2 | 3 | 4 | 5 |
|---|---|---|---|---|---|---|---|
| 1 | (Jamaica) (Kuwait) | Bruce Burrowes; Ali Al-Ramezi | 4; 11 | 0; 11 | 2; 11 |
| 2 | (Jamaica) (Kuwait) | Lewis Walters; Abdullah Al-Muzayen | 3; 11 | 7; 11 | 8; 11 |
| 3 | (Jamaica) (Kuwait) | Christopher Binnie; Ammar Al-Tamimi | 18; 16 | 11; 8 | 11; 3 |

- Hong Kong vs. Kuwait

Hong Kong
3

Squash On Fire, Court 8
17 December 2019

Kuwait
0

| | | | 1 | 2 | 3 | 4 | 5 |
|---|---|---|---|---|---|---|---|---|
| 1 | (Hong Kong) (Kuwait) | Leo Au; Ammar Al-Tamimi | 9; 11 | 11; 9 | 11; 4 | 11; 7 |
| 2 | (Hong Kong) (Kuwait) | Henry Leung; Ali Al-Ramezi | 11; 3 | 9; 11 | 11; 6 | 9; 11 | 11; 7 |
| 3 | (Hong Kong) (Kuwait) | Yip Tsz Fung; Abdullah Al-Muzayen | 9; 11 | 11; 6 | 11; 9 | 1; 5 | | retired |

- Australia vs. Jamaica

Australia
3

Squash On Fire, Court 7
17 December 2019

Jamaica
0

| | | | 1 | 2 | 3 | 4 | 5 |
|---|---|---|---|---|---|---|---|
| 1 | (Australia) (Jamaica) | Cameron Pilley; Lewis Walters | 11; 6 | 11; 4 | 11; 8 |
| 2 | (Australia) (Jamaica) | Zac Alexander; Tahjia Lumley | 11; 4 | 11; 7 | 11; 3 |
| 3 | (Australia) (Jamaica) | Rex Hendrix; Bruce Burrowes | 11; 3 | 11; 5 | 11; 3 |

== Second round ==
=== Thirteenth to twenty-third places ===
13th to 23rd places bracket

13-23 round of 16
20 | Singapore | 3 | 0 | 0
17 | Jamaica | 0 | 3 | 3
16 | Argentina | 3 | 3
23 | Nigeria | 1 | 2
19 | South Africa | 3 | 3
22 | South Korea | 0 | 2

13-20 quarterfinals
12 | United States | 3 | 3
17 | Jamaica | 0 | 0
13 | Colombia | 0 | 2
16 | Argentina | 3 | 3
21 | Kuwait | 3 | 3
18 | Ireland | 0 | 2
19 | South Africa | 1 | 3 | 0
14 | Canada | 3 | 0 | 3

13-16 semifinals
12 | United States | 3 | 1 | 3
16 | Argentina | 1 | 3 | 0
21 | Kuwait | 1 | 3 | 0
14 | Canada | 3 | 0 | 3

Thirteenth place playoff
12 | United States | 3 | 3
14 | Canada | 1 | 0
Fifteenth place playoff
16 | Argentina | 1 | 0
21 | Kuwait | 3 | 3

17th to 20th places bracket

17-20 semifinals
17 | Jamaica | 3 | 3
13 | Colombia | 0 | 1
18 | Ireland | 3 | 3
19 | South Africa | 2 | 0

Seventeenth place playoff
17 | Jamaica | 0 | 2
18 | Ireland | 3 | 3
Nineteenth place playoff
13 | Colombia | 1 | 3 | 1
19 | South Africa | 3 | 0 | 3

21st to 23rd places round-robin table

| Pos. | Team | TP | TW | TL | MW | ML | GW | GL | PW | PL | Pts | (Nigeria) | (South Korea) | (Singapore) |
| 21 | Nigeria [23] | 2 | 2 | 0 | 4 | 2 | 12 | 10 | 206 | 197 | 4 | — | 2–1 | 2–1 |
| 22 | South Korea [22] | 2 | 1 | 1 | 3 | 3 | 12 | 11 | 205 | 214 | 2 | | — | 2–1 |
| 23 | Singapore [20] | 2 | 0 | 2 | 2 | 4 | 9 | 12 | 182 | 182 | 0 | | | — |

=== First to twelfth places ===
1st to 12th places bracket

Round of 16
10 | Malaysia | 0 | 0
5 | Germany | 3 | 3
6 | Hong Kong | 2 | 0
11 | Wales | 3 | 3
15 | Switzerland | 1 | 2
8 | Spain | 3 | 3
7 | Australia | 3 | 0 | 1
4 | New Zealand | 0 | 3 | 3

Quarterfinals
1 | Egypt | 3 | 2 | 3
5 | Germany | 2 | 3 | 0
11 | Wales | 3 | 3
9 | Scotland | 0 | 0
3 | France | 1 | 3 | 3
8 | Spain | 3 | 0 | 0
4 | New Zealand | 0 | 3 | 1
2 | England | 3 | 0 | 3

Semifinals
1 | Egypt | 2 | 3 | 3
11 | Wales | 3 | 0 | 1
3 | France | 2 | 3 | 0
2 | England | 3 | 0 | 3

Gold medal playoff
1 | Egypt | 3 | 3
2 | England | 2 | 1

5th to 8th places bracket

5-8 semifinals
5 | Germany | 3 | 3
9 | Scotland | 0 | 1
8 | Spain | 1 | 1
4 | New Zealand | 3 | 3

Fifth place playoff
5 | Germany | 0 | 2
4 | New Zealand | 3 | 3
Seventh place playoff
9 | Scotland | 2 | 3 | 1
8 | Spain | 3 | 1 | 0^{r}

9th to 12th places bracket

9-12 semifinals
10 | Malaysia | 3 | 3
6 | Hong Kong | 1 | 1
15 | Switzerland | 3 | 2 | 0
7 | Australia | 0 | 3 | 3

Ninth place playoff
10 | Malaysia | 3 | 3
7 | Australia | 2 | 0
Eleventh place playoff
6 | Hong Kong | 3 | 3
15 | Switzerland | 0 | 2

==== Round of 16 ====
Malaysia
0

Squash On Fire, Court 1
18 December 2019

Germany
2

| | | | 1 | 2 | 3 | 4 | 5 |
|---|---|---|---|---|---|---|---|---|
| 1 | (Malaysia) (Germany) | Mohd Syafiq Kamal; Valentin Rapp | 7; 11 | 9; 11 | 10; 12 |
| 2 | (Malaysia) (Germany) | Ng Eain Yow; Simon Rösner | 7; 11 | 6; 11 | 5; 11 |
| 3 | (Malaysia) (Germany) | Ivan Yuen; Raphael Kandra | | | | | | not played |

Hong Kong
0

Squash On Fire, Court 1
18 December 2019

Wales
2

| | | | 1 | 2 | 3 | 4 | 5 |
|---|---|---|---|---|---|---|---|---|
| 1 | (Hong Kong) (Wales) | Henry Leung; Emyr Evans | 8; 11 | 13; 11 | 14; 12 | 7; 11 | 7; 11 |
| 2 | (Hong Kong) (Wales) | Leo Au; Joel Makin | 11; 13 | 4; 11 | 8; 11 |
| 3 | (Hong Kong) (Wales) | Yip Tsz Fung; Peter Creed | | | | | | not played |

Switzerland
0

Squash On Fire, Court 1
18 December 2019

Spain
2

| | | | 1 | 2 | 3 | 4 | 5 |
|---|---|---|---|---|---|---|---|---|
| 1 | (Switzerland) (Spain) | Cedric Kuchen; Carlos Cornes Ribadas | 6; 11 | 11; 9 | 8; 11 | 2; 11 |
| 2 | (Switzerland) (Spain) | Dimitri Steinmann; Borja Golán | 11; 7 | 6; 11 | 12; 10 | 6; 11 | 2; 11 |
| 3 | (Switzerland) (Spain) | Reiko Peter; Iker Pajares Bernabeu | | | | | | not played |

Australia
1

Squash On Fire, Court 8
18 December 2019

New Zealand
2

| | | | 1 | 2 | 3 | 4 | 5 |
|---|---|---|---|---|---|---|---|
| 1 | (Australia) (New Zealand) | Rex Hedrick; Evan Williams | 16; 14 | 11; 6 | 11; 2 |
| 2 | (Australia) (New Zealand) | Ryan Cuskelly; Paul Coll | 2; 11 | 5; 11 | 5; 11 |
| 3 | (Australia) (New Zealand) | Cameron Pilley; Campbell Grayson | 9; 11 | 6; 11 | 11; 7 | 9; 11 |

==== Quarterfinals ====
Egypt
2

Squash On Fire, Court 1
19 December 2019

Germany
1

| | | | 1 | 2 | 3 | 4 | 5 |
|---|---|---|---|---|---|---|---|
| 1 | (Egypt) (Germany) | Karim Abdel Gawad; Raphael Kandra | 11; 8 | 11; 5 | 9; 11 | 8; 11 | 11; 4 |
| 2 | (Egypt) (Germany) | Ali Farag; Simon Rösner | 6; 11 | 8; 11 | 11; 9 | 11; 5 | 8; 11 |
| 3 | (Egypt) (Germany) | Mohamed Abouelghar; Valentin Rapp | 11; 3 | 11; 7 | 11; 7 |

Wales
2

Squash On Fire, Court 1
19 December 2019

Scotland
0

| | | | 1 | 2 | 3 | 4 | 5 |
|---|---|---|---|---|---|---|---|---|
| 1 | (Wales) (Scotland) | Peter Creed; Alan Clyne | 11; 9 | 11; 4 | 11; 8 |
| 2 | (Wales) (Scotland) | Joel Makin; Greg Lobban | 15; 13 | 11; 8 | 11; 5 |
| 3 | (Wales) (Scotland) | Emyr Evans; Rory Stewart | | | | | | not played |

France
2

Squash On Fire, Court 8
19 December 2019

Spain
1

| | | | 1 | 2 | 3 | 4 | 5 |
|---|---|---|---|---|---|---|---|
| 1 | (France) (Spain) | Grégory Gaultier; Iker Pajares Bernabeu | 11; 13 | 7; 11 | 14; 12 | 10; 12 |
| 2 | (France) (Spain) | Grégoire Marche; Borja Golán | 11; 4 | 11; 7 | 11; 5 |
| 3 | (France) (Spain) | Mathieu Castagnet; Carlos Cornes Ribadas | 11; 2 | 11; 4 | 11; 3 |

New Zealand
1

Squash On Fire, Court 1
19 December 2019

England
2

| | | | 1 | 2 | 3 | 4 | 5 |
|---|---|---|---|---|---|---|---|
| 1 | (New Zealand) (England) | Campbell Grayson; James Willstrop | 10; 12 | 6; 11 | 5; 11 |
| 2 | (New Zealand) (England) | Paul Coll; Adrian Waller | 11; 4 | 11; 9 | 11; 5 |
| 3 | (New Zealand) (England) | Evan Williams; Daryl Selby | 11; 8 | 12; 14 | 9; 11 | 8; 11 |

==== Semifinals ====
Egypt
2

Squash On Fire, Court 1
20 December 2019

Wales
1

| | | | 1 | 2 | 3 | 4 | 5 |
|---|---|---|---|---|---|---|---|
| 1 | (Egypt) (Wales) | Tarek Momen; Joel Makin | 9; 11 | 15; 13 | 2; 11 | 11; 4 | 9; 11 |
| 2 | (Egypt) (Wales) | Karim Abdel Gawad; Peter Creed | 12; 10 | 11; 3 | 11; 7 |
| 3 | (Egypt) (Wales) | Mohamed Abouelghar; Emyr Evans | 11; 7 | 11; 7 | 8; 11 | 11; 7 |

France
1

Squash On Fire, Court 1
20 December 2019

England
2

| | | | 1 | 2 | 3 | 4 | 5 |
|---|---|---|---|---|---|---|---|
| 1 | (France) (England) | Grégoire Marche; Adrian Waller | 9; 11 | 5; 11 | 11; 8 | 11; 4 | 6; 11 |
| 2 | (France) (England) | Grégory Gaultier; James Willstrop | 11; 8 | 11; 5 | 11; 5 |
| 3 | (France) (England) | Mathieu Castagnet; Declan James | 6; 11 | 6; 11 | 7; 11 |

==== Final ====
Egypt
2

Squash On Fire, Court 1
21 December 2019

England
0

| | | | 1 | 2 | 3 | 4 | 5 |
|---|---|---|---|---|---|---|---|---|
| 1 | (Egypt) (England) | Karim Abdel Gawad; Declan James | 9; 11 | 11; 4 | 8; 11 | 11; 9 | 12; 10 |
| 2 | (Egypt) (England) | Ali Farag; Adrian Waller | 11; 6 | 11; 6 | 12; 14 | 11; 4 |
| 3 | (Egypt) (England) | Tarek Momen; James Willstrop | | | | | | not played |

== Final standings ==
| Position | Team |
|---|---|
| 1st place, gold medalist(s) | Egypt |
| 2nd place, silver medalist(s) | England |
| 3rd place, bronze medalist(s) | Wales |
| 3rd place, bronze medalist(s) | France |
| 5th | New Zealand |
| 6th | Germany |
| 7th | Scotland |
| 8th | Spain |
| 9th | Malaysia |
| 10th | Australia |

| Position | Team |
|---|---|
| 11th | Hong Kong |
| 12th | Switzerland |
| 13th | United States |
| 14th | Canada |
| 15th | Kuwait |
| 16th | Argentina |
| 17th | Ireland |
| 18th | Jamaica |
| 19th | South Africa |
| 20th | Colombia |

| Position | Team |
|---|---|
| 21st | Nigeria |
| 22nd | South Korea |
| 23rd | Singapore |
