= 2006 Women's British Open Squash Championship =

British Open Squash Championships
- 78th Women's British Open Championships

Details
- Location: Nottingham, England
- Venue: University of Nottingham

The 2006 Women's Dunlop British Open Squash Championships was held at the University of Nottingham in Nottingham from 12–18 September 2006. The event was won for the second consecutive year by Nicol David who defeated Rachael Grinham in the final.

== Seeds ==
1. (Malaysia) Nicol David
2. (Netherlands) Vanessa Atkinson
3. (Australia) Rachael Grinham
4. (Australia) Natalie Grinham
5. (England) Vicky Botwright
6. (England) Jenny Duncalf
7. (England) Tania Bailey
8. (Republic of Ireland) Madeline Perry

== Draw and results ==
=== First qualifying round ===
Player One	Player Two	Score
(Wales) Tegwen Malik	(France) Célia Allamargot	9–0 9–1 9–3
(England) Dominique Lloyd-Walter	(England) Kirsty McPhee	9–3 9–2 9–1
(Italy) Manuela Manetta	(South Africa) Adel Weir	9–1 9–4 9–6
(England) Becky Botwright	(England) Harriet Ingham	9–0 9–0 9–0
(United States) Natalie Grainger	(Republic of Ireland) Aisling Blake	9–2 9–10 9–6 9–6
(England) Lauren Briggs	(England) Emma Beddoes	9–2 9–1 9–2
(France) Isabelle Stoehr	(Egypt) Amnah El Trabolsy	9–1 9–2 9–5
(Netherlands) Annelize Naudé	(England) Lauren Siddall	9–2 9–3 9–5
(England) Laura Hill	(England) Suzie Pierrepont	9–3 10–9 9–4
(Canada) Runa Reta	(England) Susannah King	9–4 9–4 9–6
(Malaysia) Tricia Chuah	(Germany) Daniela Schumann	9–5 9–2 9–3
(Denmark) Line Hansen	(England) Leonie Holt	9–3 5–9 10–9 9–4
(England) Georgina Stoker	(Republic of Ireland) Laura Mylotte	7–9 9–7 9–6 10–9
(France) Soraya Renai	(France) Camille Serme	9–4 9–7 9–5
(England) Jenna Gates	(Wales) Jenny Wright	9–6 9–7 9–2
(England) Sarah Kippax	(Netherlands) Milja Dorenbos	9–2 9–3 9–2

=== Second qualifying round ===
Player One	Player Two	Score
(Wales) Malik	(England) Hill	9–4 9–6 9–4
(England) Lloyd-Walter	(Canada) Reta	9–3 9–3 6–9 7–9 9–0
(Italy) Manetta	(Malaysia) Chuah	9–6 4–9 9–7 10–8
(England) Botwright B	(Denmark) Hansen	9–2 9–2 9–5
(United States) Grainger	(England) Stoker	9–5 9–3 9–4
(England) Briggs	(France) Renai	9–3 9–1 9–2
(France) Stoehr	(England) Gates	9–2 9–0 9–3
(Netherlands) Naudé	(England) Kippax	9–1 9–2 8–10 9–7

=== Final qualifying round ===
Player One	Player Two	Score
(United States) Grainger	(Wales) Malik	w/o
(England) Briggs	(England) Lloyd-Walter	8–10 9–6 9–2 9–2
(France) Stoehr	(Italy) Manetta	6–9 9–3 9–1 9–3
(Netherlands) Naudé	(England) Botwright B	9–5 9–1 9–3

=== First round ===
Player One	Player Two	Score
(Malaysia) Nicol David	(New Zealand) Shelley Kitchen	9–6 9–1 9–5
(Netherlands) Vanessa Atkinson	(England) Alison Waters	10–8 6–9 1–9 9–4 7–9
(Australia) Rachael Grinham	(England) Laura Lengthorn	5–9 9–2 4–9 10–9 9–4
(Australia) Natalie Grinham	(France) Isabelle Stoehr	9–1 9–1 9–5
(England) Vicky Botwright	(England) Lauren Briggs	9–6 9–2 9–3
(England) Jenny Duncalf	(United States) Natalie Grainger	3–9 5–9 0–9
(England) Tania Bailey	(Netherlands) Annelize Naudé	9–1 9–0 9–4
(Republic of Ireland) Madeline Perry	(Egypt) Engy Kheirallah	10–8 4–9 9–7 5–9 4–9

=== Quarter-finals ===
Player One	Player Two	Score
(Malaysia) David	(England) Botwright	9–4 9–0 9–0
(Australia) Grinham R	(United States) Grainger	9–2 9–1 9–1
(Australia) Grinham N	(England) Bailey	9–4 9–7 7–9 9–1
(Egypt) Kheirallah	(England) Waters	8–10 9–7 9–2 3–9 9–6

=== Semi-finals ===
Player One	Player Two	Score
(Malaysia) David	(Australia) Grinham N	9–3 9–3 9–5
(Australia) Grinham R	(Egypt) Kheirallah	9–7 9–0 9–2

=== Final ===
Player One	Player Two	Score
(Malaysia) David	(Australia) Grinham R	9–4 9–1 9–4

Preceded by 2005	British Open Squash Championships; England (Nottingham); 2006	Succeeded by 2007
