= World University Squash Championships =

International college sports competition

World University Championships
- Current season, competition or edition: 2026 World University Squash Championship
- Sport: Squash
- Founded: 1996
- Director: FISU; WSF
- President: (United Kingdom) Zena Wooldridge
- Continent: International
- Most recent champions: (India) Suraj Chand (2026) (Spain) Marta Domínguez (2026); Hong Kong (2026)

The World University Squash Championship is the official international college competition in the game of squash conducted by the World Squash Federation (WSF), which was first held in 1996 in Maastricht in Netherlands.

== Results ==
Final Host	Event	Medalists		
Final Host	Event	Gold	Silver	Bronze
1996 – Details
Maastricht; Netherlands	Men's Single	(Brazil) Paul Conolly	(Canada) Kelly Patrick	(France) Thierry Lincou
Maastricht; Netherlands	Women's Single	(Belgium) Kim Hannes	(United Kingdom) Kelly Buckley	(Germany) Sandy Suck
Maastricht; Netherlands	Team event	(United Kingdom) Great Britain	France	Germany
1998 – Details
Cardiff; United Kingdom	Men's Single	(France) Thierry Lincou	(France) Jean-Michel Arcucci	(United Kingdom) Greg Tippings
Cardiff; United Kingdom	Women's Single	(United Kingdom) Jenny Tranfield	(Belgium) Kim Hannes	(Canada) Carolyn Russell
Cardiff; United Kingdom	Team event	France	(United Kingdom) Great Britain	Canada
2000 – Details
Plzeň; Czech Republic	Men's Single	(France) Thierry Lincou	(Canada) Kelly Patrick	(United Kingdom) Ben Garner
Plzeň; Czech Republic	Women's Single	(Canada) Marnie Baizley	(Hong Kong) Wing Yin Chiu	(France) Isabelle Stoehr
Plzeň; Czech Republic	Team event	France	Canada	(United Kingdom) Great Britain
2002 – Details
Linz; Austria	Men's Single	(Egypt) Karim Darwish	(Egypt) Mohammed Abbas	(Egypt) Wael El Hindi
Linz; Austria	Women's Single	(France) Isabelle Stoehr	(United Kingdom) Jenny Tranfield	(Canada) Carolyn Russell
Linz; Austria	Team event	Egypt	France	(United Kingdom) Great Britain
2004
No competition
2006 – Details
Szeged; Hungary	Men's Single	(United Kingdom) Chris Ryder	(Hungary) Márk Krajcsák	(United Kingdom) Joel Hinds
Szeged; Hungary	Women's Single	(Malaysia) Lim Yoke Wah	(Germany) Kathrin Rohrmüller	(United Kingdom) Lauren Siddal
Szeged; Hungary	Team event	(United Kingdom) Great Britain	France	South Africa
2008 – Details
Cairo; Egypt	Men's Single	(Egypt) Ramy Ashour	(Egypt) Tarek Momen	(Egypt) Omar Mosaad
Cairo; Egypt	Women's Single	(Egypt) Raneem El Weleily	(Egypt) Omneya Abdel Kawy	(Canada) Alana Miller
Cairo; Egypt	Team event	Egypt	(United Kingdom) Great Britain	Malaysia
2010 – Details
Melbourne; Australia	Men's Single	(United Kingdom) Joel Hinds	(Germany) Jens Schoor	(United States) Todd Harrity
Melbourne; Australia	Women's Single	(Hong Kong) Annie Au	(United Kingdom) Emma Chorley	(United Kingdom) Kirsty McPhee
Melbourne; Australia	Team event	(United Kingdom) Great Britain	Hong Kong	United States
2012
No competition
2014 – Details
Chennai; India	Men's Single	(Egypt) Mazen Hesham	(Egypt) Zahed Mohamed	(United Kingdom) Eddie Charlton
Chennai; India	Women's Single	(United Kingdom) Millie Tomlinson	(Czech Republic) Olga Ertlová	(Egypt) Farah Abdel Meguid
Chennai; India	Team event	Egypt	(United Kingdom) Great Britain	Malaysia
2016 – Details
Kuala Lumpur; Malaysia	Men's Single	(Hong Kong) Tsz Fung Yip	(Malaysia) Ivan Yuen	(Hong Kong) Chi-Him Wong (United Kingdom) Joshua Masters
Kuala Lumpur; Malaysia	Women's Single	(Malaysia) Low Wee Wern	(Hong Kong) Tong Tsz Wing	(United Kingdom) Nada Elkalaawy (Malaysia) Nazihah Hanis
Kuala Lumpur; Malaysia	Team event	Malaysia	Hong Kong	Japan; South Africa
2018 – Details
Birmingham; United Kingdom	Men's Single	(United Kingdom) Joshua Masters	(Hong Kong) Tsz Fung Yip	(Malaysia) Mohd Syafiq Kamal (Malaysia) Addeen Idrakie
Birmingham; United Kingdom	Women's Single	(United Kingdom) Lily Taylor	(South Africa) Alexa Pienaar	(Malaysia) Aika Azman (Malaysia) Zoe Foo
Birmingham; United Kingdom	Team event	(United Kingdom) Great Britain	Malaysia	Hong Kong; France
2020
Shanghai; China	Men's Single	Cancelled due to COVID-19 pandemic in China.		
Shanghai; China	Women's Single	Cancelled due to COVID-19 pandemic in China.		
Shanghai; China	Team event	Cancelled due to COVID-19 pandemic in China.		
2022
Giza; Egypt	Men's Single	(Egypt) Mostafa Asal	(Egypt) Moustafa El Sirty	(Switzerland) Yannick Wilhelmi (Egypt) Yahya Elnawasany
Giza; Egypt	Women's Single	(Egypt) Sana Ibrahim	(Egypt) Nour Aboulmakarim	(Spain) Marta Domínguez (Switzerland) Cindy Merlo
Giza; Egypt	Team event	Egypt	France	Hong Kong; Switzerland
2024
Johannesburg; South Africa	Men's Single	(France) Baptiste Bouin	(Hong Kong) To Wai Lok	(India) Suraj Chand (Hong Kong) Chung Yat Long
Johannesburg; South Africa	Women's Single	(Spain) Marta Domínguez	(Hong Kong) Cheng Nga Ching	(Hong Kong) Toby Tse (Hong Kong) Heylie Fung
Johannesburg; South Africa	Team event	France	Hong Kong	Czech Republic; India
2026
Mumbai; India	Men's Single	(India) Suraj Chand	(Hungary) Benedek Takács	(France) Joshua Phinéra (India) Om Semwal
Mumbai; India	Women's Single	(Spain) Marta Domínguez	(Hong Kong) Heylie Fung	(Hong Kong) Kirstie Wong (Spain) Noa Romero
Mumbai; India	Team event	Hong Kong	India	France; Spain

== Medal table ==
Rank	Nation	Gold	Silver	Bronze	Total
1	Great Britain	10	6	10	26
2	Egypt	10	6	4	20
3	France	7	5	4	16
4	Hong Kong	3	9	8	20
5	Malaysia	3	2	7	12
6	Spain	2	0	3	5
7	Canada	1	3	4	8
8	India	1	1	3	5
9	Belgium	1	1	0	2
10	Brazil	1	0	0	1
11	Germany	0	2	2	4
12	Hungary	0	2	0	2
13	South Africa	0	1	2	3
14	Czech Republic	0	1	1	2
15	Switzerland	0	0	3	3
16	United States	0	0	2	2
17	Japan	0	0	1	1
Totals (17 entries)		39	39	54	132

== See also ==
- World Squash Federation
- International University Sports Federation (FISU)
- World Junior Squash Championships
