= 2009 Women's British Open Squash Championship =

British Open Squash Championships
- 81st Women's British Open Championships

Details
- Location: Manchester, England
- Venue: National Squash Centre

The 2009 Women's International Sport Group British Open Squash Championships were held at the National Squash Centre in Manchester from 9–14 September 2009. The event was won for the fourth time by Rachael Grinham who defeated Madeline Perry in the final. The British Open would not be held again until 2012 following sponsorship problems.

== Seeds ==
1. (Malaysia) Nicol David
2. (Australia) Rachael Grinham
3. (England) Alison Waters
4. (England) Jenny Duncalf
5. (Republic of Ireland) Madeline Perry
6. (England) Laura Massaro (née Lengthorn)
7. (France) Isabelle Stoehr
8. (Netherlands) Vanessa Atkinson

== Draw and results ==
=== First qualifying round ===
Player One	Player Two	Score
(England) Dominique Lloyd-Walter	(England) Becky Botwright	4-11 11-5 11-6 11-5
(Australia) Donna Urquhart	(England) Laura Hill	11-8 15-13 4-11 11-1
(England) Sarah Kippax	(New Zealand) Kylie Lindsay	11-8 11-4 11-9
(Denmark) Line Hansen	(England) Emma Beddoes	11-4 8-11 11-6 11-6
(Canada) Alana Miller	(England) Lauren Siddall	7-0 ret
(Egypt) Engy Kheirallah	(Wales) Deon Saffery	11-8 10-12 11-7 11-9
(Republic of Ireland) Aisling Blake	(England) Lauren Selby	11-6 11-4 11-5
(England) Fiona Moverley	(India) Joshna Chinappa	12-10 10-12 11-7 11-9

=== Final qualifying round ===
Player One	Player Two	Score
(England) Lloyd-Walter	(Canada) Miller	11-5 11-8 11-8
(Australia) Urquhart	(Egypt) Kheirallah	11-9 11-9 11-6
(England) Kippax	(Republic of Ireland) Blake	11-8 11-9 3-11 6-11 11-2
(Denmark) Hansen	(England) Moverley	11-6 11-9 11-13 12-10

=== First round ===
Player One	Player Two	Score
(Malaysia) Nicol David	(England) Lauren Briggs	11-5 11-4 11-5
(Australia) Rachael Grinham	(England) Dominique Lloyd-Walter	9-11 12-10 11-5 4-11 11-8
(England) Alison Waters	(New Zealand) Jaclyn Hawkes	11-6 11-9 11-6
(England) Jenny Duncalf	(England) Sarah Kippax	11-5 11-7 6-11 11-2
(Republic of Ireland) Madeline Perry	(Denmark) Line Hansen	11-9 11-5 11-2
(England) Laura Massaro (née Lengthorn)	(Mexico) Samantha Terán	10-12 7-11 11-8 11-4 11-6
(France) Isabelle Stoehr	(Australia) Donna Urquhart	7-11 9-11 11-8 11-7 7-11
(Netherlands) Vanessa Atkinson	(England) Tania Bailey	8-11 11-3 11-2 11-8

=== Quarter finals ===
Player One	Player Two	Score
(Malaysia) David	(Republic of Ireland) Perry	11-6 12-10 11-13 5-11 9-11
(Australia) Grinham R	(England) Massaro	5-11 14-12 11-7 11-7
(England) Waters	(Australia) Urquhart	6-11 11-5 11-3 11-7
(England) Duncalf	(Netherlands) Atkinson	11-1 10-12 11-6 11-4

=== Semi finals ===
Player One	Player Two	Score
(Australia) Grinham	(England) Duncalf	11-8 11-7 8-11 11-6
(England) Waters	(Republic of Ireland) Perry	12-10 8-11 7-11 9-11

=== Final ===
Player One	Player Two	Score
(Australia) Grinham	(Republic of Ireland) Perry	11-6 11-5 12-10

Preceded by 2008	British Open Squash Championships; England (Manchester); 2009	Succeeded by 2012
