= 2010 World University Squash Championship =

World University 2010
- 7th FISU World University Squash Championship
- Location: Melbourne, Australia
- Website www.squashsite.co.uk/2009/worlduniversity2010.htm

The 2010 World University Squash Championship is the edition of the 2010s World University Squash, which serves as the individual world squash championship for students. The event took place in Melbourne in Australia from 10 July to 18 July.

== Draw and results ==
Restricted from the quarter-final

=== Men's Single ===
Quarter finals
1	(United Kingdom) Joel Hinds	11	11	11
5/8	(South Africa) Richard Colburn	3	8	3
5/8	(Hong Kong) Leo Au	11	11	7	3	11
3/4	(Canada) Colin West	1	4	11	11	5
3/4	(United Kingdom) Peter Creed	10	8	11	5
5/8	(United States) Todd Harrity	12	11	7	11
5/8	(United Kingdom) Chris Hall	11	5	1	6
2	(Germany) Jens Schoor	7	11	11	11

Semi finals
1	(United Kingdom) Joel Hinds	13	11	11
5/8	(Hong Kong) Leo Au	11	8	8
5/8	(United States) Todd Harrity	7	8	6
2	(Germany) Jens Schoor	11	11	11

Final
1	(United Kingdom) Joel Hinds	11	11	11
2	(Germany) Jens Schoor	6	7	2

=== Women's Single ===
Quarter finals
1	(Hong Kong) Annie Au	11	11	11
5/8	(United States) Kristen Lange	5	3	6
5/8	(United Kingdom) Kirsty McPhee	11	8	5	11	11
(South Africa) Senada Haupt	9	11	11	6	6
3/4	(United Kingdom) Emma Chorley	11	11	11
5/8	(United States) Logan Greer	2	7	9
(Hong Kong) Shin Nga Leung	9	7	11	9
2	(Australia) Melody Francis	11	11	4	11

Semi finals
1	(Hong Kong) Annie Au	11	11	11
5/8	(United Kingdom) Kirsty McPhee	5	2	2
3/4	(United Kingdom) Emma Chorley	11	8	11	12
2	(Australia) Melody Francis	5	11	2	10

Final
1	(Hong Kong) Annie Au	11	11	11
3/4	(United Kingdom) Emma Chorley	8	5	4

=== Team Event ===
Semi finals
1	(United Kingdom) Great Britain	3
3	United States	0
4	Canada	1
2	Hong Kong	2

Final
1	(United Kingdom) Great Britain	2
2	Hong Kong	1

== See also ==
- World University Squash Championships
- World Squash Federation
