= 2008 World University Squash Championship =

Sporting event

World University 2008
- 6th FISU World University Squash Championship
- Location: Cairo, Egypt
- Website www.squashsite.co.uk/world_university_2008.htm

The 2008 World University Squash Championship is the edition of the 2008's World University Squash, which serves as the individual world squash championship for students. The event took place in Cairo in Egypt from 22 August to 28 August.

== Draw and results ==
Restricted from the quarter-final

=== Men's Single ===
Quarter finals
1	(Egypt) Ramy Ashour	11	11	11
5/8	(Austria) Aqeel Rehman	3	6	5
5/8	(Malaysia) Mohd Nafzahizam Adnan	12	8	11	7	7
3/4	(Malaysia) Mohd Nafiizwan Adnan	10	11	9	11	11
3/4	(Egypt) Tarek Momen	11	11	12
5/8	(United Kingdom) Alan Clyne	5	7	10
5/8	(United Kingdom) Jethro Binns	5	3
2	(Egypt) Omar Mosaad	11	6

Semi finals
1	(Egypt) Ramy Ashour	11	11	11
3/4	(Malaysia) Mohd Nafiizwan Adnan	3	6	5
3/4	(Egypt) Tarek Momen	7	11	11	12
2	(Egypt) Omar Mosaad	11	8	5	10

Final
1	(Egypt) Ramy Ashour	11	11	7	11
3/4	(Egypt) Tarek Momen	5	7	11	6

=== Women's Single ===
Quarter finals
1	(Egypt) Omneya Abdel Kawy	11	11	11
5/8	(Czech Republic) Lucie Fialová	3	6	6
9/16	(Austria) Birgit Coufal	3	3	9
3/4	(United Kingdom) Emma Beddoes	11	11	11
3/4	(Canada) Alana Miller	11	11	11
5/8	(Malaysia) Siti Munirah Jusoh	7	7	7
5/8	(Malaysia) Lim Yoke Wah	7	9	8
2	(Egypt) Raneem El Weleily	11	11	11

Semi finals
1	(Egypt) Omneya Abdel Kawy	11	8	7	11	11
3/4	(United Kingdom) Emma Beddoes	9	11	11	2	8
3/4	(Canada) Alana Miller	11	4	8	5
2	(Egypt) Raneem El Weleily	9	11	11	11

Final
1	(Egypt) Omneya Abdel Kawy	11	5	11	9	9
2	(Egypt) Raneem El Weleily	3	11	4	11	11

=== Team Event ===
Semi finals
1	Egypt	3
4	Canada	0
3	Malaysia	0
2	(United Kingdom) Great Britain	3

Final
1	Egypt	2
2	(United Kingdom) Great Britain	0

== See also ==
- World University Squash Championships
- World Squash Federation
