= 2007 Women's British Open Squash Championship =

British Open Squash Championships
- 79th Women's British Open Championships

Details
- Location: Manchester, England
- Venue: National Squash Centre

The 2007 Women's Dunlop British Open Squash Championships was held at the National Squash Centre in Manchester from 19–24 September 2007. The event was won for the third time by Rachael Grinham who defeated Nicol David in the final.

== Seeds ==
1. (Malaysia) Nicol David
2. (Australia) Natalie Grinham
3. (Australia) Rachael Grinham
4. (England) Tania Bailey
5. (United States) Natalie Grainger
6. (England) Vicky Botwright
7. (Republic of Ireland) Madeline Perry
8. (Netherlands) Vanessa Atkinson

== Draw and results ==
=== First qualifying round ===
Player One	Player Two	Score
(New Zealand) Jaclyn Hawkes	(England) Georgina Stoker	9-4 9-3 9-1
(England) Sarah Kippax	(England) Suzie Pierrepont	9-7 9-7 9-3
(Republic of Ireland) Laura Mylotte	(England) Dominique Lloyd-Walter	w/o
(India) Joshna Chinappa	(England) Fiona Moverley	9-7 9-4 9-1
(Republic of Ireland) Aisling Blake	(England) Kirsty McPhee	9-4 9-6 9-2
(England) Lauren Briggs	(France) Soraya Renai	9-3 9-6 9-3
(South Africa) Tenille Swartz	(England) Becky Botwright	2-9 10-8 10-8 9-2
(France) Isabelle Stoehr	(England) Laura Hill	9-4 10-8 3-9 9-4

=== Second qualifying round ===
Player One	Player Two	Score
(Republic of Ireland) Mylotte	(India) Chinappa	8-10 9-5 9-10 9-6 9-1
(England) Briggs	(Republic of Ireland) Blake	9-5 10-8 9-1
(France) Stoehr	(South Africa) Swartz	11-7 11-4 11-6
(New Zealand) Hawkes	(England) Kippax	9-0 9-5 7-9 9-6

=== First round ===
Player One	Player Two	Score
(Malaysia) Nicol David	(England) Laura Massaro (née Lengthorn)	9-5 9-6 9-4
(Australia) Natalie Grinham	(Republic of Ireland) Laura Mylotte	9-4 9-3 9-4
(Australia) Rachael Grinham	(France) Isabelle Stoehr	9-5 9-3 5-9 9-2
(England) Tania Bailey	(Netherlands) Annelize Naudé	9-4 3-9 9-1 9-2
(United States) Natalie Grainger	(New Zealand) Jaclyn Hawkes	9-5 9-1 9-1
(England) Vicky Botwright	(England) Jenny Duncalf	9-4 9-5 9-5
(Republic of Ireland) Madeline Perry	(England) Lauren Briggs	9-3 9-4 9-5
(Netherlands) Vanessa Atkinson	(England) Alison Waters	9-7 9-3 9-6

=== Quarterfinals ===
Player One	Player Two	Score
(Malaysia) David	(United States) Grainger	9-3 9-3 7-9 2-9 9-0
(Australia) Grinham N	(Republic of Ireland) Perry	9-3 9-6 9-7
(Australia) Grinham R	(Netherlands) Atkinson	7-9 9-7 9-6 9-0
(England) Bailey	(England) Botwright	6-9 10-8 9-4 2-9 9-0

=== Semi-finals ===
Player One	Player Two	Score
(Malaysia) David	(England) Bailey	9-1 10-8 9-3
(Australia) Grinham R	(Australia) Grinham N	9-3 10-9 10-8

=== Final ===
Player One	Player Two	Score
(Australia) Grinham R	(Malaysia) David	7-9 4-9 9-3 10-8 9-1

Preceded by 2006	British Open Squash Championships; England (Manchester); 2007	Succeeded by 2008
