= 2016 in squash sport =

This article lists the results for the sport of Squash in 2016.

- January 2 – December 3: 2016 World Squash Federation Schedule

== World squash championships ==
- April 23 – 30: 2015 Women's World Open Squash Championship in (Malaysia) Kuala Lumpur
  - (Egypt) Nour El Sherbini defeated (England) Laura Massaro 6–11, 4–11, 11–3, 11–5, 11–8, to win her first Women's World Open Squash Championship title.
- August 6 – 11: 2016 World Junior Squash Championships for Men and Women in (Poland) Bielsko-Biała
  - Men: (Malaysia) Eain Yow Ng defeated (Egypt) Saadeldin Abouaish, 11–3, 9–11, 11–7, 11–5, to win his first World Junior Squash Championships title.
  - Women: (Egypt) Nouran Gohar defeated fellow Egyptian, Rowan Reda Araby, 11–5, 11–6, 11–7, to win her second consecutive World Junior Squash Championships title.
- August 12 – 17: 2016 Men's World Junior Team Squash Championship in (Poland) Bielsko-Biała
  - Pakistan defeated Egypt, 2–1 in matches played, to win their fifth Men's World Junior Team Squash Championship title.
- August 15 – 19: 2016 World International Doubles Squash Championships in (Australia) Darwin, Northern Territory
  - Men's Doubles: (Scotland) Alan Clyne & Greg Lobban
  - Women's Doubles: (New Zealand) Joelle King & Amanda Landers-Murphy
  - Mixed Doubles: (New Zealand) Joelle King & Paul Coll
- September 5 – 11: 2016 World University Squash Championship in Kuala Lumpur
  - Men: (Hong Kong) Tsz Fung Yip
  - Women: (Malaysia) Wee Wern Low
  - Team: Malaysia
- September 24 – 30: 2016 World Masters Squash Championships in (South Africa) Johannesburg
  - For results, click here and go to Draws and Results tab.
- October 30 – November 6: 2016 Men's World Open Squash Championship in (Egypt) Cairo
  - (Egypt) Karim Abdel Gawad defeated fellow Egyptian, Ramy Ashour, 5–11, 11–6, 11–7, 2–1 (retired), to win his first Men's World Open Squash Championship title.
- November 27 – December 3: 2016 Women's World Team Squash Championships in (France) Issy-les-Moulineaux
  - Egypt defeated England, 2–1 in matches played, to win their third Women's World Team Squash Championships title.

== 2015–16 PSA World Series ==
- October 10 – 17, 2015: 2015 U.S. Open in (United States) Philadelphia
  - Men: (France) Grégory Gaultier defeated (Egypt) Omar Mosaad 11–6, 11–3, 11–5, to win his third U.S. Open title.
  - Women: (England) Laura Massaro defeated (Egypt) Nour El Tayeb 11–6, 9–11, 6–11, 11–8, 11–7, to win her second U.S. Open title.
- October 31 – November 6, 2015: 2015 Qatar Classic in Doha
  - Men: (Egypt) Mohamed El Shorbagy defeated (France) Grégory Gaultier 11–5, 11–7, 5–11, 12–10, to win his second Qatar Classic title.
  - Women: (England) Laura Massaro defeated (Egypt) Nour El Sherbini 11–8, 12–14, 11–9, 8–11, 11–9, to win her first Qatar Classic title.
- December 1 – 6, 2015: 2015 Hong Kong Open
  - Men: (Egypt) Mohamed El Shorbagy defeated (Australia) Cameron Pilley 11–8, 11–6, 11–8, to win his second consecutive Hong Kong Open title.
  - Women: (Malaysia) Nicol David defeated (England) Laura Massaro 15–13, 11–9, 11–3. to win her tenth consecutive Hong Kong Open title.
- January 7 – 14: 2016 Tournament of Champions in (United States) New York City
  - Men: (Egypt) Mohamed El Shorbagy defeated (England) Nick Matthew 8–11, 11–6, 11–8, 6–11, 11–6, to win his second consecutive Tournament of Champions title.
  - Women: (Egypt) Nour El Sherbini defeated (United States) Amanda Sobhy 11–4, 9–11, 12–10, 11–8, to win her first Tournament of Champions title.
- February 25 – March 2: 2016 Metro Squash Windy City Open in (United States) Chicago
  - Men: (Egypt) Mohamed El Shorbagy defeated (England) Nick Matthew by retirement. The score was 11–6, 11–3, and 1–0. Therefore, El Shorbagy won his first Windy City Open title.
  - Women: (Egypt) Raneem El Weleily defeated fellow Egyptian, Nour El Sherbini, 9–11, 11–6, 11–3, 11–6, to win her second consecutive Windy City Open title.
- March 21 – 27: 2016 British Open Squash Championships in (United Kingdom) Kingston upon Hull
  - Men: (Egypt) Mohamed El Shorbagy defeated fellow Egyptian, Ramy Ashour, 11–2, 11–5, 11–9, to win his second consecutive British Open Squash Championships title.
  - Women: (Egypt) Nour El Sherbini defeated fellow Egyptian, Nouran Gohar, 11–7, 9–11, 7–11, 11–6, 11–8, to win her first British Open Squash Championships title.
- April 24 – 29: 2016 El Gouna International 2016 in Egypt
  - (Egypt) Mohamed El Shorbagy defeated (France) Grégory Gaultier, 7–11, 9–11, 11–3, 11–9, 11–8, to win his first El Gouna International title.
- May 24 – 28: 2016 PSA World Series Finals in (United Arab Emirates) Dubai
  - Men: (France) Grégory Gaultier defeated (Australia) Cameron Pilley, 11–4, 11–5, 8–11, 11–6, to win his third PSA World Series Finals title.
  - Women: (England) Laura Massaro defeated (Egypt) Raneem El Weleily, 9–11, 11–6, 5–11, 12–10, 11–5, to win her first PSA World Series Finals title.
