= Squash New Zealand =

Governing body of New Zealand squash

- Sport: Squash
- Founded: 1932
- Regional affiliation: Oceania Squash Federation
- Headquarters: AUT Millennium, 17 Antares Place, Rosedale, Auckland
- Location: New Zealand
- Chairman: Kyle Pontifex
- Board members: Cheryl Gush; Vicki Beker; Dave Brown; David Hawes; Shiree Hart; Dame Susan Devoy
- CEO: Martin Dowson

Official website
- www.nzsquash.co.nz
- (New Zealand)

Squash New Zealand is the governing body of squash in New Zealand. Founded in 1932, Squash New Zealand is affiliated to both the World Squash Federation and Oceania Squash.

== Regional and club administration ==
Squash New Zealand is responsible for the administration of squash in 11 regions, each of which is managed by a regional district administration.

There are currently 200 clubs affiliated to Squash New Zealand which collectively creates a network of 590 individual squash courts.

== Honours and awards ==
=== National awards ===
The Squash New Zealand National Awards have awarded since 1974. The award categories include:

- Chairman's Award
- Club of the Year
- Most Improved Player
- National Coaching Awards
- Personality of the Year
- Refereeing Awards
- Rob Roche Award (Meritorious Service to Masters)
- Volunteer of the Year

=== Hall of Fame ===
Squash New Zealand is a sponsor of the New Zealand Squash Hall of Fame, established in 2009. The Hall currently has 30 inductees:

2009
- Murray Day OBE
- Dame Susan Devoy
- Mohamed Dardir Ali El-Bakary
- Roy Haddon
- Leilani Joyce
- Ross Norman
- Bruce Brownlee
- Stuart Davenport

2010

- Charlie Waugh
- Neven Barbour
- John Gillies
- Don Green
- Allen Johnes
- Nancy New
- Carol Owens
- Susie Simcock

2011

- Ann Stephens
- Paul Steel
- Norm Coe
- Pam Davis

2013

- Bill Murphy
- Trevor Johnston
- Robyn Blackwood
- Rob Crothall
- Jade Wilson
- Joanne Williams
- Jenny Webster

2014

- Bryden Clarke

2018

- Shelley Kitchen

2021

- Chas Evans

== See also ==
- New Zealand men's national squash team
- New Zealand women's national squash team
