= 2008 Women's British Open Squash Championship =

British Open Squash Championships
- 80th Women's British Open Championships

Details
- Location: Liverpool
- Venue: Echo Arena

The 2008 Women's British Open Squash Championship was held at the Echo Arena in Liverpool from 6 to 12 May. Nicol David won the event for the third time, beating Jenny Duncalf in the final.

== Seeds ==
1. (Malaysia) Nicol David
2. (Australia) Natalie Grinham
3. (Australia) Rachael Grinham
4. (United States) Natalie Grainger
5. (England) Jenny Duncalf
6. (New Zealand) Shelley Kitchen
7. (England) Vicky Botwright
8. (Egypt) Omneya Abdel Kawy

== Draw and results ==
=== First qualifying round ===
Player One	Player Two	Score
(Republic of Ireland) Madeline Perry	(New Zealand) Kylie Lindsay	9–4 9–1 9–3
(England) Emma Beddoes	(England) Emma Chorley	9–7 9–3 9–1
(Egypt) Engy Kheirallah	(Austria) Birgit Coufal	9–6 9–4 9–4
(England) Dominique Lloyd-Walter	(England) Carrie Hastings	9–7 9–0 9–0
(France) Isabelle Stoehr	(England) Becky Botwright	9–1 9–7 10–8
(New Zealand) Jaclyn Hawkes	(United States) Olivia Blatchford	9–1 9–1 9–2
(Netherlands) Annelize Naudé	(England) Jeannine Cowie	9–3 9–1 9–1
(Australia) Kasey Brown	(Argentina) Belen Etchechoury	9–0 9–2 9–0
(India) Joshna Chinappa	(England) Kirsty McPhee	10–9 0–9 9–2 9–7
(England) Lauren Briggs	(England) Vicky Hynes	10–8 9–4 9–4
(Malaysia) Delia Arnold	(England) Fiona Moverley	9–3 9–0 9–5
(England) Sarah Kippax	(New Zealand) Joelle King	0–9 9–6 9–2 9–1
(England) Lauren Siddall	(England) Lauren Selby	9–4 9–2 9–3
(New Zealand) Louise Crome	(England) Leonie Holt	9–6 9–1 5–9 9–2
(England) Suzie Pierrepont	(Argentina) Luz Etchechoury	9–1 9–3 9–3
(India) Dipika Pallikal	(Republic of Ireland) Kerri Shields	9–4 9–1 9–3

=== Second qualifying round ===
Player One	Player Two	Score
(Republic of Ireland) Perry	(India) Chinappa	9–4 10–8 9–1
(England) Beddoes	(England) Briggs	9–1 9–6 3–9 10–8
(Egypt) Kheirallah	(Malaysia) Arnold	9–3 3–9 9–3 10–8
(England) Lloyd-Walter	(England) Kippax	9–0 9–1 9–2
(France) Stoehr	(England) Siddall	10–9 9–2 9–0
(New Zealand) Hawkes	(New Zealand) Crome	9–5 9–3 4–9 9–1
(Netherlands) Naudé	(England) Pierrepont	9–6 10–8 4–9 9–2
(Australia) Brown	(India) Pallikal	9–2 9–0 9–1

=== Final qualifying round ===
Player One	Player Two	Score
(Republic of Ireland) Perry	(England) Beddoes	9–0 6–9 3–9 9–2 9–2
(Australia) Brown	(Netherlands) Naudé	9–3 9–2 9–0
(France) Stoehr	(New Zealand) Hawkes	10–8 9–0 5–9 9–0
(Egypt) Kheirallah	(England) Lloyd-Walter	5–9 9–4 9–2 9–4

=== First round ===
Player One	Player Two	Score
(Malaysia) Nicol David	(Republic of Ireland) Madeline Perry	9–6 9–3 9–5
(Australia) Natalie Grinham	(Hong Kong) Rebecca Chiu	9–4 9–0 6–9 9–2
(Australia) Rachael Grinham	(Egypt) Engy Kheirallah	9–6 9–1 9–2
(United States) Natalie Grainger	(Australia) Kasey Brown	9–5 9–3 9–7
(England) Jenny Duncalf	(England) Alison Waters	4–9 9–2 10–8 9–1
(New Zealand) Shelley Kitchen	(Netherlands) Vanessa Atkinson	8–10 9–3 9–4 9–2
(England) Vicky Botwright	(England) Laura Massaro(née Lengthorn)	6–9 9–2 9–4 6–9 6–9
(Egypt) Omneya Abdel Kawy	(France) Isabelle Stoehr	2–9 9–2 6–9 6–9

=== Quarter-finals ===
Player One	Player Two	Score
(Malaysia) David	(New Zealand) Kitchen	7–9 9–7 9–5 9–2
(Australia) Grinham N	(France) Stoehr	9–6 6–9 0–1 ret
(Australia) Grinham R	(England) Duncalf	5–9 9–1 7–9 1–9
(United States) Grainger	(England) Massaro	9–3 10–9 9–6

=== Semi-finals ===
Player One	Player Two	Score
(Malaysia) David	(United States) Grainger	9–5 9–1 9–0
(England) Duncalf	(France) Stoehr	4–9 9–3 9–6 9–6

=== Final ===
Player One	Player Two	Score
(Malaysia) David	(England) Duncalf	9–1 10–8 9–0

Preceded by 2007	British Open Squash Championships; England (Liverpool); 2008	Succeeded by 2009
