= Laura Hill =

Laura Hill may refer to:

- Laura Hill (squash player)
- Laura Hill (actress)
