= Murray Day =

New Zealand squash administrator (1931–2022)

Murray Day OBE

2nd President of the World Squash Federation
- In office 1975–1981
- Preceded by: Peter Phillips
- Succeeded by: Ian Stewart

Personal details
- Born: Murray Charles Day; 25 July 1931; Hamilton, New Zealand
- Died: 18 March 2022 (aged 90)
- Spouse: Ann Johnston (m. 1957)
- Children: 2
- Education: Wanganui Collegiate School
- Alma mater: Auckland University College
- Profession: Accountant

Murray Charles Day OBE (25 July 1931 – 18 March 2022) was a New Zealand sports administrator. He served as president of the New Zealand Squash Rackets Association, the Oceania Squash Federation, and the International Squash Rackets Federation (now the World Squash Federation).

== Biography ==
Born in Hamilton on 25 July 1931, Day was the son of Eric Charles Day and Mary Margaret Day (née McNicol). His father was appointed a Member of the Order of the British Empire in the 1953 Coronation Honours, for services in promoting rehabilitation activities in the South Auckland area. Murray Day was educated at Southwell School from 1939 to 1944, and then Wanganui Collegiate School, and went on to study accountancy at Auckland University College. He was admitted as an Associate Chartered Accountant (ACA) in 1959, and granted FCA status in 1969. Day served in the New Zealand Territorial Force, retiring with the rank of captain.

In 1957, Day married Ann Johnston, and the couple had two children.

Day was active in sports administration, particularly squash. He was president of the New Zealand Squash Rackets Association (now Squash New Zealand) from 1968 to 1971, and was closely involved in the organisation of the 1971 Men's World Team Squash Championships, the first world squash event to be staged in New Zealand. He was the New Zealand representative on the International Squash Rackets Federation (now the World Squash Federation) from 1967 to 1975, when he was elected the president of the federation, serving in that role until 1981. His leadership helped to transform the federation into a global body, and saw the membership of the body grow from 12 to 45 countries. In 1992, Day became the inaugural president of the Oceania Squash Federation, serving until 1995.

Outside of squash, Day was chair of the New Zealand Sports Assembly from 1993 to 1998. He was chairman of the Hamilton Golf Club, and became the first amateur golfer on the board of the New Zealand Professional Golfers' Association, serving from 1998 to 2009. He was a member of the Southwell School Trust Board for 27 years, including six years as chairman, and was president of the Hamilton Rotary Club from 1986 to 1987.

Day died at his home in Hamilton on 18 March 2022.

== Honours and awards ==
Day was made a life member of the New Zealand Squash Rackets Association in 1976, the Squash Rackets Association (England) in 1977, and the Oceania Squash Federation in 1997. He was made an honorary member of the International Squash Rackets Federation in 1981, and was an inaugural inductee into the New Zealand Squash Hall of Fame in 2009.

In the 1981 New Year Honours, Day was appointed an Officer of the Order of the British Empire, for services to squash.
