= Ann Stephens (disambiguation) =

Ann Stephens (1931–1966) was a British child actress and singer.

Ann(e) Stevens or Stephens may also refer to:

- Ann Stephens (squash player) (1933–2022), New Zealand squash and badminton player
- Ann S. Stephens (1810–1886), American novelist
- Anne Stephens (Bartimaeus), Bartimaeus character
- Anne Stephens (WRAF officer) (1912–2000), director of British WRAF
- Anne Stevens, Hawaiian politician
- Anne L. Stevens (born 1948), American businesswoman
- Ann Stephens (badminton) (born 1965), Northern Irish badminton player
- Ann Samantha Stevens, a character from Image Comics

== See also ==
- Annie Fitzgerald Stephens (1844–1934), American landowner, businesswoman, and political activist
- Annie Stevens Perkins (1868–1946), née Stevens, American writer
