= 2014 World University Squash Championship =

World University 2014
- 8th FISU World University Squash Championship
- Location: Chennai, India
- Website wucsquash2014.com

The 2014 World University Squash Championship is the edition of the 2014's World University Squash, which serves as the individual world squash championship for students. The event took place in Chennai in India from 1 September to 7 September.

== Draw and results ==
Restricted from the quarter-final

=== Men's Single ===
Quarter finals
1	(Egypt) Mazen Hesham	8	11	11	11
5/8	(Malaysia) Sanjay Singh	11	6	3	8
5/8	(Malaysia) Addeen Idrakie	8	9	11	11	5
3/4	(United Kingdom) Eddie Charlton	11	11	8	7	11
3/4	(Pakistan) Saqib Yousaf	11	9	15	8	11
(South Africa) Andrew Martin	8	11	13	11	3
5/8	(United Kingdom) Joel Makin	10	8	8
2	(Egypt) Zahed Mohamed	12	11	11

Semi finals
1	(Egypt) Mazen Hesham	13	11	11
3/4	(United Kingdom) Eddie Charlton	11	7	9
3/4	(Pakistan) Saqib Yousaf	6	11	1	7
2	(Egypt) Zahed Mohamed	11	7	11	11

Final
1	(Egypt) Mazen Hesham	11	11	11
2	(Egypt) Zahed Mohamed	8	9	6

=== Women's Single ===
Quarter finals
1	(Czech Republic) Olga Ertlová	8	11	11	11
5/8	(France) Chloé Mesic	11	9	2	6
5/8	(South Africa) Alexandra Fuller	9	11	11	13
3/4	(Malaysia) Zulhijjah Binti Azan	11	8	5	11
3/4	(South Africa) Cheyna Tucker	2	11	3	4
5/8	(United Kingdom) Camilla Tomlinson	11	7	11	11
(India) Aparajitha Balamurukan	3	5	12	4
2	(Egypt) Farah Abdel Meguid	11	11	10	11

Semi finals
1	(Czech Republic) Olga Ertlová	11	11	11
5/8	(South Africa) Alexandra Fuller	7	3	5
5/8	(United Kingdom) Camilla Tomlinson	10	11	11	11
2	(Egypt) Farah Abdel Meguid	12	9	3	7

Final
1	(Czech Republic) Olga Ertlová	8	6	1
5/8	(United Kingdom) Camilla Tomlinson	11	11	11

=== Team Event ===
Semi finals
1	Egypt	2
3/4	Malaysia	0
3/4	South Africa	0
2	(United Kingdom) Great Britain	2

Final
1	Egypt	2
2	(United Kingdom) Great Britain	1

== See also ==
- World University Squash Championships
- World Squash Federation
