= 2016 World University Squash Championship =

World University 2016
- 9th FISU World University Squash Championship
- Location: Kuala Lumpur, Malaysia
- Website www.wucsquash2016.com

The 2016 World University Squash Championship is the 2016 edition of the World University Squash, which serves as the individual world squash championship for students. The event was scheduled to take place in Kuala Lumpur in Malaysia.

== Draw and results ==
Restricted from the quarter-final

=== Men's Single ===
Quarter finals

Semi finals

Final

=== Women's Single ===
Quarter finals

Semi finals

Final

=== Team Event ===
Semi finals

Final

== See also ==
- World University Squash Championships
- World Squash Federation
