= New Zealand national squash team =

New Zealand national squash team may refer to:

- New Zealand men's national squash team
- New Zealand women's national squash team
