= Susie Simcock =

New Zealand sports administrator (1938–2020)

Susie Simcock ONZM
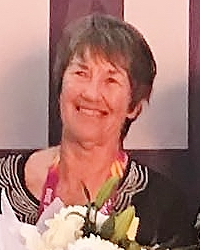

6th President of the World Squash Federation
- In office 1996–2002
- Preceded by: Tunku Imran
- Succeeded by: Jahangir Khan

Personal details
- Born: 25 November 1938 New Zealand
- Died: 29 May 2020 (aged 81) Auckland, New Zealand

Susan Mary Simcock ONZM (25 November 1938 – 29 May 2020) was a New Zealand sports administrator who served as president of the World Squash Federation from 1996 to 2002.

In the 2004 Queen's Birthday Honours, Simcock was appointed an Officer of the New Zealand Order of Merit, for services to sports administration and squash.
