= Suraj Chand =

Indian squash player

Suraj Kumar Chand
Personal information
- Born: 19 April 2001 (age 25) Mumbai, Maharashtra, India
- Height: 1.64 m (5 ft 5 in)
- Weight: 69 kg (152 lb)

Sport
- Country: India
- Handedness: Right-handed
- Coached by: Laxman Joshi
- Retired: Active

Men's singles
- Highest ranking: 142 (March 2025)
- PSA Profile
Medal record
Men's squash
Representing India
Asian Games
Bronze medal – third place	2026 Aichi–Nagoya	Men's team

Suraj Kumar Chand is an Indian squash player. He competes on the Professional Squash Association Tour and represents India in international competitions.

== Early life ==
Chand began playing squash at the age of 11 or 12 at the Jindal Squash Academy in Mumbai under coach Laxman Joshi. He joined the PSA in 2021.

== Career ==
In 2022, Chand reached the final of the Rajasthan Classic Squash tournament, where he finished runner-up to Rahul Baitha.

In 2024, Chand represented India at the 2024 FISU World University Championship Squash in Johannesburg, where he won bronze medals in the men's singles and team events. He also represented India at the 2024 Asian Senior Team Squash Championship.

In 2025, Chand reached a career-high PSA ranking of 142 on 31 March. He also represented Somaiya Vidyavihar University in inter-university competitions.

In April 2026, Chand won the SRFI Indian Tour event in Chennai, defeating South Korea's Jeongmin Ryu in the final.

In August 2026, Chand won the men's singles title at the 2026 FISU World University Championship Squash in Mumbai. He defeated Hungary's Benedek Takács 3–2 in the final and became the first Indian men's singles champion at the event.

In September 2026, Chand represented India at the 2026 Asian Games in Aichi-Nagoya, Japan. He was part of the men's team that included Abhay Singh, Veer Chotrani and Velavan Senthilkumar. India won the bronze medal after losing 2–1 to Malaysia in the semi-final.
