= Christo Potgieter =

South African squash player (born 1987)

Personal information
- Born: 1 June 1987 (age 39) Windhoek, Namibia

Sport
- Coached by: Craig van der Wath
- Racquet used: Salming
- Highest ranking: 136 (May 2015)
- Current ranking: 247 (February 2020)
Medal record
Men's squash
Representing South Africa
World Doubles Championships
Bronze medal – third place	2019 Carrara	Doubles
- Updated on 13 April 2022

Christo Potgieter (born 1 June 1987) is a South African professional squash player. He achieved his highest career PSA singles ranking of 136 in May 2015.
