= Lim Yoke Wah =

Malaysian squash player (born 1986)

Personal information
- Born: 6 January 1986 (age 40) Ipoh, Malaysia

Sport
- Country: Malaysia
- Handedness: Right Handed
- Turned pro: 2003
- Coached by: Lee See Wee, Ahmed Malik
- Retired: 2009
- Racquet used: Wilson

Women's singles
- Highest ranking: No. 41 (June 2008)
- Current ranking: No. 58 (December 2009)
- Updated on 20 December 2009

Chinese name
- Traditional Chinese: 林玉華
- Simplified Chinese: 林玉华
- Hanyu Pinyin: Lín Yùhuá
- Hokkien POJ: Lîm Gio̍k-hôa

Lim Yoke Wah (林玉华; born 6 January 1986 in Ipoh, Perak) is a professional squash player who represented Malaysia.

Lim grew up in her hometown Ipoh and started playing squash aged ten after being introduced to the sport by a coach. She was trained by Lee See Wee and Ahmed Malik from Pakistan.

In 2002, Lim represented Malaysia at the Hong Kong Junior Open and defeated Lau Siu-ying (劉小瑩) of Hong Kong to win the tournament. In 2006, Lim became the first Malaysian to win a gold medal at the World University Squash Championships. By that year, Lim ranked as the top women's player in Perak.

During her squash career she was based in Kuala Lumpur and coached by Ahmed Malik while studying at Universiti Putra Malaysia.
