= Erick Herrera =

Colombian squash player (born 1989)

Personal information
- Full name: Erick Daniel Herrera Pelaez
- Born: March 23, 1989 (age 37) Bogotá, Colombia
- Height: 180 cm (5 ft 11 in)
- Weight: 80 kg (176 lb)

Sport
- Country: Colombia
- Turned pro: 2006
- Racquet used: Karakal raw 120
- Highest ranking: 285 (August 2016)
Medal record
Representing Colombia
Men's squash
South American Games
Gold medal – first place	2010 Medellín	Team

Erick Daniel Herrera Pelaez (born March 23, 1989), known as Erick Herrera, is a Colombian professional male squash player. He reached a career-high world ranking of 285 in August 2016.
