= Ann Stephens (squash player) =

New Zealand squash and badminton player (1933–2022)

Personal information
- Born: Ann Eleanor Mackenzie; 28 March 1933
- Died: 17 December 2022 (aged 89)
- Spouse: Albert Stephens

Sport
- Country: New Zealand
- Sport: Squash; Badminton

Achievements and titles
- National finals: Squash singles champion (1956, 1957, 1958, 1960, 1961, 1963)

Ann Eleanor Stephens (née Mackenzie; 28 March 1933 – 17 December 2022) was a New Zealand squash and badminton player. In 2011, she was inducted into the New Zealand Squash Hall of Fame.

Stephens died on 17 December 2022, at the age of 89.

== Awards ==
- New Zealand Squash Championships (1956, 1957, 1958, 1960, 1961, 1963)
