= Lauren Selby =

English squash player (born 1984)

Personal information
- Born: 18 July 1984 (age 42) Sawbridgeworth, England
- Website: www.laurenselby.com

Sport
- Country: England
- Handedness: Right Handed
- Turned pro: 2006
- Coached by: Paul Selby & Lee Drew
- Retired: 2013
- Racquet used: Head

Women's singles
- Highest ranking: No. 34 (October 2012)
- Title: 1
- Tour final: 7
- Updated on December 2019

Lauren Selby (born 18 July 1984 in Sawbridgeworth) is a professional squash player who represents England. She reached a career-high world ranking of World No. 34 in October 2012. Her brother is the professional squash player Daryl Selby. She attended Brentwood School in Brentwood, Essex during her secondary school years. She also coached at Ardleigh Squash Club, Essex.
