= Chris Ryder (squash player) =

English squash player (born 1980)

Personal information
- Born: 22 August 1980 (age 45) Aylesbury, England
- Height: 1.78 m (5 ft 10 in)
- Weight: 70 kg (154 lb)

Sport
- Country: England
- Turned pro: 1999
- Coached by: Keir Worth
- Retired: 2013
- Racquet used: Head

Men's singles
- Highest ranking: No. 33 (October 2008)
- Title: 6
- Tour final: 16
- Updated on November 2017

Chris Ryder (born 22 August 1980 in Aylesbury) is a professional squash player who represents England. He reached a career-high world ranking of World No. 33 in October 2008.
