= Márk Krajcsák =

Hungarian squash player (born 1983)

Personal information
- Full name: Krajcsák Márk
- Born: 28 December 1983 (age 42) Budapest, Hungary
- Years active: 10
- Height: 1.78 m (5 ft 10 in)
- Weight: 74 kg (163 lb)
- Website: http://krajcsakmark.hu

Sport
- Country: Hungary
- Handedness: Right Handed
- Turned pro: 2003
- Coached by: Colin White; Sjef Van Der Heiden
- Retired: 2013
- Racquet used: Karakal

Men's singles
- Highest ranking: No. 37 (November 2009)
- Title: 10
- Tour final: 15
- Updated on June 2019

Márk Krajcsák (born 28 December 1983 in Budapest) is a former professional squash player who represented Hungary. He achieved his career-high world ranking of number 37 in November 2008.
