= Georgina Stoker =

English squash player (born 1985)

Personal information
- Born: 24 October 1985 (age 40) Victoria, Hong Kong

Sport
- Country: England
- Handedness: right-handed
- Racquet used: Harrow

women's singles
- Highest ranking: 47 (December 2006)

Georgina Stoker (born 24 October 1985) is an English female professional squash player. She achieved her highest career ranking of 47 in December 2006 during the 2006 PSA World Tour and last played for England women's national squash team during the 2017 PSA World Tour.

She is currently residing in the United States.
