= Oceania Squash Federation =

Oceania governing body for the sport of squash

- Abbreviation: OSF
- Formation: 1992
- Type: Sports organisation
- Headquarters: Banksia Beach, Queensland, Australia
- Region served: Oceania
- Members: 12 member associations
- President: (New Zealand) Jim O’Grady
- Vice-president: (Australia) Dinesh Parmeshwar (Papua New Guinea) Lady Anna Ballinger-Togolo
- Executive Officer: (Australia) Carol Kawaljenko
- Parent organisation: World Squash Federation
- Website: www.oceaniasquash.org

The Oceania Squash Federation (OSF) was set up in 1992 regulates squash throughout Oceania.

It is based in Wanguri, Northern Territory in Australia. As of 2012 it has 12 member federations

== List of members ==
Nation	Federation	President
Australia	Squash Australia	David Mandel
Cook Islands	Cook Islands Squash Rackets Association	Robert Skews
Fiji	Squash Fiji	Ravi Singh
New Caledonia	Ligue Calédonienne de Squash	Jean Jacques Annonier
New Zealand	Squash New Zealand	Neil McAra
Niue	Niue Squash Association	Simon Jackson
Norfolk Island	Norfolk Island Squash	Mal Tarrant
Papua New Guinea	Papua New Guinea Squash Rackets Federation	Edmond Pereira
Samoa	Samoa Squash Rackets Association	Norman Wetzell
(French Polynesia) Tahiti	Tahiti Squash Rackets Association	Patrick Morelle
Tonga	Tonga Squash Rackets Association	Tapu Panuve
Vanuatu	Vanuatu Squash Federation	Yannick Jacobe

== See also ==
- 2015 Pacific Games
