= Joel Hinds =

English squash player (born 1987)

Personal information
- Born: 18 June 1987 (age 39) Derby, England
- Height: 1.87 m (6 ft 2 in)
- Weight: 76 kg (168 lb)

Sport
- Country: England
- Turned pro: 2007
- Coached by: David Campion
- Racquet used: Black Knight

Men's singles
- Highest ranking: No. 69 (April 2011)
- Current ranking: No.2 (In Manchester) (October 25)
- Title: 6
- Updated on October 2018

Joel Hinds (born 18 June 1987 in Derby) is a professional squash player who represents England. He reached a career-high world ranking of World No. 73 in August 2011.
