= Lauren Siddall =

English squash player (born 1984)

Personal information
- Born: 1 November 1984 (age 41) Pontefract, England

Sport
- Country: England
- Handedness: Right/Left Handed
- Turned pro: 2004
- Coached by: Malcolm Willstrop
- Retired: Active
- Racquet used: Tecnifibre

Women's singles
- Highest ranking: No. 37 (October 2008)
- Updated on February 2019

Lauren Siddall (born 1 November 1984 in Pontefract, England) is an English professional squash player who represented England as a junior. She reached a career-high world ranking of World No. 37 in October 2008.

As of 2016, Siddall had won the Namibian Squash Open Championships a record four times.
