= Laura Hill (squash player) =

English squash player (born 1976)

Personal information
- Born: 22 May 1976 (age 50) Chesterfield, England

Sport
- Country: England
- Handedness: Right Handed
- Turned pro: 2005
- Retired: 2012
- Racquet used: Head

Women's singles
- Highest ranking: No. 43 (March 2008)
- Title: 1
- Tour final: 3
- Updated on December 2019

Laura Hill (born 22 May 1976 in Chesterfield) is a professional squash player who represented England. She reached a career-high world ranking of World No. 43 in March 2008.
