= World Squash =

World governing body for the sport of squash

- Abbreviation: WS
- Formation: 5 January 1967; 59 years ago
- Type: Federation of national associations
- Headquarters: Hastings, England
- Members: 115 national associations
- Official language: English
- Patron: (Malaysia) Tunku Imran
- Emeritus president: (Pakistan) Jahangir Khan
- President: (England) Zena Wooldridge
- Vice presidents: (Hong Kong) David Mui; (New Zealand) Susan Devoy; (India) Debendranath Sarangi; (United States) Marshall Pagon
- Key people: CEO: (France) William Louis-Marie; Operations Manager: (England) Carol Hackett
- Affiliations: Association of IOC Recognised International Sports Federations
- Website: World Squash
- Formerly called: International Squash Rackets Association; World Squash Federation

World Squash, brand name of the World Squash Federation Ltd, is the international federation for the indoor racket sport of squash. It is recognized by the International Olympic Committee. It is also a member of the Global Association of International Sports Federations and the Association of the IOC Recognised International Sports Federations.

== Background ==
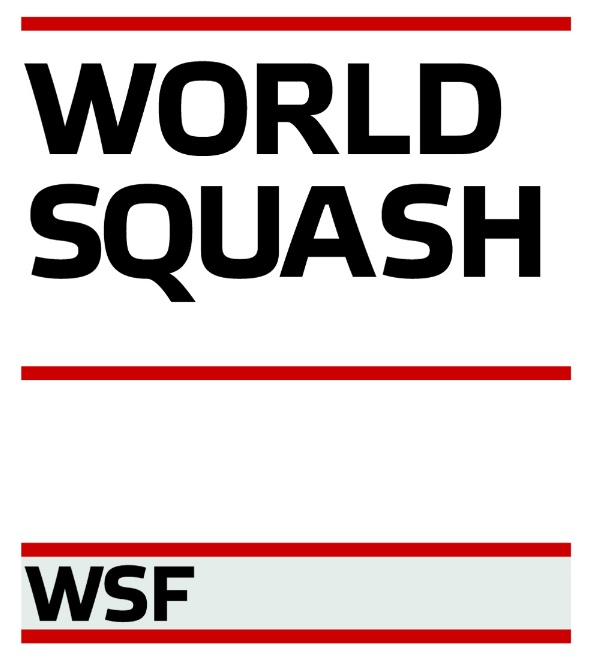
WSF Logo until 2025.

In its early days, international Squash was controlled by the Squash Rackets Association of England and the United States Squash Rackets Association. In 1966 representatives of the sport from Australia, Great Britain, India, New Zealand, Pakistan, South Africa, USA, Canada and the United Arab Republic met in London. To harness the growth and to promote and co-ordinate the sport, the formation of the International Squash Rackets Association (ISRF) was decided, with its first meeting being held on 5 January 1967.

Its name was changed in 1992 to the World Squash Federation. In 2025, the name was rebranded to World Squash, as one of the preparations for the sport's Olympic debut.

It is based in Hastings in England. The first squash court was built in England in 1865; there are now around 50,000 courts in more than 185 nations worldwide. As of 2026 it has 115 member federations.

== Tournaments ==
Senior events

- Olympic Games
- World Games
- World Squash Championships
- World Squash Team Championships
- World Squash Doubles Championships
- Squash World Cup
- PSA Squash Tour

Junior events

- World Squash Junior Championships
- World Squash Junior Team Championships
- World Junior Squash Circuit
- U21 Squash World Cup

University events

- World University Squash Championships

Master events

- World Masters Squash Championships

== Presidents ==
Below is the list of presidents since 1967 :

No.	Years	Name
1	1967–1975	(England) Peter Phillips
2	1975–1981	(New Zealand) Murray Day OBE
3	1981–1985	(Canada) Ian Stewart
4	1985–1989	(Scotland) Ronnie Sinclair
5	1989–1996	(Malaysia) HRH Tunku Imran
6	1996–2002	(New Zealand) Susie Simcock
7	2002–2008	(Pakistan) Jahangir Khan
8	2008–2016	(India) Narayana Ramachandran
9	2016–2020	(France) Jacques Fontaine
10	2020–present	(England) Zena Wooldridge OBE

== Membership ==
World Squash has 115 Members, all of whom are National Associations of squash, recognized by their National Olympic Committee (NOC) or Ministry of Sport as the sole and undisputed governing body for the sport in the country. Members are required to join one of the five Continental Federations which are an integral part of the World Squash structure. Members receive a number of votes to be used at General Meetings depending on the number of squash courts in their country.

== Management ==
Previous WSF Logo

World Squash is managed by an executive board (the board), responsible for day-to-day control of the Federation and an executive committee (ExCo) which assists the board in the strategy and policy making process. Members of the board are elected at general meetings and consist of a president and four vice-presidents, who each serve four year terms of office. One additional vice-president may be co-opted on an annual basis if required.

ExCo comprises all members of the board plus one continental vice-president appointed by each of the five Continental Federations. The joint Chairs of the Athletes Commission and a representative of PSA are members of ExCo.

The board is supported by a number of committees, commissions and panels whose members are volunteers with specialist knowledge coming from the Continental Federations and Player Association. World Squash employs professional staff who are responsible for implementing the decisions of these bodies whose main activities are described below.

== Actions ==
=== World calendar of events ===
World Squash works closely with the Player Association – the Professional Squash Association (PSA) – to control and co-ordinate the world calendar for squash. Championships are held in all major squash playing nations and are integrated with the World Championships and Major Games calendar to ensure that there are no clashes of dates.

=== World Championships and major games ===
The Championships Committee is responsible for running and promoting World Championships for men, women, juniors and masters at individual and team levels in both singles and doubles via National Federations. World Championships are run by World Squash Members, who tender for the events at least three years in advance. Team Championships are held every two years; and Open/Individual Championships are held annually. The committee is also responsible for ensuring that squash is represented in all major continental multi-sport games – squash is now included in the Pan-American Games, Asian Games, Commonwealth Games, World Games Pacific Games and All Africa Games. Starting with the 2028 Summer Olympic Games, Squash will be part of the Games.

=== Olympic Games ===
World Squash has established an Olympic Games Committee which is responsible for conducting a high-profile campaign for squash to be accepted as a full medal sport in the Olympic Games.

=== Athletes Commission ===
The Athletes Commission comprises representatives from PSA. The men's and women's chair, report to ExCo and represents the interests of the current players in areas such as Championship Regulations and implementation of the new WADA Code.

=== Coaching and development ===
World Squash encourages the development of squash, not only in countries where it is a new sport but also where it is already well-established. Advice on all development matters is given to members and is implemented through the group of World Squash specialists in the Coaching & Development Committee and via "best practice" on the World Squash website. Committee Members identify needs for development projects in their regions and recommend activity plans to World Squash for resources and funding. The committee organises a Coaching Conference on an annual basis and runs coaching courses in new and developing squash nations to help develop local coaches. The committee also organises a management conference for senior executives in national associations so they can network, share resources and establish best practice on the World Squash website.

=== Referees and rules ===
The Referees Committee has responsibility for implementing and running a Referees’ Programme which trains, accredits and assesses the World Squash Referees. A referees conference is organised on a biennial basis. The Rules Commission continually monitors the rules of the sport and makes recommendations for change. It also provides an on-line rules answers service to the public on interpretation of the rules.

=== Court and equipment specifications ===
The Technical Committee sets standards for all technical aspects of squash, including court construction, rackets, balls, eye protection and clothing. It inspects and accredits court components which meet the specifications and works with its partner companies to promote good practice in court construction worldwide.

=== Anti-doping ===
The Anti-Doping Commission ensures that squash is fully compliant with the new WADA Code. The commission is responsible for establishing a Registered Testing Pool and an Athletes Whereabouts System for out-of-competition testing. It has established a panel of physicians which reviews Therapeutic Use Exemptions (TUE) and calls on specialist Doping Hearing and Review Panels when required.

=== Medical ===
The Medical Commission generates positive guidelines for all medical aspects of playing and training for squash. It identifies and gives medical advice on topics such as eye protection, heart health, injury prevention and injury management.

=== Ethics and disciplinary matters ===
World Squash maintains an independent Ethics Panel, established following a recommendation from the International Olympic Committee (IOC). It also operates a Disciplinary Committee, with cases subject to review by an independent Appeals Panel when required. Appeals are reported to occur infrequently.

=== Promotion and publicity ===
World Squash delivers an information and publicity service to squash players and the sports media worldwide. Press information is circulated regularly through the World Squash's media services, who are also responsible for ensuring that up-to-date information on World Championships and other major squash events appears on the World Squash website.

=== Squash 57 ===
World Squash renamed Racketball as Squash 57 in September 2015 to distinguish it from the sport of Racquetball, and in January 2017 updated the Standard Rules for it.

== Continental association ==
Continent	Federation	President
Asia (1980)	Asian Squash Federation (ASF)	(Hong Kong) Duncan Chiu
Europe (1973)	European Squash Federation (ESF)	(Sweden) Thomas Troedsson
Africa (1992)	Squash Federation of Africa (SFA)	(Zimbabwe) Lucky Mlilo
Oceania (1992)	Oceania Squash Federation (OSF)	(Australia) Robert Donaghue
America (1989)	Federation of Panamerica (FPS)	(Colombia) Sergio Becerra

== World tour ==
- Professional Squash Association

== Awards ==
- PSA Awards

== See also ==
- World Squash Championships
- World Squash Doubles Championships
- World Team Squash Championships
- PSA Awards
- PSA World Tour
