= 2014 Women's European Individual Closed Championships =

2014 European Individual Championships

Details
- Event name: 2014 European Individual Closed Championships
- Location: France Valenciennes
- Website europeansquash-valenciennes2014.fr/en

The 2014 Women's European Individual Closed Championships is the women's edition of the 2014 European Squash Individual Championships, which serves as the individual European championship for squash players. The event took place in Valenciennes in France from 4 to 7 June 2014. Camille Serme won her third European Individual Championships title, defeating Line Hansen in the final.

== Seeds ==
1. (France) Camille Serme (Champion)
2. (Denmark) Line Hansen (Final)
3. (Czech Republic) Lucie Fialová (Semifinals)
4. (France) Coline Aumard (Quarterfinals)
5. (France) Laura Pomportes (Quarterfinals)
6. (Czech Republic) Olga Ertlová (Quarterfinals)
7. (Switzerland) Gaby Huber (Semifinals)
8. (Spain) Xisela Aranda (Quarterfinals)

== Draw and results ==
=== Finals ===
First round
1	(France) Camille Serme	11	11	11
Q	(France) Elise Romba	4	4	5
Q	(France) Cyrielle Peltier	9	6	11
6	(Czech Republic) Olga Ertlová	11	11	13
8	(Spain) Xisela Aranda	11	11	11
Q	(France) Maud Duplomb	6	9	4
Q	(France) Marie Stephan	11	6	6
3	(Czech Republic) Lucie Fialová	13	11	11
4	(France) Coline Aumard	11	6	11	7	11
Q	(Germany) Franziska Hennes	7	11	5	11	7
Q	(Austria) Birgit Coufal	7	6	11	11	4
7	(Switzerland) Gaby Huber	11	11	6	6	11
5	(France) Laura Pomportes
(Norway) Lotte Eriksen	w/o
Q	(Czech Republic) Anna Klimundova	6	3	9
2	(Denmark) Line Hansen	11	11	11

Quarter finals
1	(France) Camille Serme	8	11	11	11
6	(Czech Republic) Olga Ertlová	11	3	6	7
8	(Spain) Xisela Aranda	9	9	12	4
3	(Czech Republic) Lucie Fialová	11	11	10	11
4	(France) Coline Aumard	3	11	9	7
7	(Switzerland) Gaby Huber	11	6	11	11
5	(France) Laura Pomportes	11	6	8	9
2	(Denmark) Line Hansen	8	11	11	11

Semi finals
1	(France) Camille Serme	11	11	11
3	(Czech Republic) Lucie Fialová	0	4	0
7	(Switzerland) Gaby Huber	11	7	7	8
2	(Denmark) Line Hansen	9	11	11	11

Final
1	(France) Camille Serme	11	11	11
2	(Denmark) Line Hansen	6	5	4

Third place match
3	(Czech Republic) Lucie Fialová	11	11	9	11
7	(Switzerland) Gaby Huber	3	5	11	9

== See also ==
- 2014 Men's European Individual Closed Championships
- European Squash Individual Championships

Preceded by Belgium (Herentals); 2013	European Squash Championships; France (Valenciennes); 2014	Succeeded by Slovakia (Bratislava); 2015
