= 2014 European Squash Team Championships =

Squash tournament

- 42nd
- Location: (Italy) Riccione
- Date: 30 April – 3 May 2014
- Website europeansquash.com

Results
- Champions: Men England; Women England

The 2014 European Squash Team Championships was the 42nd edition of European Squash Team Championships for squash players. The event was held in Riccione, Italy, from 30 April – 3 May 2014. The tournament was organised by the European Squash Federation.

The England men's team won their 39th title and the England women's team won their 36th title.

== Men's tournament ==
=== Group stage ===
Group A

Pos	Team	P	W	L	Pts
1	England	3	3	0	6
2	Scotland	3	2	1	4
3	Spain	3	1	2	2
4	Finland	3	0	3	0

Group B

Pos	Team	P	W	L	Pts
1	France	3	3	0	6
2	Germany	3	2	1	4
3	Netherlands	3	1	2	2
4	Denmark	3	0	3	0

=== Semi-finals ===
England
3
Semi-final 1

Germany
0

			1	2	3	4	5
1	(England) (Germany)	Adrian Grant; Carsten Schoor	11; 7	11; 4	11; 4
2	(England) (Germany)	Nick Matthew; Raphael Kandra	11; 9	11; 7	11; 7
3	(England) (Germany)	James Willstrop; Jens Schoor	11; 4	11; 2

France
2
Semi-final 2

Scotland
0

			1	2	3	4	5
1	(France) (Scotland)	Lucas Serme; Kevin Moran	5; 6	11; 8	11; 5	11
2	(France) (Scotland)	Grégory Gaultier; Alan Clyne	11; 7	11; 6	11; 7
3	(France) (Scotland)	Mathieu Castagnet; Greg Lobban	6; 11	11; 3

=== Third place ===
Germany
3
Third place

Scotland
0

			1	2	3	4	5
1	(Germany) (Scotland)	Raphael Kandra; Greg Lobban	11; 3	11; 7	4; 11	11; 8
2	(Germany) (Scotland)	Simon Rosner; Alan Clyne	11; 4	11; 2	11; 6
3	(Germany) (Scotland)	Jens Schoor; Chris Small	7; 7	11; 3	11; 9

=== Final ===
England
2
Final

France
1

			1	2	3	4	5
1	(England) (France)	James Willstrop; Mathieu Castagnet	11; 6	7; 11	8; 11	11; 4	11; 6
2	(England) (France)	Nick Matthew; Grégory Gaultier	9; 11	11; 6	11; 7	11; 7
3	(England) (France)	Peter Barker; Grégoire Marche	8; 11	11; 6	6; 11	11; 5	11; 6
4	(England) (France)	Daryl Selby; Lucas Serme						not played

== Women's tournament ==
=== Group stage ===
Group A

Pos	Team	P	W	L	Pts
1	England	3	3	0	6
2	Czech Republic	3	2	1	4
3	Netherlands	3	1	2	2
4	Switzerland	3	0	3	0

Group B

Pos	Team	P	W	L	Pts
1	France	3	2	1	6
2	(Republic of Ireland) Ireland	3	2	1	4
3	Wales	3	1	2	2
4	Denmark	3	0	3	0

=== Semi-finals ===
England
3
Semi-final 1

Ireland
0

			1	2	3	4	5
1	(England) (Republic of Ireland)	Laura Massaro; Madeline Perry	11; 9	11; 3	10; 12	0; 2
2	(England) (Republic of Ireland)	Alison Waters; Aisling Blake	11; 9	11; 3	11; 4
3	(England) (Republic of Ireland)	Sarah-Jane Perry; Ciara Moloney	11; 4	11; 1

France
2
Semi-final 2

Czech Republic
0

			1	2	3	4	5
1	(France) (Czech Republic)	Camille Serme; Olga Ertlová	11; 4	11; 3	11; 5
2	(France) (Czech Republic)	Laura Pomportes; Lucie Fialová	8; 11	12; 10	11; 9	11; 9
3	(France) (Czech Republic)	Maud Duplomb; Anna Klimundová						not played

=== Third place ===
Czech Republic
2
Third place

Ireland
1

			1	2	3	4	5
1	(Czech Republic) (Republic of Ireland)	Anna Klimundová; Ciara Moloney	11	11; 3	8; 2	11; 11
2	(Czech Republic) (Republic of Ireland)	Olga Ertlová; Aisling Blake	3; 11	11; 6	4; 11	9; 11
3	(Czech Republic) (Republic of Ireland)	Lucie Fialová; Laura Mylotte	11; 7	11; 3	11; 5

=== Final ===
England
3
Final

France
0

			1	2	3	4	5
1	(England) (France)	Sarah-Jane Perry; Cyrielle Peltier	11; 7	11; 7	11; 5
2	(England) (France)	Laura Massaro; Camille Serme	6; 11	12; 10	6; 11	8; 11
3	(England) (France)	Alison Waters; Laura Pomportes	11; 2	11; 5	11; 7
