= 2013 Women's European Individual Closed Championships =

2013 European Individual Championships

Details
- Event name: 2013 European Individual Closed Championships
- Location: Belgium Herentals
- Website www.eiccsquash.com

The 2013 Women's European Individual Closed Championships is the women's edition of the 2013 European Squash Individual Championships, which serves as the individual European championship for squash players. The event took place in Herentals in Belgium from 4 to 7 September 2013. Camille Serme won her second European Individual Championships title, defeating Natalie Grinham in the final.

== Seeds ==
1. (Netherlands) Natalie Grinham (final)
2. (France) Camille Serme (champion)
3. (Czech Republic) Lucie Fialová (quarterfinals)
4. (France) Coline Aumard (semifinals)
5. (Austria) Birgit Coufal (first round)
6. (Norway) Lotte Eriksen (quarterfinals)
7. (France) Laura Pomportes (quarterfinals)
8. (Switzerland) Gaby Huber (semifinals)

== Draw and results ==
=== Finals ===
First round
1	(Netherlands) Natalie Grinham	11	11	11
Q	(Latvia) Ineta Mackevica	9	5	3
Q	(Spain) Xisela Aranda	6	7	8
7	(France) Laura Pomportes	11	11	11
5	(Austria) Birgit Coufal	7	11	10	10
(France) Maud Duplomb	11	4	12	12
Q	(Germany) Franziska Hennes	7	8	6
4	(France) Coline Aumard	11	11	11
3	(Czech Republic) Lucie Fialová	11	11	11
Q	(Netherlands) Judith Diepeveen	2	3	8
(France) Cyrielle Peltier	8	9	8
8	(Switzerland) Gaby Huber	11	11	11
7	(Norway) Lotte Eriksen	11	11	5	11
Q	(Belgium) Nele Gilis	6	9	11	7
Q	(Netherlands) Nikki VD Heijden	3	5	4
2	(France) Camille Serme	11	11	11

Quarter finals
1	(Netherlands) Natalie Grinham	11	11	11
7	(France) Laura Pomportes	8	3	6
(France) Maud Duplomb	4	4	6
4	(France) Coline Aumard	11	11	11
3	(Czech Republic) Lucie Fialová	11	11	9	13	5
8	(Switzerland) Gaby Huber	9	9	11	15	11
7	(Norway) Lotte Eriksen	2	5	3
2	(France) Camille Serme	11	11	11

Semi finals
1	(Netherlands) Natalie Grinham	11	11	11
4	(France) Coline Aumard	3	4	4
8	(Switzerland) Gaby Huber	1	6	10
2	(France) Camille Serme	11	11	12

Final
1	(Netherlands) Natalie Grinham	3	7	11	6
2	(France) Camille Serme	11	11	4	11

Third place match
4	(France) Coline Aumard	11	11	11
8	(Switzerland) Gaby Huber	8	9	3

== See also ==
- 2013 Men's European Individual Closed Championships
- European Squash Individual Championships

Preceded by Finland (Helsinki); 2012	European Squash Championships; Belgium (Herentals); 2013	Succeeded by France (Valenciennes); 2014
