= 2014 Men's European Individual Closed Championships =

2014 European Individual Championships

Details
- Event name: 2014 European Individual Closed Championships
- Location: France Valenciennes
- Website europeansquash-valenciennes2014.fr/en

The 2014 Men's European Individual Closed Championships is the men's edition of the 2014 European Squash Individual Championships, which serves as the individual European championship for squash players. The event took place in Valenciennes in France from 4 to 7 June 2014. Grégory Gaultier won his eighth European Individual Championships title, defeating Mathieu Castagnet in the final.

== Seeds ==
1. (France) Grégory Gaultier (champion)
2. (Germany) Simon Rösner (quarterfinals)
3. (Netherlands) Laurens Jan Anjema (semifinals)
4. (France) Mathieu Castagnet (final)
5. (Switzerland) Nicolas Müller (quarterfinals)
6. (France) Grégoire Marche (semifinals)
7. (Finland) Olli Tuominen (second round)
8. (France) Lucas Serme (quarterfinals)
9. (France) Geoffrey Demont (quarterfinals)
10. (France) Joan Lezaud (second round)
11. (Spain) Carlos Cornes Ribadas (second round)
12. (France) Christophe André (second round)
13. (Czech Republic) Martin Švec (second round)
14. (Czech Republic) Petr Martin (second round)
15. (Czech Republic) Ondrej Uherka (second round)
16. (Poland) Wojciech Nowisz (first round)

== Draw and results ==
=== Finals ===
First round
1	(France) Grégory Gaultier
(Austria) Jakob Dirnberger	11	11	11
16	(Poland) Wojciech Nowisz	7	3	1
11	(Spain) Carlos Cornes Ribad.	11	11	11
(Switzerland) Michael Müller	2	6	7
(Ukraine) Ruslan Sorochynskyi	3	7	6
8	(France) Lucas Serme	11	11	11
7	(Finland) Olli Tuominen	11	11	11
(Poland) Lukasz Stachowski	5	7	7
(Norway) Sindre Snorteland	4	1	4
9	(France) Geoffrey Demont	11	11	11
14	(Czech Republic) Petr Martin	12	11	11
(Belgium) Grégory Lecerf	10	4	4
3	(Netherlands) Laurens Jan Anjema
4	(France) Mathieu Castagnet	11	11	11
(Poland) Atras Przemyslaw	5	8	4
(Poland) Moron Karwowski	3	3	3
13	(Czech Republic) Martin Švec	11	11	11
12	(France) Christophe André	11	11	11
(Netherlands) Marc Ter Sluis	4	4	8
(Ukraine) Valery Fedoruk	4	11	2	5
5	(Switzerland) Nicolas Müller	11	7	11	11
6	(France) Grégoire Marche	11	11	11
(Latvia) Karlins Pekstins	2	1	6
(Norway) Kim Are Killinberg	3	13	4
10	(France) Joan Lezaud	11	15	11
15	(Czech Republic) Ondrej Uherka
(Portugal) Claudio Pinto	w/o
2	(Germany) Simon Rösner

Second round
1	(France) Grégory Gaultier	11	11	11
(Austria) Jakob Dirnberger	3	2	7
11	(Spain) Carlos Cornes Ribadas	11	4	8	1
8	(France) Lucas Serme	8	11	11	11
7	(Finland) Olli Tuominen	11	11	7	11
9	(France) Geoffrey Demont	6	13	11	13
14	(Czech Republic) Petr Martin	6	4	2
3	(Netherlands) Laurens Jan Anjema	11	11	11
4	(France) Mathieu Castagnet	11	11	11
13	(Czech Republic) Martin Švec	3	2	5
12	(France) Christophe André	4	4	3
5	(Switzerland) Nicolas Müller	11	11	11
6	(France) Grégoire Marche	11	11	11
10	(France) Joan Lezaud	2	3	3
15	(Czech Republic) Ondrej Uherka	2	10	11	6
2	(Germany) Simon Rösner	11	12	4	11

Quarter finals
1	(France) Grégory Gaultier	11	11	11
8	(France) Lucas Serme	5	4	6
9	(France) Geoffrey Demont	2	4	2
3	(Netherlands) Laurens Jan Anjema	11	11	11
4	(France) Mathieu Castagnet	11	11	11
5	(Switzerland) Nicolas Müller	8	6	3
6	(France) Grégoire Marche	7	5	11	11	11
2	(Germany) Simon Rösner	11	11	9	6	5

Semi finals
1	(France) Grégory Gaultier	6	11	11	11
3	(Netherlands) Laurens Jan Anjema	11	5	8	6
Final
1	(France) Grégory Gaultier	11	11	4	11
4	(France) Mathieu Castagnet	5	5	11	4
4	(France) Mathieu Castagnet	11	11	11
6	(France) Grégoire Marche	9	4	5

Third place match
3	(Netherlands) Laurens Jan Anjema	11	10	11	10
6	(France) Grégoire Marche	13	12	7	12

== See also ==
- 2014 Women's European Individual Closed Championships
- European Squash Individual Championships

Preceded by Belgium (Herentals); 2013	European Squash Championships; France (Valenciennes); 2014	Succeeded by Slovakia (Bratislava); 2015
