= 2012 Women's European Individual Closed Championships =

2012 European Individual Championships

Details
- Event name: 2012 European Individual Closed Championships
- Location: Finland Helsinki
- Website www.squash.fi/eicc2012/

The 2012 Women's European Individual Closed Championships is the women's edition of the 2012 European Squash Individual Championships, which serves as the individual European championship for squash players. The event took place in Helsinki in Finland from 23 to 26 May 2012. Camille Serme won her first European Individual Championships title, defeating Natalie Grinham in the final.

== Seeds ==
1. [1*] (Netherlands) Natalie Grinham (final)
2. [2*] (France) Camille Serme (champion)
3. [3/4*] (Switzerland) Gaby Huber (semifinals)
4. [3/4*] (Czech Republic) Lucie Fialová (semifinals)
5. [5/8*] (Czech Republic) Olga Ertlová (first round)
6. [5/8*] (France) Coline Aumard (quarterfinals)
7. [5/8*] (Austria) Birgit Coufal (first round)
8. [5/8*] (Netherlands) Orla Noom (quarterfinals)

== Draw and results ==
=== Finals ===
First round
1	(Netherlands) Natalie Grinham	11	11	11
Q	(Finland) Melissa Meulenbelt	7	3	4
(Finland) Saara Voltola	5	1	7
5/8	(France) Coline Aumard	11	11	11
5/8	(Austria) Birgit Coufal	11	9	7	9
(France) Laura Pomportes	9	11	11	11
Q	(Spain) Xisela Aranda	7	3	6
3/4	(Czech Republic) Lucie Fialová	11	11	11
3/4	(Switzerland) Gaby Huber	11	11	11
Q	(Poland) Dominika Witkwska	4	3	3
Q	(France) Julia Lecoq	8	3	6
(Netherlands) Orla Noom	11	11	11
5/8	(Czech Republic) Olga Ertlová	11	2	6	5
(France) Maud Duplomb	7	11	11	11
Q	(Poland) Anne Jurkun	1	6	1
2	(France) Camille Serme	11	11	11

Quarter finals
1	(Netherlands) Natalie Grinham	11	11	11
5/8	(France) Coline Aumard	6	4	6
(France) Laura Pomportes	4	4	7
3/4	(Czech Republic) Lucie Fialová	11	11	11
3/4	(Switzerland) Gaby Huber	5	11	11	11
5/8	(Netherlands) Orla Noom	11	9	3	2
(France) Maud Duplomb	2	3	1
2	(France) Camille Serme	11	11	11

Semi finals
1	(Netherlands) Natalie Grinham	11	11	11
3/4	(Czech Republic) Lucie Fialová	7	4	6
3/4	(Switzerland) Gaby Huber	4	7	6
2	(France) Camille Serme	11	11	11

Final
1	(Netherlands) Natalie Grinham	11	6	6	9
2	(France) Camille Serme	8	11	11	11

Third place match
3/4	(Czech Republic) Lucie Fialová	11	11	8	10	11
3/4	(Switzerland) Gaby Huber	8	8	11	12	7

== See also ==
- 2012 Men's European Individual Closed Championships
- European Squash Individual Championships

Preceded by Poland (Wrasaw); 2011	European Squash Championships; Finland (Helsinki); 2012	Succeeded by Belgium (Herentals); 2013
