= 2015 Men's European Individual Closed Championships =

2015 European Individual Championships

Details
- Event name: 2015 European Individual Closed Championships
- Location: Slovakia Bratislava
- Website www.eiccbratislava2015.sk

The 2015 Men's European Individual Closed Championships is the men's edition of the 2015 European Squash Individual Championships, which serves as the individual European championship for squash players. The event took place in Bratislava in Slovakia from 27 to 30 May 2015. Grégory Gaultier won his ninth European Individual Championships title, defeating Borja Golán in the final.

== Seeds ==
1. (France) Grégory Gaultier (champion)
2. (Spain) Borja Golán (final)
3. (France) Grégoire Marche (semifinals)
4. (France) Lucas Serme (quarterfinals)
5. (Germany) Raphael Kandra (semifinals)
6. (Spain) Carlos Cornes Ribadas (quarterfinals)
7. (Slovakia) Miroslav Celler (second round)
8. (Czech Republic) Ondrej Uherka (second round)
9. (Spain) Edmon López Möller (quarterfinals)
10. (Austria) Jakob Dirnberger (quarterfinals)
11. (Czech Republic) Martin Svec (second round)
12. (Republic of Ireland) Michael Craig (second round)
13. (Czech Republic) Petr Martin (second round)
14. (Czech Republic) Daniel Mekbib (second round)
15. (Hungary) Lenard Puski (second round)
16. (Poland) Łukasz Stachowski (first round)

== Draw and results ==
=== Finals ===
First round
1 | (France) Grégory Gaultier | 11 | 11 | 11
Q | (Bulgaria) Stelian Stankov | 2 | 3 | 5
(Slovakia) Marek Manik | 7 | 11 | 6 | 4
15 | (Hungary) Lenard Puski | 11 | 8 | 11 | 11
9 | (Spain) Edmon López Möller | 11 | 11 | 11
(Italy) Yuri Farneti | 7 | 2 | 8
Q | (Slovakia) Tomas Toth | 11 | 10 | 3 | 3
8 | (Czech Republic) Ondrej Uherka | 8 | 12 | 11 | 11
5 | (Germany) Raphael Kandra | 11 | 11 | 11
Q | (Greece) Charalamp. Leontarakis | 9 | 4 | 2
(Ukraine) Ruslan Sorochynskyi | 1 | 3 | 9
11 | (Czech Republic) Martin Svec | 11 | 11 | 11
16 | (Poland) Łukasz Stachowski | 5 | 11 | 9 | 11 | 6
(Hungary) Benedek Sebök | 11 | 9 | 11 | 6 | 11
Q | (Slovakia) Peter Hrúzik | 2 | 7 | 2
4 | (France) Lucas Serme | 11 | 11 | 11
3 | (France) Grégoire Marche | 11 | 11 | 5 | 11
Q | (Switzerland) Dimitri Steinmann | 7 | 2 | 11 | 13
(Poland) Marcin Karwowski | 8 | 4 | 11 | 5
13 | (Czech Republic) Petr Martin | 11 | 11 | 9 | 11
12 | (Republic of Ireland) Michael Craig | 11 | 11 | 11
(Slovakia) Peter Kviecinsky | 2 | 4 | 8
Q | (Poland) Julian Kischel | 11 | 9 | 4
6 | (Spain) Cornes Ribadas | 13 | 11 | 11
7 | (Slovakia) Miroslav Celler | 11 | 11 | 11
Q | (Bulgaria) Kostadin Simeonov | 5 | 4 | 1
(Poland) Przemysław Atras | 5 | 7 | 1
10 | (Austria) Jakob Dirnberger | 11 | 11 | 11
14 | (Czech Republic) Daniel Mekbib | 11 | 11 | 11
(Ukraine) Valerii Fedoruk | 9 | 5 | 6
Q | (Slovakia) David Kubíček | 3 | 5 | 6
2 | (Spain) Borja Golán | 11 | 11 | 11

Second round
1 | (France) Grégory Gaultier | 11 | 11 | 11
15 | (Hungary) Lenard Puski | 6 | 5 | 5
9 | (Spain) Edmon López Möller | 11 | 11 | 11
8 | (Czech Republic) Ondrej Uherka | 9 | 7 | 9
5 | (Germany) Raphael Kandra | 11 | 11 | 11
11 | (Czech Republic) Martin Svec | 7 | 8 | 4
(Hungary) Benedek Sebök | 1 | 4 | 5
4 | (France) Lucas Serme | 11 | 11 | 11
3 | (France) Grégoire Marche | 13 | 11 | 11
13 | (Czech Republic) Petr Martin | 11 | 5 | 4
12 | (Republic of Ireland) Michael Craig | 9 | 1 | 3
6 | (Spain) Cornes Ribadas | 11 | 11 | 11
7 | (Slovakia) Miroslav Celler | 12 | 7 | 11 | 2
10 | (Austria) Jakob Dirnberger | 10 | 11 | 13 | 11
14 | (Czech Republic) Daniel Mekbib | 4 | 9 | 9
2 | (Spain) Borja Golán | 11 | 11 | 11

Quarter finals
1 | (France) Grégory Gaultier | 11 | 11 | 11
9 | (Spain) Edmon López Möller | 3 | 4 | 6
5 | (Germany) Raphael Kandra | 11 | 11 | 12 | 11
4 | (France) Lucas Serme | 6 | 8 | 14 | 6
3 | (France) Grégoire Marche | 11 | 6 | 11 | 12
6 | (Spain) Carlos Cornes Ribadas | 7 | 11 | 2 | 10
10 | (Austria) Jakob Dirnberger | 6 | 11 | 5
2 | (Spain) Borja Golán | 11 | 13 | 11

Semi finals
1 | (France) Grégory Gaultier | 11 | 11 | 11
5 | (Germany) Raphael Kandra | 5 | 3 | 8
Final
1 | (France) Grégory Gaultier | 11 | 5 | 11 | 11
2 | (Spain) Borja Golán | 3 | 11 | 7 | 5
3 | (France) Grégoire Marche | 7 | 1 | 4
2 | (Spain) Borja Golán | 11 | 11 | 11

Third place match
| 5 | (Germany) Raphael Kandra | 11 | 10 | 11 | 10 | 11 |
| 3 | (France) Grégoire Marche | 5 | 12 | 9 | 12 | 6 |

== See also ==
- 2015 Women's European Individual Closed Championships
- European Squash Individual Championships

| Preceded by France (Valenciennes); 2014 | European Squash Championships; Slovakia (Bratislava); 2015 | Succeeded by European; Championships; 2016 |
