= 2019 Men's British Open Squash Championship =

British squash competition

British Open
- Men's British Open

Details
- Event name: Allam British Open 2019
- Location: Hull, England
- Venue: University of Hull Sports Complex
- Dates: 20–26 May 2019

Men's Winner
- Prize money: $165,000
- Year: 2018–19 PSA World Tour

The Men's Allam British Open 2019 was the men's edition of the 2019 British Open Squash Championships, which is a PSA World Series event (Prize money : $165,000 ). The event takes place at the new Sports Complex at the University of Hull in Hull in England from 20 to 26 May 2019.

Mohamed El Shorbagy defeated Ali Farag in an all Egyptian final, which saw El Shorbagy win the title for the third time.

== Seeds ==
1. (Egypt) Ali Farag
2. (Egypt) Mohamed El Shorbagy
3. (Germany) Simon Rösner
4. (New Zealand) Paul Coll
5. (Egypt) Karim Abdel Gawad
6. (Colombia) Miguel Ángel Rodríguez
7. (Egypt) Mohamed Abouelghar
8. (Peru) Diego Elías

== Draw and results ==
=== Semi-finals and final ===
Semi-finals
1	(Egypt) Ali Farag	10	11	11	10	11
4	(New Zealand) Paul Coll	12	7	4	12	7
5	(Egypt) Karim Abdel Gawad	9	3	9
2	(Egypt) Mohamed El Shorbagy	11	11	11

Final
1	(Egypt) Ali Farag	9	11	5	9
2	(Egypt) Mohamed El Shorbagy	11	5	11	11

=== Main Draw ===
==== Top half ====
First round
1	(Egypt) Ali Farag
bye
(Egypt) Mostafa Asal	11	11	9	11
(Qatar) Abdulla Al-Tamimi	7	8	11	4
(Germany) Raphael Kandra
bye
(Egypt) Marwan El Shorbagy
bye
(France) Grégoire Marche
bye
(Scotland) Alan Clyne	11	6	6	2
(Spain) Borja Golán	4	11	11	11
(England) Adrian Waller	11	5	9	12	11
(England) George Parker	6	11	11	10	7
7	(Egypt) Mohamed Abouelghar
bye
8	(Peru) Diego Elías
bye
(Egypt) Mazen Hesham	7	14	6	6
(Pakistan) Tayyab Aslam	11	12	11	11
(United States) Todd Harrity	14	11	9	11
(Hong Kong) Max Lee	12	4	11	6
(Australia) Cameron Pilley	7	7	4
(France) Lucas Serme	11	11	11
(England) Joshua Masters	11	11	11
(Hong Kong) Yip Tsz Fung	8	9	9
(Egypt) Fares Dessouky	11	7	12	11	12
(France) Mathieu Castagnet	8	11	14	8	10
(Wales) Joel Makin
bye
4	(New Zealand) Paul Coll
bye

Second round
1	(Egypt) Farag	6	11	11	11
(Egypt) Asal	11	7	7	4
(Germany) Kandra	11	11	4	9	8
(Egypt) El Shorbagy	6	9	11	11	11
(France) Marche	11	11	14	11
(Spain) Golan	8	4	16	8
(England) Waller	7	5	2
7	(Egypt) Abouelghar	11	11	11
8	(Peru) Elias	11	11	11	3	5
(Egypt) Hesham	9	13	3	11	11
(United States) Harrity	11	8	3	5
(France) Serme	4	11	11	11
(England) Masters	5	10	5
(Egypt) Dessouky	11	12	11
(Wales) Makin	11	8	9	4
2	(New Zealand) Coll	9	11	11	11

Third round
1	(Egypt) Farag	11	11	11
(Egypt) El Shorbagy	8	1	2
(France) Marche	10	2	2
7	(Egypt) Abouelghar	12	11	11
(Egypt) Hesham	11	11	4	11
(France) Serme	4	6	11	7
(Egypt) Dessouky	5	7	11	5
4	(New Zealand) Coll	11	11	9	11

Quarter-finals
1	(Egypt) Farag	11	11	11
7	(Egypt) Abouelghar	8	9	4
Semi-finals
1	(Egypt) Farag	10	11	11	10	11
4	(New Zealand) Coll	12	7	4	12	7
(Egypt) Hesham	3	11	6	11	6
4	(New Zealand) Coll	11	5	11	8	11

==== Bottom half ====
First round
3	(Germany) Simon Rösner
bye
(England) Tom Richards	4	16	11	6	11
(England) Nathan Lake	11	14	8	11	9
(Egypt) Omar Mosaad
bye
(England) Declan James
bye
(Scotland) Greg Lobban	12	11	10	11
(Malaysia) Ivan Yuen	10	9	12	4
(Egypt) Zahed Salem
bye
(India) Saurav Ghosal
bye
5	(Egypt) Karim Abdel Gawad
bye
6	(Colombia) Miguel Ángel Rodríguez
bye
(New Zealand) Campbell Grayson	7	11	6	11	11
(Switzerland) Nicolas Müller	11	7	11	9	5
(Mexico) César Salazar	11	5	11	11
(England) Richie Fallows	9	11	6	4
(Egypt) Karim Ali Fathy	11	11	11
(England) Chris Simpson	9	9	3
(England) Daryl Selby	11	11	6	11
(England) Ben Coleman	9	7	11	4
(England) Patrick Rooney	11	12	11
(Malaysia) Ng Eain Yow	8	10	7
(England) James Willstrop	11	11	11
(India) Ramit Tandon	8	8	1
2	(Egypt) Mohamed El Shorbagy
bye

Second round
3	(Germany) Rösner	11	12	11
(England) Richards	3	10	6
(Egypt) Mosaad	11	11	6	w/o
(England) James	11	11	3	ret
(Scotland) Lobban	11	5	8
(Egypt) Salem	13	11	11
(India) Ghosal	9	4	11	6
5	(Egypt) Gawad	11	11	7	11
6	(Colombia) Rodríguez	11	12	7	11
(New Zealand) Grayson	3	10	11	4
(Mexico) Salazar	12	11	7	11
(Egypt) Fathy	10	9	11	9
(England) Selby	11	11	11
(England) Rooney	7	9	6
(England) Willstrop	9	9	9
2	(Egypt) El Shorbagy	11	11	11

Third round
3	(Germany) Rösner	7	11	11	11
(Egypt) Mosaad	11	9	7	4
(Egypt) Salem	6	6	12	4
5	(Egypt) Gawad	11	11	10	11
(Colombia) Rodríguez	11	10	11	11
(Mexico) Salazar	8	12	6	8
(England) Selby	3	4	2
2	(Egypt) El Shorbagy	11	11	11

Quarter-finals
3	(Germany) Rösner	8	6	12	9
5	(Egypt) Gawad	11	11	10	11
Semi-finals
5	(Egypt) Gawad	9	3	9
2	(Egypt) El Shorbagy	11	11	11
6	(Colombia) Rodríguez	6	5	9
2	(Egypt) El Shorbagy	11	11	11

== See also ==
- 2019 Women's British Open Squash Championship
- 2018–19 PSA Men's World Squash Championship
