= Open International de Squash de Nantes 2015 =

Open International de Nantes 2015
- 1st Open International de Nantes

Details
- Event name: Open International de Squash de Nantes 2015
- Location: Nantes France
- Venue: Le Lieu Unique
- Website www.opensquashnantes.fr

Men's Winner
- Category: Challenger 10
- Prize money: $10,000
- Year: World Tour 2015

The Open International de Squash de Nantes 2015 is the 2015 edition of the Open International de Squash de Nantes, which is a tournament of the PSA World Tour event Challenger (Prize money: $10,000).

The event took place at Le Lieu Unique in Nantes in France from 2 to 6 of September.

Grégoire Marche won his first Open International de Nantes trophy, beating Henrik Mustonen in the final.

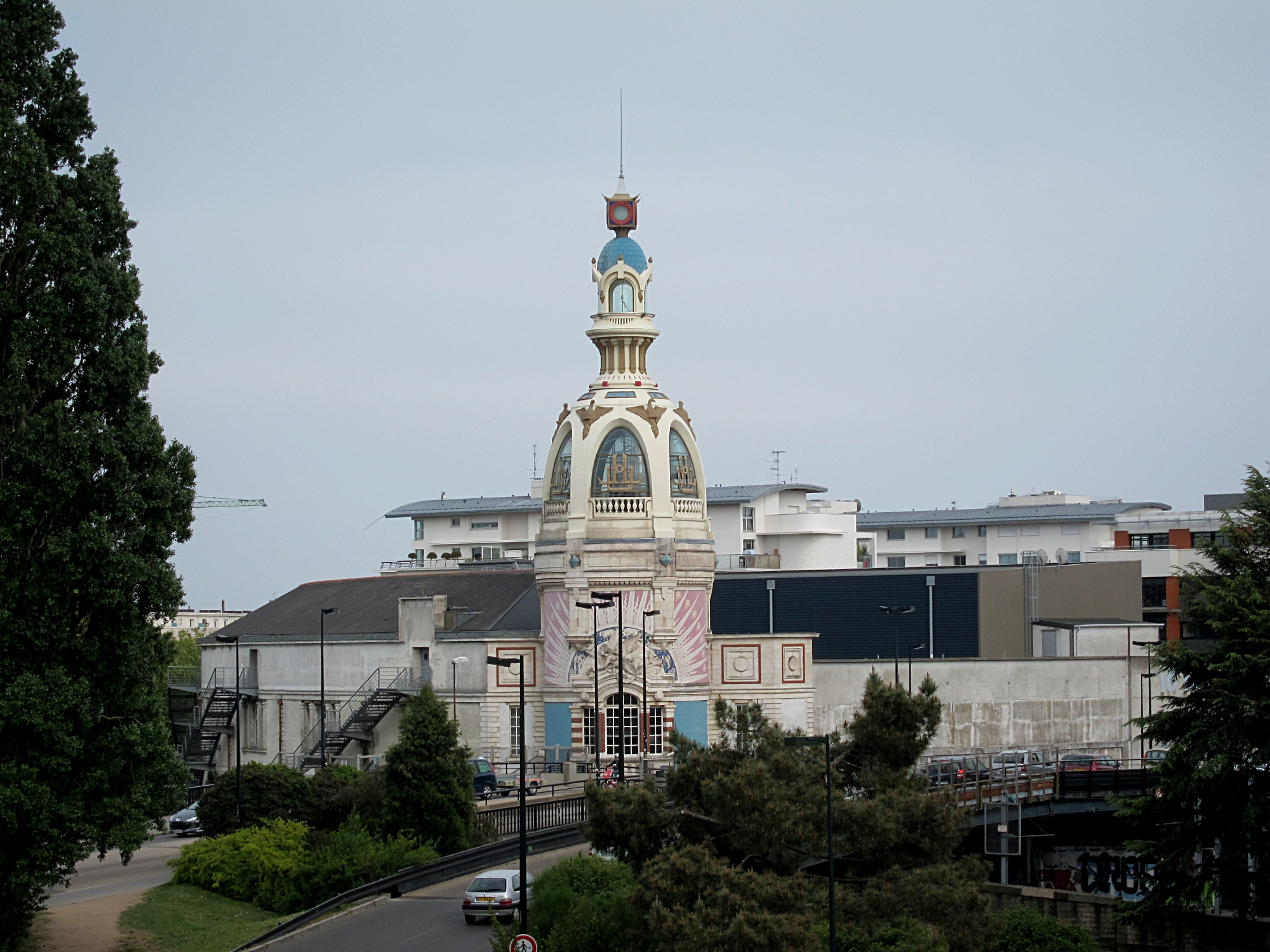
Le Lieu Unique, venue of the 1st edition

== Prize money and ranking points ==
For 2015, the prize purse was $10,000. The prize money and points breakdown is as follows:

Prize Money Open International de Nantes (2015)
Event	W	F	SF	QF	1R
Points (PSA)	175	115	70	45	25
Prize money	$1,900	$1,300	$850	$525	$300

== Seeds ==
1. (France) Grégoire Marche (champion)
2. (France) Lucas Serme (semifinals)
3. (Finland) Henrik Mustonen (final)
4. (England) Eddie Charlton (semifinals)
5. (Germany) Jens Schoor (quarterfinals)
6. (Netherlands) Piëdro Schweertman (quarterfinals)
7. (Pakistan) Khawaja Adil Maqbool (quarterfinals)
8. (France) Geoffrey Demont (first round)

== Draw and results ==
First round 2 & 3 September 2015
1	(France) Grégoire Marche	11	11	11
(Finland) Matias Tuomi	2	3	2
Q	(Belgium) Jan VD Herrewegen	13	11	11
8	(France) Geoffrey Demont	11	5	5
7	(Pakistan) Khaw. Adil Maqbool	11	12	12
Q	(England) Robert Downer	8	10	10
Q	(Spain) Iker Pajares Bernabeu	4	6	7
4	(England) Eddie Charlton	11	11	11
3	(Finland) Henrik Mustonen	7	11	11	12
(Pakistan) Muhd Saqib Yousaf	11	7	5	10
(England) George Parker	3	6	11	10
6	(Netherlands) Piëdro Schweertman	11	11	8	12
5	(Germany) Jens Schoor	11	11	11
WC	(France) Benjamin Aubert	6	8	7
Q	(Spain) Edmon López Möller	3	6	5
2	(France) Lucas Serme	11	11	11

Quarter finals 4 September 2015
1	(France) Grégoire Marche	11	11	11
Q	(Belgium) Jan VD Herrewegen	2	2	7
7	(Pakistan) Khawaja Adil Maqbool	5	6	10
4	(England) Eddie Charlton	11	11	12
3	(Finland) Henrik Mustonen	11	11	4	7	11
6	(Netherlands) Piëdro Schweertman	3	8	11	11	8
5	(Germany) Jens Schoor	9	7	8
2	(France) Lucas Serme	11	11	11

Semi finals 5 September 2015
1	(France) Grégoire Marche	11	12	11	11
4	(England) Eddie Charlton	3	14	6	4
3	(Finland) Henrik Mustonen	11	8	11	11
2	(France) Lucas Serme	8	11	9	9

Final; 6 September 2015
1	(France) Grégoire Marche	11	11	11
3	(Finland) Henrik Mustonen	8	2	9

== See also ==
- PSA World Tour 2015
- Open International de Squash de Nantes
