= 2013 European Squash Team Championships =

Squash tournament

- 41st
- Location: (Netherlands) Amsterdam
- Date: 1 – 4 May 2013
- Website europeansquash.com

Results
- Champions: Men England; Women England

The 2013 European Squash Team Championships was the 41st edition of European Squash Team Championships for squash players. The event was held in Amsterdam, Netherlands, from 1 May – 3 May 2013. The tournament was organised by the European Squash Federation.

The England men's team won their 38th title and the England women's team won their 35th title.

== Men's tournament ==
=== Group stage ===
Group A

Pos	Team	P	W	D	L	Pts
1	England	3	3	0	0	6
2	Scotland	3	1	1	1	3
3	Switzerland	3	1	0	2	2
4	Italy	3	0	1	2	1

Group B

Pos	Team	P	W	D	L	Pts
1	France	3	3	0	0	6
2	Germany	3	2	0	1	4
3	Spain	3	0	1	2	1
4	Denmark	3	0	1	3	1

=== Semi-finals ===
England
4
Semi-final 1

Germany
0

			1	2	3	4	5
1	(England) (Germany)	Peter Barker; André Haschker	11; 7	11; 7	11; 5
2	(England) (Germany)	Nick Matthew; Raphael Kandra	11; 2	11; 6	11; 4
3	(England) (Germany)	James Willstrop; Jens Schoor	11; 9	11; 5
4	(England) (Germany)	Daryl Selby; Rudolf Rohrmüller	9; 11	11; 6	11; 8

France
3
Semi-final 2

Scotland
0

			1	2	3	4	5
1	(France) (Scotland)	Grégoire Marche; Douglas Kempsell	11; 9	11; 6	11; 6
2	(France) (Scotland)	Grégory Gaultier; Alan Clyne	16; 14	11; 8	11; 8
3	(France) (Scotland)	Thierry Lincou; Greg Lobban	11; 7	11; 4
4	(France) (Scotland)	Julian Balbo; Chris Small	6; 11	11; 3				not played

=== Third place ===
Germany
2 (141)
Third place

Scotland
2 (117)

			1	2	3	4	5
1	(Germany) (Scotland)	Simon Rosner; Alan Clyne	11; 4	4; 11	9; 11	9; 11
2	(Germany) (Scotland)	Raphael Kandra; Greg Lobban	8; 11	15; 13	8; 11	11; 13
3	(Germany) (Scotland)	Jens Schoor; Douglas Kempsell	11; 3	11; 6	11; 6
4	(Germany) (Scotland)	André Haschker; Chris Small	11; 8	11; 4	11; 5

=== Final ===
England
2 (8)
Final

France
2 (6)

			1	2	3	4	5
1	(England) (France)	James Willstrop; Thierry Lincou	11; 4	12; 10	5; 11	9; 11	5; 11
2	(England) (France)	Nick Matthew; Grégory Gaultier	11; 13	6; 11	12; 14
3	(England) (France)	Daryl Selby; Lucas Serme	11; 6	11; 4	11; 9
4	(England) (France)	Peter Barker; Grégoire Marche	11; 5	11; 8	11; 9

== Women's tournament ==
=== Group stage ===
Group A

Pos	Team	P	W	L	Pts
1	England	3	3	0	6
2	Netherlands	3	2	1	4
3	Belgium	3	1	2	2
4	Germany	3	0	3	0

Group B

Pos	Team	P	W	L	Pts
1	(Republic of Ireland) Ireland	3	2	1	6
2	France	3	2	1	4
3	Czech Republic	3	1	2	2
4	Wales	3	0	3	0

=== Semi-finals ===
England
2
Semi-final 1

France
1

			1	2	3	4	5
1	(England) (France)	Laura Massaro; Camille Serme	14; 16	6; 11	11; 4	11; 9	11; 13
2	(England) (France)	Alison Waters; Cyrielle Peltier	11; 8	11; 7	9; 4	11; 11
3	(England) (France)	Jennifer Duncalf; Maud Duplomb	11; 6	11; 4	11; 4

Ireland
2
Semi-final 2

Netherlands
1

			1	2	3	4	5
1	(Republic of Ireland) (Netherlands)	Madeline Perry; Natalie Grinham	8; 11	11; 9	5; 11	5; 11
2	(Republic of Ireland) (Netherlands)	Aisling Blake; Orla Noom	11; 6	11; 8	11; 4
3	(Republic of Ireland) (Netherlands)	Laura Mylotte; Milou van der Heijden	11; 8	11; 4	6; 11	9; 11	11; 9

=== Third place ===
France
2
Third place

Netherlands
0

			1	2	3	4	5
1	(France) (Netherlands)	Camille Serme; Natalie Grinham	11; 5	11; 6	12; 10
2	(France) (Netherlands)	Coline Aumard; Orla Noom	11; 7	11; 8	11; 6
3	(France) (Netherlands)	Cyrielle Peltier; Milou van der Heijden						not played

=== Final ===
England
2
Final

Ireland
1

			1	2	3	4	5
1	(England) (Republic of Ireland)	Laura Massaro; Madeline Perry	11; 7	11; 5	11; 2
2	(England) (Republic of Ireland)	Alison Waters; Aisling Blake	6; 11	9; 11	6; 11
3	(England) (Republic of Ireland)	Jenny Duncalf; Laura Mylotte	11; 4	11; 5	11; 2
