= 2013 Men's European Individual Closed Championships =

2013 European Individual Championships

Details
- Event name: 2013 European Individual Closed Championships
- Location: Belgium Herentals
- Website www.eiccsquash.com

The 2013 Men's European Individual Closed Championships is the men's edition of the 2013 European Squash Individual Championships, which serves as the individual European championship for squash players. The event took place in Herentals in Belgium from 4 to 7 September 2013. Grégory Gaultier won his seventh European Individual Championships title, defeating Simon Rösner in the final.

== Seeds ==
1. (France) Grégory Gaultier (champion)
2. (Spain) Borja Golán (quarterfinals)
3. (Germany) Simon Rösner (final)
4. (England) Daryl Selby (first round)
5. (Netherlands) Laurens Jan Anjema (semifinals)
6. (Switzerland) Nicolas Müller (quarterfinals)
7. (England) Chris Simpson (quarterfinals)
8. (Finland) Olli Tuominen (semifinals)
9. (France) Grégoire Marche (second round)
10. (France) Mathieu Castagnet (second round)
11. (Czech Republic) Jan Koukal (second round)
12. (France) Lucas Serme (second round)
13. (Belgium) Jan Van Den Herrewegen (second round)
14. (Slovakia) Miroslav Celler (second round)
15. (Belgium) Stefan Casteleyn (second round)
16. (Netherlands) Piëdro Schweertman (quarterfinals)

== Draw and results ==
=== Finals ===
First round
1	(France) Grégory Gaultier	11	11	11
(Belgium) Grégory Lecerf	7	4	5
(Slovakia) Peter Kviecinsky	4	5	2
13	(Belgium) Jan VD Herrewegen	11	11	11
11	(Czech Republic) Jan Koukal	12	11	11
(Netherlands) Rene Mijs	10	4	4
Q	(Belgium) Joeri Hapers	5	3	7
6	(Switzerland) Nicolas Müller	11	11	11
8	(Finland) Olli Tuominen	11	11	11
Q	(Belgium) Mark Burke	4	5	3
(Norway) Kim Are Killingberg	2	4	7
9	(France) Grégoire Marche	11	11	11
16	(Netherlands) Pied. Schweertman	11	11	11
(Czech Republic) Petr Martin	5	5	7
Q	(Poland) Przemyslaw Atras
3	(England) Daryl Selby	wo
4	(Germany) Simon Rösner	11	11	11
Q	(Poland) Marcin Karwowski	9	1	5
(Czech Republic) Ondrej Ertl	9	8	11	8
15	(Belgium) Stefan Casteleyn	11	11	9	11
10	(France) Mathieu Castagnet	11	11	11
(Netherlands) Marc Ter Sluis	5	8	9
Q	(Belgium) Jan De Smet	4	4	6
7	(England) Chris Simpson	11	11	11
5	(Netherlands) Laurens Jan Anjema	11	11	11
Q	(Norway) Sindre Roaldsoy	2	7	3
(Czech Republic) Jackub Solnicky	3	2	5
12	(France) Lucas Serme	11	11	11
14	(Slovakia) Miroslav Celler	3	12	11	10	11
(Portugal) Claudio Pinto	11	6	8	12	6
Q	(Belgium) Jonas Snoeck	3	7	5
2	(Spain) Borja Golán	11	11	11

Second round
1	(France) Grégory Gaultier	11	11	11
13	(Belgium) Jan VD Herrewegen	7	5	4
11	(Czech Republic) Jan Koukal	6	8	7
6	(Switzerland) Nicolas Müller	11	11	11
8	(Finland) Olli Tuominen	11	11	11
9	(France) Grégoire Marche	6	4	3
16	(Netherlands) Pied. Schweertman	11	11	11
Q	(Poland) Przemyslaw Atras	4	4	6
4	(Germany) Simon Rösner	9	11	11	11
15	(Belgium) Stefan Casteleyn	11	9	3	3
10	(France) Mathieu Castagnet	6	5	5
7	(England) Chris Simpson	11	11	11
5	(Netherlands) Laurens Jan Anjema	7	11	11	11
12	(France) Lucas Serme	11	5	9	4
14	(Slovakia) Miroslav Celler	5	4	8
2	(Spain) Borja Golán	11	11	11

Quarter finals
1	(France) Grégory Gaultier	11	11	11
6	(Switzerland) Nicolas Müller	5	9	8
8	(Finland) Olli Tuominen	11	11	11
16	(Netherlands) Piëdro Schweertman	6	5	6
4	(Germany) Simon Rösner	11	8	11	11
7	(England) Chris Simpson	8	11	7	9
5	(Netherlands) Laurens Jan Anjema	11	8	11	11
2	(Spain) Borja Golán	7	11	6	4

Semi finals
1	(France) Grégory Gaultier	11	11	11
8	(Finland) Olli Tuominen	1	7	6
Final
1	(France) Grégory Gaultier	11	11	8	11
4	(Germany) Simon Rösner	9	4	11	3
4	(Germany) Simon Rösner	11	10	11	14
5	(Netherlands) Laurens Jan Anjema	11	12	0	12

Third place match
8	(Finland) Olli Tuominen	7	11	11	11	11
5	(Netherlands) Laurens Jan Anjema	11	5	13	9	7

== See also ==
- 2013 Women's European Individual Closed Championships
- European Squash Individual Championships

Preceded by Finland (Helsinki); 2012	European Squash Championships; Belgium (Herentals); 2013	Succeeded by France (Valenciennes); 2014
