= 2016 Men's World Open Squash Championship =

Men's World Championship 2016
- 38th PSA Men's World Squash Championship
- Location: Cairo, Egypt
- Date: October 27 – November 6, 2016
- Category: PSA World Championship
- Prize money: $325,000

Results
- Champion: (Egypt) Karim Abdel Gawad
- Runner-up: (Egypt) Ramy Ashour
- Semi-finalists: (Egypt) Mohamed El Shorbagy (France) Grégory Gaultier

The 2016 PSA Men's World Squash Championship is the men's edition of the 2016 World Championship, which serves as the individual world championship for squash players. The event took place in Cairo, Egypt from 27 October to 6 November 2016. Karim Abdel Gawad won his first World Championship title, defeating Ramy Ashour in the final.

== Prize money and ranking points ==
For 2016, the prize purse was $325,000. The prize money and points breakdown is as follows:

Prize Money World Championship (2016)
Event	W	F	SF	QF	3R	2R	1R
Points (PSA)	2890	1900	1155	700	410	205	125
Prize money	$48,000	$30,000	$18,000	$10,500	$6,000	$3,000	$1,500

== Seeds ==
1. (Egypt) Mohamed El Shorbagy (semifinals)
2. (France) Grégory Gaultier (semifinals)
3. (Egypt) Omar Mosaad (second round)
4. (England) Nick Matthew (quarterfinals)
5. (Egypt) Ramy Ashour (final)
6. (Egypt) Karim Abdel Gawad (champion)
7. (Egypt) Marwan El Shorbagy (third round)
8. (Colombia) Miguel Ángel Rodríguez (third round)
9. (France) Mathieu Castagnet (second round)
10. (Egypt) Ali Farag (quarterfinals)
11. (Egypt) Tarek Momen (quarterfinals)
12. (Germany) Simon Rösner (third round)
13. (Australia) Ryan Cuskelly (first round)
14. (Australia) Cameron Pilley (first round)
15. (Egypt) Fares Dessouky (quarterfinals)
16. (Hong Kong) Max Lee (third round)

== Draw and results ==
=== Finals ===
Quarter finals
1	(Egypt) Mohd El Shorbagy	11	11	11
10	(Egypt) Ali Farag	8	5	8
6	(Egypt) Karim Abdel Gawad	11	11	11
4	(England) Nick Matthew	9	4	9
15	(Egypt) Fares Dessouky	6	15	8	rtd
5	(Egypt) Ramy Ashour	11	17	10
11	(Egypt) Tarek Momen	5	5	16	8
2	(France) Grégory Gaultier	11	11	14	11

Semi finals
1	(Egypt) Mohd El Shorbagy	11	12	13	2	5
6	(Egypt) Karim Abdel Gawad	13	10	11	11	11
5	(Egypt) Ramy Ashour
2	(France) Grégory Gaultier	wo

Final
6	(Egypt) Karim Abdel Gawad	5	11	11	2
5	(Egypt) Ramy Ashour	11	6	7	1	rtd

=== Top half ===
==== Section 1 ====
First round
1	(Egypt) Mohd El Shorbagy	11	12	11
Q	(Australia) Rex Hedrick	7	10	9
(France) Lucas Serme	9	8	8
(Finland) Olli Tuominen	11	11	11
(Egypt) Omar Abdel Meguid	11	11	11
(Switzerland) Nicolas Müller	8	4	2
(Egypt) Karim Ali Fathi	13	2	13	11
14	(Australia) Cameron Pilley	11	11	11	6
10	(Egypt) Ali Farag	11	11	1	11
(England) Declan James	9	8	11	2
Q	(England) Jaymie Haycocks	9	11	5	11	4
(England) James Willstrop	11	9	11	9	11
(Egypt) Mohamed Reda	11	11	11
Q	(Malaysia) Eain Yow	9	9	7
Q	(India) Mahesh Mangaonkar	11	9	6	3
8	(Colombia) Miguel Á. Rodríguez	4	11	11	11

Second round
1	(Egypt) Mohd El Shorbagy	11	11	11
(Finland) Olli Tuominen	9	2	8
(Egypt) Omar Abdel Meguid	11	12	7	8	4
(Egypt) Karim Ali Fathi	7	10	11	11	11
10	(Egypt) Ali Farag	5	11	11	9	11
(England) James Willstrop	11	1	8	11	5
(Egypt) Mohamed Reda	9	9	2
8	(Colombia) Miguel Á. Rodríguez	11	11	11

Third round
1	(Egypt) Mohd El Shorbagy	11	11	11
(Egypt) Karim Ali Fathi	3	6	9
10	(Egypt) Ali Farag	11	6	11	11
8	(Colombia) Miguel Á. Rodríguez	4	11	9	7

Quarter finals
1	(Egypt) Mohd El Shorbagy	11	11	11
10	(Egypt) Ali Farag	8	5	8

==== Section 2 ====
First round
6	(Egypt) Karim Abdel Gawad	9	9	11	11	11
Q	(England) Nathan Lake	11	11	7	3	6
Q	(Egypt) Shehab Essam	3	4	4
(Egypt) Mohamed Abouelghar	11	11	11
(England) Chris Simpson	11	13	11
Q	(Botswana) Alister Walker	2	11	9
(Egypt) Zahed Mohamed	9	11	6	3
16	(Hong Kong) Max Lee	11	9	11	11
12	(Germany) Simon Rösner	11	11	11
(Peru) Diego Elías	9	2	8
Q	(Egypt) Karim El Hammamy	12	11	4	3
(Mexico) César Salazar	10	13	11	11
(Hong Kong) Leo Au	11	11	11
Q	(New Zealand) Lance Beddoes	4	4	5
(New Zealand) Campbell Grayson	7	11	4	11
4	(England) Nick Matthew	11	6	11	13

Second round
6	(Egypt) Karim Abdel Gawad	11	11	5	7	11
(Egypt) Mohamed Abouelghar	8	9	11	11	9
(England) Chris Simpson	9	6	7
16	(Hong Kong) Max Lee	11	11	11
12	(Germany) Simon Rösner	11	11	12
(Mexico) César Salazar	8	6	10
(Hong Kong) Leo Au	7	7	8
4	(England) Nick Matthew	11	11	11

Third round
6	(Egypt) Karim Abdel Gawad	7	11	11	11
16	(Hong Kong) Max Lee	11	3	6	6
12	(Germany) Simon Rösner	11	9	7	10
4	(England) Nick Matthew	6	11	11	12

Quarter finals
6	(Egypt) Karim Abdel Gawad	11	11	11
4	(England) Nick Matthew	9	4	9

=== Bottom half ===
==== Section 1 ====
First round
3	(Egypt) Omar Mosaad	11	11	11
Q	(Canada) Shawn Delierre	6	6	5
(Scotland) Alan Clyne	11	10	10	10
(Malaysia) Mohd Nafi. Adnan	9	12	12	12
(France) Grégoire Marche	11	11	12	11
WC	(Egypt) Youssef Ibrahim	13	7	10	4
(England) Joe Lee	6	6	5
15	(Egypt) Fares Dessouky	11	11	11
9	(France) Mathieu Castagnet	11	11	6	11
Q	(Egypt) Mazen Gamal	6	3	11	7
(England) Tom Richards	w/o
(England) Daryl Selby
LL	(New Zealand) Evan Williams	11	3	7
(South Africa) Stephen Coppinger	13	11	11
(United States) Todd Harrity	3	5	4
5	(Egypt) Ramy Ashour	11	11	11

Second round
3	(Egypt) Omar Mosaad	11	8	10	11	10
(Malaysia) Mohd Nafi. Adnan	6	11	12	1	12
(France) Grégoire Marche	11	5	11	9
15	(Egypt) Fares Dessouky	13	11	8	11
9	(France) Mathieu Castagnet	8	8	8
(England) Daryl Selby	11	11	11
(South Africa) Stephen Coppinger	3	6	8
5	(Egypt) Ramy Ashour	11	11	11

Third round
(Malaysia) Mohd Nafi. Adnan	11	11	6	12	6
15	(Egypt) Fares Dessouky	13	6	11	10	11
(England) Daryl Selby	6	11	5	8
5	(Egypt) Ramy Ashour	11	8	11	11

Quarter finals
15	(Egypt) Fares Dessouky	6	15	8	rtd
5	(Egypt) Ramy Ashour	11	17	10

==== Section 2 ====
First round
7	(Egypt) Marwan El Shorbagy	12	11	11
(Germany) Raphael Kandra	10	6	1
Q	(England) Joshua Masters	11	10	6	7
(England) Ben Coleman	5	12	11	11
(Qatar) Abdulla Al Tamimi	11	7	11	9	6
Q	(Egypt) Youssef Soliman	8	11	5	11	11
Q	(Wales) Peter Creed	8	10	6
11	(Egypt) Tarek Momen	11	12	11
13	(Australia) Ryan Cuskelly	7	10	11	9
Q	(Germany) Jens Schoor	11	12	8	11
Q	(Wales) Joel Makin	9	6	11	6
(Hong Kong) Tsz Fung Yip	11	11	8	11
(India) Saurav Ghosal	11	11	11	12
(England) Adrian Waller	7	13	9	10
(New Zealand) Paul Coll	6	10	11	8
2	(France) Grégory Gaultier	11	12	6	11

Second round
7	(Egypt) Marwan El Shorbagy	11	11	9	11
(England) Ben Coleman	7	4	11	3
Q	(Egypt) Youssef Soliman	7	14	3	5
11	(Egypt) Tarek Momen	11	12	11	11
Q	(Germany) Jens Schoor	12	4	9	6
(Hong Kong) Tsz Fung Yip	10	11	11	11
(India) Saurav Ghosal	7	2	3
2	(France) Grégory Gaultier	11	11	11

Third round
7	(Egypt) Marwan El Shorbagy	9	11	8	11	3
11	(Egypt) Tarek Momen	11	9	11	9	11
(Hong Kong) Tsz Fung Yip	8	2	6
2	(France) Grégory Gaultier	11	11	11

Quarter finals
11	(Egypt) Tarek Momen	5	5	16	8
2	(France) Grégory Gaultier	11	11	14	11

== See also ==
- World Championship
- 2016 Women's World Open Squash Championship

Preceded by United States (Bellevue); 2015	PSA World Championship; Egypt (Cairo); 2016	Succeeded by England (Manchester); 2017
