= 2015 Women's European Individual Closed Championships =

2015 European Individual Championships

Details
- Event name: 2015 European Individual Closed Championships
- Location: Slovakia Bratislava
- Website www.eiccbratislava2015.sk

The 2015 Women's European Individual Closed Championships is the women's edition of the 2015 European Squash Individual Championships, which serves as the individual European championship for squash players. The event took place in Bratislava in Slovakia from 27 to 30 May 2015. Camille Serme won her fourth European Individual Championships title, defeating Line Hansen in the final.

== Seeds ==
1. (France) Camille Serme (Champion)
2. (Denmark) Line Hansen (Final)
3. (Czech Republic) Lucie Fialová (Quarterfinals)
4. (France) Coline Aumard (Semifinals)
5. (Germany) Sina Wall (Quarterfinals)
6. (France) Laura Pomportes (Quarterfinals)
7. (Belgium) Nele Gilis (Semifinals)
8. (Slovakia) Linda Hruzikova (Quarterfinals)

== Draw and results ==
=== Finals ===
First round
1	(France) Camille Serme	11	11	11
Q	(Czech Republic) Eva Ferteková	4	8	4
Q	(Ukraine) Nadiya Usenko	3	3	5
5	(Germany) Sina Wall	11	11	11
7	(Belgium) Nele Gilis	11	11	11
Q	(France) Laura Gamblin	4	4	4
Q	(Hungary) Gabriella Csókási	7	2	11	9
3	(Czech Republic) Lucie Fialová	11	11	8	11
4	(France) Coline Aumard	11	11	11
Q	(Austria) Jacqueline Peychär	6	5	9
Q	(Czech Republic) Anna Klimundova	11	4	5	5
8	(Slovakia) Linda Hruzikova	9	11	11	11
5	(France) Laura Pomportes	10	11	11	11
(Belgium) Tinne Gilis	12	7	5	5
Q	(Czech Republic) Zuzana Kubanova	6	6	1
2	(Denmark) Line Hansen	11	11	11

Quarter finals
1	(France) Camille Serme	11	11	11
5	(Germany) Sina Wall	5	3	2
7	(Belgium) Nele Gilis	11	11	11
3	(Czech Republic) Lucie Fialová	6	5	2
4	(France) Coline Aumard	11	11	11
8	(Slovakia) Linda Hruzikova	5	7	4
5	(France) Laura Pomportes	5	9	4
2	(Denmark) Line Hansen	11	11	11

Semi finals
1	(France) Camille Serme	11	11	11
7	(Belgium) Nele Gilis	8	5	1
4	(France) Coline Aumard	11	9	8	10
2	(Denmark) Line Hansen	8	11	11	11

Final
1	(France) Camille Serme	12	11	11
2	(Denmark) Line Hansen	10	6	6

Third place match
7	(Belgium) Nele Gilis	6	7	9
4	(France) Coline Aumard	11	11	11

== See also ==
- 2015 Men's European Individual Closed Championships
- European Squash Individual Championships

Preceded by France (Valenciennes); 2014	European Squash Championships; Slovakia (Bratislava); 2015	Succeeded by European; Championships; 2016
