= 2012 European Squash Team Championships =

Squash tournament

- 40th
- Location: (Germany) Nuremberg
- Date: 2 – 5 May 2012
- Website europeansquash.com

Results
- Champions: Men England; Women England

The 2012 European Squash Team Championships was the 40th edition of European Squash Team Championships for squash players. The event was held in Nuremberg, Germany, from 2–3 May 2012. The tournament was organised by the European Squash Federation.

The England men's team won their 37th title and the England women's team won their 34th title.

== Men's tournament ==
=== Group stage ===
Group A

Pos	Team	P	W	D	L	Pts
1	England	3	3	0	0	6
2	Germany	3	2	0	1	4
3	Denmark	3	0	1	2	1
4	Netherlands	3	0	1	2	1

Group B

Pos	Team	P	W	D	L	Pts
1	France	3	3	0	0	6
2	Scotland	3	2	0	1	4
3	Italy	3	2	0	2	2
4	Finland	3	0	0	3	0

=== Semi-finals ===
England
4
Semi-final 1

Scotland
0

			1	2	3	4	5
1	(England) (Scotland)	Daryl Selby; Chris Small	11; 5	11; 2	11; 3
2	(England) (Scotland)	Nick Matthew; Alan Clyne	11; 5	11; 7	11; 4
3	(England) (Scotland)	Peter Barker; Greg Lobban	11; 4	11; 5	11; 1
4	(England) (Scotland)	Tom Richards; Stuart Crawford	11; 2	11; 8

France
4
Semi-final 2

Germany
0

			1	2	3	4	5
1	(France) (Germany)	Mathieu Castagnet; André Haschker	11; 8	11; 3	11; 1
2	(France) (Germany)	Grégory Gaultier; Simon Rösner	11; 2	11; 2	11; 8	15; 13
3	(France) (Germany)	Thierry Lincou; Raphael Kandra	11; 8	11; 6	9; 11	11; 2
4	(France) (Germany)	Grégoire Marche; Rudolf Rohrmüller	11; 3	11; 6

=== Third place ===
Germany
3
Third place

Scotland
1

			1	2	3	4	5
1	(Germany) (Scotland)	Simon Rösner; Alan Clyne	11; 6	11; 8	11; 4
2	(Germany) (Scotland)	Raphael Kandra; Greg Lobban	11; 2	11; 5	11; 5
3	(Germany) (Scotland)	Jens Schoor; Chris Small	7; 11	13; 15	6; 11
4	(Germany) (Scotland)	André Haschker; Stuart Crawford	11; 3	4; 11	11; 8	6; 11	11; 8

=== Final ===
England
3
Final

France
0

			1	2	3	4	5
1	(England) (France)	Daryl Selby; Grégoire Marche	11; 3	11; 13	11; 9	11; 9
2	(England) (France)	James Willstrop; Grégory Gaultier	11; 3	8; 11	11; 6	11
3	(England) (France)	Peter Barker; Mathieu Castagnet	11; 7	11; 5	11; 7
4	(England) (France)	Nick Matthew; Thierry Lincou						not played

== Women's tournament ==
=== Group stage ===
Group A

Pos	Team	P	W	L	Pts
1	England	3	3	0	6
2	France	3	2	1	4
3	Wales	3	1	2	2
4	Scotland	3	0	3	0

Group B

Pos	Team	P	W	L	Pts
1	(Republic of Ireland) Ireland	3	2	1	6
2	Germany	3	2	1	4
3	Netherlands	3	1	2	2
4	Switzerland	3	0	3	0

=== Semi-finals ===
Ireland
2
Semi-final 1

France
1

			1	2	3	4	5
1	(Republic of Ireland) (France)	Madeline Perry; Camille Serme	12; 10	12; 10	11; 5
2	(Republic of Ireland) (France)	Laura Mylotte; Maud Duplomb	8; 11	8; 11	9; 11
3	(Republic of Ireland) (France)	Aisling Blake; Coline Aumard	11; 4	6; 11	7; 11	11; 3	11; 5

England
3
Semi-final 2

Germany
0

			1	2	3	4	5
1	(England) (Germany)	Jennifer Duncalf; Pamela Hathaway	11; 3	11; 4	11; 5
2	(England) (Germany)	Alison Waters; Franziska Hannes	11; 1	11; 1	11; 7
3	(England) (Germany)	Laura Massaro; Eva Brauckmann	11; 2	11; 2

=== Third place ===
France
3
Third place

Germany
0

			1	2	3	4	5
1	(France) (Germany)	Camille Serme; Kathrin Hauck	11; 5	11; 2	11; 4
2	(France) (Germany)	Coline Aumard; Pamela Hathaway	11; 3	11; 8	11; 5
3	(France) (Germany)	Laura Pomportes; Franziska Hannes	11; 8	11; 2	11

=== Final ===
England
2
Final

Ireland
1

			1	2	3	4	5
1	(England) (Republic of Ireland)	Jenny Duncalf; Madeline Perry	11; 13	11; 7	11; 3	7; 11	8; 11
2	(England) (Republic of Ireland)	Laura Massaro; Aisling Blake	11; 1	11; 9	9; 11	11; 8
3	(England) (Republic of Ireland)	Alison Waters; Laura Mylotte	11; 2	11; 8	11; 2
