= 2017 Men's World Squash Championship =

Men's World Championship 2017
- 39th PSA Men's World Squash Championship
- Location: Manchester, England
- Venue: National Squash Centre (group stage); Manchester Central Convention Complex (knockout stage)
- Date: December 8 – 17, 2017
- Website ajbellworldchampionships.com
- Category: PSA World Championships
- Prize money: $325,000

Results
- Champion: (Egypt) Mohamed El Shorbagy
- Runner-up: (Egypt) Marwan El Shorbagy
- Semi-finalists: (France) Grégory Gaultier (Egypt) Ali Farag

The 2017 PSA Men's World Squash Championship is the men's edition of the 2017 World Squash Championships, which serves as the individual world championship for squash players. The event took place in Manchester, England from 8 to 17 December 2017.

Mohamed El Shorbagy won his first World Championship title, defeating his brother Marwan El Shorbagy in the final.

== Prize money and ranking points ==
For 2017, the prize purse was $325,000. The prize money and points breakdown is as follows:

Prize Money World Championship (2017)
Event	W	F	SF	QF	3R	2R	1R
Points (PSA)	2890	1900	1155	700	410	205	125
Prize money	$48,000	$30,000	$18,000	$10,500	$6,000	$3,000	$1,500

== Seeds ==
1. (France) Grégory Gaultier (semifinals)
2. (Egypt) Karim Abdel Gawad (quarterfinals)
3. (Egypt) Mohamed El Shorbagy (champion)
4. (Egypt) Ali Farag (semifinals)
5. (England) Nick Matthew (quarterfinals)
6. (Egypt) Marwan El Shorbagy (final)
7. (Egypt) Tarek Momen (third round)
8. (New Zealand) Paul Coll (quarterfinals)
9. (England) James Willstrop (first round)
10. (Egypt) Ramy Ashour (third round)
11. (Germany) Simon Rösner (first round)
12. (Egypt) Mohamed Abouelghar (second round)
13. (England) Daryl Selby (third round)
14. (Australia) Ryan Cuskelly (first round)
15. (Mexico) César Salazar (second round)
16. (Spain) Borja Golán (second round)

== Draw and results ==
=== Finals ===
Quarter finals
1	(France) Grégory Gaultier	11	11	11
8	(New Zealand) Paul Coll	6	5	4
5	(England) Nick Matthew	7	6	11	6
3	(Egypt) Mohamed El Shorbagy	11	11	5	11
4	(Egypt) Ali Farag	5	11	11	11
(Colombia) Miguel Ángel Rodríguez	11	6	3	6
6	(Egypt) Marwan El Shorbagy	11	11	11
2	(Egypt) Karim Abdel Gawad	8	5	9

Semi finals
1	(France) Grégory Gaultier	10	4	9
3	(Egypt) Mohamed El Shorbagy	12	11	11
4	(Egypt) Ali Farag	8	11	11	7	9
6	(Egypt) Marwan El Shorbagy	11	4	9	11	11

Final
3	(Egypt) Mohamed El Shorbagy	11	9	11	9	11
6	(Egypt) Marwan El Shorbagy	5	11	7	11	6

=== Top half ===
==== Section 1 ====
First round
1	(France) Grégory Gaultier	11	11	11
(United States) Todd Harrity	6	9	6
(Hong Kong) Yip Tsz Fung	9	11	11	11
Q	(Spain) Edmon López Möller	11	4	9	8
(England) Declan James	11	11	11	12
Q	(England) Richie Fallows	8	13	7	10
(England) Tom Richards	9	9	9
15	(Mexico) César Salazar	11	11	11
13	(England) Daryl Selby	11	11	11
(India) Mahesh Mangaonkar	8	5	5
(New Zealand) Campbell Grayson	12	11	11
(Wales) Peter Creed	10	4	10
(Scotland) Greg Lobban	11	11	11	11
(Germany) Raphael Kandra	4	13	8	5
(France) Grégoire Marche	6	8	3
8	(New Zealand) Paul Coll	11	11	11

Second round
1	(France) Grégory Gaultier	11	11	11
(Hong Kong) Yip Tsz Fung	5	6	5
(England) Declan James	8	7	13	11	11
15	(Mexico) César Salazar	11	11	11	8	4
13	(England) Daryl Selby	11	11	11
(New Zealand) Campbell Grayson	8	5	9
(Scotland) Greg Lobban	7	6	11	7
8	(New Zealand) Paul Coll	11	11	9	11

Third round
1	(France) Grégory Gaultier	11	11	11
(England) Declan James	5	3	5
13	(England) Daryl Selby	11	5	7	7	'
8	(New Zealand) Paul Coll	8	11	11	11

Quarter finals
1	(France) Grégory Gaultier	11	11	11
8	(New Zealand) Paul Coll	6	5	4

==== Section 2 ====
First round
5	(England) Nick Matthew	11	8	10	11	11
(England) George Parker	2	11	12	3	6
(Hong Kong) Max Lee	13	12	11
(Belgium) Jan Van Den Herrewegen	11	10	6
(France) Mathieu Castagnet	9	13	11	11
(Mexico) Arturo Salazar	11	11	5	5
(Qatar) Abdulla Al-Tamimi	12	11	7	11	11
11	(Germany) Simon Rösner	14	9	11	7	3
10	(Egypt) Ramy Ashour	11	11	11
(England) Joshua Masters	7	3	9
(Egypt) Omar Mosaad	11	11	11
(Egypt) Karim El Hammamy	4	5	7
(Wales) Joel Makin	11	11	11	11
(Jamaica) Christopher Binnie	13	8	8	4
(Egypt) Mazen Hesham	6	8	6
3	(Egypt) Mohamed El Shorbagy	11	11	11

Second round
5	(England) Nick Matthew	11	8	11	11
(Hong Kong) Max Lee	9	11	7	5
(France) Mathieu Castagnet	5	6	11	7
(Qatar) Abdulla Al-Tamimi	11	11	6	11
10	(Egypt) Ramy Ashour	11	11	11
(Egypt) Omar Mosaad	5	6	6
(Wales) Joel Makin	13	5	10
3	(Egypt) Mohamed El Shorbagy	15	11	12

Third round
5	(England) Nick Matthew	11	11	11
(Qatar) Abdulla Al-Tamimi	4	8	8
10	(Egypt) Ramy Ashour	12	7	4
3	(Egypt) Mohamed El Shorbagy	14	11	11

Quarter finals
5	(England) Nick Matthew	7	6	11	6
3	(Egypt) Mohamed El Shorbagy	11	11	5	11

=== Bottom half ===
==== Section 1 ====
First round
4	(Egypt) Ali Farag	11	11	11
(England) Adrian Waller	9	5	5
(Egypt) Mohammed Reda	5	11	2	11	7
(Egypt) Youssef Soliman	11	4	11	7	11
(Egypt) Karim Ali Fathy	11	11	11
(France) Baptiste Masotti	8	7	4
(Australia) Cameron Pilley	11	11	4	11
14	(Australia) Ryan Cuskelly	8	7	11	6
12	(Egypt) Mohamed Abouelghar	11	11	11
(Finland) Olli Tuominen	8	5	5
(Colombia) Miguel Ángel Rodríguez	11	11	11
(Hong Kong) Leo Au	2	6	7
(Egypt) Zahed Mohamed	11	6	11	11
(Portugal) Rui Soares	6	11	7	8
(Malaysia) Eain Yow	6	3	9
7	(Egypt) Tarek Momen	11	11	11

Second round
4	(Egypt) Ali Farag	11	11	11
(Egypt) Youssef Soliman	8	2	6
(Egypt) Karim Ali Fathy	8	8	7
(Australia) Cameron Pilley	11	11	11
12	(Egypt) Mohamed Abouelghar	11	4	11	6	5
(Colombia) Miguel Ángel Rodríguez	8	11	9	11	11
(Egypt) Zahed Mohamed	8	7	7
7	(Egypt) Tarek Momen	11	11	11

Third round
4	(Egypt) Ali Farag	11	11	11
(Australia) Cameron Pilley	4	4	4
(Colombia) Miguel Ángel Rodríguez	11	8	9	11	11
7	(Egypt) Tarek Momen	5	11	11	4	1

Quarter finals
4	(Egypt) Ali Farag	5	11	11	11
(Colombia) Miguel Ángel Rodríguez	11	6	3	6

==== Section 2 ====
First round
6	(Egypt) Marwan El Shorbagy	11	11	11
(Egypt) Omar Abdel Meguid	6	8	7
(England) Nathan Lake	6	6	9
(England) Chris Simpson	11	11	11
(France) Lucas Serme	12	11	11
(Spain) Iker Pajares Bernabeu	14	7	1	rtd
(Spain) Bernat Jaume	4	7	9
16	(Spain) Borja Golán	11	11	11
9	(England) James Willstrop	6	rtd
(India) Saurav Ghosal	11
(England) Ben Coleman	11	11	11
(India) Harinder Pal Sandhu	4	6	4
(Scotland) Alan Clyne	11	11	11
(France) Auguste Dussourd	3	7	7
(Switzerland) Nicolas Müller	11	6	5
2	(Egypt) Karim Abdel Gawad	13	11	11

Second round
6	(Egypt) Marwan El Shorbagy	11	11	8	11
(England) Chris Simpson	9	7	11	6
(France) Lucas Serme	11
16	(Spain) Borja Golán	4	rtd
(India) Saurav Ghosal	11	11	11
(England) Ben Coleman	4	3	4
(Scotland) Alan Clyne	10	11	2	3
2	(Egypt) Karim Abdel Gawad	12	8	11	11

Third round
6	(Egypt) Marwan El Shorbagy	12	11	11
(France) Lucas Serme	10	5	8
(India) Saurav Ghosal	14	5	6	7
2	(Egypt) Karim Abdel Gawad	12	11	11	11

Quarter finals
6	(Egypt) Marwan El Shorbagy	11	11	11
2	(Egypt) Karim Abdel Gawad	8	5	9

== See also ==
- World Championship
- 2017 Women's World Squash Championship

Preceded by Egypt (Cairo); 2016	PSA World Championships; England (Manchester); 2017	Succeeded by United States (Chicago); 2018–19
