= 2018–19 PSA Men's World Squash Championship =

2018–19 Men's World Championship
- 40th PSA Men's World Squash Championship
- Location: Chicago, United States
- Date: 23 February - 2 March
- Website psaworldchampionships.com
- Category: PSA World Championships

Results
- Champion: (Egypt) Ali Farag
- Runner-up: (Egypt) Tarek Momen
- Semi-finalists: (Egypt) Mohamed El Shorbagy (Germany) Simon Rösner

The 2018–19 PSA Men's World Squash Championship was the 2018–19 men's edition of the World Squash Championships, which serves as the individual world championship for squash players. The event took place in Chicago, United States from 23 February - 2 March 2019.

Ali Farag won his first world title beating Tarek Momen in the final continuing the recent Egyptian domination of the sport. Former world champion Ramy Ashour was forced to withdraw from the tournament following further injury problems.

== Seeds ==
1. (Egypt) Mohamed El Shorbagy (Semi finals)
2. (Egypt) Ali Farag (winner)
3. (Germany) Simon Rösner (Semi finals)
4. (Egypt) Tarek Momen (final)
5. (Egypt) Karim Abdel Gawad (first round)
6. (Colombia) Miguel Ángel Rodríguez (Quarter finals)
7. (New Zealand) Paul Coll (Quarter finals)
8. (Egypt) Marwan El Shorbagy (Quarter finals)
9. (Egypt) Mohamed Abouelghar (third round)
10. (Peru) Diego Elías (first round)
11. (India) Saurav Ghosal (Quarter finals)
12. (Hong Kong) Max Lee (first round)
13. (Egypt) Fares Dessouky (third round)
14. (Australia) Ryan Cuskelly (third round)
15. (Germany) Raphael Kandra (first round)
16. (England) James Willstrop (third round)

== Draw and results ==
=== Finals ===
Quarter finals
1	(Egypt) Mohamed El Shorbagy	5	11	11	11
6	(Colombia) Miguel Ángel Rodríguez	11	7	6	6
8	(Egypt) Marwan El Shorbagy	5	4	6
4	(Egypt) Tarek Momen	11	11	11
3	(Germany) Simon Rösner	11	11	11
11	(India) Saurav Ghosal	8	7	6
7	(New Zealand) Paul Coll	8	7	11	1
2	(Egypt) Ali Farag	11	11	4	11

Semi finals
1	(Egypt) Mohamed El Shorbagy	11	6	11	4	8
4	(Egypt) Tarek Momen	8	11	8	11	11
3	(Germany) Simon Rösner	2	9	4
2	(Egypt) Ali Farag	11	11	11

Final
4	(Egypt) Tarek Momen	5	13	11	3
2	(Egypt) Ali Farag	11	11	13	11

== Main draw ==
=== Top half ===
First round
1	(Egypt) Mohamed El Shorbagy	11	8	11	11
(England) Joshua Masters	7	11	8	5
(Mexico) César Salazar	11	11	5	11
(Mexico) Arturo Salazar	9	7	11	9
(New Zealand) Campbell Grayson	8	11	11	11
(England) Nathan Lake	11	6	5	4
(Hong Kong) Leo Au	11	11	9	11
15	(Germany) Raphael Kandra	9	9	11	3
16	(England) James Willstrop	11	11	11
(Malaysia) Ivan Yuen	4	4	6
(Pakistan) Tayyab Aslam	9	2	5	6
(France) Victor Crouin	9	11	11	11
(Scotland) Alan Clyne	11	11	8	11
L	(Czech Republic) Daniel Mekbib	9	4	11	2
L	(India) Ramit Tandon	3	6	8
6	(Colombia) Miguel Ángel Rodríguez	11	11	11
8	(Egypt) Marwan El Shorbagy	11	11	11
(France) Mathieu Castagnet	9	13	3
(France) Grégoire Marche	11	8	11	11
(Scotland) Greg Lobban	17	11	4	7
L	(Egypt) Youssef Ibrahim	12	11	11	11
(Switzerland) Nicolas Müller	11	10	10	5
(Finland) Olli Tuominen+	8	6	7
14	(Australia) Ryan Cuskelly	11	11	11
9	(Egypt) Mohamed Abouelghar	7	11	3	11	11
(England) Declan James	11	10	11	7	5
(Pakistan) Shahjahan Khan	10	7	11
L	(England) Chris Simpson	12	11	13
(England) Tom Richards	11	11	11
(Spain) Edmon López Möller	7	0	6
L	(United States) Todd Harrity	5	11	4	6
4	(Egypt) Tarek Momen	11	9	11	11

Second round
1	(Egypt) Mohamed El Shorbagy	10	11	11	11
(Mexico) César Salazar	11	4	8	8
(New Zealand) Campbell Grayson	10	10	2
(Hong Kong) Leo Au	11	11	11
16	(England) James Willstrop	11	9	11	11
(France) Victor Crouin	6	11	5	3
(Scotland) Alan Clyne	7	7	5
6	(Colombia) Miguel Ángel Rodríguez	11	11	11
8	(Egypt) Marwan El Shorbagy	4	11	11	11
(France) Grégoire Marche	11	8	8	6
L	(Egypt) Youssef Ibrahim	11	9	6	11	9
14	(Australia) Ryan Cuskelly	13	11	11	8	11
9	(Egypt) Mohamed Abouelghar	11	13	11	8	11
(England) Chris Simpson	13	11	8	11	5
(England) Tom Richards	11	2	4	9
4	(Egypt) Tarek Momen	8	11	11	11

Third Round
1	(Egypt) Mohamed El Shorbagy	11	11	11
(Hong Kong) Leo Au	7	3	6
16	(England) James Willstrop	14	2	11	9	8
6	(Colombia) Miguel Ángel Rodríguez	12	11	7	11	11
8	(Egypt) Marwan El Shorbagy	11	11	9	11
14	(Australia) Ryan Cuskelly	4	7	11	7
9	(Egypt) Mohamed Abouelghar	11	4	11	11	3
4	(Egypt) Tarek Momen	5	11	8	11	11

Quarter finals
1	(Egypt) Mohamed El Shorbagy	6	11	11	11
6	(Colombia) Miguel Ángel Rodríguez	11	7	6	6
Semi finals
1	(Egypt) Mohamed El Shorbagy	11	6	11	4	8
4	(Egypt) Tarek Momen	8	11	8	11	11
8	(Egypt) Marwan El Shorbagy	5	4	6
4	(Egypt) Tarek Momen	11	11	11

=== Bottom half ===
First round
3	(Germany) Simon Rösner	11	11	11
(Egypt) Omar Mosaad	8	2	7
(India) Vikram Malhotra	9	8	4
(England) Richie Fallows	11	11	11
(Spain) Borja Golán	9	11	11	11	11
(Australia) Rex Hedrick	11	11	4	10	3
(England) Ben Coleman	11	6	11	11	11
12	(Hong Kong) Max Lee	10	11	12	11	9
11	(India) Saurav Ghosal	11	11	11
L	(Switzerland) Dimitri Steinmann	3	5	3
(Egypt) Karim El Hammamy	8	1	5
(France) Lucas Serme	11	11	11
(Wales) Joel Makin	11	9	4	11	11
(Hong Kong) Yip Tsz Fung	6	11	11	8	9
(Egypt) Youssef Soliman	9	6	11	11	11
5	(Egypt) Karim Abdel Gawad	11	11	8	8	9
7	(New Zealand) Paul Coll	11	9	11	11
(Egypt) Karim Ali Fathy	6	11	3	3
L	(Jamaica) Christopher Binnie	5	5	3
(Australia) Cameron Pilley	11	11	11
(Egypt) Mohamed Reda	9	11	13	11
(Malaysia) Nafiizwan Adnan	11	4	11	6
(Malaysia) Eain Yow	5	5	10
13	(Egypt) Fares Dessouky	11	11	12
10	(Peru) Diego Elías	11	9	9	10
(England) Adrian Waller	5	11	11	11
(Egypt) Zahed Salem	8	11	11	9	6
(Egypt) Mazen Hesham	11	7	9	11	11
(Wales) Peter Creed	6	11	6	11	7
(Egypt) Mostafa Asal	11	7	11	9	11
(England) Daryl Selby	2	5	4
2	(Egypt) Ali Farag	11	11	11

Second round
3	(Germany) Simon Rösner	11	11	11
(England) Richie Fallows	3	5	9
(Spain) Borja Golán	11	11	4	11
(England) Ben Coleman	5	6	11	7
11	(India) Saurav Ghosal	11	11	11
(France) Lucas Serme	11	6	8
(Wales) Joel Makin	11	7	11	9	11
(Egypt) Youssef Soliman	6	11	8	11	7
7	(New Zealand) Paul Coll	11	11	11
(Australia) Cameron Pilley	6	9	5
(Egypt) Mohamed Reda	11	4	3	7
13	(Egypt) Fares Dessouky	10	11	11	11
(England) Adrian Waller	11	6	7	4
(Egypt) Mazen Hesham	7	11	11	11
(Egypt) Mostafa Asal	1	4	2
2	(Egypt) Ali Farag	11	11	11

Third Round
3	(Germany) Simon Rösner	9	11	10	11	11
(Spain) Borja Golán	11	7	11	5	5
11	(India) Saurav Ghosal	11	11	11	11
(Wales) Joel Makin	11	7	7	12
7	(New Zealand) Paul Coll	11	11	6	11
13	(Egypt) Fares Dessouky	5	6	11	8
(Egypt) Mazen Hesham	4	4	9
2	(Egypt) Ali Farag	11	11	11	'

Quarter finals
3	(Germany) Simon Rösner	11	11	11
11	(India) Saurav Ghosal	8	7	6
Semi finals
3	(Germany) Simon Rösner	2	9	4
2	(Egypt) Ali Farag	11	11	11
7	(New Zealand) Paul Coll	8	7	11	1
2	(Egypt) Ali Farag	11	11	4	11

+ Tuominen replaced Ashour

== See also ==
- World Squash Championships
- 2018–19 PSA Women's World Squash Championship

Preceded by England (Manchester); 2017	PSA World Championships; United States (Chicago); 2018–19	Succeeded by Qatar (Doha); 2019–20
