= European Squash Individual Championships =

Squash tournament

European Individual Championships

Details
- Event name: European Individual Closed Championships
- Website; European Squash Championships

Men's Winner
- Most recent champion(s): (France) Victor Crouin (4)

Women's Winner
- Most recent champion(s): (Belgium) Tinne Gilis (4)

The European Individual Closed Championships (EICC) are the event which serves as the individual European championship for squash players organised by the European Squash Federation. The European Individual Championships was first held in 1990.

== Past results ==
=== Men's championship ===
Year	Champion	Runner-pp	Score	Third-place	Location	ref
1990	(England) Chris Walker	(Wales) Adrian Davies	3–0	-	(Netherlands) Rotterdam	
1992	(England) Chris Walker	(England) Jason Nicolle	6–9, 9–0, 9–1, 9–2	-	(Netherlands) Rotterdam	
1993	(England) Chris Walker	(England) Danny Meddings	-	-	(France) Lille	
1994–2003 No competition
2004	(France) Grégory Gaultier	(Scotland) John White	10–8, 2–9, 2–9, 9–3, 9–6	(England) Adrian Grant	(Slovakia) Bratislava	
2005	(France) Grégory Gaultier	(Czech Republic) Jan Koukal	9–5, 9–0, 9–1	(England) Peter Barker	(Czech Republic) Prague	
2006	(France) Grégory Gaultier	(Spain) Borja Golán	9–2, 9–0, 10–8	(France) Renan Lavigne	(Hungary) Budapest	
2007	(France) Grégory Gaultier	(France) Renan Lavigne	9–0, 9–1, 9–1	(France) Thierry Lincou	(France) Royan	
2008	(France) Grégory Gaultier	(France) Thierry Lincou	11–7, 6–11, 11–7, 4–11, 11–4	(Netherlands) Laurens Jan Anjema	(Slovakia) Bratislava	
2009	(France) Thierry Lincou	(France) Grégory Gaultier	12–10, 8–3 ret.	(Netherlands) Laurens Jan Anjema	(Belgium) Herentals	
2010	(France) Thierry Lincou	(France) Grégory Gaultier	11–5, 11–2 ret.	(Finland) Olli Tuominen	(Germany) Saarbrücken	
2011	(France) Grégory Gaultier	(France) Thierry Lincou	9–11, 11–6, 11–3, 11–7	(Netherlands) Laurens Jan Anjema	(Poland) Warsaw	
2012	(Finland) Olli Tuominen	(Spain) Borja Golán	11–8, 11–9, 11–3	(Germany) Simon Rösner	(Finland) Helsinki	
2013	(France) Grégory Gaultier	(Germany) Simon Rösner	11–9, 11–4, 8–11, 11–3	(Finland) Olli Tuominen	(Belgium) Herentals	
2014	(France) Grégory Gaultier	(France) Mathieu Castagnet	11–5, 11–5, 4–11, 11–4	(France) Grégoire Marche	(France) Valenciennes	
2015	(France) Grégory Gaultier	(Spain) Borja Golán	11–3, 5–11,11–7, 11–5	(Germany) Raphael Kandra	(Slovakia) Bratislava	
2016	(Spain) Borja Golán	(France) Grégory Gaultier	10–12, 11–7, 11–4, 3–11, 11–9	(France) Lucas Serme	(Czech Republic) Prague	
2017	(England) James Willstrop	(France) Grégory Gaultier	7–11, 11–8, 11–8, 2–11, 11–8	(Spain) Borja Golán	(England) Nottingham	
2018	(Spain) Borja Golán	(England) George Parker	8–11, 11–4, 10–12, 13–11, 11–6	(Germany) Raphael Kandra	(Austria) Graz	
2019	(Germany) Raphael Kandra	(Spain) Borja Golán	11–6, 11–8, 7–11, 7–11, 12–10	(Switzerland) Nicolas Müller	(Romania) Bucharest	
2020–2021 Cancelled due to COVID-19 pandemic in Europe					(Czech Republic) Prague	
2022	(Switzerland) Nicolas Müller	(France) Victor Crouin	11–7, 11–4, 11–4	(France) Sébastien Bonmalais	(Germany) Hamburg	
2023	(France) Victor Crouin	(France) Auguste Dussourd	11–3, 12–10, 9–11, 11–8	Not Awarded	(Poland) Wrocław	
2024	(France) Victor Crouin	(Switzerland) Dimitri Steinmann	11–6, 11–6, 11–7	(Spain) Iker Pajares	(Spain) Cuenca	
2025	(France) Victor Crouin	(France) Baptiste Masotti	10–12, 11–3, 11–9, 11–5	(Spain) Iker Pajares	(France) Chartres	
2026	(France) Victor Crouin	(Switzerland) Dimitri Steinmann	11–2, 11–7, 12–10	(Spain) Iván Pérez	(Hungary) Budapest	

=== Women's championship ===
Year	Champion	Runner-up	Score	Third-place	Location	ref
1990	(Scotland) Senga Macfie	(Netherlands) Babette Hoogendoorn	9–5, 4–9, 5–9, 9–2, 9–4	-	(Netherlands) Rotterdam	
1992	(England) Martine Le Moignan	(Germany) Sabine Schöne	9–3, 9–7, 9–7	-	(Netherlands) Rotterdam	
1993	(France) Corinne Castets	(Germany) Simone Korell	-	-	(France) Lille	
1994–2003 No competition
2004	(England) Rebecca Botwright	(England) Vicky Lankester	8–10, 2–9, 9–4, 9–4, 9–5	(England) Sarah Kippax	(Slovenia) Bratislava	
2005	(Netherlands) Vanessa Atkinson	(England) Linda Elriani	9–7, 9–7, 9–3	(England) Rebecca Botwright	(Czech Republic) Prague	
2006	(England) Jenny Duncalf	(England) Laura Massaro	9–2, 9–5, 9–0	(France) Isabelle Stoehr	(Hungary) Budapest	
2007	(England) Jenny Duncalf	(England) Tania Bailey	9–5, 3–9, 9–7, 9–5	(France) Isabelle Stoehr	(France) Royan	
2008	(France) Isabelle Stoehr	(England) Sarah Kippax	5–11, 11–6, 11–7, 11–4	(Italy) Manuela Manetta	(Slovenia) Bratislava	
2009	(Netherlands) Natalie Grinham	(Netherlands) Vanessa Atkinson	9–11, 11–3, 11–5, 11–4	(England) Laura Massaro	(Belgium) Herentals	
2010	(England) Jenny Duncalf	(Netherlands) Vanessa Atkinson	11–8, 11–5, 9–11, 10–12, 11–5	(France) Camille Serme	(Germany) Saarbrücken	
2011	(Netherlands) Natalie Grinham	(France) Camille Serme	7–11, 11–3, 11–9, 11–5	(England) Emma Beddoes	(Poland) Warsaw	
2012	(France) Camille Serme	(Netherlands) Natalie Grinham	8–11, 11–6, 11–6, 11–9	(Czech Republic) Lucie Fialová	(Finland) Helsinki	
2013	(France) Camille Serme	(Netherlands) Natalie Grinham	11–3, 11–7, 4–11, 11–6	(France) Coline Aumard	(Belgium) Herentals	
2014	(France) Camille Serme	(Denmark) Line Hansen	11–6, 11–5, 11–4	(Czech Republic) Lucie Fialová	(France) Valenciennes	
2015	(France) Camille Serme	(Denmark) Line Hansen	12–10, 11–6, 11–6	(France) Coline Aumard	(Slovakia) Bratislava	
2016	(France) Camille Serme	(Belgium) Nele Gilis	8–11, 11–7, 11–4, 11–5	(Belgium) Tinne Gilis	(Czech Republic) Prague	
2017	(France) Camille Serme	(England) Millie Tomlinson	11–1, 11–3, 11–3	(Belgium) Nele Gilis	(England) Nottingham	
2018	(England) Millie Tomlinson	(France) Coline Aumard	11–9, 12–10, 4–11, 11–7	(Belgium) Nele Gilis	(Austria) Graz	
2019	(Belgium) Nele Gilis	(France) Coline Aumard	9–11, 11–9, 11–8, 13–11	(France) Mélissa Alves	(Romania) Bucharest	
2020–2021 Cancelled due to COVID-19 pandemic in Europe					(Czech Republic) Prague	
2022	(Belgium) Tinne Gilis	(Belgium) Nele Gilis	11–9, 11–9, 11–9	(France) Mélissa Alves	(Germany) Hamburg	
2023	(Belgium) Nele Gilis	(France) Énora Villard	11–1, 11–7, 11–3	Not Awarded	(Poland) Wrocław	
2024	(Belgium) Tinne Gilis	(France) Mélissa Alves	11–4, 11–8, 9–11, 11–9	(Finland) Emilia Soini	(Spain) Cuenca	
2025	(Belgium) Tinne Gilis	(Belgium) Nele Gilis	11–4, 12–10, 8–11, 11–5	(France) Mélissa Alves	(France) Chartres	
2026	(Belgium) Tinne Gilis	(Belgium) Nele Gilis	12–10, 11–7, 14–12	(Ukraine) Alina Bushma	(Hungary) Budapest	

=== Statistics ===
==== Men ====
9	(France) Grégory Gaultier

4	(France) Victor Crouin

3	(England) Chris Walker

2	(Spain) Borja Golán

2	(France) Thierry Lincou

1	(Germany) Raphael Kandra

1	(Switzerland) Nicolas Müller

1	(Finland) Olli Tuominen

1	(England) James Willstrop

==== Women ====
6	(France) Camille Serme

4	(Belgium) Tinne Gilis

3	(England) Jenny Duncalf

2	(Netherlands) Natalie Grinham

2	(Belgium) Nele Gilis

1	(England) Millie Tomlinson

== See also ==
- European Squash Federation
- European Squash Team Championships
- World Open
