= Gamblin =

Gamblin is a surname. Notable people with the surname include:

- Derek Gamblin, English amateur footballer, who played as a full back
- Jacques Gamblin (born 1957), French actor
- Kip Gamblin (born 1975), Australian ballet dancer and actor
- Laura Gamblin (born 1998), French squash player
- Lucien Gamblin (1890–1972), French international football player

== See also ==
- A Gamblin Fool, 1920 short Western film released by Universal Film Mfg. Co.
- Bill's Gamblin Hall and Saloon, casino and hotel located on the Las Vegas Strip in Paradise, Nevada
- Gambling
- Gembling
