= 2012 Men's European Individual Closed Championships =

2012 European Individual Championships

Details
- Event name: 2012 European Individual Closed Championships
- Location: Finland Helsinki
- Website www.squash.fi/eicc2012/

The 2012 Men's European Individual Closed Championships is the men's edition of the 2012 European Squash Individual Championships, which serves as the individual European championship for squash players. The event took place in Helsinki in Finland from 23 to 26 May 2012. Olli Tuominen won his first European Individual Championships title, defeating Borja Golán in the final.

== Seeds ==
1. [1*] (Germany) Simon Rösner (Semifinal)
2. [2*] (Spain) Borja Golán (Final)
3. [3/4*] (Finland) Olli Tuominen (Champion)
4. [3/4*] (Switzerland) Nicolas Müller (Quarterfinal)
5. [5/8*] (France) Mathieu Castagnet (Semifinal)
6. [5/8*] (France) Grégoire Marche (Quarterfinals)
7. [5/8*] (Finland) Henrik Mustonen (Quarterfinals)
8. [5/8*] (France) Julien Balbo (Quarterfinals)

== Draw and results ==
=== Finals ===
First round
1	(Germany) Simon Rösner
(Ukraine) Rus. Sorochynskyi	11	11	5	11
(Czech Republic) Martin Svec	3	3	11	3
(Finland) Matias Tuomi	11	11	7	11
(Poland) Wojciech Nowisz	8	8	11	6
(Finland) Jaakko Vähämaa	4	3	3
5/8	(France) Grégoire Marche	11	11	11
5/8	(France) Julien Balbo	11	11	11
(Ukraine) Sergey Belyaev	4	1	4
(Ukraine) Konst. Rybalchenko	7	7	5
(Netherlands) Frank Hartkoren	11	11	11
(Netherlands) Bart Ravelli	11	11	11
(Russia) Alexey Severinov	0	4	8
(Czech Republic) Ondrej Uherka	6	7	4
3/4	(Finland) Olli Tuominen	11	11	11
3/4	(Switzerland) Nicolas Müller
(Ukraine) Denys Podvornyi	1	7	9
(Netherlands) Sebastiaan Weenink	11	11	11
(Netherlands) Piëdro Schweertman	11	6	8	11	10
(Czech Republic) Daniel Mekbib	8	11	11	6	12
(Finland) Janne Järvinen	8	6	9
5/8	(France) Mathieu Castagnet	11	11	11
5/8	(Finland) Henrik Mustonen	11	11	11
(Russia) Dmitry Ivanov	3	2	1
(Poland) Marcin Karwowski	3	2	7
(Austria) Aqeel Rehman	11	11	11
(Czech Republic) Roman Svec	11	11	11
(Finland) Tatu Knuutila	4	2	8
2	(Spain) Borja Golán

Second round
1	(Germany) Simon Rösner	11	11	11
(Ukraine) Rus. Sorochynskyi	4	3	9
(Finland) Matias Tuomi	3	4	9
5/8	(France) Grégoire Marche	11	11	11
5/8	(France) Julien Balbo	5	11	11	11
(Netherlands) Frank Hartkoren	11	6	3	4
(Netherlands) Bart Ravelli	12	11	3	9
3/4	(Finland) Olli Tuominen	14	5	11	11
3/4	(Switzerland) Nicolas Müller	11	11	11
(Netherlands) Sebastiaan Weenink	7	6	3
(Czech Republic) Daniel Mekbib	2	2	10
5/8	(France) Mathieu Castagnet	11	11	12
5/8	(Finland) Henrik Mustonen	11	9	11	11
(Austria) Aqeel Rehman	6	11	2	7
(Czech Republic) Roman Svec	4	6	8
2	(Spain) Borja Golán	11	11	11

Quarter finals
1	(Germany) Simon Rösner	8	8	11	11	11
5/8	(France) Grégoire Marche	11	11	4	5	4
5/8	(France) Julien Balbo	7	9	8
3/4	(Finland) Olli Tuominen	11	11	11
3/4	(Switzerland) Nicolas Müller	3	11	6	4
5/8	(France) Mathieu Castagnet	11	7	11	11
5/8	(Finland) Henrik Mustonen	1	5	7
2	(Spain) Borja Golán	11	11	11

Semi finals
1	(Germany) Simon Rösner	9	11	3	4
3/4	(Finland) Olli Tuominen	11	6	11	11
Final
3/4	(Finland) Olli Tuominen	11	11	11
2	(Spain) Borja Golán	8	9	3
5/8	(France) Mathieu Castagnet	8	9	4
2	(Spain) Borja Golán	11	11	11

Third place match
1	(Germany) Simon Rösner	6	11	13	11
5/8	(France) Mathieu Castagnet	11	7	11	7

== See also ==
- 2012 Women's European Individual Closed Championships
- European Squash Individual Championships

Preceded by Poland (Wrasaw); 2011	European Squash Championships; Finland (Helsinki); 2012	Succeeded by Belgium (Herentals); 2013
