= Serme =

Serme is a surname. Notable people with the surname include:

- Anna Serme (born 1991), Czech squash player
- Camille Serme (born 1989), French squash player
- Lucas Serme (born 1990), French squash player
