= 2019 Women's British Open Squash Championship =

British Open Squash tournament

British Open
- Women's British Open

Details
- Event name: Allam British Open 2019
- Location: Hull, England
- Venue: University of Hull Sports Complex

Women's Winner
- Prize money: $165,000
- Year: 2018–19 PSA World Tour

The Women's Allam British Open 2019 was the women's edition of the 2019 British Open Squash Championships, which is a 2018–19 PSA World Tour event (Prize money : 165,000 $). The event takes place at the new Sports Complex at the University of Hull in Hull in England from 20 to 26 May.

Egyptian Nouran Gohar defeated the French fourth seed Camille Serme in the final, which saw Gohar (seeded seventh) becoming the lowest seed to win the tournament in the modern era. It was a well deserved victory because she beat the number 1 and 3 seeds (Raneem El Weleily and Nour El Tayeb) on the way to the final.

== Seeds ==
1. (Egypt) Raneem El Weleily
2. (Egypt) Nour El Sherbini
3. (Egypt) Nour El Tayeb
4. (France) Camille Serme
5. (New Zealand) Joelle King
6. (England) Sarah-Jane Perry
7. (Egypt) Nouran Gohar
8. (England) Laura Massaro
9. (Wales) Tesni Evans
10. (England) Alison Waters
11. (Hong Kong) Annie Au
12. (United States) Amanda Sobhy
13. (England) Victoria Lust
14. (Egypt) Salma Hany Ibrahim Ahmed
15. (India) Joshna Chinappa
16. (Egypt) Hania El Hammamy

== Draw and results ==
=== Semi-finals and final ===
Semi-finals
7	(Egypt) Nouran Gohar	11	11	6	11
3	(Egypt) Nour El Tayeb	9	2	11	9
4	(France) Camille Serme	12	7	11	13
6	(England) Sarah-Jane Perry	10	11	6	11

Final
7	(Egypt) Nouran Gohar	11	11	6	11
4	(France) Camille Serme	9	2	11	9

=== Main Draw ===
==== Top half ====
First round
1	(Egypt) Raneem El Weleily
bye
(England) Jenny Duncalf	11	9	11	12
(Egypt) Rowan Elaraby	6	11	9	10
(Canada) Samantha Cornett	11	9	11	7	12
(South Africa) Alexandra Fuller	9	11	9	11	10
12	(United States) Amanda Sobhy
bye
14	(Egypt) Salma Hany
bye
(Hong Kong) Joey Chan	11	11	11
(New Zealand) Amanda Landers-Murphy	6	3	9
(Wales) Emily Whitlock	11	11	11
(Hong Kong) Liu Tsz Ling	9	7	8
7	(Egypt) Nouran Gohar
bye
5	(New Zealand) Joelle King
bye
(Malaysia) Low Wee Wern	11	11	11
(England) Fiona Moverley	6	3	6
(Egypt) Yathreb Adel	11	11	11
(United States) Haley Mendez	8	7	6
10	(England) Alison Waters
bye
11	(Hong Kong) Annie Au
bye
(United States) Olivia Fiechter	8	12	11	7	11
(Egypt) Zeina Mickawy	11	10	6	11	7
(Malaysia) Nicol David	11	11	13
(Hong Kong) Ho Tze-Lok	7	5	11
3	(Egypt) Nour El Tayeb
bye

Second round
1	(Egypt) El Weleily	11	11	11
(England) Duncalf	2	6	4
(Canada) Cornett	4	5	3
12	(United States) Sobhy	11	11	11
14	(Egypt) Hany	11	6	11	9	7
(Hong Kong) Chan	7	11	4	11	11
(Wales) Whitlock	3	1	3
7	(Egypt) Gohar	11	11	11
5	(New Zealand) King	11	11	11
(Malaysia) Wern	6	4	8
(Egypt) Adel	9	11	8	8
10	(England) Waters	11	4	11	11
11	(Hong Kong) Au	3	ret
(United States) Fietcher	0	w/o
(Malaysia) David	4	7	13	5
3	(Egypt) El Tayeb	11	11	11	11

Third round
1	(Egypt) El Weleily	12	11	11
12	(United States) Sobhy	10	6	6
(Hong Kong) Chan	5	8	3
7	(Egypt) Gohar	11	11	11
5	(New Zealand) King	11	11	11
10	(England) Waters	4	8	6
11	(Hong Kong) Au	13	11	9	4	11
3	(Egypt) El Tayeb	11	7	11	11	13

Quarter-finals
1	(Egypt) El Weleily	9	7	5
7	(Egypt) Gohar	11	11	11
Semi-finals
7	(Egypt) Gohar	11	11	6	11
3	(Egypt) El Tayeb	9	2	11	9
5	(New Zealand) King	8	3	6
3	(Egypt) El Tayeb	11	11	11

==== Bottom half ====
First round
4	(France) Camille Serme
bye
(Scotland) Lisa Aitken	11	11	11
(Netherlands) Milou van der Heijden	4	8	7
(Egypt) Mariam Metwally	5	11	7	1
(England) Julianne Courtice	11	5	11	11
9	(Wales) Tesni Evans
bye
16	(Egypt) Hania El Hammamy
bye
(England) Lucy Turmel	4	8	5
(Belgium) Nele Gilis	11	11	11
(Australia) Rachael Grinham	5	5	6
(Belgium) Tinne Gilis	11	11	11
8	(England) Laura Massaro
bye
6	(England) Sarah-Jane Perry
bye
(England) Jasmine Hutton	11	11	11
(Canada) Hollie Naughton	7	4	8
(England) Millie Tomlinson	10	13	13	11	11
(Canada) Danielle Letourneau	12	11	15	2	5
15	(India) Joshna Chinappa
bye
13	(England) Victoria Lust
bye
(France) Mélissa Alves	4	3	11	9
(United States) Olivia Clyne	11	11	9	11
(Egypt) Mayar Hany	2	11	9	11	11
(France) Coline Aumard	11	5	11	6	6
2	(Egypt) Nour El Sherbini
bye

Second round
4	(France) Serme	8	11	11	11
(Scotland) Aitken	11	3	5	3
(England) Courtice	6	11	11	7	10
9	(Wales) Evans	11	7	7	11	12
16	(Egypt) El Hammamy	8	6	11	11	7
(Belgium) Gilis N	11	11	6	5	11
(Belgium) Gilis T	11	2	11	11
8	(England) Massaro	5	11	5	7
6	(England) Perry	11	11	11
(England) Hutton	6	3	3
(England) Tomlinson	10	3	9
15	(India) Chinappa	12	11	11
13	(England) Lust	11	9	6	11	11
(United States) Clyne	7	11	11	6	9
(Egypt) Hany	5	4	7
2	(Egypt) El Sherbini	11	11	11

Third round
4	(France) Serme	11	11	11	11
9	(Wales) Evans	8	5	13	5
(Belgium) Gilis N	11	11	11	11
(Belgium) Gilis T	2	9	13	3
6	(England) Perry	11	9	11	11
15	(India) Chinappa	6	11	5	8
13	(England) Lust	6	5	5
2	(Egypt) El Sherbini	11	11	11

Quarter-finals
4	(France) Serme	11	14	13
(Belgium) Gilis N	4	12	11
Semi-finals
4	(France) Serme	12	7	11	13
6	(England) Perry	10	11	6	11
6	(England) Perry	8	14	11	11
2	(Egypt) El Sherbini	11	12	7	8

== See also ==
- 2019 Men's British Open Squash Championship
- 2018–19 PSA Women's World Squash Championship
