= Edmon López Möller =

Spanish squash player (born 1996)

Personal information
- Born: 16 July 1996 (age 30) Barcelona, Spain
- Height: 1.77 m (5 ft 10 in)
- Weight: 73 kg (161 lb)

Sport
- Country: Spain
- Turned pro: 2012
- Coached by: Iván Flores
- Retired: Active
- Racquet used: Hit Rackets

Men's singles
- Highest ranking: No. 48 (October 2020)
- Current ranking: No. 177 (April 2025)

Edmon López Möller (born 16 July 1996) is a Spanish professional squash player. He reached a career high ranking of 48 in the world during October 2020.

== Career ==
López played at the 2013 Under 17 Dutch Junior Open Squash, Open International de Squash de Nantes 2015, 2015 Men's European Individual Closed Championships quarterfinals, 2017 Men's World Squash Championship, and 2018–19 PSA Men's World Squash Championship.

In 2024, López won his 12th PSA title after securing victory in the Oban Open during the 2024–25 PSA Squash Tour. In April 2025, López won his 13th PSA title after securing victory in the Club Euro Sport.
