= Derek Gamblin =

English footballer

Personal information
- Date of birth: 7 April 1943 (age 83)
- Place of birth: Havant, England
- Position: Full back

Senior career*
Years	Team	Apps	(Gls)
- Sutton United
1965–1966	Portsmouth	1	(0)
- Sutton United
1968–1970	Slough Town	25	(0)
- Leatherhead
- Winchester City
1971–1974	Wycombe Wanderers	53	(1)
Total		79+	(1+)

International career
	England amateur	29	
- Great Britain
- * Club domestic league appearances and goals

Derek Gamblin (born 7 April 1943) was an English amateur footballer who played as a full back.

== Club career ==
Born in Havant, Gamblin played non-league football for Sutton United, Slough Town, Leatherhead, Winchester City, and Wycombe Wanderers. He also made one appearance in the Football League for Portsmouth during the 1965–66 season.

== International career ==
Gamblin earned 29 caps for the England amateur national team. He was also a member of the British national side which failed to qualify for the 1972 Summer Olympics.
