= Laura Mylotte =

Irish squash player (born 1975)

Personal information
- Nationality: Irish
- Born: 5 August 1975 (age 50) Birmingham, England

Sport
- Handedness: Right Handed
- Turned pro: 2004
- Retired: 2008
- Racquet used: Wilson

Women's singles
- Highest ranking: No. 43 (November 2007)
- Title: 1
- Tour final: 2
Medal record
European Team Championships
Bronze medal – third place	2005 Amsterdam	Team
Silver medal – second place	2012 Nuremberg	Team
Silver medal – second place	2013 Amsterdam	Team
Bronze medal – third place	2015 Herning	Team
Irish Championships
Gold medal – first place	2005, 2016	singles

Laura Mylotte (born 5 August 1975) is an English-born former professional squash player who represented Ireland and reached a career-high world ranking of No. 43 in November 2007. She was twice champion of Ireland.

== Biography ==
Born in Birmingham, England, Mylotte represented the Ireland women's national squash team. She won four medals with the team at the European Squash Team Championships.

In 2005, she won her first national title at the Irish National Squash Championships and won a second seven years later in 2012.
