= Joan Lezaud =

French squash player (born 1985)

Personal information
- Born: 6 November 1985 (age 40) Arcachon, France
- Height: 1.70 m (5 ft 7 in)
- Weight: 57 kg (126 lb)

Sport
- Country: France
- Turned pro: 2004
- Coached by: Andre Delhoste
- Retired: 2014
- Racquet used: Dunlop
- Highest ranking: No. 97 (November 2013)
- Title: 1
- Tour final: 4
- Updated on August 2014

Joan Lezaud (born 6 November 1985 in Arcachon) is a professional squash player who represented France. He reached a career-high world ranking of World No. 97 in November 2013.
