= Mark Andrew Burke =

Australian squash player (born 1969)

Mark Andrew Burke (born 3 September 1969 in Sydney, Australia) is an Australian squash player. As of December 2014, he resides in Petegem-aan-de-Schelde, Belgium.

Burke played squash professionally from 1997 to 2004. He achieved his highest World Tour ranking of 97 in January 2002. He represented Belgium (dual nationality) from 2009 to 2013 at the European Team Championships.

Burke operates a coaching business, Burkesquash.com.
