= Khawaja Adil Maqbool =

Pakistani squash player

Personal information
- Full name: Khawaja Adil Maqbool
- Born: April 5, 1988 (age 38) Abu Dhabi, UAE
- Height: 1.73 m (5 ft 8 in)
- Weight: 81 kg (179 lb)
- Website: adil-maqbool.com

Sport
- Country: Pakistan
- Handedness: Right Handed
- Turned pro: 2003
- Coached by: Maqbool Khawaja
- Retired: Active
- Racquet used: Harrow

Men's singles
- Highest ranking: No. 65 (November 2008)
- Current ranking: No. 106 (August 2015)
- Tour final: 1
- Updated on August 2015

Khawaja Adil Maqbool (born April 5, 1988 in Abu Dhabi) is a Pakistani professional squash player. Maqbool is based in Dubai, United Arab Emirates. He is the current UAE's No. 1 squash player, a position he has held since 2003.

== Career ==
In 1991, aged 3 he started training in Abu Dhabi under the supervision of his father, Maqbool Khawaja, and has been training with him ever since. Maqbool was a well established junior player on international junior squash circuit who at the age of 15 years had already won more than 17 international junior titles.

He was the youngest ever winner of the Abu Dhabi Men’s Open at the age of 12, a title he has now won a record 10 times. He also holds the record of being the youngest UAE National Men's Number 1 at the age of 13 and of being unbeaten in the UAE national circuit for over a decade. He is the highest ever world ranking player to be born in the UAE, in both the Junior and Senior World Squash Circuits.

In 1999/2000 Maqbool was ranked No. 1 in the ESF International Rankings in the Under 13 category, which was followed by the No. 1 ranking in the Under 15 and 17 categories in 2002/2002 and 2003 respectively.

In 2003 at the age of 15 he had already achieved the No. 1 position in ESF International Junior Under 17 Ranking and at the same time had started the International Senior World Circuit (PSA Circuit). The same year he quit the junior circuit, and only started participating in PSA circuit events, starting off at ranking of 200+ within a year and a half he broke into the top 100’s. Adil Maqbool achieved his career-high PSA ranking of World No. 65 in November 2008.

Maqbool has a Bachelors (Hons) in Computer Science from the University of Bedfordshire, UK. He is married with three children, two sons and a daughter.
