= Muhammad Saqib Yousaf =

Pakistani squash player (born 1991)

Personal information
- Born: December 5, 1991 (age 34) Lahore, Pakistan
- Height: 1.84 m (6 ft 0 in)
- Weight: 74 kg (163 lb)

Sport
- Country: Pakistan
- Handedness: Right Handed
- Turned pro: 2010
- Coached by: Zahid Butt
- Retired: Active

Men's singles
- Highest ranking: No. 104 (December 2014)
- Current ranking: No. 117 (August 2015)
- Title: 1
- Tour final: 2
- Updated on August 2015

Muhammad Saqib Yousaf (Urdu: محمد ثاقب یوسف; born December 5, 1991, in Lahore) is a professional squash player who represented Pakistan. He reached a career-high world ranking of World No. 104 in December 2014.
