= Ondřej Ertl =

Czech squash player (born 1987)

Personal information
- Born: 22 July 1987 (age 39) Klatovy, Czech Republic
- Height: 1.76 m (5 ft 9 in)
- Weight: 74 kg (163 lb)

Sport
- Country: Czech Republic
- Turned pro: 2005
- Retired: Active
- Racquet used: Oliver

Men's singles
- Highest ranking: No. 164 (May 2013)
- Current ranking: No. 172 (June 2013)
- Updated on June 2013

Ondřej Ertl (born 22 July 1987 in Klatovy) is a professional squash player who represented Czech Republic. He reached a career-high world ranking of World No. 164 in May 2013.
