= Carlos Cornes Ribadas =

Spanish squash player (born 1989)

Personal information
- Born: April 29, 1989 (age 37) Santiago de Compostela
- Height: 1.86 m (6 ft 1 in)
- Weight: 75 kg (165 lb)

Sport
- Country: Spain
- Handedness: Right Handed
- Turned pro: 2008
- Coached by: Iago Cornes & Jesus Souto
- Retired: 2020
- Racquet used: Titan

Men's singles
- Highest ranking: No. 68 (February 2020)
- Title: 7
- Tour final: 10
- Updated on January 2022

Carlos Cornes Ribadas (born April 29, 1989, in Spain in Santiago de Compostela) is a former professional squash player who represented Spain. He reached a career-high world ranking of World No. 68 in February 2020.
