= Miroslav Celler =

Slovak squash player (1991–2023)

Personal information
- Born: 7 May 1991 Bratislava, Czech and Slovak Federative Republic
- Died: 7 January 2023 (aged 31) Bratislava, Slovakia
- Height: 1.86 m (6 ft 1 in)
- Weight: 74 kg (163 lb)

Sport
- Country: Slovakia
- Turned pro: 2010
- Retired: Retired
- Racquet used: Dunlop

Men's singles
- Highest ranking: No. 178 (April 2015)
- Updated on August 2016

Miroslav Celler (7 May 1991 – 7 January 2023) was a Slovak professional squash player. He reached a career-high world ranking of World No. 178 in April 2015.

Celler was raised in Bratislava's municipal borough of Petržalka. Celler was an alumnus of Haanova Street Gymnázium and he graduated from Slovak University of Technology. He specialised in sustainable planning and landscaping. Prior to his accidental death, he worked with the Ministry of Justice of the Slovak Republic to implement judicial reform and modernise courthouse infrastructure under Next Generation EU recovery and resilience plans. Celler died on 7 January 2023, after falling down a staircase at a Bratislava nightclub. He was 31.
