= Joshua Masters =

English squash player (born 1995)

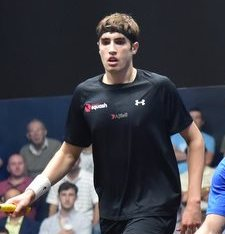
- Masters, 2017

Personal information
- Born: 6 April 1995 (age 31) Maidstone, England

Sport
- Country: England
- Turned pro: 2013
- Coached by: Hadrian Stiff
- Racquet used: Unsquashable
- Highest ranking: No. 50 (May, 2018)
- Current ranking: No. 53 (November, 2018)
- World Open: 1R (2016, 2017)
- Updated on July, 2018

Joshua Masters (born 6 April 1995 in Maidstone) is an English professional squash player. As of November 2018, he was ranked number 53 in the world.
