= Laura Gamblin =

French squash player (born 1998)

Personal information
- Born: 26 March 1998 (age 28) Senlis, France
- Height: 155 cm (5 ft 1 in)
- Weight: 56 kg (123 lb)

Sport
- Country: France
- Coached by: Philippe Signoret and Stéphane Fungere
- Retired: Active
- Racquet used: Tecnifibre

Women's singles
- Highest ranking: No. 168 (November 2017)
- Current ranking: No. 168 (November 2017)
- Updated on February, 2018

Laura Gamblin (born 26 March 1998 in Senlis) is a French professional squash player. As of November 2017, she was ranked number 168 in the world. She has competed in the main draw of multiple professional PSA tournaments, and won a European championship.
