= Geoffrey Demont =

French squash player (born 1991)

Personal information
- Nickname: Geoff
- Born: 19 March 1991 (age 35) Saint-Germain-en-Laye, France
- Height: 1.85 m (6 ft 1 in)
- Weight: 76 kg (168 lb)

Sport
- Country: France
- Turned pro: 2010
- Coached by: Renan Lavigne; Thomas Adriaens
- Retired: 2018
- Racquet used: Tecnifibre Carboflex 130
- Highest ranking: No. 82 (November, 2016)
- Title: 1
- Tour final: 4
- Updated on August 2018

Geoffrey Demont (born 19 March 1991 in Saint-Germain-en-Laye) is a professional squash player who represented France. He reached a career-high world ranking of World No. 82 in November 2016.
