= Franziska Hennes =

German squash player (born 1992)

Personal information
- Born: 21 April 1992 (age 34) Homburg, Germany

Sport
- Country: Germany
- Handedness: Right Handed
- Turned pro: 2013
- Retired: Active
- Racquet used: Victor

Women's singles
- Highest ranking: No. 105 (May 2014)
- Updated on February 2018

Franziska Hennes (born 21 April 1992 in Homburg) is a professional squash player who represents Germany. She reached a career-high world ranking of World No. 105 in May 2014. In 2013, 2014, 2017 and 2018, she won the German Nationals. In 2020, she was the runners-up against Saskia Beinhard.
