= Lotte Eriksen =

Norwegian squash player (born 1987)

Personal information
- Born: 24 January 1987 (age 39) Stavanger, Norway

Sport
- Country: Norway
- Turned pro: 2006
- Retired: Active
- Racquet used: Eye

Women's singles
- Highest ranking: No. 53 (December 2014)
- Current ranking: No. 109 (January 2018)
- Updated on January 2018

Lotte Eriksen (born 24 January 1987, in Stavanger) is a professional squash player who represents Norway. She reached a career-high world ranking of World No. 53 in December 2014.

She has been part of the Norwegian national team in several European Championships. In the singles, she was in the main draw in 2011, 2013 and 2014 and achieved her best result in 2013 when she reached the quarter-finals. She was Norwegian national champion 15 times in a row from 2005 to 2019.
