= André Haschker =

German squash player (born 1983)

Personal information
- Born: 16 February 1983 (age 43) Dresden, Germany
- Height: 1.870 m (6 ft 2 in)
- Weight: 70 kg (150 lb)

Sport
- Country: Germany
- Turned pro: 2005
- Coached by: Ralf Brandt
- Retired: Active
- Racquet used: Tecnifibre

Men's singles
- Highest ranking: No. 135 (May 2009)
- Current ranking: No. 139 (June 2013)
- Tour final: 2
- Updated on June 2013

André Haschker (born 16 February 1983 in Dresden) is a professional squash player who represents Germany. He reached a career-high world ranking of World No. 135 in May 2013.
