= Ondřej Uherka =

Czech squash player (born 1991)

Personal information
- Born: 24 September 1991 (age 34) Uherské Hradiště, Czechoslovakia

Sport
- Country: Czech Republic
- Handedness: Right Handed
- Retired: Active
- Racquet used: Wilson

Men's singles
- Highest ranking: No. 133 (February 2018)
- Current ranking: No. 133 (February 2018)
- Updated on February, 2018

Ondřej Uherka (born 24 September 1991 in Uherské Hradiště) is a Czech professional squash player. As of February 2018, he was ranked number 133 in the world. He is in the Czech Republic men's national squash team.
