= Martin Švec (squash player) =

Czech squash player (born 1994)

Martin Svec
Personal information
- Born: 24 October 1994 (age 31) Brno, Czech Republic
- Height: 190 cm (6 ft 3 in)

Sport
- Country: Czech Republic
- Handedness: left handed
- Retired: Active
- Racquet used: Salming
- Highest ranking: No. 65 (Jun 2023)
- Current ranking: No. 76 (April 2024)
- Title: 3
- Tour final: 12
- Updated on April 2024

Martin Svec (born 24 October 1994 in Brno) is a Czech professional squash player. As of Jun 2023, he was ranked number 65 in the world. He won the 2018 Keith Grainger Memorial UCT Open.
