= Olga Ertlová =

Czech squash player (born 1986)

Olga Ertlova
Personal information
- Born: 10 January 1986 (age 40) Klatovy, Czech Republic

Sport
- Country: Czech Republic
- Handedness: Right Handed
- Turned pro: 2004
- Retired: Active
- Racquet used: Harrow

Women's singles
- Highest ranking: No. 44 (1 May 2012)
- Current ranking: No. 50 (November 2012)
- Title: 1
- Tour final: 2
- Updated on May 2012

Olga Ertlova (born 10 January 1986 in Klatovy) is a professional squash player who represents Czech Republic. She reached a career-high world ranking of World No. 43 in January 2014.
