= Petr Martin =

Czech squash player (born 1989)

Personal information
- Born: 21 June 1989 (age 37) Prague, Czech Republic

Sport
- Country: Czech Republic
- Turned pro: 2007
- Coached by: Ian Thomas & Jonah Barrington

Men's singles
- Highest ranking: No. 168 (May, 2010)
- Updated on June 2013

Petr Martin (born 21 June 1989 in Prague) is a professional squash player who represented Czech Republic. He reached a career-high world ranking of World No. 168 in May 2010.Besides these things, he is also the coach of Pavel Rak, a prominent squash player in the 50+ category.
