= Gaby Huber =

Swiss squash player (born 1980)

Personal information
- Born: 7 August 1980 (age 45) Zurich, Switzerland
- Height: 170 cm (5 ft 7 in)

Sport
- Country: Switzerland
- Handedness: Right Handed
- Turned pro: 2010
- Retired: 2013
- Racquet used: Harrow

Women's singles
- Highest ranking: No. 29 (January, 2012)
- Title: 2
- Tour final: 4
- Updated on November, 2012

Gaby Huber (born 7 August 1980 in Zurich) is a professional squash player who represents Switzerland. She reached a career-high world ranking of World No. 29 in January, 2012. She has won the Swiss national championship six times: 2007, 2009, 2010, 2011, 2012, 2013 and 2014.
