= Birgit Coufal =

Austrian squash player (born 1985)

Personal information
- Born: 21 June 1985 (age 41) Vienna, Austria

Sport
- Country: Austria
- Handedness: Right Handed
- Turned pro: 2007
- Coached by: Clemens Wallishauser; Eva Bieler
- Retired: Active
- Racquet used: Karakal

Women's singles
- Highest ranking: No. 52 (June 2013)
- Current ranking: No. 65 (November 2012)
- Title: 2
- Tour final: 2
- Updated on June 2013

Birgit Coufal (born 21 June 1985 in Vienna) is a professional squash player who represents Austria. She reached a career-high world ranking of World No. 52 in June 2013.
