= Ben Coleman (squash player) =

English squash player (born 1991)

Personal information
- Born: 13 April 1991 (age 35) Chelmsford, England
- Height: 1.79 m (5 ft 10 in)

Sport
- Country: England
- Turned pro: 2009
- Coached by: Paul Carter
- Retired: 2024
- Racquet used: Tecnifibre

Men's singles
- Highest ranking: No. 45 (May 2018)
- Title: 11
- Tour final: 22
- Updated on January 2024

Ben Coleman (born 13 April 1991 in Chelmsford) is a retired professional squash player who represented England. He reached a career-high world ranking of World No. 45 in May 2018.
