= Anna Serme =

Czech squash player (born 1991)

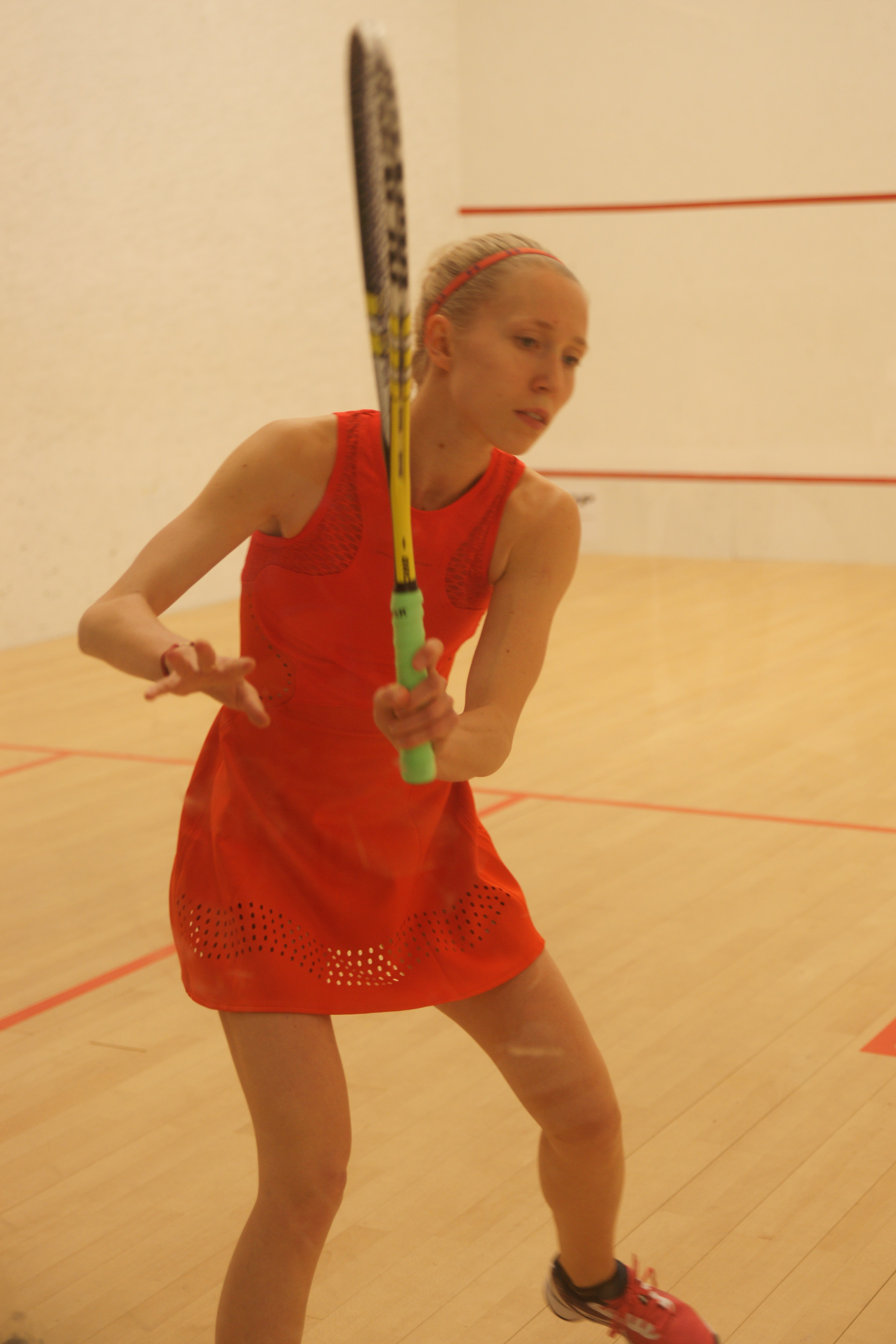
- Anna Serme, Monte Carlo Squash Classic 2018

Personal information
- Born: 15 May 1991 (age 35) Krnov, Czech Republic

Sport
- Country: Czech Republic
- Handedness: Left-handed
- Turned pro: 2010
- Retired: Active
- Racquet used: Unsquashable

Women's singles
- Highest ranking: No. 38 (March 2022)
- Current ranking: No. 77 (September 2024)
- Updated on May, 2022

Anna Serme (born 15 May 1991 in Krnov), previously known as Anna Klimundová, is a Czech professional squash player. As of September 2024, she was ranked No. 77 in the world. She is married to French squash player Lucas Serme.
