= Cyrielle Peltier =

French squash player (born 1992)

Personal information
- Born: 30 March 1992 (age 34) Le Mans, France

Sport
- Country: France
- Handedness: Right Handed
- Turned pro: 2010
- Coached by: Benoît Letourneau
- Retired: Active
- Racquet used: Prince

Women's singles
- Highest ranking: No. 51 (November 2015)
- Current ranking: No. 55 (January 2016)
- Updated on January 2016

Cyrielle Peltier (born 30 March 1992 in Le Mans) is a professional squash player who represents France. She reached a career-high world ranking of World No. 51 in November 2015.
