= Karim Ali Fathy =

Egyptian squash player (born 1993)

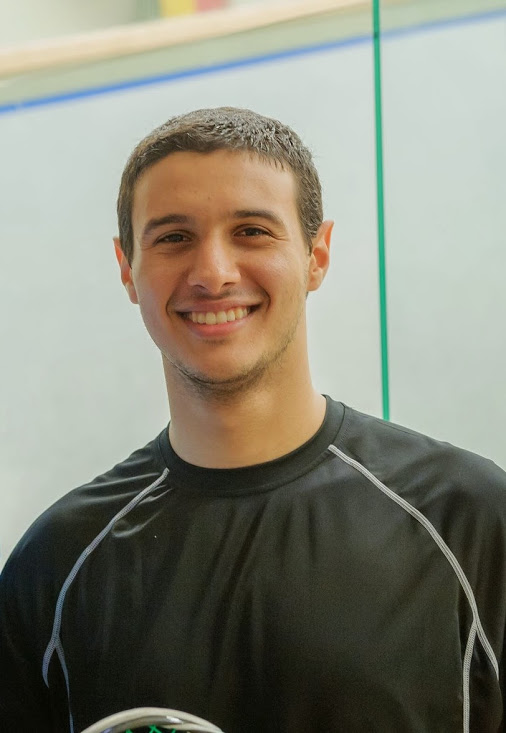
- Karim Ali Fathy, 2013

Personal information
- Born: May 30, 1993 (age 33) Egypt
- Height: 180 cm (5 ft 11 in)
- Weight: 70 kg (154 lb)

Sport
- Country: Egypt
- Handedness: Right Handed
- Turned pro: 2009
- Coached by: Wael El Batran
- Retired: Active
- Racquet used: Harrow

Men's singles
- Highest ranking: No. 35 (June, 2017)
- Current ranking: No. 35 (June, 2017)
- Title: 9
- Updated on June, 2017

Karim Ali Fathy (born May 30, 1993) is a professional squash player who represents Egypt.

== Career ==
Fathy won the prestigious British Junior Open Under-13 category in 2007 and one year later won the Under-15 category by defeating Nasir Iqbal in the final. He was World No. 340 in March 2009. As of October 2013, Fathy reached a world ranking of World No. 39 after taking the Madison Open of the US state of Wisconsin, beating Englishman Joel Hinds 3–2.
