= Jens Schoor =

German squash player (born 1987)

Personal information
- Born: 27 April 1987 (age 39) Koblenz, West Germany
- Height: 1.82 m (6 ft 0 in)
- Weight: 74 kg (163 lb)

Sport
- Country: Germany
- Handedness: Right Handed
- Turned pro: 2006
- Coached by: Davide Bianchetti
- Retired: Active
- Racquet used: Dunlop

Men's singles
- Highest ranking: No. 60 (March 2015)
- Current ranking: No. 85 (January 2017)
- Title: 11
- Tour final: 15
- Updated on January 2017

Jens Schoor (born 27 April 1987 in Koblenz) is a professional squash player who represents Germany. He reached a career-high world ranking of no. 60 in March 2015.
