= Maud Duplomb =

French squash player (born 1985)

Personal information
- Born: 31 October 1985 (age 40) Annonay, France

Sport
- Country: France
- Handedness: Right Handed
- Turned pro: 2004
- Coached by: Yann Menegaux
- Retired: 2014
- Racquet used: Dunlop

Women's singles
- Highest ranking: No. 62 (July 2012)
- Current ranking: No. 90 (January, 2015)
- Tour final: 1
- Updated on November, 2014

Maud Duplomb (born 31 October 1985 in Annonay) is a former professional squash player who represents France. She reached a career-high world ranking of World No. 62 in July 2012.
