= Laura Pomportes =

French squash player (born 1986)

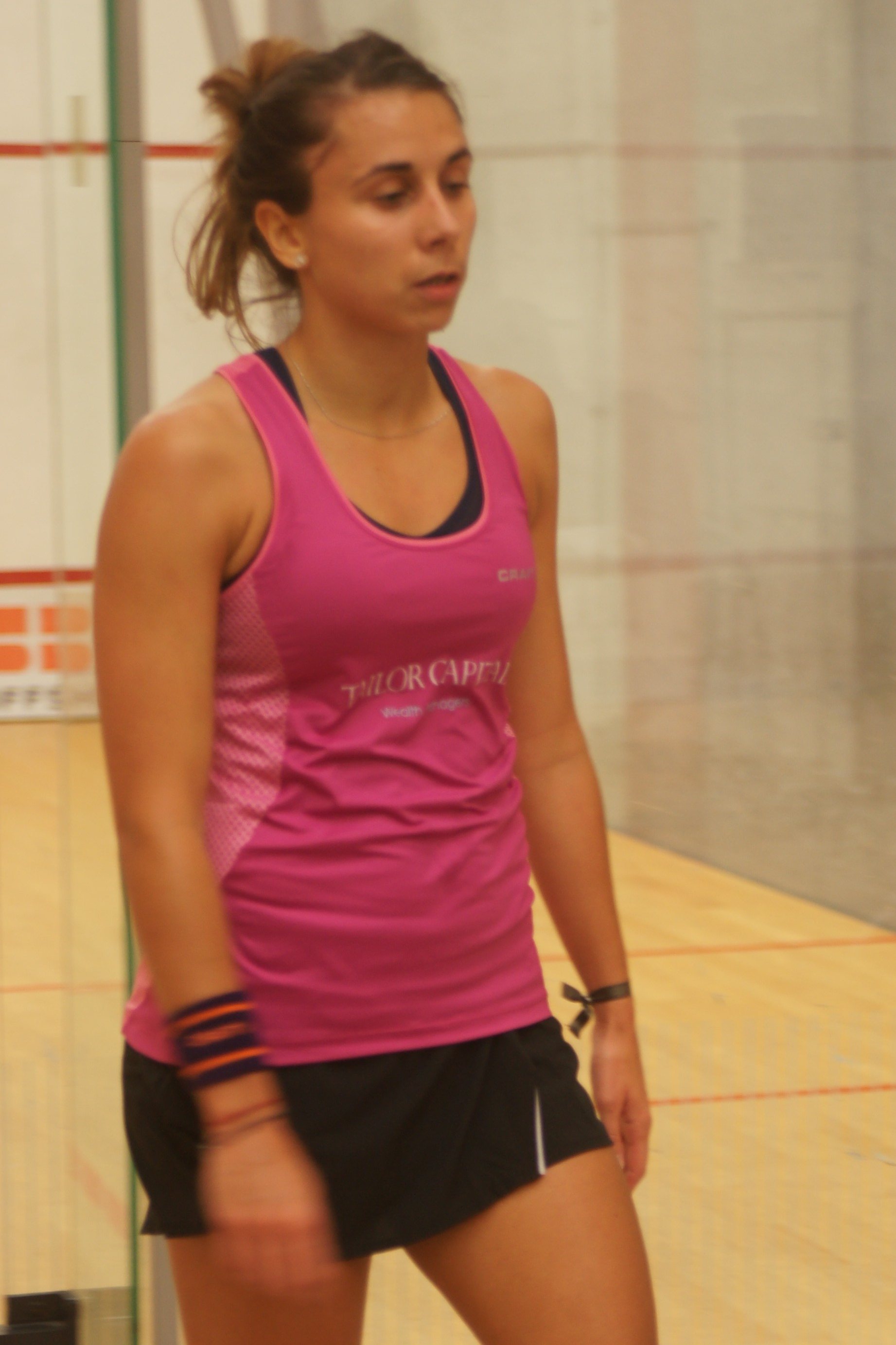
- Laura Pomportes, Monte-Carlo Squash Classic 2016

Personal information
- Born: 16 April 1986 (age 40) Toulouse, France

Sport
- Country: France
- Handedness: Right Handed
- Turned pro: 2008
- Retired: Active
- Racquet used: Prince

Women's singles
- Highest ranking: No. 51 (July 2015)
- Current ranking: No. 51 (July 2015)
- Tour final: 2
Medal record
Women's squash
Representing France
World Team Championships
Bronze medal – third place	2016 Issy-les-Moulineaux	Team
- Updated on July 2015

Laura Pomportes (born 16 April 1989 in Toulouse) is a retired professional squash player who has represented France. She reached a career-high world ranking of World No. 51 in July 2015.

== Career ==
In 2016, she was part of the French team that won the bronze medal at the 2016 Women's World Team Squash Championships in her home country.

She retired as a player in 2017, two years ago she was diagnosed with a major hip problem when the doctor had advised her to end her career.
