= Lucie Fialová =

Czech squash player (born 1988)

Personal information
- Born: July 22, 1988 (age 38) Prague, Czechoslovakia

Sport
- Country: Czech Republic
- Handedness: Left Handed
- Retired: Active
- Racquet used: Tecnifibre

Women's singles
- Highest ranking: No. 35 (February, 2012)
- Current ranking: No. 41 (June, 2013)
- Title: 2
- Tour final: 4
- Updated on November, 2012

Lucie Fialová (born 22 July 1988 in Prague) is a professional squash player who represents the Czech Republic. She reached a career-high ranking of World No. 35 in October 2011.
