= Lucas Serme =

French squash player (born 1992)

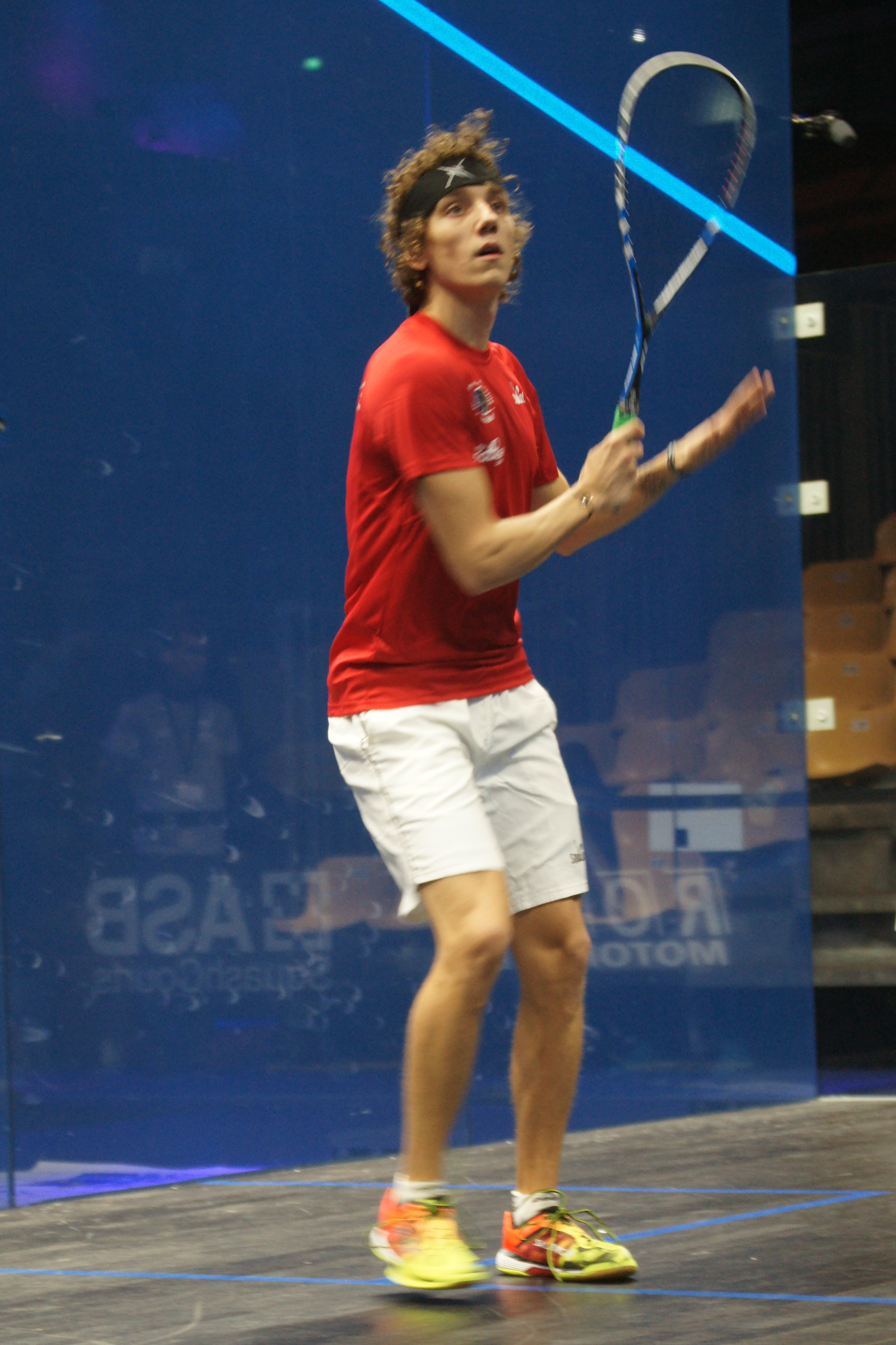
- Serme at the 2017 Men's World Team Squash Championships

Personal information
- Born: 25 February 1992 (age 34) Creteil, France
- Height: 1.79 m (5 ft 10 in)
- Weight: 70 kg (154 lb)

Sport
- Country: France
- Turned pro: 2009
- Coached by: Hadrian Stiff, Harry Londy
- Retired: Active
- Racquet used: Black Knight
- Highest ranking: No. 32 (October, 2018)
- Current ranking: No. 36 (March, 2021)
- Title: 7
- Tour final: 15
- Updated on July, 2018

Lucas Serme (born 25 February 1992 in Créteil) is a professional squash player who represented France. He reached a career-high world ranking of World No. 32 in October 2018. He married Czech squash player Anna Klimundová, now known as Anna Serme.

In the 2022 U.S. Open Mostafa Asal hit Lucas Serme with a shot up the middle of the court striking Serme in the head resulting in a concussion and perforated eardrum.
