= US Squash Doubles Champions =

== Men ==
=== Men's Open ===
Year	Winners
1933	Roy R. Coffin & Neil J. Sullivan II
1934	Roy R. Coffin & Neil J. Sullivan II
1935	Roy R. Coffin & Neil J. Sullivan II
1936	Roy R. Coffin & Neil J. Sullivan II
1937	Roy R. Coffin & Neil J. Sullivan II
1938	William E. Slack & H. Hunter Lott Jr.
1939	William E. Slack & H. Hunter Lott Jr.
1940	William E. Slack & H. Hunter Lott Jr.
1941	William E. Slack & H. Hunter Lott Jr.
1942	William E. Slack & H. Hunter Lott Jr.
1943	Not played
1944	Not played
1945	Not played
1946	Charles M. P. Brinton & Donald Strachan
1947	Stanley W. Pearson Jr. & David McMullin
1948	Charles M. P. Brinton & Stanley W. Pearson Jr.
1949	G. Diehl Mateer Jr. & H. Hunter Lott Jr.
1950	G. Diehl Mateer Jr. & H. Hunter Lott Jr.
1951	G. Diehl Mateer Jr. & Calvin D. MacCracken
1952	Germain Glidden & Richard Remsen
1953	G. Diehl Mateer Jr. & H. Hunter Lott Jr.
1954	G. Diehl Mateer Jr. & Richard C.Squires
1955	Joseph T. Hahn & Edward J. Hahn
1956	Carlton M. Badger & James M. Ethridge
1957	Carlton M. Badger & James M. Ethridge
1958	G. Diehl Mateer Jr. & John F. Hentz
1959	G. Diehl Mateer Jr. & John F. Hentz
1960	Howard Davis & James H. Whitmoyer
1961	G. Diehl Mateer Jr. John F. Hentz
1962	G. Diehl Mateer Jr. John F. Hentz
1963	Samuel P. Howe, III & R. William Danforth
1964	Samuel P. Howe, III & R. William Danforth
1965	G. Diehl Mateer Jr. & Ralph E. Howe
1966	G. Diehl Mateer Jr. & Ralph E. Howe
1967	Samuel P. Howe, III & R. William Danforth
1968	Victor Niederhoffer & Victor Elmaleh
1969	Samuel P. Howe, III & Ralph E. Howe
1970	Samuel P. Howe, III & Ralph E. Howe
1971	Samuel P. Howe, III & Ralph E. Howe
1972	Lawrence P. Terrell & James W. Zug
1973	Victor Niederhoffer & James W. Zug
1974	Victor Niederhoffer & Colin J. Adair
1975	Michael J. Pierce & Maurice Heckscher, II
1976	Peter S. Briggs & Ralph E. Howe
1977	C. Victor Harding & Peter J. Hall
1978	Thomas E. Page & Gilbert B. Mateer
1979	Thomas E. Page & Gilbert B. Mateer
1980	John B. Bottger & Gilbert B. Mateer
1981	C. Victor Harding & Peter J. Hall
1982	Lawerence S. Heath, III & John R. Reese
1983	C. Victor Harding & John D.H. (Jay) Gillespie
1984	Rob Hill & Andrew MacDonnald
1985	Peter S. Martin & John D.H. (Jay) Gillespie
1986	Gilbert B. Mateer & J. Andrew Mateer
1987	Scott W. Ryan & Richard A. Sheppard
1988	Scott W. Ryan & Richard A. Sheppard
1989	David G. Proctor & Maurice Heckscher, II
1990	David G. Proctor & George B. Lemmon, Jr.
1991	William F. Ramsay & Richard A. Sheppard
1992	Joseph J. Fabiani & Thomas W. Harrity
1993	Jonathan R. Foster & Morris W. Clothier
1994	Jonathan R. Foster & Morris W. Clothier
1995	Jonathan R. Foster & Morris W. Clothier
1996	David G. Proctor & James A. Heldring
1997	Peter De Rose & Peter Maule
1998	Eric J. Vlcek & Morris W. Clothier
1999	Eric J. Vlcek & Morris W. Clothier
2000	Eric J. Vlcek & Morris W. Clothier
2001	Eric J. Vlcek & Morris W. Clothier
2002	Gary K. Waite & Morris W. Clothier
2003	Eric J. Vlcek & Preston Quick
2004	Eric J. Vlcek & Preston Quick
2005	Gary K. Waite & Morris W. Clothier
2006	Gary K. Waite & Damien Mudge
2007	John Russell & Preston Quick
2008	Trevor S. McGuinness & Whitten M. Morris
2009	Trevor S. McGuinness & Whitten M. Morris
2010	Steven A. Scharff & Dylan J. Patterson
2011	Trevor S. McGuinness & Addison West
2012	Preston Quick & Gregory O. Park
2013	Preston Quick & Gregory O. Park
2014	Manek Mathur & Steven A. Scharff
2015	Jacques Swanepoel & Greg McArthur
2016	Thomas Brinkman & Freddie Reid
2017	Preston Quick & Graham Bassett
2018	Alex M. Stait & Edmund Garno
2019	Michael Ferreira & Whitten M. Morris
2020	James Stout & Dylan J. Patterson
2021	Not played
2022	Adam Bews & James Bamber
2023	Michael Ferreira & William B. Hartigan
2024	Kyle Martino & Elroy Leung
2025	Clinton Leeuw & Jaymie Haycocks
2026	Adham Madi & Jaymie Haycocks

=== Men's 40+ ===
Year	Winners
1971	Donald E. Leggat & Charles C. Wright
1972	G. Diehl Mateer Jr. & William J. Tully
1973	James Bentley & William J. Bewley
1974	Donald E. Leggat & Charles C. Wright
1975	Donald E. Leggat & Charles C. Wright
1976	Donald E. Leggat & Charles C. Wright
1977	Thomas B. Jones & John A. Swann
1978	Edward C. Simmons, III & Melvin K. Sokolow
1979	Edward C. Simmons, III & Melvin K. Sokolow
1980	Helmut Meertz & Christian Spahr
1981	Edward C. Simmons, III & Melvin K. Sokolow
1982	Edward C. Simmons, III & Melvin K. Sokolow
1983	Andrew B. Pastor & Peter J. Hall
1984	Andrew B. Pastor & Peter J. Hall
1985	Andrew B. Pastor & Peter J. Hall
1986	Andrew B. Pastor & Peter J. Hall
1987	George Maguire & Alexander B. Martin
1988	George Maguire & Alexander B. Martin
1989	Thomas M. Poor & Alexander B. Martin
1990	Scott W. Ryan & Maurice Heckscher, II
1991	Charlie P. Jacobs & Leonard A. Bernheimer
1992	Scott W. Ryan & Gordon D.H. Anderson
1993	Scott W. Ryan & Gordon D.H. Anderson
1994	Paul D. Assaiante & Gordon D.H. Anderson
1995	Michael J. Pierce & J. Andrew Mateer
1996	Michael J. Pierce & J. Andrew Mateer
1997	Michael J. Pierce & J. Andrew Mateer
1998	John R. Lau & Gordon D.H. Anderson
1999	C. Victor Harding & Sean P. McDonough
2000	Peter D. DeRose & Alan B. Hunt
2001	Gregg D. Finn & Richard A. Sheppard
2002	Gregg D. Finn & Richard A. Sheppard
2003	Michael R. Costigan & Alan B. Hunt
2004	Michael R. Costigan & Alan B. Hunt
2005	Edmund R. Chilton & Andrew W. E. Slater
2006	John M. Conway & William J. Villari
2007	Douglas J. Lifford & Christian F. Spahr
2008	John C. C. McAtee & Thomas A. Clayton
2009	John C. C. McAtee & Thomas A. Clayton
2010	Eric J. Vlcek & Thomas W. Harrity
2011	Michael Puertas & Jeff K. Mulligan
2012	Scott Dulmage & Rich Thomson
2013	Shane Coleman & Michael Puertas
2014	Dave Rosen & Clive Leach
2015	Shane Coleman & John White
2016	Chris Deratnay & Steven A. Scharff
2017	Nathan K. Dugan & Michael Puertas
2018	Shane Coleman & Mark Price
2019	Shane Coleman & Mark Price
2020	Nathan K. Dugan & Mark Heather
2021	Not played
2022	Preston Quick & John Russell
2023	Preston Quick & John Russell
2024	Jeff Osborne & Mark Price
2025	Preston Quick & Wade Johnstone
2026	Preston Quick & Michael Ferreira

=== Men's 45+ ===
Year	Winners
2002	Peter S. Briggs & Peer T. Pedersen, Jr
2003	Andrew R. Nehrbas & Douglas C. Rice
2004	Albert G. Tierney, III & Derrick C. Niederman
2005	Todd Binns & Thomas M. Boldt
2006	Todd Binns & John P. Boldt
2007	Dominic Hughes & Richard A. Sheppard
2008	Michael R. Costigan & Alan B. Hunt
2009	Michael Martin & Russell Welty
2010	Edmund R. Chilton & Andrew W. E. Slater
2011	James D. Bentley & Bartholomew J. Sambrook
2012	Doug J. Lifford & Chris Spahr
2013	William Villari & Chris Walker
2014	Jeff Mulligan & Chris Walker
2015	Jeff Mulligan & Scott D. Stoneburgh
2016	Scott Dulmage & Rich Thomson
2017	Scott Dulmage & Rich Thomson
2018	Scott Dulmage & Rich Thomson
2019	Ryan O'Connell & Harrison Mullin
2020	Clive Leach & Thomas W. Harrity
2021	Not played
2022	Steven A. Scharff & Nathan K. Dugan
2023	Shane Coleman & Mark Price
2024	Not played
2025	Not played
2026	Matt Jenson & Mark Price

=== Men's 50+ ===
Year	Winners
1962	Roger M. Bakey & Harold W. Kaese
1963	William E. Lamble & George L. Doetsch
1964	Paul G. Ouimet & J. Milton Street
1965	William T Ketcham Jr. & James M. Ethridge, III
1966	William T Ketcham Jr. & James M. Ethridge, III
1967	Howard A. Davis & Edward J. Hahn
1968	William T Ketcham Jr. & James M. Ethridge, III
1969	William T Ketcham Jr. & James M. Ethridge, III
1970	F.Hastings Griffin, III & Newton B. Meade
1971	William T Ketcham Jr. & Howard A. Davis
1972	Jack Bowling & Jinx Johnson
1973	William T Ketcham Jr. & Victor Elmaleh
1974	William T Ketcham. Jr. & Newton B. Meade, Jr.
1975	Eugene O'Conner & Thomas Schweizer
1976	Gordon H. Guyatt & Eric G. Wiffen
1977	Gordon H. Guyatt & Eric G. Wiffen
1978	Nelson M. Graves, Jr. & William R. Dann
1979	Darwin P. Kingsley, III & Alfred R. Hunter
1980	Darwin P. Kingsley, III & Alfred R. Hunter
1981	Donald E. Leggat & Charles C. Wright
1982	James Bentley & William J. Bewley
1983	Donald E. Leggat & John R. Fuller
1984	Donald E. Leggat & John R. Fuller
1985	Donald E. Leggat & John R. Fuller
1986	Donald E. Leggat & John R. Fuller
1987	Kevin E. Parker & J. Ritchie Bell
1988	Garry G. Gale & John R. Fuller
1989	Edward C. Simmons, III & Melvin K. Sokolow
1990	Edward C. Simmons, III & Melvin K. Sokolow
1991	A.C. Hubbard & James W. Zug
1992	Ralph E. Howe & David O'Loughlin
1993	Raichard Roe & Maurice Heckscher, II
1994	Thomas M. Poor & Leonard A. Bernheimer
1995	Ralph E. Howe & Maurice Heckscher, II
1996	Thomas M. Poor & Leonard A. Bernheimer
1997	Thomas M. Poor & Leonard A. Bernheimer
1998	Thomas M. Poor & Leonard A. Bernheimer
1999	Gulmast Khan & Gul Khan
2000	Gulmast Khan & Gul Khan
2001	Michael J. Pierce & Gordon D.H. Anderson
2002	Michael J. Pierce & Gordon D.H. Anderson
2003	Michael J. Pierce & Gordon D.H. Anderson
2004	Michael J. Pierce & Gordon D.H. Anderson
2005	Albert G. Tierney, III & Derrick C. Niederman
2006	Robert Massey & Robert Hensel
2007	Thomas M. Boldt & John D.H. (Jay) Gillespie
2008	Andrew R. Nehrbas & Douglas C. Rice
2009	Thomas M. Boldt & John P. Boldt
2010	Eben Hardie, III & James T. Heldring
2011	Eben Hardie, III & James T. Heldring
2012	Dominic Hughes, III & Richard A. Sheppard
2013	Dominic Hughes, III & Richard A. Sheppard
2014	Rob Hill & William Ullman
2015	Edmund R. Chilton & Andrew Slater
2016	Edmund R. Chilton & Andrew Slater
2017	Edmund R. Chilton & Andrew Slater
2018	Jeff J. Stanley & William Ullman
2019	Edmund R. Chilton & Andrew Slater
2020	Chris Walker & Michael Puertas
2021	Not played
2022	Chris Walker & Michael Puertas
2023	Chris Walker & Michael Puertas
2024	Chris Walker & Thomas W. Harrity
2025	Harrison Mullin & Nathan K. Dugan
2026	David Rosen & Steven Scharff

=== Men's 55+ ===
Year	Winners
1987	Jervis Finney & Alva Weaver, III
1988	James Bentley & William J. Bewley
1989	Ed Brandreth & Fred Reaume
1990	Charles Stehle & Alva Weaver, III
1991	Eugene D. Perle & John R. Fuller
1992	Eugene D. Perle & John R. Fuller
1993	Eugene D. Perle & John R. Fuller
1994	Eugene D. Perle & John R. Fuller
1995	Eugene D. Perle & Alfred F. Bracher, III
1996	Samuel P. Howe, III & James W. Zug
1997	Peter B. Hatcher & David K. Bogert
1998	Anthony Swift & Maurice Heckscher, II
1999	Ralph E. Howe & Leonard A. Bernheimer
2000	Thomas M. Poor & Leonard A. Bernheimer
2001	Thomas M. Poor & Leonard A. Bernheimer
2002	Thomas M. Poor & Leonard A. Bernheimer
2003	Thomas M. Poor & Leonard A. Bernheimer
2004	Michael J. Downer & Thomas F. Nederpel
2005	Michael J. Pierce & Gordon D.H. Anderson
2006	Michael J. Pierce & Gordon D.H. Anderson
2007	C. Victor Harding & Sean P. McDonough
2008	Michael J. Pierce & Gordon D.H. Anderson
2009	Albert G. Tierney, III & Sean P. McDonough
2010	Albert G. Tierney, III & Sean P. McDonough
2011	Albert G. Tierney, III & Sean P. McDonough
2012	Albert G. Tierney, III & Sean P. McDonough
2013	Albert G. Tierney, III & Sean P. McDonough
2014	John P. Boldt & Thomas M. Boldt
2015	Andrew Nehrbas & Douglas C. Rice
2016	Patrick Miller & Peter Bostwick
2017	Charles H. Parkhurst & Joseph Purrazzella
2018	Dominic Hughes, III & Richard A. Sheppard
2019	Dominic Hughes, III & Richard A. Sheppard
2020	Todd Binns & Rick Wahlstedt
2021	Not played
2022	Jeff J. Stanley & William Ullman
2023	Jeff J. Stanley & William Ullman
2024	Edmund R. Chilton & Andrew Slater
2025	Christopher Haley & Jeff Deverill
2026	Thomas W. Harrity & Chris Walker

=== Men's 60+ ===
Year	Winners
1983	F. Hastings Griffin, III & Tom Leonards
1984	Newton B. Meade Jr. & Thomas Schweizer
1985	Robert Stuckert & Delbert O. Fuller Jr.
1986	F. Hastings Griffin, III & Tom Leonards
1987	Nelson M. Graves Jr. & William R. Dann
1988	Darwin P. Kingsley, III & Alfred E. Hunter Jr.
1989	Donald D. Boyko & Charles Butt
1990	Donald D. Boyko & Jim Jones
1991	Donald D. Boyko & Jim Jones
1992	Donald D. Boyko & Jim Jones
1993	Dick Moses & Wheelock Whitney
1994	Allan Deutermann & Charles Stehle
1995	John Fuller & Dick Will
1996	John Fuller & Dick Will
1997	Eugene D. Perle & Alfred F. Bracher, III
1998	Eugene D. Perle & Alfred F. Bracher, III
1999	Eugene D. Perle & Alfred F. Bracher, III
2000	J. Ritchie Bell & Michael C. Wilson
2001	Eugene D. Perle & Alfred F. Bracher, III
2002	Peter B. Hatcher & David K. Bogert
2003	Peter B. Hatcher & David K. Bogert
2004	Bartlett H. McGuire & John A. Osburn
2005	Thomas M. Poor & Leonard A. Bernheimer
2006	Thomas M. Poor & Leonard A. Bernheimer
2007	Joseph B. Fitzpatrick & Alexander B. Martin
2008	Joseph B. Fitzpatrick & Alexander B. Martin
2009	Clark Amos & Gul Khan
2010	Michael J. Pierce & Gordon D.H. Anderson
2011	John S. Boynton & Timothy K. Griffin
2012	Brian Murray & Steve Mclntyre
2013	Casey McKee & Palmer Page
2014	Andrew R. Nehrbas & Stanley H. Dorney
2015	Albert G. Tierney, III & Sean McDonough
2016	Andrew R. Nehrbas & Christopher W. Gould
2017	Andrew R. Nehrbas & Christopher W. Gould
2018	Douglas C. Rice & Tim Griffin
2019	Patrick Miller & Peter Bostwick
2020	Peter D. DeRose & Alan Hunt
2021	Not played
2022	Dominic Hughes, III & Richard A. Sheppard
2023	Dominic Hughes, III & Richard A. Sheppard
2024	Dominic Hughes, III & Bart Sambrook
2025	Dominic Hughes, III & Bart Sambrook
2026	Dominic Hughes, III & Bart Sambrook

=== Men's 65+ ===
Year	Winners
1996	Donald D. Boyko & Jim Jones
1997	David B.Brown & Samuel Nisenboim
1998	David B.Brown & Samuel Nisenboim
1999	Charles Stehle & Alan Deuterman
2000	Charles Stehle & Alan Deuterman
2001	Charles Stehle & Alan Deuterman
2002	Eugene D Perle & Alfred F. Bracher, III
2003	Eugene D Perle & Alfred F. Bracher, III
2004	Not played
2005	Michael C. Wilson & J. Ritchie Bell
2006	Michael C. Wilson & David K. Bogert
2007	Bartlett H. McGuire & John A. Osburn
2008	James W. Zug & Maurice Heckscher, II
2009	Thomas M. Poor & Leonard A. Bernheimer
2010	Anthony Swift & S. Molson Robertson
2011	David M. Potter & Christopher J. Wheeler
2012	Tony Swift & Molson Robertson
2013	Tony Swift & Molson Robertson
2014	David M. Potter & Christopher J. Wheeler
2015	John Brazilian & Gordon D.H. Anderson
2016	Michael Pierce & Gordon D.H. Anderson
2017	Palmer Page & Joseph C. McKee
2018	Palmer Page & Joseph C. McKee
2019	Albert G. Tierney, III & Sean McDonough
2020	Albert G. Tierney, III & Sean McDonough
2021	Not played
2022	Bruce Brickman & Steve Mandel
2023	Peter Bostwick & Robert H. Bolling
2024	Peter Bostwick & Robert H. Bolling
2025	Peter Bostwick & Robert H. Bolling
2026	Peter D. DeRose & Peter H. Monaghan

=== Men's 70+ ===
Year	Winners
1993	F. Hastings Griffin, III & Ted Heisler
1994	Not played
1995	Kenner C. Ames & Gordon H. Guyatt
1996	Ed Helfeld & Delbert O. Fuller
1997	Nelson M. Graves, Jr. & William R. Dann
1998	Gordon H. Guyatt & R.G.R.(Barney)Lawrence
1999	Nelson M. Graves, Jr. & William R. Dann
2000	Donald D. Boyko & Samuel Nisenboim
2001	Donald D. Boyko & Joel A. Kozol
2002	Not played
2003	David B. Brown & Samuel Nisenboim
2004	Not played
2005	Charles E. Leonard & James M. Hill
2006	Peter R. Holland & Norman M. Seagram
2007	Barry A. Abelson & Peter R. Holland
2008	Barry A. Abelson & Alfred F. Bracher, III
2009	Donald D. Mills & J. Ritchie Bell
2010	Michael C. Wilson & J. Ritchie Bell
2011	Donald D. Mills & Theodore R. Marmor
2012	Bartlett H. McGuire & John Osburn
2013	Bartlett H. McGuire & Donald D. Mills
2014	Thomas M. Poor & Leonard A. Bernheimer
2015	Tony Swift & Molson Robertson
2016	David M. Potter & Christopher J. Wheeler
2017	Thomas M. Poor & Molson Robertson
2018	David M. Potter & Christopher J. Wheeler
2019	R. Clark Amos & John H. Brazilian
2020	Brian Murray & Stephen McIntyre
2021	Not played
2022	Palmer Page & Casey McKee
2023	Tim Griffin & John H. Brazilian
2024	Albert G. Tierney, III & Sean McDonough
2025	Albert G. Tierney, III & Sean McDonough
2026	Albert G. Tierney, III & Sean McDonough

=== Men's 75+ ===
Year	Winners
2003	John Callander & Edward Helfeld
2004	Paul Fisher & Michael McBean
2005	Not played
2006	Paul Fisher & Michael McBean
2007	Not played
2008	Not played
2009	Not played
2010	Peter R. Holland & Norman R. Seagram
2011	Peter R. Holland & Norman R. Seagram
2012	Peter R. Holland & Norman R. Seagram
2013	Barry Abelson & John Wildman
2014	Don Mills & Ritchie Bell
2015	Don Mills & Ritchie Bell
2016	Not played
2017	Bartlett H. McGuire & Leonard A. Bernheimer
2018	Bartlett H. McGuire & Leonard A. Bernheimer
2019	Thomas M. Poor & Richard E. Rice
2020	Tony Swift & Molson Robertson
2021	Not played
2022	James W. Zug & Richard E. Rice
2023	James W. Zug & Richard E. Rice
2024	R. Clark Amos & Dennis R. Cusack
2025	R. Clark Amos & Dennis R. Cusack
2026	Roderick Smith & Palmer Page

=== Men's 80+ ===
Year	Winners
2009	Charles Butt & Scott Fraser
2010	Charles Butt & Scott Fraser
2011	Not played
2012	Charles Butt & Scott Fraser
2013	Not played
2014	Not played
2015	Peter R. Holland & Trevor Bishop
2016	Not played
2017	Barry A. Abelson & Lee Norman
2018	Peter R. Holland & Trevor Bishop
2019	Not played
2020	Not played
2021	Not played
2022	Not played
2023	Bartlett H. McGuire & Leonard Bernheimer
2024	Bartlett H. McGuire & James W. Zug
2025	Christopher Tatum & James W. Zug
2026	Christopher Tatum & David M. Potter

== Women ==
=== Women's Open ===
Year	Winners
1933	Anne Page & Sarah Madeira
1934	Margaret Bostwick & Agnes Lamme
1935	Sheila McKechnie & Anne Lytton-Milbank
1936	Anne Page & Agnes Lamme
1937	Betty Cooke & Toby Barret
1938	Alice Bierwith & Mary Adams
1939	Alice Bierwith & Mary Adams
1940	Alice Bierwith & Mary Adams
1941	Elizabeth Pearson & Hope Knowles Rawls
1942	Not played
1943	Not played
1944	Not played
1945	Not played
1946	Not played
1947	Not played
1948	Peggy Scott Carrott & Margaret Vaill
1949	Janet R.M. Morgan & Alice Teague
1950	Jane Austin Stauffer & Hope Knowles Rawls
1951	Peggy Scott Carrott & Frances McGurn Bottger
1952	Anne Mattson & Ann Wetzel
1953	Louisa Manly-Power & Barbara Newlin
1954	Louisa Manly-Power & Barbara Newlin
1955	Janet R.M. Morgan & Shelia Speight MacIntosh
1956	Barbara Clement & Ann Wetzel
1957	Louisa Manly-Power & Sylvia Simonin
1958	Louisa Manly-Power & Sylvia Simonin
1959	Ann Wetzel & Sylvia Simonin
1960	Barbara Clement & Jean Classen
1961	Jane Austin Stauffer & Frances McGurn Bottger
1962	Jeanne Classen & Bunny Vosters
1963	Sheila Speight MacIntosh & Fran Marshall
1964	Jane Austin Stauffer & Ann Wetzel
1965	Jeanne Classen & Bunny Vosters
1966	Jeanne Classen & Bunny Vosters
1967	Jeanne Classen & Bunny Vosters
1968	Betty Meade & Bunny Vosters
1969	Carol Thesieres & Joyce Davenport
1970	Carol Thesieres & Jane Austin Stauffer
1971	Jeanne Classen & Bunny Vosters
1972	Gretchen Spruance & Bunny Vosters
1973	Gretchen Spruance & Bunny Vosters
1974	Gretchen Spruance & Bunny Vosters
1975	Carol Thesieres & Jane Austin Stauffer
1976	Gretchen Spruance & Bunny Vosters
1977	Gretchen Spruance & Bunny Vosters
1978	Jane Austin Stauffer & Barbara Maltby
1979	Carol Thesieres & Joyce Davenport
1980	Carol Thesieres & Joyce Davenport
1981	Carol Thesieres & Joyce Davenport
1982	Carol Thesieres & Joyce Davenport
1983	Mary O'Toole & Gail Ramsay
1984	Heather McKay & Barbara Savage
1985	Heather McKay & Barbara Savage
1986	Sue Cogswell & Mariann Greenberg
1987	Barbara Maltby & Joyce Davenport
1988	Barbara Maltby & Joanne Law
1989	Barbara Maltby & Joyce Davenport
1990	Barbara Maltby & Joyce Davenport
1991	Julie Harris & Gail Ramsay
1992	Julie Harris & Gail Ramsay
1993	Dawn Friedly & Joanne Law
1994	Demer Holleran & Berkeley Belknap
1995	Julie Harris & Joyce Davenport
1996	Demer Holleran & Alicia McConnell
1997	Demer Holleran & Alicia McConnell
1998	Demer Holleran & Alicia McConnell
1999	Demer Holleran & Alicia McConnell
2000	Demer Holleran & Alicia McConnell
2001	Demer Holleran & Alicia McConnell
2002	Demer Holleran & Alicia McConnell
2003	Demer Holleran & Alicia McConnell
2004	Demer Holleran & Alicia McConnell
2005	Pochi Holdefer & Alicia McConnell
2006	Pochi Holdefer & Alicia McConnell
2007	Meredeth Quick & Fiona Geaves
2008	Natalie Grainger & Jessica DiMauro
2009	Natalie Grainger & Jessica DiMauro
2010	Narelle Krizek & Suzy Pierrepont
2011	Narelle Krizek & Natarsha McElhinny
2012	Meredeth Quick & Stephanie Hewitt
2013	Dana A. Betts & Stephanie Hewitt
2014	Narelle Krizek & Stephanie Hewitt
2015	Dana A. Betts & Natalie Grainger
2016	Dana A. Betts & Stephanie Hewitt
2017	Meredeth R. Quick & Suzie Pierrepont
2018	Stephanie Hewitt & Georgina Stoker
2019	Meredeth R. Quick & Georgina Stoker
2020	Elani Landman & Lume Landman
2021	Not played
2022	Elani Landman & Lume Landman
2023	Lauren West & Georgina Stoker
2024	Maria Elena Ubina & Kayley Leonard
2025	Lauren West & Georgina Stoker
2026	Lauren West & Georgina Stoker

=== Women's 40+ ===
Year	Winners
1956	Peggy Carrott & Blanche Day
1957	Anne Townsend & Amelie Rorer
1958	Charlotte Prizer & Edith Beatty
1959	Peggy Carrott & Blanche Day
1960	Barbara Clement & Frances Bottger
1961	Barbara Clement & Frances Bottger
1962	Frances Bottger & Margaret (Varner) duPont
1963	Not played
1964	Barbara Clement & Frances Bottger
1965	Barbara Clement & Bunny Vosters
1966	Not played
1967	Not played
1968	Not played
1969	Louisa Manly-Power & Barbara Newlin
1970	Peggy Carrott & Nancy Hunsberger
1971	Not played
1972	Peggy Carrott & Betty Constable
1973	Peggy Carrott & Betty Constable
1974	Peggy Carrott & Betty Constable
1975	Barbara Hunter & Jeanne Classen
1976	Merigold Edwards & Irma Brogan
1977	Jeanne Classen & Jane Classen
1978	Jeanne Classen & Jane Classen
1979	Jeanne Classen & Jane Classen
1980	Carol Thesieres & Irma Brogan
1981	Carol Thesieres & Irma Brogan
1982	Carol Thesieres & Irma Brogan
1983	Joyce Davenport & Jane Young
1984	Joyce Davenport & Jane Young
1985	Mary O'Toole & Irma Brogan
1986	Joyce Davenport & Sharon Schwarze
1987	Joyce Davenport & Sharon Schwarze
1988	Joyce Davenport & Sharon Schwarze
1989	Joyce Davenport & Sharon Schwarze
1990	Joyce Davenport & Sharon Schwarze
1991	Joyce Davenport & Sharon Schwarze
1992	Joyce Davenport & Sharon Schwarze
1993	Joyce Davenport & Sharon Schwarze
1994	Joyce Davenport & Sharon Schwarze
1995	Joyce Davenport & Sharon Schwarze
1996	Joyce Davenport & Sharon Schwarze
1997	Jody Law & Molly Pierce
1998	Jody Law & Molly Pierce
1999	Jody Law & Molly Pierce
2000	Margaret Rux & Sharon Schwarze
2001	Jody Law & Molly Pierce
2002	Jody Law & Molly Pierce
2003	Sara Luther & Joyce Davenport
2004	Sara Luther & Joyce Davenport
2005	Julieanne Harris & Joyce Davenport
2006	Sara Luther & Joyce Davenport
2007	Julieanne Harris & Joyce Davenport
2008	Sara Luther & Joyce Davenport
2009	Sara Luther & Alicia McConnell
2010	Patrice Cromwell & Alicia McConnell
2011	Kathryn Grant & Lissen Tutrone
2012	Karen Jerome & Lee T. Belknap
2013	Lee T. Belknap & Berkeley Revenaugh
2024	Shirin Kaufman & Berkeley Belknap
2025	Not played
2026	Not played

=== Women's 50+ ===
Year	Winners
2008	Sandra Shaw & Lolly Gillen
2009	Susan Bell & Judy Martin
2010	Sara Luther & Joyce Davenport
2011	Sara Luther & Joyce Davenport
2012	Molly Pierce & Tracey Greer
2013	Joyce Davenport & Sarah Luther
2024	Kathryn Grant & Lissen Tutrone
2025	Mary McKee & Berkeley Belknap
2026	Not played

=== Women's 60+ ===
Year	Winners
2023	V. Vaughan Schmidt & Tracy Greer
2024	Sara Luther & Beth Fedorowich
2025	Sara Luther & Alicia McConnell
2026	Sara Luther & Kara Kardon

== Mixed ==
=== Mixed Open ===
Year	Winners
1969	Jane Stauffer & Daniel Pierson
1970	Gretchen Vosters & Christian Spahr
1971	Gretchen Vosters & Christian Spahr
1972	Jane Stauffer & Tom Poor
1973	Jane Stauffer & Tom Poor
1974	Jane Stauffer & Tom Poor
1975	Nina Moyer & Palmer Page
1976	Jane Stauffer & Tom Poor
1977	Jane Stauffer & Tom Poor
1978	Joyce Davenport & Ralph Howe
1979	Carol Thesieres & Gil Mateer
1980	Joyce Davenport & Ralph Howe
1981	Joyce Davenport & Ralph Howe
1982	Gail Ramsay & Bill Ramsay
1983	Gail Ramsay & Bill Ramsay
1984	Joyce Davenport & Peter Briggs
1985	Gail Ramsay & Neal Vohr
1986	Gail Ramsay & Bill Ramsay
1987	Gail Ramsay & Bill Ramsay
1988	Barbara Maltby & Mike Pierce
1989	Joyce Davenport & Victor Harding
1990	Gail Ramsay & Bill Ramsay
1991	Gail Ramsay & Bill Ramsay
1992	Joyce Davenport & Dave Proctor
1993	Joyce Davenport & Morris Clothier
1994	Demer Holleran & Keen Butcher
1995	Demer Holleran & Keen Butcher
1996	Demer Holleran & Keen Butcher
1997	Demer Holleran & Keen Butcher
1998	Demer Holleran & Keen Butcher
1999	Demer Holleran & Keen Butcher
2000	Demer Holleran & Keen Butcher
2001	Jessie Chai & Gary Waite
2002	Demer Holleran & Keen Butcher
2003	Jessie Chai & Victor Berg
2004	Stephanie Hewitt & James Hewitt
2005	Tony Catalan & Phoebe Trubowitz
2006	Meredeth Quick & Preston Quick
2007	Narelle Krizek & Paul Price
2008	Narelle Krizek & Dave Rosen
2009	Suzie Pierrepont & Trevor McGuinness
2010	Natalie Grainger & Steve Scharff
2011	Emily Lungstrum & Tim Wyant
2012	Narelle Krizek & Manek Mathur
2022	Georgina Stoker & John White
2023	Georgina Stoker & John White
2024	Line Hansen & Cameron Pilley
2025	Georgina Stoker & John White
2026	Kayley Leonard & T.J. Dembinski

=== Mixed 40+ ===
Year	Winners
1998	Nancy Cushman & Frank Cushman
1999	Nancy Cushman & Frank Cushman
2000	Molly Downer & Sandy Tierney
2001	Annette Andruss & John Nimick
2002	Rick Sheppard & Sandy Worthington
2003	Sara Luther & Fred Duboc
2004	Julie Harris & Tom Harrity
2005	Sara Luther & Fred Duboc
2006	Tom Harrity & Kat Van Blarcom
2007	Morris Clothier & Leslie Freeman
2008	Morris Clothier & Jeanne Blasberg
2009	Ed Chilton & Joyce Davenport
2010	Kathy Grant & Alan Grant
2011	Amy Milanek & Dave Rosen
2012	Demer Holleran and Ed Chilton

=== Mixed 50+ ===
Year	Winners
2006	Julie Harris & Tom Tarentino
2007	Not played
2008	Jay Gillespie & Joyce Davenport
2009	Jernnifer Edson & Peter Stokes
2010	Molly Pierce & James Heldring
2011	Joanne Law & Andrew Nehrbas
2012	Joyce Davenport & Alan Grant
2022	Amy Milanek & Sunil Desai
2023	Mary McKee & David Rosen
2024	Mary McKee & David Rosen
2025	Stephanie Hewitt & Charlie Humber
2026	Mary McKee & Charlie Humber

=== Mixed 60+ ===
Year	Winners
2023	Susan Greene & Joseph Purrazzella
2024	Kathryn Grant & Thomas W. Harrity
2025	Phoebe Trubowitz & Edmund Chilton
2026	Phoebe Trubowitz & Kenton Jernigan

=== Mixed Junior u13 ===
Year	Winners
2013	Caroline Spahr & Deven S. Kanwal

=== Mixed Junior u15 ===
Year	Winners
2013	Emily B. Beinkampen & Maximo L. Moyer
2023	Layla Gupta & Jacob Price
2024	Amelia Rutherford & Peter Pierce

=== Mixed Junior u17 ===
Year	Winners
2013	Kayley M. Leonard & Jarett M. Odrich
2023	Ava Lin Jr. & Aiden Shap
2024	Kaitlyn Vahlsing & Reed Morris

=== Mixed Junior u19 ===
Year	Winners
2010	Andrew McGuinness & Amanda Sobhy
2011	Andrew McGuinness & Bailey Bondy
2012	Andrew McGuinness & Olivia Weaver
2013	Sarah Hopton & Trevor Wentzell
2023	Caroline M. Fouts & Andrew T. Glaser
2024	Grace E. Fazzinga & Oscar Okonkwo
2025	Layla Gupta & Jack Elriani

== Junior Boys ==
	u19	u17	u15	u13	u11
1991	Ted Bruenner/Baird McIlvain		Charles Saunders/Gardner LaMotte		
1992	Jess Berline/Steve Scharff	Charlie Saunders/Gardner LaMotte	Douug MacBean/Addison West		
1993	Mike Pirnak/Taras Klymenko	Charlie Saunders/Gardner LaMotte	Addison West/Stewart Young		
1994	Dave McNeely/Tim Wyant			Kyle Sleasman/Shawn Dunn	
1995	Preston Quick/Addison West	Eric Pearson/John Hyett	George Edwards/Tony Morris	Andrew Scott/Will Broadbent	Tom Greenwood/Sean Seese
1996	Will Ruthrauff/Josh Barenbaum	Ben Owens/Marshall Wright	Tom Greenwood/Sean Seese	Tom Greenwood/Sean Seese	Michael Hoy/Todd Somerlatte
1997	Dave Delaney/Chris Barry	Will Broadbent/Asher Hochberg	Will Broadbent/Asher Hochberg	Will Broadbent/Asher Hochberg	Tripp Kyle/Eli Wolfe
1998	Will Broadbent/Coly Smith	Will Broadbent/Coly Smith	Nick Chris/Ben Ende		Daniel Carson/ Trevor McGuinness
1999	Will Osnato/Ben Schippers		Tim Porter/Tyler Kyle		Daniel Carson/ Trevor McGuinness
2000	Will Osnato/Ben Schippers		Tim Porter/Tyler Kyle	Daniel Carson/ Trevor McGuinness	Steven Harrington/Tucker Roberts
2001	Ted Hill/John Sawin		Chris Nehrbas/Alex Thompson	Trevor McGuinness/Sam Biddle	
2002	Will Broadbent/Breck Bailey		Todd Ruth/Trevor McGuinness		Jack Maine/Nick Schreiber
2003	Ted Hill/John Sawin		Todd Ruth/Trevor McGuinness	Danny Greenberg/Charles Quintin	
2004	Tim Porter/Alex Davis	Trevor McGuinness/Todd Ruth	Clay Blackiston/Robbie Berner	Danny Greenberg/Charles Quintin	Andersen Good/Nick Schreiber
2005	Parker Justi/Chris Nehbras	Trevor McGuinness/Todd Harrity	Todd Harrity/Stephen Harrington	Hunter Abrams/Joey Powden	
2006	Trevor McGuinness/Todd Ruth	Chris Callis/Alex Domenick	Charles Quintin/Danny Greenberg	Bart Mackey/Ross Bolling	Jason Shein/Phillip Kelly
2007	Trevor McGuinness/Andrew McGuinness	Jack Ervasti/Jason Michas	Browning Platt/Scott Chapin	Randy Beck/Augie Frank	
2008	Chris Callis/Alex Domenick	Hunter Beck/Dylan Ward	Edward Columbia/Michael East		
2009	Danny Greenberg/Charles Quintin	Taylor Tutrone/Dylan Murray	Peter McCall/Alex McCall	Boden Polikoff/Hanley Frantz	
2010	Andrew McGuinness & Devin McLaughlin	Randy Beck/Auggie Frank	Kevin Flannery/Jamie Ruggiero	Boden Polikoff/David Yacobucci	Bo Anderson/Peter Miller
2011	Andrew McGuinness and George Lemmon	Kevin Flannery/Jamie Ruggiero	Henry Parkhurst/Jarett Odrich	Ben Gard/Sean Oen	
2012	Andrew McGuinness and George Lemmon	Kevin Flannery/Jamie Ruggiero	Boden Polikoff/David Yacobucci	Griffin Glendinning/Lucas Stauffer	Dylan Deverill/Scott Holtshousen
2013	Randy Beck and Mason A. Blake	Jarett M. Ordich and Senen A. Ubina	Christopher Dalgish and Sean Oen	Deven S. Kanwal and David C. Rubin	Andrew H. Aube and William Aube
2014	Philip Kelly and Mason A. Blake	Not Played	Not Played	Not Played	
2015	Carson Spahr and Matthew Giegerich	Samuel B. Scherl and Sean Oen	Cole Koeppel & Deven S. Kanwal	David Beeson & Merritt W. Wurts	
2016	Timmy Brownell and Sean Oen	Not Played	Maxwell Velazquez & Tate Suratt	Will Lichstein & Tobey Surata	
2017	Maximo L. Moyer and Peter C. Miller	Maxwell E. Orr and Jed Burde	David Beeson & Merritt W. Wurts	Charlie Fritz & Bayard Plumb	
2018	Maxwell E. Orr and Thomas Fournaris	Not Played	Will Lichstein & Christopher Kenny	Graeme G. Herbert & Ethan M. Benstock	
2019	Maxwell E. Orr and Jed Burde	Tad E. Carney & Benet W. Polikoff	Graeme G. Herbert & Andrew T. Glaser	Brandon Wang & Wenqing Tang	
2023	Hollis Robertson and Nick Agger	Jack Elriani & Marc Voloshin	Reed Morris & Jacob Price	Patrick Chang & Peter Pierce	
2024	Will Newman and William Newton	Ethan Chan & Christian Wee	Johnny Wyant & Vance Daggett	Not Played	
2025	Jack Elriani & Marc Voloshin	Johnny Wyant & Vance Daggett	Peter Pierce & Patrick Chung	Not Played	

== Junior Girls ==
	u19	u17	u15	u13	u11
1991			Katharine Childs/Laurie Sykes		
1992		Laurie Sykes/Stephanie Teaford			
1993			Dana Betts/Julia Beaver		
1994		Lindsay Wilber/Blair Irwin	Dana Betts/Julia Beaver		
1995	Lindsay Wilber/Blair Irwin	Dana Betts/Julia Beaver			
1996		Blair Morris/Elizabeth Geddes		Caroline Schuman/Ella Studdiford	Lindsay Raden/Freddie McNeely
1997	Elizabeth Geddes/Tara Galvin	Ally Pearson/Avery Broadbent	Lauren McCrery/Lindsay Raden		
1998	Lindsay Raden/Amy Gross		Lindsay Raden/Amy Gross		
1999	Lauren McCrery/Lindsay Raden	Lauren McCrery/Lindsay Raden			Maxi Prinsen/Emery Maine
2000	Amy Gross/Avery Broadbent		Maxi Prinsen/Emery Maine		
2001			Ali Brady/Emery Maine	Toby Eyre/Emily Park	
2002	Amy Gross/Lauren McCrery		Toby Eyre/Emily Park		
2003		Emery Holton/Shannon Harrington			
2004		Ali Brady/Maxi Prinsen	Emery Holton/Shannon Harrington	Lexi Saunders/Sarah Mumanachit	Amanda Roberts/Tara Harrington
2005	Logan Greer/Anne Medeira			Libby Eyre/Skyler Bouchard	
2006			Amanda Roberts/Tara Harrington		
2007			Amanda Roberts/Tara Harrington		
2008	Emily Park/Julie Cerullo		Annie Ballaine/Haley Mendez	Caroline East/Sabrina Sobhy	
2009			Maria Elena Ubina/Katie Tutrone		
2010		Olivia Fiechter/Sabrina Sobhy		Sawyer Chilton/Morgan Steelman	
2011	Alisa Agnew/Jillian Baker		Maddie o\'Connor/Alison Richmond	Lindsay Stanley/Scarlett Bergam	
2012		Sarah Hopton/Madison Sangster-Newbery		Dancia Deverill/Lindsay Kuracina	
2013	Sawyer Chilton/Diane J. Tyson	Samira E. Baird/Julia D. Buchholz	Haley C. Aube/Caroline Spahr		
2014	Sawyer Chilton/Diane J. Tyson	Not Played	Not Played	Not Played	
2015	Casey S. Wong/Caroline Spahr	Not Played	Elisabeth Ross/Elizabeth Lentz	Not Played	
2016	Elisabeth Ross/Elizabeth Lentz	Not Played	Rachel L. Mashek/Caroline Burt	Not Played	
2017	Rachel L. Mashek/Olivia Walsh	Not Played	Emily A. Schuster/Abigail E. Schuster	Quincy D. Cline/Alysa Ali	
2018	Rachel L. Mashek/Olivia Walsh	Not Played	Mary Kacergis/Nathalie Taylor	Alexandra Jaffe & Samantha Jaffe	
2019	Rachel L. Mashek/Olivia Walsh	Grace M. Lavin/Whitney D. Taylor	Maeve Baker/Celia Salvatore	Alexandra Jaffe & Samantha Jaffe	
2023	Emma R. Trauber/Eleanor T. Clifford		Layla Gupta/Minnie Kim		
2024	Grace Fazzinga/Charlotte Pastel	Kaitlyn Vahlsing/Caitlin Buford			
2025	Alexandra Jaffe & Samantha Jaffe	Kaitlyn Vahlsing/Caitlin Buford			

== Century Doubles ==
	Century Open	Century Legends	Century Grand Masters	Century Mixed
2008	Michael Pierce & Morris Clothier	Jim McLain & Jamie McLain		Susan Dale & Christopher W. Gould
2009	Ned Edwards & Rich Sheppard	Eric Baldwin & John Fauquier		Cairn Meek & Molson Robertson
2010	Jeff Stanley & Gordon Anderson	Ryan O’Connell & Ken Leung	Michael Puertas & George Fowler	Victor Harding & Lee Belknap
2011	Albert G. Tierney, III & Doug Lifford	Scott Stoneburgh & Tony Ross	Tim Loat & David Bogert	Karen Jerome & Christopher W. Gould
2012	Eric Vlcek & James A. Heldring	Scott Stoneburgh & Tony Ross	Dylan J. Patterson & Michael Wilson	Natalie Grainger & Pug Winokur
2013	Eben Hardie & William J. Villari	Scott Stoneburgh & Tony Ross	Aaron Zimmerman & Barlett H. McGuire	Libby E. Welch & Palmer Page
2014	Albert G. Tierney, III & Steven A. Scharff	David J. Rosen & Stanley H. Dorney	Thomas Poor & Jonathan P. Hyett	Stephanie Hewitt & Thomas Boldt
2015	Albert G. Tierney, III & Steven A. Scharff	Malcolm Davidson & Chris O'Brien	Scott Stoneburgh & Tony Ross	Latasha Khan & Christopher W. Gould
2016	Nigel Thain & Dominic Hughes	Palmer Page & Patrick Chifunda	Edward J. Minskoff & William B. Hartigan	Dana A. Betts & Gordon D.H. Anderson
2017	Nigel Thain & Dominic Hughes	Ryan O'Connell & Tim Griffin	Edward J. Minskoff & William B. Hartigan	Will Carlin & Beth Ann Fedorowich
2018	Nigel Thain & Dominic Hughes	Scott Devoy & Andrew Nehrbas	Edward J. Minskoff & William B. Hartigan	Natalie Grainger & Steve Mandel
2019	Chris Walker & Thomas W. Harrity	Albert G. Tierney, III & Patrick Molloy	R. Clark Amos & Matthew Jenson	Christian C.F. Spahr, Jr. & Mary B. McKee
2020	Chris Walker & Thomas W. Harrity	Palmer Page & Cameron Pilley	Rishi Tandon & Kenneth Leung	Christian C.F. Spahr, Jr. & Mary B. McKee
2021	Not played			
2022	Michael Puertas & Nathan K. Dugan	Christopher Haley & Thowas W. Harrity	John Brazilian & Kyle Martino	Not played
2023	Chris Walker & Thomas W. Harrity	Steve Mandel & Randy Lim	James D. Marver & Zeke Scherl	Natalie Grainger & William Ullman
2024	Jeff J. Stanley & Carl J. Baglio	Steve Mandel & Randy Lim	Albert G. Tierney, III & Ryan J. Mullaney	Narelle T. Krizek & Edmund Garno
2025	Charlie Humber & Martin Heath	Rick Wahlstedt & Jonny P. Smith	Albert G. Tierney, III & Ryan J. Mullaney	V. Vaughan Schmidt & Giorgio Richelli
2026	Steven A. Scharff & Adrian Griffin	Rick Wahlstedt & Jonny P. Smith	Bill Hubbard & Rahul Sehrawat	Radhika Cobb & Thomas W. Harrity

== Intercollegiate ==
=== Men's ===
Year	Winners
1942	Larry Austin & Sands (Dartmouth College)
1948	Kingsley & Seymour Knox (Yale University)
1950	R. Allen & R. Dickinson (Williams College)
1951	Rick Austin & Steve Foster (Dartmouth College)
1953	Charles Warner & Ben Edwards (Princeton University)
1954	Dan Hutchinson & Roland Nordie (United States Military Academy)
1956	Jones & Eels (Williams College)
1988	Keen Butcher & Roy Rubin (Princeton University)
1989	Alex Dean & Erik Wohlgemuth (Yale University)
1990	Alex Dean & Alex Darrow (Yale University)
1991	Alex Darrow & Garrett Frank (Yale University)
1992	Garrett Frank & Jamie Dean (Yale University)
1993	Jamie Dean & Reade Frank (Yale University)
1994	Jamie Dean & Reade Frank (Yale University)
1995	Rick Hartigan & David Kaye (Princeton University)
1996	Ben Fishman & Jack Wyant (Princeton University)
1997	Jess Berline & Mike Sabatine (Franklin & Marshall College)
1998	Preston Quick & Joseph Pentland (Trinity College)
1999	Akhil Behl & Duncan Pearson (Trinity College)
2000	Akhil Behl & Duncan Pearson (Trinity College)
2001	Duncan Pearson & Patrick Malloy (Trinity College)
2002	Dylan Patterson & Peter Carlin (Harvard University)
2003	Will Osnato & Dent Wilkens (Princeton University)
2004	Patrick Malloy & Coly Smith (Trinity College)
2005	Julian Illingworth & Trevor Rees (Yale University)
2006	Will Broadbent & Garnett Booth (Harvard University)
2007	Zach Linhart & Peter Cipriano (Bowdoin College)
2008	David Letourneau & Kimlee Wong (Princeton University)
2009	Trevor McGuinness & Tom Mattsson (University of Pennsylvania)
2010	Trevor McGuinness & Porter Drake (University of Pennsylvania)
2011	Ryan Mullaney & Gabe De Melo (Franklin & Marshall College)
2011	Trevor McGuinness & Thomas Mattsson (University of Pennsylvania)
2012	Todd Harrity & Taylor Tutrone (Princeton University)
2013	Andrew McGuinness & Hunter Beck (United States Naval Academy)
2014	Neil Cordell & Mario Yanez (University of Rochester)
2015	Senen Ubina & Billy Kacergis (United States Naval Academy)
2016	Jack Herold & Randall Beck (United States Naval Academy)
2017	Jack Herold & Senen Ubina (United States Naval Academy)
2018	Michael P. Kacergis & Senen Ubina (United States Naval Academy)
2019	Michael P. Kacergis & Jonathan R. Lentz (United States Naval Academy)
2020	Not Played
2021	Not Played
2022	Maxwell E. Orr & Nadav Raziel (Yale University)
2023	Griffin M. Manley & Dylan Deverill (University of Western Ontario)
2024	Griffin M. Manley & Josh Kay (University of Western Ontario)
2025	Wenqing Tang & Hudson Poirier (United States Naval Academy)
2026	Johan Hodgson & Christian Graziano (United States Naval Academy)

=== Women's ===
Year	Winners
2011	Cece Cortes & Sarah Mumanachit (Harvard University)
2012	Nabilla Ariffin & Pia Trikha (University of Pennsylvania)
2013	Natalie Babjukova & Ashley Tidman (Trinity)
2014	Maria Elena Ubina & Rachel Leizman (Princeton University)
2015	Maria Elena Ubina & Olivia Weaver (Princeton University)
2016	Maria Elena Ubina & Olivia Weaver (Princeton University)
2017	Lindsay H. Stanley & Julia D. Buchholz (University of Pennsylvania)
2018	Not Played
2019	Lindsay H. Stanley & Jessica Davis (University of Pennsylvania)
2020	Not Played
2021	Not Played
2022	Sydney Maxwell & Olivia Walsh (University of Virginia)
2023	Rachel L. Mashek & Danielle Benstock (Brown University)
2024	Renee C. Chan & Advita Sharma (Columbia University)
2025	Alexandra Jaffe & Samantha Jaffe (Princeton University)
2026	Vicki Lai & Eloise Levin (Cornell University)

=== Mixed ===
Year	Winners
2012	Collen Fehm & Trevor McGuinness (University of Pennsylvania)
2013	Collen Fehm & Daniel Judd (University of Pennsylvania)
2014	Samuel Kang & Maria Elena Ubina (Princeton University)
2015	Samuel Kang & Maria Elena Ubina (Princeton University)
2016	Anaka Alankamony & George Lemmon (University of Pennsylvania)
2017	Sherilyn Yang & Sanjay Jeeva (Franklin & Marshall College)
2018	Not Played
2019	Julia D. Buchholz & James Flynn (University of Pennsylvania)
2020	Not Played
2021	Not Played
2022	Rachel L. Mashek & Blake Roshkoff (Brown University)
2023	Rachel L. Mashek & Blake Roshkoff (Brown University)
2024	Rachel L. Mashek & Blake Roshkoff (Brown University)
2025	Not Played
2026	Kaavya Bansal & Arhan Chandra (Columbia University)

== Records ==
=== Most Overall Titles by University ===
Name	Titles
Princeton University	12
University of Pennsylvania	10
Yale University	8
U.S. Naval Academy	8
Trinity College (Connecticut)	5
Brown University	4
Harvard University	3
Franklin & Marshall College	3
Columbia University	2
Dartmouth College	2
Williams College	2
University of Western Ontario	2
University of Virginia	1
University of Rochester	1
Bowdoin College	1
U.S. Military Academy	1
Cornell University	1

== Mixed ==
=== Father/son ===
	Open	Century	u17	u15	u13
2005	Robert Wimmer & Noah Wimmer		Simon Aldrich & Dillon Aldrich		Bill Greer & Xander Greer
2006	Will Simonton & Scott Simonton	Eric Vlcek & John Vlcek	Rob Berner & Robbie Berner		Larry Hilbert & Patrick Hilbert
2007	Steven Park & Gregory Park	Sam Jernigan & Kevin Jernigan	John Ervasti & Jack Ervasti		Peter Stokes & Spencer Stokes
2008	Steven Park & Gregory Park	Jim McLain & Jamie McLain	Michael Scherl & Zeke Scherl	Larry Hilbert & Patrick Hilbert	Carson Spahr & Christian C.F. Spahr
2009	Steven Park & Gregory Park	James Zug & James W. Zug, Jr.	Ronald Tutrone & Taylor Tutrone	Peter Stokes & Spencer Stokes	Carson Spahr & Christian C.F. Spahr
2010	Joshua Schwartz & Sanford Schwartz	Jack Wyant & John H.Wyant	George Lemmon & George B. Lemmon	David Ganek & Harry Ganek	Carson Spahr & Chris Spahr
2011	George Lemmon, Jr. & George B. Lemmon	Tom Poor & Morgan Poor	Christian C.F. Spahr, Jr. & Carson Spahr	Henry C. Parkhurst & Charles H. Parkhurst	Raymond Pepi & William Pepi
2012	George Lemmon, Jr. & George B. Lemmon	James W. Zug & James W. Zug, Jr.	Charles H. Parkhurst & Henry C. Parkhurst	Robert Brownell & Tim Brownell	Bo Anderson & Todd Anderson
2013	Carson Spahr & Christian C.F. Spahr, Jr.	R. Clark Amos & Preston C. Amos	Harry C. Curtis & Samuel W. Curtis	Not Played	Peter S. Miller & Peter C. Miller
2014	George Lemmon, Jr. & George B. Lemmon	R. Clark Amos & Preston C. Amos	Max A. Finkelstein & Michael L. Finkelstein	Deven S. Kanwal & Amrit Kanwal	Not Played
2015	Carson Spahr & Christian C.F. Spahr, Jr.	R. Clark Amos & Preston C. Amos	Raymond Pepi & William Pepi	Deven S. Kanwal & Amrit Kanwal	Jacob Koeppel & Seth H. Koeppel
2016	Carson Spahr & Christian C.F. Spahr Jr.	R. Clark Amos & Preston C. Amos	Deven S. Kanwal & Amrit Kanwal	Not Played	Jacob Koeppel & Seth H. Koeppel
2017	Charles H. Parkhurst & Henry C. Parkhurst	R. Clark Amos & Preston C. Amos	Deven S. Kanwal & Amrit Kanwal	Andrew A. Orr & Maxwell E. Orr	Ivan Martinez & Will Martinez
2018	Dominic Hughes & Ben Hughes	R. Clark Amos & Preston C. Amos	Deven S. Kanwal & Amrit Kanwal	James Hewitt & Jack Hewitt	Scott Poirier & Hudson Poirier
2019	George Lemmon, Jr. & George B. Lemmon	R. Clark Amos & Preston C. Amos	James Hewitt & Jack Hewitt	Scott Poirier & Hudson Poirier	Andrew Matuch & Xan Matuch
2022	Robby Berner & Robert L. Berner III	Not Played	Scott Poirier & Hudson Poirier	Andrew Matuch & Xan Matuch	Not Played
2023	Henry C. Parkhurst & Charles H. Parkhurst	William B. Hartigan & Anthony F. Hartigan	Scott Poirier & Hudson Poirier	Charlie Roberson & Owen Roberston	Daniel Veinier & Elliot Veinier
2024	Robby Berner & Robert L. Berner III	Philip Barth III & Charlie Barth	Andrew Matuch & Xan Matuch	Not Played	Not Played
2025	Carson Spahr & Christian C.F. Spahr Jr.	Ford Manion & F. Stafford Manion	Owen Roberson & Charlie Roberson	Not Played	Not Played
2026	Dominic Hughes & Josh Hughes	James Woods & Michael Woods	Not Played	Not Played	Christopher Lowell & James Lowell

=== Siblings ===
Title	Brother/Brother	Brother/Sister	Sister/Sister
2008	Matt Jenson & Dan Jenson	Preston Quick & Meredeth Quick	Narelle Krizek & Tarsh McEilhinney
2009	Tim Wyant & Jack Wyant	Chris Reigeluth & Caroline Reigeluth	Julia Drury & Lauralynn Drury
2010	Preston Quick & Meredeth Quick	Katie Tutrone & Taylor Tutrone	Katherine Rowan & Marie Vlcek

== See also ==
- U.S. SQUASH
- Squash Doubles
- United States Open (squash)
- US Junior Open squash championship
- Men's National Champions (Squash)
- Women's National Champions (Squash)
