= Peter Briggs (squash player) =

American squash player

Peter Briggs is the longtime Director of Squash at The Apawamis Club in Rye, New York, and a member of the U.S. Squash Hall of Fame.

== Early career ==
Peter Sheffield Briggs, the son of English parents and a native of Greenwich, Connecticut, first learned squash at the Field Club in his home town. He continued to pursue racquet sports at Middlesex School in Concord, Massachusetts where he also excelled in soccer. Briggs played #1 on the tennis team for 3 years and served as its captain in 1968 and 1969. He was considered one of the Private School Tennis League's best players. In his senior year he claimed a victory in the Class A competition over David Talbott from Deerfield (the brother of his future doubles partner Mark Talbott) in the 1969 New England Squash Tournament. He also led Middlesex to the team title in squash.

As a freshman at Harvard University, he secured the top seed spot on the varsity Harvard Crimson men's squash team and was ranked #1 in the country. An intercollegiate champion, Briggs became Captain of the Crimson squash team and Harvard won the NCAA title that year. His squash coach at Harvard was Jack Barnaby, considered by many to be the most successful coach in Harvard history; Barnaby also coached Briggs in tennis.

In January 1973, Briggs would win the singles final at the 31st Apawamis Club Invitational, nearly 15 years before he would become the head pro there. He finished his senior year, receiving a BA in classics. Immediately after graduation, Briggs was hired to co-coach the Radcliffe tennis and squash teams with a fellow squash teammate, Dan Gordon. That same year, he also co-founded a sports apparel business named Boast with a group of fellow Ivy League athletes. A lefthander, Briggs won the Apawamis Invitational again in 1975.

He reached the finals in singles at the 1975 U.S. Nationals, at which he played against four-time singles champion Victor Niederhoffer.After losing in straight sets, he said: " I knew I'd have to play the best game I'd ever played to beat him. But he's getting better and better. He's the best.

Adept at both squash singles and doubles, Briggs went on to win the US Squash Doubles Championship in 1976 with partner Ralph Howe. In the same year, he won the Mexican Nationals in singles, the Canadian Doubles and the U.S. Nationals in singles. Howe would be his partner for four years.

At the same time that he competed on the courts, Briggs held a day job as a corporate trader at Kidder, Peabody & Co. eventually moving to Merrill Lynch. Squash won him over in 1984 and his career changed directions after almost 10 years in the financial arena.

== Coaching ==
Briggs was hired as head squash coach and the assistant tennis coach at Cornell for 4 years starting in 1984. He guided his squash players to a 58–39 record. Under his leadership, the 1987-88 Cornell squash team became the first Cornell squash team to finish nationally in the top 10 (they ranked 9 at the end of their season). That same year his personal squash record expanded as he won no fewer than six professional events with four different partners and also won the US Mixed Doubles Championship with partner Joyce Davenport. His doubles partners included Mark Talbott with whom he was partnered in 1984 and 1985.

Briggs left Cornell in 1988 to begin coaching squash at The Apawamis Club downstate in Westchester. Under his more than three decade tenure, the squash program has regularly trained nationally ranked male and female students, many of whom have gone on to compete at or become captains of top Northeast collegiate teams including Harvard, Yale, Princeton University, Trinity College, Middlebury College and Amherst College. Even while coaching at Apawamis, Briggs continued to personally compete in tournaments. In 1989 he played on the U.S. team at the World Championships in Kuala Lumpur with his friend Mark Talbott and others.

== Awards ==
Briggs received recognition as a member of the Harvard Squash Hall of Fame, Class of 1996 for being a three-time All-Ivy and All-American. His prep school alma mater, Middlesex, elected him to their Hall of Fame in 2003. In 2005, he was inducted into the US Squash Hall of Fame in recognition of his positive impact and influence on the sport.

== Philanthropy ==
The competitive biennial Briggs Doubles Cup benefiting CitySquash is named for him and considered one of the premier tournaments on the circuit. Briggs was himself a board member of this urban youth enrichment program which raises scholarship funds for academically oriented students and has been based at Fordham University since 2002. The Briggs Cup has been held every two years since 2003 and offers the largest monetary prize on the tour circuit. As the first of its kind, the tournament has become a model of fundraising for urban youth programs all over the United States. The Briggs Cup attracts the top players in the world not only because it is "the biggest event of the season, but it’s one of the best run events on the tour" according to one of the top entrants.

== Personal life ==
Briggs first marriage ended amicably in divorce. He and his wife Diane live in Pound Ridge. He has two sons and a daughter.
