= Women's US National Champions (squash) =

The Women's National Champions are the National Champions for squash in the United States. These winners are the officially recognized champions by US Squash, the national governing body. From 1907 until 1994, the national championship was contested through hardball squash. When the national governing body began recognizing international softball as the official game in the United States, the national championship also switched to softball. The first softball Women's National Championship was conducted in 1994 and was won by Demer Holleran. The softball Women's National Championship, unlike the previous hardball championship, is limited to U.S. citizens only. The National Hardball Championship would continue past this date, but was no longer recognized as the official Women's National Championship.

== Women's National Champions ==
Name	Year
Eleonora Sears	1928
Margaret Howe	1929
Hazel H. Wightman	1930
Ruth Banks	1931
Margaret Howe	1932
Susan Noel	1933
Margaret Howe	1934
Margot Lumb	1935
Ann Page	1936
Ann Page	1937
Cecile Bowes	1938
Ann Page	1939
Cecile Bowes	1940
Cecile Bowes	1941
Ann Page	1947
Cecile Bowes	1948
Janet R. M. Morgan	1949
Betty Howe Constable	1950
Jane Austin	1951
Peggy Howe	1952
Peggy Howe	1953
Lois Dilks	1954
Janet R. M. Morgan	1955
Betty Howe Constable	1956
Betty Howe Constable	1957
Betty Howe Constable	1958
Betty Howe Constable	1959
Margaret Varner	1960
Margaret Varner	1961

Name	Year
Margaret Varner	1962
Margaret Varner	1963
Ann Wetzel	1964
Joyce V. Davenport	1965
Betty Meade	1966
Betty Meade	1967
Betty Meade	1968
Joyce V. Davenport	1969
Nina Moyer	1970
Carol Thesieres	1971
Nina Moyer	1972
Gretchen V. Spruance	1973
Gretchen V. Spruance	1974
Virginia Akabane	1975
Gretchen V. Spruance	1976
Gretchen V. Spruance	1977
Gretchen V. Spruance	1978
Heather McKay	1979
Barbara Maltby	1980
Barbara Maltby	1981
Alicia McConnell	1982
Alicia McConnell	1983
Alicia McConnell	1984
Alicia McConnell	1985
Alicia McConnell	1986
Alicia McConnell	1987
Alicia McConnell	1988
Demer Holleran	1989
Demer Holleran	1990

Name	Year
Demer Holleran	1991
Demer Holleran	1992
Demer Holleran	1993
Demer Holleran	1994
Ellie Pierce	1995
Demer Holleran	1996
Demer Holleran	1997
Latasha Khan	1998
Demer Holleran	1999
Latasha Khan	2000
Shabana Khan	2001
Latasha Khan	2002
Latasha Khan	2003
Latasha Khan	2004
Latasha Khan	2005
Latasha Khan	2006
Natalie Grainger	2007
Natalie Grainger	2008
Natalie Grainger	2009
Natalie Grainger	2010
Natalie Grainger	2011
Amanda Sobhy	2012
Natalie Grainger	2013
Sabrina Sobhy	2014
Amanda Sobhy	2015
Amanda Sobhy	2016
Olivia Blatchford	2017
Amanda Sobhy	2018
Olivia Blatchford	2019

Name	Year
Cancelled due to the Coronavirus Pandemic	2020
Cancelled due to the Coronavirus Pandemic	2021
Amanda Sobhy	2022
Amanda Sobhy	2023
Olivia Weaver	2024
Olivia Weaver	2025
Olivia Weaver	2026

The championship was not held in 1942-1946 due to World War II, or in 2020 and 2021 to the COVID-19 pandemic.

== Records ==
=== Most Overall Titles ===
Name	Titles
Demer Holleran	9
Latasha Khan	7
Alicia McConnell	7
Natalie Grainger	6
Amanda Sobhy	6
Gretchen Spruance	5
Betty Howe Constable	5
Cecile Bowes	4
Ann Page	4
Margaret Varner	4
Margaret Howe	3
Betty Meade	3
Olivia Weaver	3
Olivia Blatchford	2
Nina Moyer	2
Barbara Maltby	2
Joyce Davenport	2

=== Most University Alumni Titles ===
Name	Titles
University of Pennsylvania	13
Princeton University	12
University of Washington	8
Harvard University	8
University of Southern California	4
Texas Woman's University	4
University of California-Berkeley	1
Trinity College (Connecticut)	1
Ursinus College	1

=== Most High School Alumni Titles ===
Name	Titles
Phillips Exeter	9
North Shore High School (New York)	7
St. Mary's Diocesan School for Girls, Pretoria	6
Wilmington Friends School	5
Brimmer And May School	5
Germantown Friends School	3
Lower Merion High School	2

== See also ==
- US Junior Open squash championship
- U.S. Squash
- Men's US National Champions (squash)
