= Vosters =

Vosters can be both a middle name and a surname. Notable people with the name include:

- Gretchen Vosters Spruance (born 1947), American tennis and squash player
- Bunny Vosters (1919–1999), American tennis and squash player, mother of the above
