= Neil Sullivan (disambiguation) =

Neil Sullivan is a former English footballer

Neil Sullivan may also refer to:

- Neil Sullivan (footballer, born 1903) (1903–1988), English footballer
- Neil J. Sullivan (died 1970), American squash player
- Neil S. Sullivan (born 1942), American professor of physics

== See also ==
- Neil O'Sullivan (1900–1968), Australian politician
