= Professional Squash Association =

Sport association

- Sport: Squash
- Jurisdiction: International
- Abbreviation: PSA
- Founded: 1975
- Location: Leeds, England, United Kingdom
- President: (India) Saurav Ghosal; (England) Sarah-Jane Perry
- Chairman: (Saudi Arabia) Ziad Al-Turki
- CEO: (Wales) Alex Gough
- Director: (Egypt) Ahmad Bassam; (England) Amanda Sobhy; (United States) Ashley Bernhard; (England) Mohamed El Shorbagy; (United States) John Nimick
- Sponsor: Dunlop

Official website
- www.psasquashtour.com
- Other key staff: Operations Officer; (England) Lee Beachill; Commercial Officer; (Netherlands) Tommy Berden; Refereeing Director; (England) Lee Drew; Tour Development; (England) Andy Malley
- 2026–27 PSA Squash Tour

The Professional Squash Association, or simply the PSA, is the governing body for the men's and women's professional squash circuit. The body operates in a similar fashion to the ATP and the WTA for tennis. The PSA's highest professional level, the PSA Squash Tour involves over 250 tournaments annually around the world. Over 1,200 players from five continents and more than 60 countries are registered with the PSA. Rankings are updated weekly based on performances.

== Squash Tour ==
PSA Squash Tour comprises the most important tournaments in prize money for more experienced and higher-ranked players, including the World Championship and Tour Finals, labelled as following:

- Diamond Tier: 48-player draws for $300,000
- Platinum Tier: 48-player draws for $190,000
- Gold Tier: 24-player draws for $100,000
- Silver Tier: 24-player draws for $75,000
- Bronze Tier: 24-player draws for $50,000
- Copper Tier: 24-player draws for $25,000

Every year, the top eight performers compete in the PSA Squash Tour Finals. The players are separated into two groups of four, and play a round robin. The top two from each group advance to the semifinals (A1 vs B2; B1 vs A2). The winner of the event is crowned the World Tour champion.

Tournament			Ranking Points						
Rank	Prize Money US$	Ranking Points	Winner	Runner up	3/4	5/8	9/16	17/32	33/48
World Championship	$600,000	27683 points	3500	2275	1400	875	525	321	196
Diamond	$300,000	24511 points	3100	2015	1240	775	465	284	173.5
Platinum	$190,000	17132 points	2800	1820	1120	700	420	257	
Gold	$100,000	11010 points	1800	1170	720	450	270	165	
Silver	$75,000	8261.5 points	1350	877.5	540	337.5	202.5	124	
Bronze	$50,000	5505 points	900	585	360	225	135	82.5	
Copper	$25,000	3061 points	500	325	200	125	75	46	

== Challenger Tour ==
PSA Challenger Tour tournaments are entry point for young and upcoming professionals progressing through to a more international level of competition. It offers $3,000–$30,000 prize money and is the ideal circuit for less-experienced and upcoming players.

- PSA Challenger 30 — $30,000
- PSA Challenger 20 — $20,000
- PSA Challenger 15 — $15,000
- PSA Challenger 12 — $12,000
- PSA Challenger 9 — $9,000
- PSA Challenger 6 — $6,000
- PSA Challenger 3 — $3,000

PSA Challenger Tour			Ranking Points						
Rank	Prize money US$	Ranking Points	Winner	Runner up	3/4	5/8	9/16	17/32	33/48
Challenger 30	$30,000	2814 points	525	345	210	130	78	47.5	
Challenger 20	$20,000	1860 points	350	230	140	85	51	31.5	
Challenger 15	$15,000	1343 points	250	162.5	100	62.5	37.5	22.5	
Challenger 12	$12,000	1074 points	200	130	80	50	30	18	
Challenger 9	$9,000	806 points	150	97.5	60	37.5	22.5	13.5	
Challenger 6	$6,000	537 points	100	65	40	25	15	9	
Challenger 3	$3,000	331 points	65	40	25	15	9	5.5	

== Satellite Tour ==
PSA Satellite Tour comprises closed national championships or tournaments where entry is restricted to members of an association that promotes the tournament.

== Background ==
In January 2013, the PSA announced, along with U.S. Squash, the creation of a new tournament series called the US Pro Squash Series. This tournament series is used to support marketing activities for tournaments in the United States.

In November 2014, the WSA and the PSA announced a historic merger between the two associations. A decision was reached to designate the PSA operate as the governing body for both the women's and men's ranks from 1 January 2015.

On 7 December 2020 the PSA reached an agreement with Dunlop that extends Dunlop's tenure as the provider of official balls and official racquets for the PSA. The extension is three years.

== World rankings ==
=== Men's rankings ===
PSA Men's World Rankings as of 1 September 2025
Rank	Player	Points	Move^{†}
1	Mostafa Asal (EGY)	2,338	Steady
2	Diego Elías (PER)	1,631	Steady
3	Paul Coll (NZL)	1,153	Steady
4	Joel Makin (WAL)	1,096	Steady
5	Marwan Elshorbagy (ENG)	847	Steady
6	Karim Gawad (EGY)	811	Steady
7	Mohamed Elshorbagy (ENG)	794	Steady
8	Youssef Soliman (EGY)	616	Steady
9	Aly Abou Eleinen (EGY)	580	Steady
10	Youssef Ibrahim (EGY)	578	Steady

=== Women's rankings ===
PSA Women's World Rankings, of the 5 January 2026
Rank	Player	Average	Move^{†}
1	Hania El Hammamy (EGY)	1,791	Steady
2	Nouran Gohar (EGY)	1,578	Steady
3	Amina Orfi (EGY)	1,455	Steady
4	Nour El Sherbini (EGY)	1,324	Steady
5	Olivia Weaver (USA)	1,284	Steady
6	Satomi Watanabe (JPN)	881	Steady
7	Sivasangari Subramaniam (MAS)	869	Steady
8	Tinne Gilis (BEL)	755	Steady
9	Fayrouz Aboelkheir (EGY)	753	Steady
10	Georgina Kennedy (ENG)	741	Steady

== Current champions ==
=== Men's ===
Tournament	Edition	Player
World Championship	2024-25	(Egypt) Mostafa Asal
World Number 1	Current	(Egypt) Mostafa Asal
World Tour Finals	2024-25	(Wales) Joel Makin

=== Women's ===
Tournament	Edition	Player
World Championship	2024-25	(Egypt) Nour El Sherbini
World Number 1	Current	(Egypt) Nouran Gohar
World Tour Finals	2024-25	(Egypt) Nouran Gohar

== Awards ==
- PSA Awards

== Video game ==
PSA World Tour Squash 2015
- Developer: Team6 Game Studios
- Publisher: Alternative Software
- Platform: Wii
- Release: EU: 22 May 2015
- Genre: Sport simulation
- Mode: Single-player

A PSA-licensed video game titled PSA World Tour Squash 2015 has been developed by Team6 Game Studios and published by Alternative Software, and was released only in various European countries on 22 May 2015, exclusively for Nintendo's Wii console. The game features the likeness of several professional squash players such as Nick Matthew, Amr Shabana, Grégory Gaultier, Ramy Ashour, and many others, and takes place in many iconic, global squash courts. Players can compete in main World Tour, or set up their own tournaments with using custom player avatars and stats. The game also supports Wii MotionPlus, allowing users an enhanced, real-time squash motion control gameplay experience, and is the last ever game for the console to do so.

== See also ==
- PSA World Tour records
- Official Men's Squash World Ranking
- Official Women's Squash World Ranking
- World Squash Federation
- PSA Awards
- Women's Squash Association
