= Paul Assaiante =

American squash and tennis coach

Current position
- Title: Head coach
- Team: Trinity
- Conference: New England Small College Athletic Conference

Biographical details
- Education: Springfield College

Coaching career (HC unless noted)
- 1974–1985: Army
- 1987–1989: Williams College
- 1994–present: Trinity

Paul Assaiante is the Men’s Squash and Tennis coach at Trinity College in Hartford, Connecticut, and a professional speaker and author. Assaiante is a two-time Olympic Coach-of-the-Year.

Assaiante has led the Trinity men's squash team to seventeen national titles. From 1998-2012, Assaiante and Trinity won 252 consecutive matches, including thirteen national championships—the longest winning streak in college sports history. The steak came to an end when Yale defeated Trinity, 5-4, on January 18, 2012.

Assaiante is a 1974 graduate of Springfield College and holds a master's degree from Long Island University. He currently resides in West Hartford, Connecticut.

In 2014, a $2 million gift to US Squash established the Ganek Family US Squash Head National Coach Fund and Assaiante became the inaugural Ganek Family US Squash Head National Coach on a part-time basis. The position is currently the only endowed coaching position among the more than four dozen sports that are members of the United States Olympic & Paralympic Committee. Assaiante served in the Ganek Family US Squash Head National Coach role until 2021 when Ong Beng Hee of Malaysia was hired on a full-time basis.

In 2016, Assaiante was inducted into the U.S. Squash Hall of Fame.

== Professional career ==
Hartford, CT

- 2000-2007: Head Coach of the Hartford FoxForce, a member of World Team Tennis.

Trinity College, Hartford, CT

- 1994–present: Director of Racquet Sports
- 1995–present: Associate Professor of Physical Education
- 2000–present: Director of Athletic Development and College Relations
- 2000-2005: Director of Physical Education

US Squash

- 2014–2021: Ganek Family US Squash Head National Coach

Princeton Club of New York, New York, NY

- 1991-1994: Squash Professional

The Baltimore Country Club, Baltimore, MD

- 1989-1991: Director of Racquet Sports

Williams College, Williamstown, MA

- 1987-1989: Director of Racquet Sports, Assistant Professor

The Apawamis Club, Rye, NY

- 1985-1987: Director of Racquet Sports

United States Military Academy of West Point, NY

- 1974-1985: Professor and Coach

== Awards and Accomplishment ==
1998-2012: Longest consecutive winning streak of any college sport.

- Coaching Career Record: 1,024-140
- Squash Record at Trinity College: 468-21

2016: Inducted into U.S. Squash Hall of Fame

2010: Named U.S. National Squash Coach.

2010: Assaiante Tennis Center Dedicated at Trinity College.

2009: Inducted to the Springfield College Hall of Fame.

2003: U.S.Squash Racquets Association Presidents Award for his lifelong contribution to the sport.

2002: Arthur Hughes Award Recipient (Junior Professor of the Year), Trinity College.

2000: Hartford Courant Coach of the Century.

== Publications ==
- Run to the Roar: Coaching to Overcome Fear with James Zug (Penguin Books, 2010) ISBN 978-1-59184-364-1
- Championship Tennis by the Experts: How to Play Championship Tennis, with Vic Braden (Leisure Press, June 1979) ISBN 978-0-918438-23-2
