= US Pro Squash Series =

Details
- Event name: US Pro Squash Series
- Location: United States
- Website; Official website

Men's Winner
- Most recent champion(s): (Australia) Ryan Cuskelly (2015)

The U.S. Pro Squash Series is a series of irregular number of tournaments the PSA World Tour, which will be held under the ongoing season in the United States.

In January 2013, the Professional Squash Association announced along with U.S. Squash, to create a new tournament series called the US Pro Squash Series. Similar to the U.S. Open Series in tennis, this tournament series is used to support marketing activities for tournaments in the United States. For tournament series includes all PSA tournaments in the categories PSA Challenger and International on U.S. soil. Depending on the performance on these tournaments, players receive a certain score. At the end of the season, the three players are rewarded with the highest accumulated score with an additional prize money.

At the end of the season, the three players will be rewarded with the highest accumulated score with an additional prize money. The total is $10,000, of which the winner earn $5,000, second place $3,000 and third place $2,000.

== Past results ==
Year	Player	Points	Tournaments
2016	1.		
2016	2.		
2016	3.		
2015 (22 Tournaments)	1. (Australia) Ryan Cuskelly	1,380	5
2015 (22 Tournaments)	2. (Scotland) Alan Clyne	880	4
2015 (22 Tournaments)	3. (Mexico) César Salazar	620	4
2014 (22 Tournaments)	1. (New Zealand) Campbell Grayson	900	8
2014 (22 Tournaments)	2. (Australia) Ryan Cuskelly	775	7
2014 (22 Tournaments)	3. (United States) Todd Harrity	725	11
2013 (16 Tournaments)	1. (United States) Julian Illingworth	545	6
2013 (16 Tournaments)	2. (New Zealand) Campbell Grayson	495	6
2013 (16 Tournaments)	3. (Pakistan) Farhan Zaman	460	6

Note: A minimum of 4 tournaments is required

== See also ==
- Professional Squash Association
- U.S. Squash
- PSA World Series Finals
