= The Howe Cup =

- HC 2019 Poster

Tournament information
- Sport: Squash
- Location: United States
- Established: 1955
- Teams: 44
- Website: https://ussquash.org/womenandgirls/howe-cup/

Current champion
- San Francisco Olympic Team

The Howe Cup is an all-female American Squash team championship run since 1955 for all ages and abilities.

== About the Cup ==
=== Creation ===
The tournament started in 1928 as an inter-city competition between the cities of New York City, Philadelphia and Boston.

Pre 1983 there was no national level intercollegiate Squash tournament for women in the United States. College teams began to increase in popularity and size, and such a national level championship was called for.

In 1955 Virginia Griggs donated a permanent trophy, in honour of Margaret Howe and her daughters Betty and Peggy. The trophy and championship then became known as the Howe Cup

=== History ===
1928 the inner-city championship tournament begins its first 5-person matches.

1955 the tournament is renamed to The Howe Cup in honour of Margaret Howe and her twin daughters Betty Constable and Peggy White.

1958 'B Division' was created along with the 'B' trophy

1968 'C Division' is established with the donation of 'C Trophy'.

2008 'D Division' created with the trophy coming that year.

2009 because of the popularity of the cup, 4 divisions were opened. The divisions were named in honour of influential women's college squash players. (Aggie Kurtz, Dale Walker and Patrica Epps)

2020 The tournament is cancelled due to the ongoing COVID-19 pandemic.

== Winners list ==
Howe Cup Winners
| Year | A Division | B Division | C Division | D Division |
|---|---|---|---|---|
| 1955 | New York | // | // | // |
| 1956 | Philadelphia | // | // | // |
| 1957 | New York | // | // | // |
| 1958 | New York | Philadelphia | // | // |
| 1959 | Philadelphia | Philadelphia | // | // |
| 1960 | Philadelphia | Philadelphia | // | // |
| 1961 | Philadelphia | New York | // | // |
| 1962 | Philadelphia | New York | // | // |
| 1963 | Philadelphia | Philadelphia | // | // |
| 1964 | Philadelphia | New York | // | // |
| 1965 | Philadelphia | Philadelphia | // | // |
| 1966 | Philadelphia | Philadelphia | // | // |
| 1967 | Philadelphia | Philadelphia | // | // |
| 1968 | Philadelphia | Toronto-Montreal | Philadelphia | // |
| 1969 | New York | Philadelphia | Philadelphia | // |
| 1970 | New York | Philadelphia | Philadelphia | // |
| 1971 | New York | Philadelphia | Philadelphia | // |
| 1972 | New York | Montreal-Ottawa | Boston | // |
| 1973 | New York | Baltimore | Boston | // |
| 1974 | Philadelphia | Philadelphia | Boston | // |
| 1975 | Philadelphia | Boston | Boston | // |
| 1976 | Philadelphia | Baltimore | Boston | // |
| 1977 | Philadelphia | Philadelphia | Philadelphia | // |
| 1978 | Boston | Boston | New York | // |
| 1979 | New York | New York | New York | // |
| 1980 | New England | New York | New York | // |
| 1981 | New York | New York | New York | // |
| 1982 | New York | New York | New York | // |
| 1983 | New York | New York | New York | // |
| 1984 | Mid-Atlantic | New York | New England | // |
| 1985 | Mid-Atlantic | Mid-Atlantic | New England | // |
| 1986 | New York | Mid-Atlantic | Mid-Atlantic | // |
| 1987 | Mid-Atlantic | Boston | New York | // |
| 1988 | Mid-Atlantic | Boston | Philadelphia | // |
| 1989 | Philadelphia | Washington DC | Connecticut | // |
| 1990 | Boston | Washington DC | New York | // |
| 1991 | Boston | Philadelphia | Chicago | // |
| 1992 | Philadelphia | New York | Northern Ohio | // |
| 1993 | Boston 1 | Boston 1-hardball | Baltimore-softball Great Lakes | // |
| 1994 | New York 1 | San Francisco | Philadelphia | // |
| 1995 | Seattle | Florida | Philadelphia 1 | // |
| 1996 | Seattle | Seattle | Seattle 1 | // |
| 1997 | Philadelphia | Portland | Portland | // |
| 1998 | Philadelphia 1 | San Francisco | Baltimore | // |
| 1999 | Transylvania | San Francisco | Portland | // |
| 2000 | Boston | Boston | Baltimore 1 | // |
| 2001 | Boston 1 | New York 1 | Boston 1 | // |
| 2002 | Philadelphia | Boston 1 | New York 1 | // |
| 2003 | Boston | Seattle | Seattle 2 | // |
| 2004 | Boston 1 | Connecticut | Philadelphia 1 | // |
| 2005 | Philadelphia | Philadelphia | Philadelphia | // |
| 2006 | Boston 1 | Boston | Boston 1 | // |
| 2007 | Boston 1 | Connecticut 2 | New Jersey | // |
| 2008 | National Capital | Baltimore | Seattle | National Capital |
| 2009 | Seattle | California | Seattle | National Capital |
| 2010 | Philly A | Southport Squashettes | DC Squasher Grrls | Boston D |
| 2011 | National Capital A | Baltimore B1 | Baltimore C1 | Warwick D |
| 2012 | Seattle's Best | Team Theattle | National Capital Squashers | Seattle Sirens |
| 2013 | Philly A2 | Barn Louses | Merry Malbecs | Dartmouth Dames |
| 2014 | Four Corners | California Giants | Brooklyn Cyclones | DC Darlings |
| 2015 | Philly Annihilators | Fairfield County Flash – Yellow | Boston Knows Howe | Back Bay D-Vas |
| 2016 | NY Bleed Blue | Cabernet Canucks | Boston C-Party | Purple Reign |
| 2017 | National Capital Aces | Boston Queen B's | Boston C-Party | Philly One Hit Wonders |
| 2018 | Philly Phab Phive | Boasting Bellas | New York Racqueteers | Chicago D1 |
| 2019 | San Francisco | Washington DC Sharks | New York StreetSquash | Chi-Town Boasters |
| 2020 | Cancelled | Cancelled | Cancelled | Cancelled |
| 2021 | Philly A1 | New York B | Boston Queen | Philly D |
