= Bill Bewley =

Canadian football player and coach (1931–2019)

No. 80
- Positions: Running back, defensive back, placekicker

Personal information
- Born: August 11, 1931; Hamilton, Ontario, Canada
- Died: February 23, 2019 (aged 87); Toronto, Ontario, Canada
- Listed height: 5 ft 11 in (1.80 m)
- Listed weight: 190 lb (86 kg)

Career information
- College: Toronto

Career history

Playing
- 1953: Calgary Stampeders*
- 1954–1961: Montreal Alouettes
- 1965: Montreal Alouettes
- * Offseason and/or practice squad member only

Coaching
- 1962–1964: McGill
- 1966: Toronto Rifles (Assistant)

Head coaching record
- Career: 15–10–1 (.596)

William James Bewley (August 11, 1931 – February 23, 2019) was a Canadian professional football player and coach who played Montreal Alouettes from 1954 to 1961 and was the head coach at McGill University from 1962 to 1964. He made a comeback with the Alouettes in 1965, but retired during the season. He was a broadcaster for Canadian Football League games during the 1970s and was a champion squash player in the 1970s and 1980s.

== Playing ==
A native of Hamilton, Ontario, Bewley was a two-time league all-star (1951 and 1952) for the Toronto Varsity Blues football team. He signed with the Calgary Stampeders in 1953, but missed the entire season due to a broken jaw suffered in an intrasquad game. He took a teaching job in Hamilton and sought to join the Hamilton Tiger-Cats for the 1954 season, but the Montreal Alouettes had selected him in the 1953 IRFU college draft and refused to grant his release.

Bewley played running back, placekicker, and defensive back for the Alouettes from 1954 to 1961. He led the IRFU in scoring in 1958 and was the Alouettes' most outstanding Canadian in 1958, 1959, and 1960. He retired after the 1961 season to go into coaching, but returned to the Alouettes in 1965. He retired a second time that September. In 105 career games for the Alouettes, Bewley scored eight career touchdowns, including two on interception returns, made 28 field-goals, rushed for 814 yards on 155 carries, and made 135 receptions for 1,640 yards.

== Coaching ==
In 1962, Bewley succeeded former Alouette teammate Bruce Coulter as head coach of the McGill football team. In three season, he led the team to a 15–10–1 record. His 1962 team won the Yates Cup by defeating rival Queen's 15–13. After his second retirement from football, Bewley spent one season as an assistant coach with the Toronto Rifles.

== Later life ==
In 1965, Bewley joined Multipak, a packaging services company. He was transferred to their Toronto office and became Ontario sales manager. From 1968 to 1970, he was a colour commentator on CTV's Canadian Football League broadcasts. In 1971, he replaced Russ Jackson on the CFL on CBC. He spent three season with the CBC as a colour commentator and isolation director.

Bewley was a champion squash player, winning senior doubles titles with partner Jim Bentley. They won three Canadian Men's Doubles Championships (Men's 40+ in 1973 and 1974 and Men's 50+ in 1982) and three US Squash Doubles Championships (Men's 40+ in 1973, Men's 50+ in 1982, and Men's 55+ in 1988).

Bewley suffered a stroke in 2011. On February 23, 2019, he died from respiratory failure in North York General Hospital.
