= Bunny Vosters =

American tennis and squash player (1919–1999)

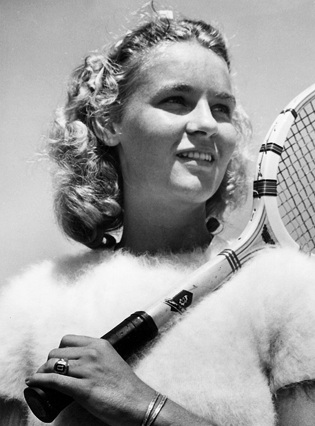
- Vosters in 1939
- Full name: Madge Harshaw Vosters
- Country (sports): United States
- Born: August 15, 1919
- Died: October 24, 1999 (aged 80)
- Height: 5 ft 9 in (175 cm)
- College: Ursinus College

Singles
- Highest ranking: USTA No. 9

Madge Harshaw "Bunny" Vosters (August 15, 1919 – October 24, 1999) was an American tennis and squash player. A top tennis player, and regarded as one of the all-time greatest doubles players in squash, she won several dozen national championships across both sports, many of them with her daughter, Gretchen Vosters Spruance. She was ranked among the top-10 singles players nationally in both sports during her career, and tied for the most doubles titles in American squash history, with her last national championship coming at the age of 58. Vosters was particularly dominant with her daughter in mother-daughter competitions, winning every match they played across a span of over 15 years, including many national titles.

== Early life ==
Vosters was born Madge Harshaw on August 15, 1919. Her parents, James and Ella Harshaw, were both tennis players in Philadelphia. From a young age, she received the nickname "Bunny". She grew up in Lansdowne, Pennsylvania, and competed in several sports growing up, including tennis, field hockey and basketball.

== Early career ==
Vosters's first competitive experience in tennis came at age 15, when she entered the Middle States Grass tournament in Philadelphia, on the suggestion of her sister. Participating in the girls' under-18 event, she won the competition. On her way to victory in the tournament, she defeated her sister Jean and also upset the fourth- and second-seeded participants before beating Evelyn Fry in the finals.

Later that year, Vosters finished as runner-up at the 1935 Philadelphia and District women's clay court tennis championship and reached the quarterfinals of the national junior championship. In January 1936, she placed first on the Middle States Lawn Tennis Association's girls rankings. That July, she won the girls' event at the Delaware state championships while finishing as runner-up in the women's event. The following month, Vosters finished as runner-up at the Philadelphia championship a second time. In 1937, she won her third straight Middle States junior title while reaching the semifinals in both singles and doubles at the national junior championships. She was runner-up at the Eastern States championship in singles in 1938, then came back to win the championship in 1939 while also finishing first at the Main Line tournament. Vosters retained both titles in 1940. In June 1940, she competed in the Philadelphia Tennis League, a men's tournament, becoming the first woman to ever participate. During the 1940 season, she was ranked third on the Middle States Top 10 list. Shortly before her marriage, she competed and won the Philadelphia and District title again in June 1941.

Vosters attended Ursinus College from 1936 to 1940. There, she competed in three sports: tennis, field hockey and basketball. A right halfback in field hockey, she was twice selected to the U.S. reserve national team, in 1941 and 1948. Vosters graduated from Ursinus in June 1940, at the age of 20. Afterwards, she became a teacher at the Friends School in Norristown, Pennsylvania, while continuing to play tennis. In addition to teaching, she also coached basketball, field hockey, tennis and cheerleading. She married to Francis Vosters, an architect, in 1941, and retired from teaching, while she continued playing tennis. She had three children with him – two daughters and a son. Her daughters, Gretchen Vosters Spruance and Nina Moyer, also played tennis and squash and sometimes competed with her in doubles matches.

== Post-college career ==
Vosters reached the finals of the Eastern States tournament in 1941 but was defeated by Peggy Welsh, her first defeat against a Philadelphia player in two years. She won the Philadelphia and District women's grass court championship in 1942, and that year was ranked by the United States Tennis Association (USTA) as the number one women's player in the middle states, while being ranked ninth nationally. She did not defend her Philadelphia title in 1943 and remained out of competition until 1946, having her first child during that time. Vosters won the Philadelphia title in 1946 upon her return. In July 1946, she also won the Pennsylvania and Eastern women's grass court championship in the doubles event, partnered with Barbara Strobhar Clement, and won the Middle States championship in both singles and doubles, partnered with Marion Jessup in the latter event. She was the top-ranked woman in the Middle States for the 1946 season. Vosters was out of competition in 1947 as she gave birth to her second child.

In 1948, Vosters reached the quarterfinals of the U.S. National Championships in the women's singles. She was also runner-up at the Middle States lawn tennis championship and the Philadelphia championship, while reaching the quarterfinals of the Seabright Invitational Tournament, then in 1949 reached the finals of the Middle States championship while winning the mixed doubles title at the Pennsylvania championships. Vosters was awarded the USTA Service Bowl award in 1949, given to the women's tennis player who contributed the most to "sportsmanship, fellowship and service of tennis" that year. She remained the top-ranked Middle States player for several years during the 1950s and won several more medals at the Middle States tournaments, including first in 1951 and 1952, second in 1953, first in 1954 and 1955, and second in 1956. She was also a Middle States doubles champion, paired with Margaret Osborne duPont. With duPont, she also won the doubles title of Pennsylvania, and Vosters also at times partnered with Vic Seixas, winning three Pennsylvania mixed doubles titles with him. Margaret Varner Bloss sometimes served as her doubles partner as well. Through the late 1950s, she was still ranked in the top-15 nationally by the USTA, and she frequently played matches against men. Her success in Middle States competitions led her to be selected as a Middle States representative in the Sears Cup, a regional tournament, for over 30 years. She sometimes served as captain of her Sears Cup team.

Vosters moved to Wilmington, Delaware, in 1952, and subsequently won many state championships in both singles and doubles play, the first in 1953. Doug Gelbert in The Great(er) Delaware Sports Book noted that "No one ever won as many tennis trophies in Delaware as Bunny Vosters." In the 1960s, when she was over age 40, Vosters began playing squash for the first time as well, later becoming one of the greatest doubles players of all time. She won her first national doubles championship in 1962, paired with Jeanne Classen, and went on to win 11 national doubles championships, tied for the all-time record. She was also a two-time runner-up at the national championships. Betty Meade and later her daughter Gretchen Spruance served as her doubles partners in her later national championship appearances. In 1964, she was selected captain of the U.S. Federation Cup team, which also included Billie Jean King, Nancy Richey, Karen Susman and Rosie Casals. Her family was named the USTA Family of the Year in 1964, later again in 1988, and the Middle States Family of the Year in 1965.

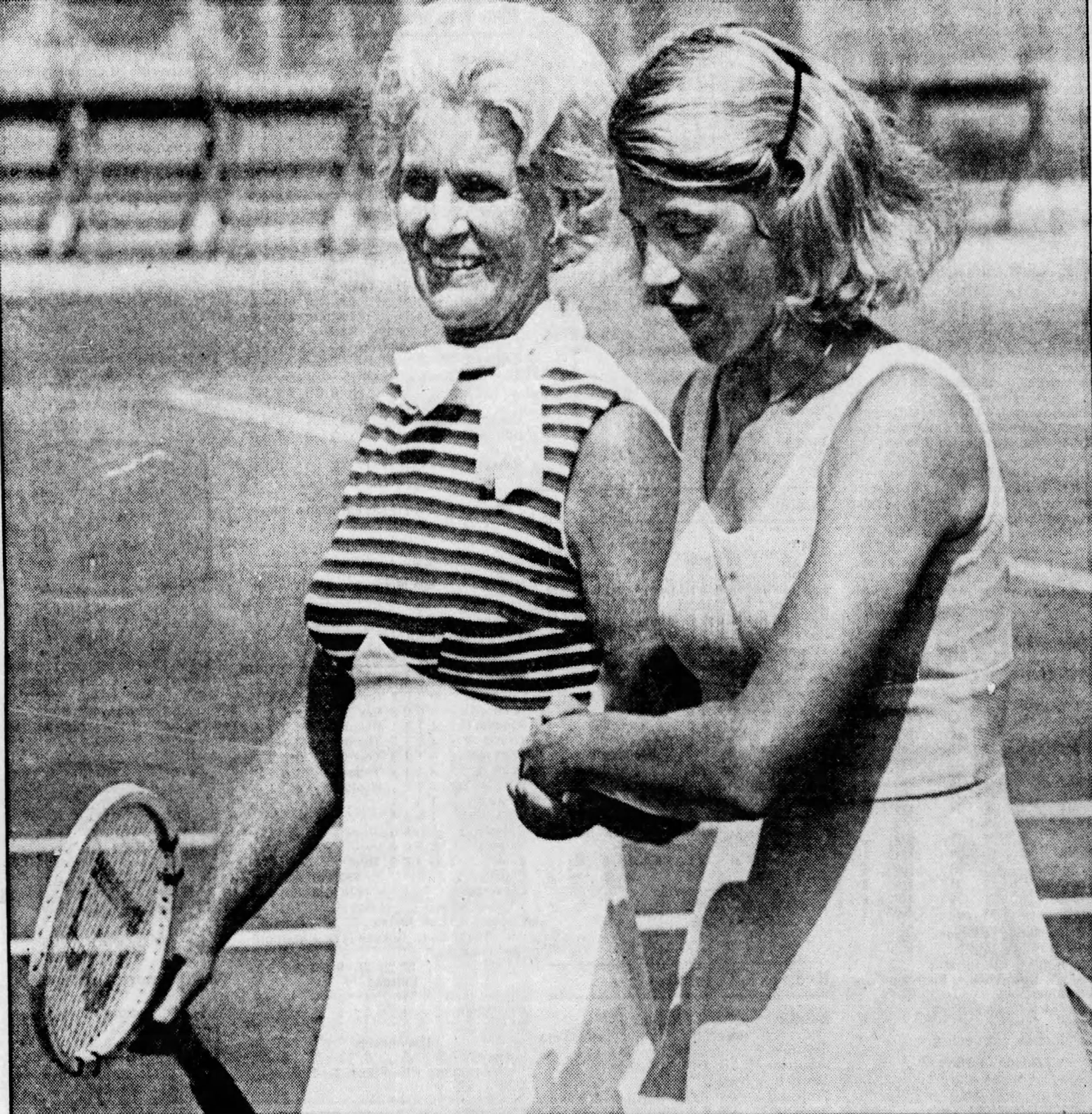
Vosters (left) with Gretchen in 1979

When Vosters's daughter Gretchen was age 16, they competed together and won in a mother-daughter tennis tournament for the first time, which began a long streak of success for them. The two won over 20 mother-daughter national championships combined on grass, clay, and hardcourt surfaces, while Vosters also won two championships paired with her other daughter Nina. Vosters won the grass court national mother-daughter championship from 1967 to 1971, from 1973 to 1975, and from 1977 to 1986, while winning the clay court titles from 1976 to 1980 and from 1983 to 1984, in addition to a hardcourt title in 1977. In 1977, they won on all three surfaces. For a period of over 15 years, her and her daughter Gretchen had never lost in mother-daughter play, which Robert Robinson of The Pensacola News noted was "without a doubt ... the longest winning streak in modern-day history". Robinson stated, "Bunny Vosters and Gretchen Spruance experience a sudden speech impediment when it comes to pronouncing the word lose. They simply can't say the word. Rather than say lose, they prefer to use it." Vosters said, "Oh, we know what it is – that's why we try to stay away from it," and when asked about how many matches they had won during their winning streak, she said, "Oh God, you're asking the impossible".

Vosters won a total of 26 USTA mother-daughter national championships, a record. She was also highly successful at senior women's national tennis championships, winning 22 titles there. This included a doubles championship in the women's over-40 category in 1974 and in over-50 play in 1975, along with doubles titles in over-55 play in 1981, 1982, 1984, and 1986. She was the over-55 singles champion in 1981, over-60 singles champion from 1984 to 1985, and over-65 champion from 1985 to 1986 and from 1988 to 1989, along with over-60 doubles titles in 1987 and 1988 and over-65 doubles titles in 1989, 1991, and 1992. She won the national senior doubles championship in squash four times as well, while her last national title in the open division in squash came when she was age 58, setting the record for oldest champion. During her squash career, she had a highest ranking of third nationally in singles. In total, she won 48 USTA national championships.

=== Playing style and legacy ===
As a tennis player, Vosters was known for "great accuracy and a nearly unretrievable drop shot". Her daughter described Vosters's playing style as "very consistent, very competitive", while they had a strategy to "try not to make errors, give encouragement to each other, and try to be steady". The Philadelphia Inquirer noted that, "They like to lob and work up to the net together. Patiently, they wait for an opening, and then attack." Vosters was known for her "grace and style on and off the court", with people who played with her describing her as "being unmatched in her will to win, though she never showed it with petulant actions when things didn't go her way. She never pouted, never argued a call and never made an opponent look bad." The Delaware Tennis Hall of Fame said of her that she "combined grace and athleticism with unparalleled sportsmanship in a tennis career that spanned a lifetime". The News Journal described Vosters as a role model for younger players while The Inquirer noted her to be "a heroine of ... senior women's athletics. By her example, she inspired sportswomen to continue competing well into their older years." Her popularity was such that the area of northern Delaware she lived in was called "Bunny Country".

During her career, Vosters played either tennis or squash seven days a week. She said that she was most proud of her play with her children: "To win with the children has been the most exciting [highlight]." Vosters attributed her success in her later years to her regular practice and exercise and said that, "I just feel that exercise helps you get through life so much better. It's done so much for me – I don't know how people get along without it." She was active in the promotion of racquet sports in her area, serving as president of the Philadelphia Women's Interclub Tennis Association and as a member of the International Lawn Tennis Club. With her husband, she helped the Delaware Foundation for Physical Education build tennis courts in the inner city of Wilmington.

Vosters considered age unimportant and never gave out her age publicly. She said that "everybody was too consumed with numbers". During her career, she often played and defeated opponents up to 20 years younger than herself.

== Personal life and honors ==
Vosters was an avid player of contract bridge. She also enjoyed sewing and often made the dresses she wore for tennis matches herself. She served as a board member and chair of the Visiting Nurse Association and chaired the Wilmington Flower Market. She suffered from cancer in her last years but remained active as a player. She died on October 24, 1999.

Vosters was inducted into the Ursinus College Hall of Fame in 1974. In 1980, she was inducted into the Delaware Sports Museum and Hall of Fame. The hall of fame had a rule that sportspeople had to have been retired for at least five years in order to be eligible, but an exception was made for Vosters as she "refuse[d] to quit playing". Her case was the first time the eligibility rule was ignored to induct an athlete. Vosters was inducted into the Delaware County chapter of the Pennsylvania Sports Hall of Fame in 1989 and into the USTA/Middle States Hall of Fame in 1994, as part of the inaugural induction class for the latter. She was also inducted into the Delaware Tennis Hall of Fame, into the Women's Collegiate Tennis Hall of Fame in 2006, and into the U.S. Squash Hall of Fame in 2019. An award named in her honor was awarded to Delaware high school tennis players who showed the best sportsmanship.
