= William F. Howe (general) =

United States Army general

William Francis Howe Jr. (1888 – November 10, 1952) was an American stockbroker and brigadier general who served in World War I and World War II.

== Life and career ==
Howe graduated from Yale University where he stood out as an athlete. From 1917 to 1919, he was commanding officer of 102nd Field Artillery Regiment on the Western Front. From 1941 to 1942, he was commanding officer of the 51st Field Artillery Brigade, after which he led the Army Training Schools at Yale from 1942 to 1943. From 1943, he was a professor at Yale University.

His wife was the squash champion Margaret Allen Howe. His children were the squash champions Betty Constable and Peggy White, and the sporting goods retailer William F. "Bill" Howe, a Yale baseball All-American in 1947.
