= Betty Constable =

American squash player and coach

Elizabeth Howe Constable (8 November 1924 – 9 September 2008) was an American pioneer in women's squash and was the first women's squash coach at Princeton University.

== Life and career ==
The first of twins born in Natick, Massachusetts, she graduated from Brimmer and May School in Chestnut Hill, Massachusetts. After serving in the American Red Cross during World War II.

Constable's mother Margaret Allen Howe (Mrs. William Francis Howe) and twin sister, Peggy Howe White were also women's national singles and doubles squash champions.

In 1971, Constable, who was already coaching women in squash, field hockey and tennis at Princeton University, began the first women's varsity squash team at Princeton. Her career there spanned 20 years.

The famed Howe Cup Championships (formerly known as the Tri-City Squash Championships) was renamed the Howe Cup in honor of the three Howe women-Margaret, Betty and Peggy. This tournament was originally played between top players from Philadelphia-New York-Boston. At that time these cities were the main centers of squash play in the U.S. The Howe Cup itself was donated by a contemporary and friend of the twins, Gig Griggs. Eventually, the sport grew large enough and was played in enough areas across the U.S. that the tournament came to be known also as the U.S. National Team Championships and had three flights-A, B and C.

In the early 1970s, Constable's mother, Margaret Howe, donated the collegiate Howe Cup, inaugurating the collegiate tier of Howe Cup play.

Constable was inducted into the United States Squash Hall of Fame in 2000. She died in Skillman, New Jersey.
