= Margaret Howe (squash player) =

American squash player (1897–1989)

Margaret Allen Howe
- Born: May 2, 1897
- Died: November 16, 1989 (aged 92)
- Burial place: Old North Cemetery, Nantucket, Massachusetts, US
- Known for: US squash champion (1929)
- Spouse: William Francis Howe
- Children: William Francis Howe Jr., Peggy White and Betty Howe Constable

Margaret Allen Howe (1897–1989) was a pioneer for Squash in America. She was born in Greenfield, Massachusetts. She won the U.S. Women's Squash Singles National Championship in 1929, 1932 and 1934 after giving birth to a son, William Francis Howe Jr., in 1922 and twin daughters (and future squash champions) Betty and Peggy in 1924.

Her husband, William "Bill" Francis Howe Sr., encouraged her to play, and she played under the name Mrs. William F. Howe. In 1929, Howe organized and won the first sanctioned women's squash tournament in the United States.

== Legacy ==
In 1955, Virginia Griggs of New York City donated a permanent trophy to an annual women's 5-persons intercity tournament, thus dubbing the tournament The Howe Cup. The tournament still runs to this day in memory of Howe and her daughters.
