= Gretchen Vosters Spruance =

American tennis and squash player (born 1947)

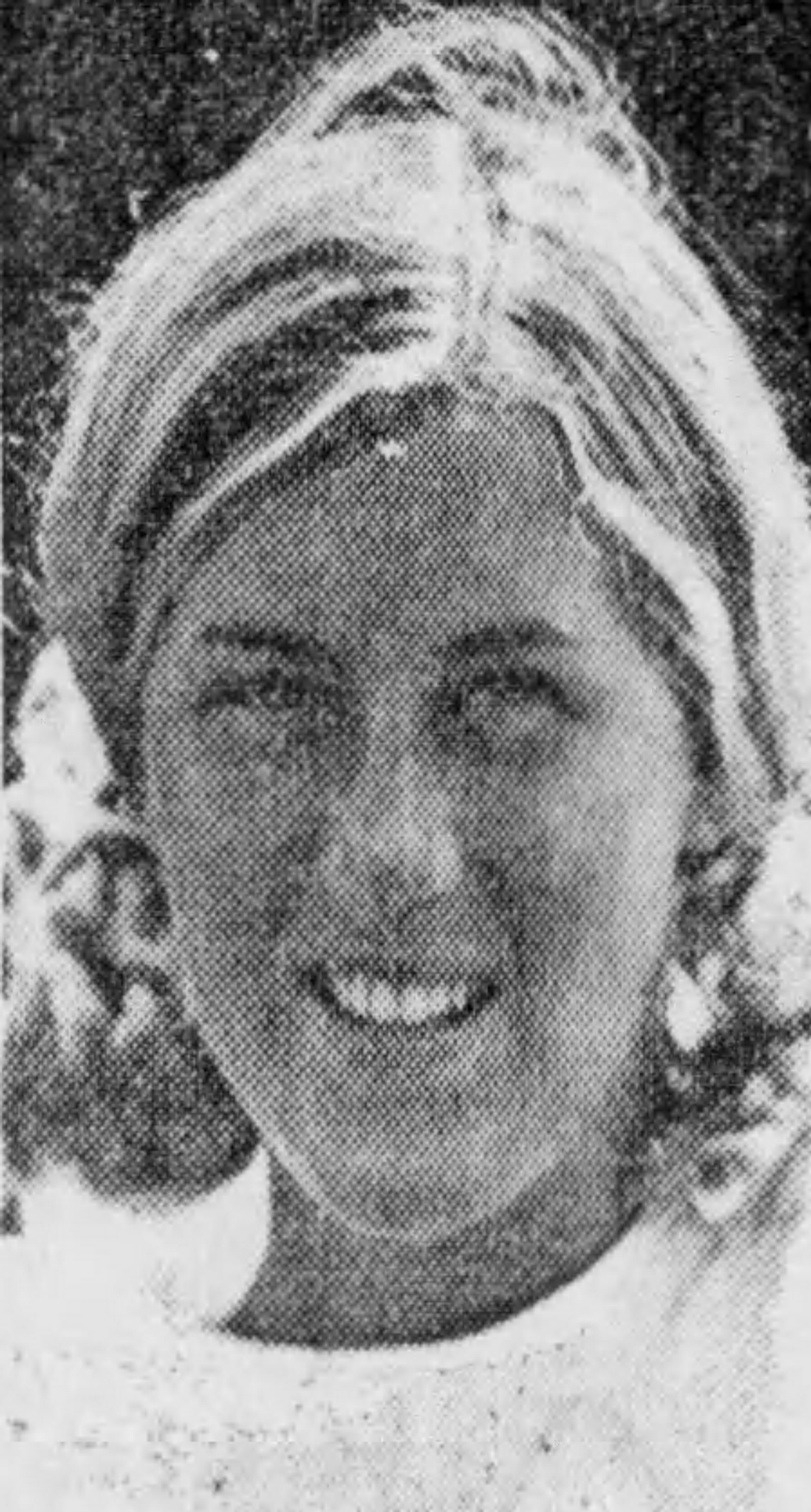
- Spruance c. 1974
- Country (sports): United States
- Born: 1947 (age 78–79)
- Height: 5 ft 11 in (180 cm)
- College: University of Delaware

Gretchen Vosters Spruance (born 1947) is an American former tennis and squash player. The daughter of Bunny Vosters, she won many national championships across both sports. Considered the best women's squash player in the country at her peak, she won a record 12 national squash titles in singles, doubles and mixed doubles play. Spruance was also a top tennis player, winning the Delaware state championship 20 consecutive years while also teaming with her mother to win a record 24 mother-daughter national titles. For a period of over 15 years, she and her mother won every match they played in mother-daughter competitions.

== Early life ==
Gretchen Vosters Spruance was born in 1947 to tennis player Bunny Vosters and her husband, the architect Francis Vosters. At age nine, she started regularly competing in tennis tournaments, winning age group competitions in both singles and doubles play. Spruance attended Wilmington Friends School where she competed in tennis, field hockey and basketball. From 1962 to 1965, she won the girls' singles title at the Delaware Interscholastic Tennis Championships each year, including by a score of 6–0, 6–0 in her senior year. In state and Middle States tournaments starting at the under-11 age group and through the 18-and-under age group, Spruance never lost a match. She attended and graduated from the University of Delaware.

== Career ==
At age 16, Spruance began competing in mother-daughter tournaments with her mother. Towards the end of the 1960s, she became the top-ranked singles tennis player in Delaware, and she also was ranked at times as part of the best doubles team in the state with her mother. At times, she was ranked the number one player in the Middle States as well. In 1967, Spruance won the women's singles title at the Delaware State Tennis Championship for the first time. She then remained dominant at the state tournament throughout the rest of her career, winning the title 20-straight years through 1986, in what The Morning News described as a streak that "may be the state's most impressive in any sport". In the later years of her career, she only competed at the Delaware tournament, wanting to spend more time with her family. The Morning News noted that "year after year, she made it all look so easy". Only three of her challengers ever won five games against her in the finals, while only one player ever won a set against Spruance during her 20-year reign at the state tournament. She retired from the state tournament in 1987, at the age of 40.

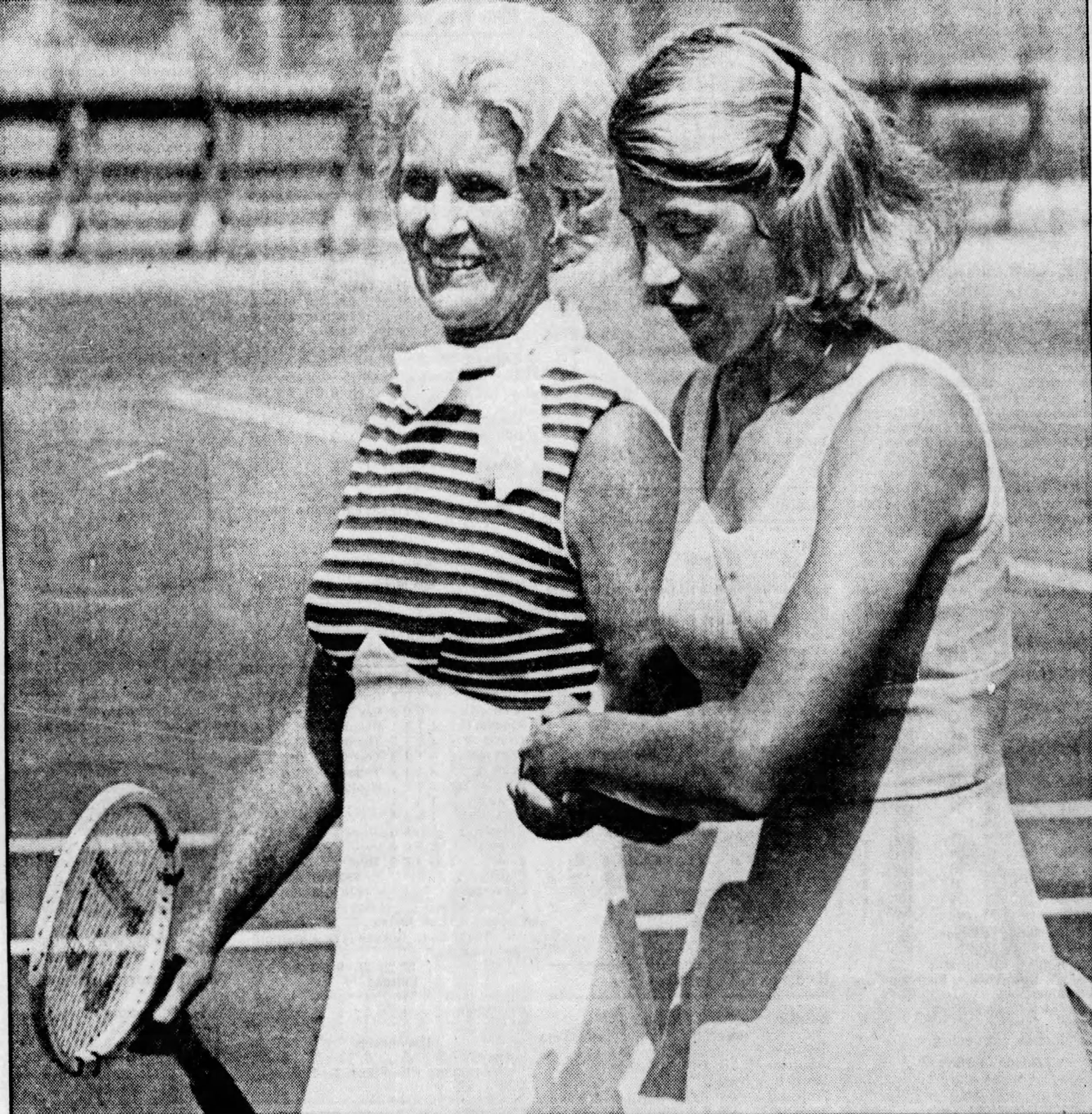
Spruance (right) and her mother in 1979

In tennis, Spruance frequently played in doubles matches alongside her mother, and the duo became the most dominant pair in the history of the national mother-daughter championships. Across the 1960s, 1970s and 1980s, the two won a total of 24 mother-daughter national titles together. This included titles on grass, clay, and hard courts, and in 1977 they won titles on all three. For a period of over 15 years, they had never lost in mother-daughter play, which Robert Robinson of The Pensacola News noted was "without a doubt ... the longest winning streak in modern-day history". Robinson stated, "Bunny Vosters and Gretchen Spruance experience a sudden speech impediment when it comes to pronouncing the word lose. They simply can't say the word. Rather than say lose, they prefer to use it." Bunny Vosters said, "Oh, we know what it is – that's why we try to stay away from it," and when asked about how many matches they had won during their winning streak, she said, "Oh God, you're asking the impossible". During her career, Spruance also won many regional competitions, including Middle States tournaments, some of which were in doubles with her mother.

Spruance also became regarded as one of the greatest competitors in women's squash history. James Zug described her as a "natural talent", noting that "she had only taken one squash lesson in her life". A member of the Wilmington Country Club, she was considered the top woman player of the 1970s. In 1970 and 1971, she won the national mixed doubles title with Kit Spahr, and then she won the national doubles title in 1972 with her mother while losing in the singles to her sister Nina Moyer. Following her defeat by her sister in the 1972 final, she began a streak in which she won the national title every time she competed. With her mother, she won national doubles titles in 1972, 1973, 1974, 1976 and 1977, while she was the national singles champion in 1973, 1974, 1976, 1977, and 1978. Her last title was decided by a single point. Zug noted, "Spruance, 'garbed in a pink and white checked pinafore with a pink ribbon holding back her blond tresses,' according to a USSRA reporter, jumped to a 15–10, 15–5 lead. In the third, she went up, 14–6, and some friends in the gallery headed to the bar to celebrate." However, her opponent and rival Barbara Maltby managed to win the third match by a score of 17–16 after nine match points, and then the fourth by a score of 15–8, "from a stunned Spruance, and the crowd reluctantly put down their drinks and filtered back from the bar." Zug stated, "In the fifth, Spruance got to thirteen first, but Maltby hung in and evened the score. Spruance chose set-five, and it inevitably went to 17-all. Both players hurtled up front in a mad scramble. Spruance asked for a let. With the tension unbearable, the referee said, a deux ex gallerie: 'Let point. Game and match, Spruance.'" Following her 1978 national title, Spruance retired from squash.

During her squash career, Spruance was regarded as the number one women's player, but was not included in the national rankings due to not playing enough tournaments, instead receiving the designation "insufficient data". She said, "And I was playing squash in the wintertime and that's what I got criticized for – I'd never play in enough tournaments to get a ranking and then I'd win the nationals, and they just hated that." She stated she did not want to play in the various tournaments in part due to wanting to be with her family. "Tennis and squash have given me so much – challenges, a sense of accomplishment. But that's not everything there is to life and too many people forget that. Someday it will all come to an end and then what do you have? A few trophies...a big zero?" she said.

James Zug described Spruance as "the last truly amateur woman national champion" in squash. In tournament programs, she was listed as having the occupation of "housewife".

=== Playing style ===
In squash, Spruance's serve was considered unorthodox, as she "dropped her racquet head and slapped at the ball, reminiscent, at least to one observer, of French tennis star Françoise Dürr's groundstrokes". Zug said of her: "At five foot eleven with a very contemporary look – frosted bouffant, rose lipstick and stylish coral-colored gingham pinafore outfits – Spruance had the nickname of the Pink Panther. She epitomized the traditional, well-heeled squash woman. She sewed her own squash dresses, cooked chocolate chip cookies to bring to tournaments and sold garden plants part-time ... Spruance talked incessantly on the court, had superb balance for a tall person and volleyed very well." Doug Gelbert, in The Great(er) Delaware Sports Book, stated that, regarding her tennis career, "Unlike many champions Gretchen Vosters Spruance was hardly obsessed – or impressed – by her accomplishments. She had two children during 'The Streak.' She virtually stopped playing all competitive singles and often had to be goaded into defending the state title by her husband and mother."

Spruance regularly practiced with her mother in both squash and tennis. She played at least one squash match a day during winters, commonly competing against men. Regarding the tennis doubles team of Spruance and Vosters, Robert Robinson said in The Pensacola News that, "Watching [them] on the court, one can see why they are the nation's top rated mother-daughter team. The two seem to compliment each other in every way and neither seems to lose her cool on the court. Spruance constantly talks to herself and occasionally grabs her neck as to indicate choking when she misses a shot – but Vosters is there to settle her down." Their strategy was to "try not to make errors, give encouragement to each other, and try to be steady". The Philadelphia Inquirer noted that, "They like to lob and work up to the net together. Patiently, they wait for an opening, and then attack."

== Personal life and honors ==
In 1971, she married William Halsey Spruance, a grandson of United States Navy officer William Halsey Jr. She had sons Jake and Corby during her career. Spruance continued playing squash several months into her pregnancies, including singles play through four months. Her step-daughter, Lea Spruance, also played squash.

The Vosters family was named the USTA Family of the Year in 1964, later again in 1988, and the Middle States Family of the Year in 1965. Spruance was inducted into the Delaware Sports Museum and Hall of Fame in 1989; her mother had been inducted in 1980, and they were the first mother-daughter pair to be inducted. She later was inducted into the Delaware Tennis Hall of Fame in 1996 and into the U.S. Squash Hall of Fame as part of the inaugural class in 2000.
