= Neil Sullivan (footballer, born 1903) =

English footballer

Personal information
- Full name: Cornelius Sullivan
- Date of birth: 6 June 1903
- Place of birth: Tynemouth, England
- Date of death: 1988 (aged 84–85)
- Position: Wing-half

Senior career*
Years	Team	Apps	(Gls)
1921–1922	Newburn Grange		
1922–1923	Preston North End	0	(0)
1923–1924	Swansea Town	0	(0)
1924–1925	Southend United	1	(0)
1925–1926	Newburn		
1926–1929	Hull City	65	(3)
1929–1930	Bradford (Park Avenue)	2	(0)
1930–1931	Carlisle United	10	(0)
1931	Wallsend		
Total		78	(3)
- * Club domestic league appearances and goals

Cornelius Sullivan (6 June 1903 – 1988) was an English footballer who played in the Football League for Bradford (Park Avenue), Carlisle United, Hull City and Southend United.
