= Peggy White =

Peggy Howe White (November 8, 1924 – 1997) was an American pioneer in women's squash.

She was born in Natick, Massachusetts to William Francis Howe and Margaret Howe, a squash pioneer and acclaimed founder of The Howe Cup. Her twin sister Betty Constable also went on to be a champion.

White won the national championship in 1952 and 1953.

Peggy married Robert White in the 1950s and together they had two sons and one daughter. They spent their married life in Rochester, NY until retirement in Nantucket, Massachusetts. She died in Lutherville, MD in 1997 and is buried in Nantucket.
