= Neil J. Sullivan =

American squash player

Personal information
- Nationality: American
- Born: Philadelphia, Pennsylvania
- Died: 1970

Sport
- Country: America
- Sport: Squash

Neil J. Sullivan (died June 12, 1970) was a multi-time US national champion in squash.

== Biography ==
Sullivan was born in Philadelphia and played for the Philadelphia Country Club. He was the 1928 US intercollegiate tennis champion. He competed for the Lockett Trophy in 1930. He won the US national squash men's singles championship in 1934. Sullivan was also the US men's national squash doubles champion from 1934 to 1940 with Roy R. Coffin.

Sullivan attended Lehigh University. Sullivan was the executive vice president of Annapolis Harbour House Inc. He later also served as the director of the Annapolis Clam Festival and the treasurer of the Maryland Hotel and Motor Inn Association.

Sullivan died on Friday, June 12, 1970. Sullivan was married to Gernelle Henderson. He had two sons and two step-sons.
