= James Zug =

American writer (born 1969)

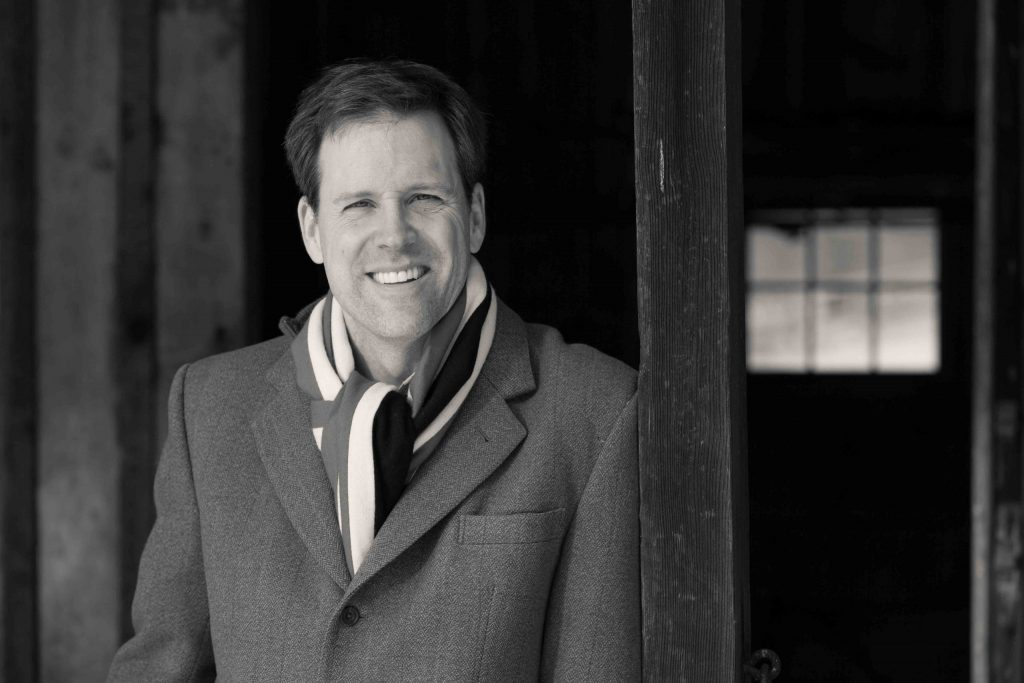

James Zug (born 1969) is an American writer. He is the author of six books.

His fiction has appeared in the anthology Stress City: A Big Book of Fiction By 51 DC Guys (Paycock Press, 2008) ISBN 978-0-931181-27-6. He also appeared in South Africa's Resistance Press: Alternative Voices in the Last Generation Under Apartheid (Ohio University, 2000) ISBN 978-0-89680-213-1.

== Early life and education ==
Zug was born in Philadelphia, Pennsylvania, in 1969. He studied at Dartmouth College, where he captained the squash team. He later earned a Master of Fine Arts in Nonfiction Writing from Columbia University.

== Career ==
Zug has written extensively on sports, culture, and history for publications including The New York Times, The Atlantic, Vanity Fair, Fast Company, Outside, The Boston Globe, The Daily Beast, and Tin House. He is a longtime senior writer for Squash Magazine and chairs the US Squash Hall of Fame Committee.

He is the author of several books, including Run to the Roar (2010), a history of the legendary squash program at Trinity College, for which Tom Wolfe contributed the foreword. Zug has been a frequent contributor to the Wall Street Journal and has written extensively for magazines and literary outlets. He also maintained a long-running blog for Vanity Fair.

His 2003 book, Squash: A History of the Game published by Scribner (Simon and Schuster, was the first comprehensive history of squash in the United States and featured a foreword by George Plimpton. It remains the best-selling squash book in the country. A revised and updated paperback edition was released in the fall of 2025, reflecting developments in the sport, including its inclusion in the Olympic Games.

Other works include American Traveler: The Life and Adventures of John Ledyard (2005) and Run to the Roar: Coaching to Overcome Fear (2010, with Paul Assaiante).

== Works ==
- Squash: A History of the Game. Scribner(Simon & Schuster). 2025-12-16. ISBN 978-1-6680-8971-2.
- The Preserve (privately printed, 2004)
- American Traveler: The Life & Adventures of John Ledyard (Basic Books, 2005) ISBN 978-0-465-09405-9
- The Last Voyage of Captain Cook: The Collected Writings of John Ledyard (editor; National Geographic Society) ISBN 978-0-7922-9347-7
- The Guardian: The History of South Africa's Extraordinary Anti-Apartheid Newspaper (Michigan State University Press and the University of South Africa Press, 2007) ISBN 978-0-87013-810-2
- The Long Conversation: 125 Years of Sidwell Friends School (privately printed, 2008) ISBN 978-0-615-17854-7
- Run to the Roar: Coaching to Overcome Fear (with Paul Assaiante; Penguin, 2010). ISBN 978-1-59184-364-1
