= Joyce Davenport =

American sportswoman

- Country (sports): United States
- Born: February 23, 1942 (age 83)

Singles

Grand Slam singles results
- US Open: 2R (1961, 1964, 1967)

Doubles

Grand Slam doubles results
- Wimbledon: 2R (1969)
- US Open: 2R (1964)

Joyce Davenport (born February 23, 1942) is an American sportswoman who played squash and tennis.

Davenport grew up in Philadelphia and earned nine varsity letters while competing in a variety of sports at Lower Merion High School. As a tennis player she made regular appearances at the U.S. Championships during the 1960s and featured in the doubles main draw of the 1969 Wimbledon Championships. She was a two-time national singles champion in squash (1965 & 1969) and is a member of the U.S. Squash Hall of Fame.
