= US Squash =

- Sport: Squash
- Abbreviation: USSRA
- Founded: 1904
- Regional affiliation: Federation of Panamerica
- Location: Philadelphia, Pennsylvania, U.S.
- President: Kevin Klipstein
- CEO: Kevin Klipstein
- Coach: Ong Beng Hee

Official website
- www.ussquash.com
- (United States)

US Squash is the national governing body for the sport of squash in the United States. Previously called The United States Squash Racquets Association, it is headquartered in Philadelphia and is a member of the U.S. Olympic Committee. US Squash owns and licenses the U.S. Open, the North American Open, and all other U.S. championships.

In 2017, the organization held twenty-one championship events for juniors, adults, hardball and doubles. The U.S. National High School Championships, held alternatingly in the Hartford, Connecticut, and Philadelphia areas, is the largest squash tournament in the world in terms of overall number of participants; in 2017, more than 170 teams comprising 1,400 players took part. The Men's National Championship (the S.L. Green) and the Women's National Championship are held every year at the National Singles. US Squash supports four national teams (Men's, Women's, Junior Men's and Junior Women's) that compete abroad in World Squash Federation and Pan American team tournaments. In 2017, the male U.S. Champion is Todd Harrity and the female U.S. Champion is Olivia Blatchford. As of 2017, the organization had 21,000 members.

== History ==
Founded in 1904 in Philadelphia, the United States Squash Racquets Association was the world's first squash organization. As the first association to define and regulate the sport, it set rules about play, the ball, and the court. In 1923, the growing organization began to hold an annual executive board meeting to discuss policies, by-laws and goals of the organization. In February 1924, an American Squash Racquets Singles Championship was held in Boston, Massachusetts, and was won on February 24 by Gerald Robarts of England, defeating William F. Harrity of Philadelphia in the final.

As the 1950s approached, the organization added positions to the board positions and hired full-time executives to run it; in addition, the organization opened two subdivisions to separate the players by starting both the Junior Nationals and the Senior Nationals.

In 1957, US Squash incorporated as a not-for-profit organization in the state of New York.

By the 1970s, US Squash had helped pioneer the female surge in athletics for America. The organization had started The United States Women’s Squash Racquets Association to define and regulate the game for women the same way that the United States Squash Racquets Association did for men. The USWSRA and the USSRA merged in 1979.

In 1975, when Darwin P. Kingsley became the first executive director of US Squash, there were 800 members and 40 clubs; when he left in 1992, there were 10,000 members and 250 clubs. Kingsley's successor was Craig Brand, who in his 10 years on the job helped bring the internationally popular soft ball game with the hard ball game that predominated in the United States, and helped the organization join the U.S. Olympic Committee. He was followed by Palmer Page, who brought 21st-century technology to the sport. Kevin Klipstein took over Page's position in 2004.

In 2000, the organization founded the U.S. Squash Hall of Fame to honor the most distinguished players in every aspect of the sport, including hardball, softball, singles, doubles, men and women, masters and juniors, amateurs and professionals. Induction into the Hall of Fame is considered the highest honor in the sport of squash. The Hall is resident in Yale University's Payne Whitney Gymnasium.

In 2006, the United States Squash Racquets Association renamed itself US Squash and moved its headquarters to New York City under the leadership of Jeanne McWilliams Blasberg, who was also its first female chairman of the board. In 2021, US Squash reestablished its headquarters in Philadelphia.

== Participation ==
=== Overall ===
As of 2017, the United States has the fastest growing squash participation worldwide, with 101% growth between 2009 and 2014 to 1.6 million squash players.

=== Junior ===
From 2007 to 2017, U.S. Junior participation grew more than fourfold. Since 2010, west coast junior tournaments have seen a 634% increase in junior tournament participation, 375% increase in the number of tournaments and a 55% increase in the average number of players per tournament. In the southeast, in 2010 there were no US Squash accredited junior tournaments. In the 2015 season there were more than eleven accredited tournaments in this area accounting for more than 500 accredited matches played. Since 2006, the U.S. Junior Open Squash Championships has increased from 271 to more than 1000 players in 2016 from more than thirty-seven countries, making it the largest individual junior squash tournament in the world.

=== Women ===
US Squash organizes Women's Squash Week to bring women players together around the world. Women’s participation has doubled since 2008, now playing more than 30,000 matches each year.

== See also ==
- United States Open (squash)
- US Pro Squash Series
- US Junior Open squash championship
- Men's National Champions (squash)
- Women's National Champions (squash)
- United States men's national squash team
- United States women's national squash team
