= US Junior Open squash championship =

US Junior Open

Details
- Event name: US Junior Open Squash Championship
- Location: Philadelphia, United States
- Venue: Arlen Specter US Squash Center
- Website www.ussquash.com/junior/tournaments/usjro/

Men's Winner
- Most recent champion(s): (Pakistan) Hamza Khan

Women's Winner
- Most recent champion(s): (England) Saran Nghiem
- Current: 2017 US Junior Open Squash Championships

The United States Junior Open Squash Championship is the largest individual junior squash tournament in the world and is considered the third most prestigious junior open squash championship after the World Junior and the British Junior Open squash championship. It is just one of just five Tier 2 events used in the WSF World Junior Squash Circuit.

The US Junior Open has shifted around locations in recent years due to efforts to secure the large amount of courts required to hold such a big tournament because multiple venues, usually four, host the tournament. It was held in Seattle in 2007, then Trinity College and surrounding schools in Hartford in 2008 and 2009, then Harvard University and surrounding schools in Boston from 2010 to 2012. Since then, every year it has been held primarily at Yale University in New Haven, Trinity College, and other schools in the Connecticut area. The coming tournament in 2018 will now be held at Harvard and the Boston area.

The 2014 US Junior Open squash championship hosted a record field of over 900 players representing over 20 countries.

The tournament is divided into ten categories — Boys Under-19, Boys Under-17, Boys Under-15, Boys Under-13, Boys Under-11, Girls Under-19, Girls Under-17, Girls Under-15, Girls Under-13, and Girls Under-11.

== List of winners by category (Boys) since 1999 ==
Year	Under-11	Under-13	Under-15	Under-17	Under-19
1999	tournament not created	(United States) Andrew Zimmerman	(Mexico) Mauricio Sanchez	(Mexico) Moises Galvez	(Colombia) Bernardo Samper
2000	tournament not created	(Pakistan) Adil Maqbool	(Canada) Robin Clarke	(Australia) Jhie Gough	(Mexico) Moises Galvez
2001	tournament not created	(Mexico) Antonio Glez	(Mexico) Arturo Salazar Martinez	(Mexico) Mauricio Sanchez	(South Africa) Anton de Jager
2002	tournament not created	(Canada) Kelly Shannon	(Mexico) Arturo Salazar Martinez	(Pakistan) Jahanzeb Khan	(United States) Julian Illingworth
2003	tournament not created	(Canada) Brian Hong	(Canada) David Letourneau	(Australia) Andrew Budd	(Colombia) Miguel Ángel Rodríguez
2004	tournament not created	(Canada) Nick Sachvie	(Canada) Kelly Shannon	(Canada) Colin West	(Colombia) Miguel Ángel Rodríguez
2005	tournament not created	(England) David Wardle	(Canada) Arjun Gupta	(Mexico) Antonio Glez	(Canada) Chris Sachvie
2006	tournament not created	(United States) Sam Conant	(Canada) Nick Sachvie	(United States) Todd Harrity	(Mexico) Arturo Salazar Martinez
2007	(United States) Max Martin	(United States) Dylan Murray	(England) David Wardle	(Mexico) Alfredo Ávila	(Egypt) Mohammed Ali Anwar Reda
2008	(United States) David Yacobucci	(Mexico) Juan C Gomez	(Egypt) Ahmed Latif	(Mexico) Miled Zarazua	(United States) Todd Harrity
2009	(United States) Ryan Murray	(Mexico) Guillermo Cortes	(Egypt) Seif Eleinen	(Egypt) Ahmed Abdelhalim	(Mexico) Miled Zarazua
2010	(Egypt) Aly Abou Eleinen	(Egypt) Mohamed El Shamy	(Peru) Diego Elías	(Egypt) Fady Sarwat	(Canada) Nick Sachvie
2011	(United States) Ayush Menon	(United States) Salim Khan	(Egypt) Mahmoud Yousry	(Egypt) Seif Abou El Einen	(Egypt) Ahmed Abdel Khalek
2012	(Egypt) Karim El Barbary	(Mexico) Leonel Cárdenas	(Mexico) Juan Camacho Mercado	(Peru) Diego Elías	(Egypt) Karim El Hammamy
2013	(United States) Rohan Iyer	(United States) Asser Ibrahim	(Egypt) Youssef Ibrahim	(Egypt) Karim Ibrahim	(Peru) Diego Elías
2014	(Egypt) Kareem El Torkey	(Egypt) Ali Yacout	(Egypt) Ahmed Elmashad	(Egypt) Youssef Ibrahim	(United States) Timothy Brownell
2015	(Egypt) Omar Ali Azzam	(England) Sam Todd	(Egypt) Aly Tolba	(United States) Sam Scherl	(Pakistan) Israr Ahmed
2016	(United States) Ahmad Haq	(India) Shreyas Mehta	(England) Sam Todd	(Mexico) Leonel Cárdenas	(United States) Andrew Douglas
2017	(Egypt) Adham Mabrouk	(Egypt) Islam Kouritam	(Ecuador) David Costales	(India) Yash Fadte	(Mexico) Leonel Cárdenas
2018	(United States) Jack Elriani	(India) Rohan Arya Gondi	(United States) Tad Carney	(England) Sam Todd	(Egypt) Aly Abou Eleinen
2019	(Egypt) Seif Belal El Shal	(Egypt) Youssef Salem	(Pakistan) Huzaifa Ibrahim	(Egypt) Aly El Khawas	(England) Sam Todd
2021	(United States) Youssef Zaky	(United States) Carlton Capella	(United States) Christian Capella	(Colombia) Juan José Torres	(Pakistan) Hamza Khan
2022	(United States) Reed Goulding	(United States) Carlton Capella	(United States) Christian Capella	(United States) Zane Patel	(United States) Avi Agarwal
2023	(United States) Graeson Smith	(United States) Carlton Capella	(United States) Jack Elriani	(United States) Alexander Dartnell	(United States) Rishi Srivastava
2024	(Pakistan) Muhammad Harmas Ali Raja	(Egypt) Malek Ahmed	(United States) John-Jayden Luo	(United States) Michael Fayez	(Egypt) Marwan Assal
2025	(United States) Azlan Khan	(United States) Teddy Edwards	(Canada) Obie Ryding	(United States) Brendan Tagliarini	(Malaysia) Nikhileswar Moganasundharem

=== Boys' champions by country since 1999 ===
Country	U-11	U-13	U-15	U-17	U-19	Total
United States	11	9	5	6	6	37
Egypt	6	5	6	6	5	28
Mexico	0	4	4	6	4	18
Canada	0	3	6	1	2	12
England	0	2	2	1	1	6
Pakistan	1	1	1	1	2	6
Colombia	0	0	0	1	3	4
Peru	0	0	1	1	1	3
India	0	2	0	1	0	3
Australia	0	0	0	2	0	2
Ecuador	0	0	1	0	0	1
Malaysia	0	0	0	0	1	1

== List of winners by category (Girls) since 1999 ==
Year	Under-11	Under-13	Under-15	Under-17	Under-19
1999	tournament not created	(Canada) Alisha Turner	(Canada) Jennifer Blumberg	(Canada) Jacqui Inward	(Malaysia) Leong Siu Lynn
2000	tournament not created	(United States) Maxi Prinsen	(United States) Lily Lorentzen	(United States) Lauren McCrery	(United States) Michelle Quibell
2001	tournament not created	(United States) Emily Park	(Canada) Alisha Turner	(Canada) Jennifer Blumberg	(Canada) Ruchika Kumar
2002	tournament not created	(United States) Emily Park	(Canada) Rebecca Dudley	(United States) Britt Hebden	(England) Emma Beddoes
2003	tournament not created	(Canada) Laura Gemmell	(United States) Emily Park	(Canada) Neha Kumar	(United States) Lily Lorentzen
2004	tournament not created	(United States) Olivia Blatchford	(United States) Emily Park	(United States) Kristen Lange	(England) Jenna Gates
2005	tournament not created	(United States) Skyler Bouchard	(Canada) Laura Gemmell	(United States) Emily Park	(Canada) Neha Kumar
2006	tournament not created	(United States) Amy Smedira	(United States) Vidya Rajan	(Canada) Laura Gemmell	(United States) Kristen Lange
2007	(United States) Reeham Sedky	(United States) Claudia Regio	(United States) Amanda Sobhy	(Egypt) Salma Nassar	(Canada) Laura Gemmell
2008	(United States) Helen Teegan	(United States) Reeham Sedky	(United States) Maria Elena Ubina	(United States) Amanda Sobhy	(Canada) Laura Gemmell
2009	(Netherlands) Elena Wagenmans	(United States) Reeham Sedky	(United States) Olivia Fiechter	(United States) Maria Elena Ubina	(United States) Olivia Blatchford
2010	(Netherlands) Elena Wagenmans	(United States) Helen Teegan	(United States) Reeham Sedky	(United States) Olivia Fiechter	(United States) Amanda Sobhy
2011	(Egypt) Jamila Abul Enin	(Egypt) Malak Fayed	(United States) Reeham Sedky	(Malaysia) Sue Ann Yong	(United States) Maria Elena Ubina
2012	(Egypt) Farida Mohamed	(Egypt) Farida Saber	(United States) Helen Teegan	(Egypt) Laila Omar	(United States) Sabrina Sobhy
2013	(Egypt) Sana Mohamed	(Egypt) Nouran Youssef	(Japan) Satomi Wanatabe	(Canada) Chloe Chemtob	(United States) Sabrina Sobhy
2014	(Egypt) Menna Walid Hedia	(United States) Marina Stefanoni	(Egypt) Nada Abbas	(Japan) Satomi Wanatabe	(United States) Reeham Sedky
2015	(Egypt) Lojayn Gohary	(Egypt) Jana Safy	(United States) Marina Stefanoni	(United States) Gracie Doyle	(Japan) Satomi Watanabe
2016	(United States) Madison Ho	(Egypt) Haya Ali	(United States) Marina Stefanoni	(Egypt) Jana Shiha	(Japan) Satomi Watanabe
2017	(Spain) Ona Blasco	(United States) Caroline Fouts	(United States) Serena Daniel	(Barbados) Meagan Best	(United States) Marina Stefanoni
2018	(Egypt) Maya Mandour	(Egypt) Shahd Shahen	(Egypt) Nourin Khalifa	(Egypt) Nouran Youssef	(United States) Marina Stefanoni
2019	(Egypt) Maya Mandour	(Egypt) Amina Orfi	(Egypt) Fayrouz Aboelkheir	(Malaysia) Heng Wai Wong	(United States) Marina Stefanoni
2021	(United States) Vivienne Sze	(United States) Charlotte Sze	(United States) Dixon Hill	(United States) Riya Navani	(United States) Marina Stefanoni
2022	(United States) Vivienne Sze	(United States) Charlotte Sze	(United States) Dixon Hill	(United States) Riya Navani	(United States) Caroline Fouts
2023	(United States) Kaylee Li	(United States) Vivienne Sze	(United States) Charlotte Sze	(Egypt) Ruqayyaa Salem	(United States) Caroline Fouts
2024	(United States) Alice Wang	(Pakistan) Mahnoor Ali	(United States) Isabella Tang	(Egypt) Ruqayyaa Salem	(Egypt) Barb Sameh
2025	(Canada) Eugenie Cao	(United States) Kaylee Li	(United States) Vivienne Sze	(United States) Reghan McLaughlin	(Egypt) Talia Zakaria

=== Girls' champions by country since 1999 ===
Country	U-11	U-13	U-15	U-17	U-19	Total
United States	7	16	18	11	15	67
Egypt	7	7	3	6	2	25
Canada	1	2	4	5	4	16
Japan	0	0	1	1	2	4
Malaysia	0	0	0	2	1	3
England	0	0	0	0	2	2
Netherlands	2	0	0	0	0	2
Barbados	0	0	0	1	0	1
Spain	1	0	0	0	0	1
Pakistan	0	1	0	0	0	1

== See also ==
- US Open
- World Junior Squash Circuit
- World Junior Squash Championships
- British Junior Open Squash
- French Junior Open Squash
- Dutch Junior Open Squash
- U.S. Squash
