= 2017 US Junior Open Squash Championships =

US Junior Open
- US Junior Open squash championships
- Location: (United States) New Haven, Connecticut
- Venue: Yale University, Trinity College, Wesleyan University, Loomis Chaffee School
- Date: December 16 – 19, 2017
- Website https://modules.ussquash.com/ssm/pages/tournaments/information.asp?tournament_id=8858#RecentNews/

Results
- Champion: (Mexico) Leonel Cárdenas
- Runner-up: (India) Adhitya Raghavan
- Semi-finalists: (Egypt) Aly Hussein / (Egypt) Aly Abou El Einen

The 2017 Men's US Junior Squash Championships is the men's edition of the 2017 US Junior Open squash championship, which is a World Junior Squash Circuit Tier 2 event. The event primarily took place at the Payne Whitney Gymnasium at Yale University in New Haven, Connecticut from December 16 to 19. Mexico's Leonel Cárdenas won his third US Junior Open title, defeating Adhitya Raghavan of India in the Boys' Under 19 final. India's Yash Fadte won his first US Junior Open title, defeating Ayush Menon of the United States in the Boys' Under 17 final.

== Seeds (Boys' Under 19) ==
1. [1*] (Mexico) Leonel Cárdenas (champion)
2. [2*] (India) Adhitya Raghavan (final)
3. [3*] (Egypt) Aly Hussein (semifinals)
4. [4*] (Colombia) Ronald Palomino (round of 16)
5. [5*] (Egypt) Aly Abou Eleinen (semifinals)
6. [6*] (United States) Cole Becker (round of 16)
7. [7*] (United States) Charles Culhane (quarterfinals)
8. [8*] (Kuwait) Mohammad Al-Terki (third round)
9. [9/12*] (India) Yash Bhargava (third round)
10. [9/12*] (United States) Eric Kim (round of 16)
11. [9/12*] (Colombia) Matias Knudsen (quarterfinals)
12. [9/12*] (Canada) George Crowne (second round)
13. [13/16*] (Belgium) Sanjay Jeeva (third round)
14. [13/16*] (Australia) William Curtis (round of 16)
15. [13/16*] (New Zealand) Finn Trimble (third round)
16. [13/16*] (United States) Tiber Worth (third round)

== Draw and results ==
=== Finals ===
Quarterfinals
1	(Mexico) Leonel Cárdenas	11	8	11	11
17/24	(United States) William Ezratty	3	11	7	5
5	(Egypt) Aly Abou Eleinen	12	11	11
17/24	(Guatemala) Alejandro Enríquez	10	6	4
3	(Egypt) Aly Hussein	7	11	4	11	11
9/12	(Colombia) Matías Knudsen	11	3	11	6	8
7	(United States) Charles Culhane	4	9	2
2	(India) Adhitya Raghavan	11	11	11

Semifinals
1	(Mexico) Leonel Cárdenas	4	11	11	11
5	(Egypt) Aly Abou Eleinen	11	7	5	7
3	(Egypt) Aly Hussein	11	12	8	11
2	(India) Adhitya Raghavan	13	10	11	13

Final
1	(Mexico) Leonel Cárdenas	13	11	11
2	(India) Adhitya Raghavan	11	2	5

=== Top half ===
==== Section 1 ====
First round
1	(Mexico) Leonel Cárdenas	11	11	11
(United States) Cyrus Illick	1	4	3
(United States) Michael Mulholland	4	11	11	12
(India) Loveneet Ahluwalia	11	9	7	10
(Netherlands) Frank Goossens	11	11	11
(Chile) José Tomas Gallegos	8	6	8
(United States) Charlie Preusse	4	8	3
25/32	(United States) Aditya Kankariya	11	11	11
17/24	(Brazil) Pedro Facury Gomes	11	11	11
(United States) James Justicz	1	1	1
(Canada) Michael Greenwood	6	5	7
(Australia) Nicholas Calvert	11	11	11
(Egypt) Seif Hemdan	11	10	11	5
(Ecuador) Nicolas Tinajero Rosero	13	12	7	11
(Pakistan) Ijaz Mehmund	wo
13/16	(United States) Tiber Worth
9/12	(India) Yash Bhargava	11	11	11
(Guyana) Rithew Saywack	2	4	5
(United States) Lucan White	8	7	11	6
(Canada) William Kuhn	11	11	3	11
(United States) David Rubin	11	11	12
(Colombia) Luis Mancilla	5	8	10
(Jamaica) Adam Ardito	4	1	3
17/24	(United States) William Ezratty	11	11	11
25/32	(Canada) Liam Marrison	11	11	11
(United States) Henry Somerby	1	9	9
(United States) Teddy Durfee	4	4	8
(Argentina) Miguel Pujol	11	11	11
(United States) Theodore Best	11	11	11
(United States) Charlie Sutherby	8	7	7
(Mexico) Carlos Ramón Martinez Tomás	7	9	7
8	(Kuwait) Mohammad Al-Terki	11	11	11

Second round
1	(Mexico) Leonel Cárdenas	11	11	11
(United States) Michael Mulholland	3	5	1
(Netherlands) Frank Goossens	7	11	11	3
25/32	(United States) Aditya Kankariya	11	4	13	11
17/24	(Brazil) Pedro Facury Gomes	9	3	11	11	3
(Australia) Nicholas Calvert	11	11	4	5	11
(Ecuador) Nicolas Tinajero Rosero	1	3	6
13/16	(United States) Tiber Worth	11	11	11
9/12	(India) Yash Bhargava	11	11	8	11
(Canada) William Kuhn	8	8	11	9
(United States) David Rubin	4	11	7	8
17/24	(United States) William Ezratty	11	9	11	11
25/32	(Canada) Liam Marrison	8	11	9	11	11
(Argentina) Miguel Pujol	11	8	11	8	4
(United States) Theodore Best	10	4	11	5
8	(Kuwait) Mohammad Al-Terki	12	11	8	11

Third round
1	(Mexico) Leonel Cárdenas	11	11	11
25/32	(United States) Aditya Kankariya	5	4	5
(Australia) Nicholas Calvert	7	11	11	11
13/16	(United States) Tiber Worth	11	9	6	6
9/12	(India) Yash Bhargava	8	11	6	8
17/24	(United States) William Ezratty	11	5	11	11
25/32	(Canada) Liam Marrison	6	11	11	14
8	(Kuwait) Mohammad Al-Terki	11	3	6	12

Round of 16
1	(Mexico) Leonel Cárdenas	11	11	11
(Australia) Nicholas Calvert	4	7	4
Quarterfinals
1	(Mexico) Leonel Cárdenas	11	8	11	11
17/24	(United States) William Ezratty	3	11	7	5
17/24	(United States) William Ezratty	14	4	11	11
25/32	(Canada) Liam Marrison	12	11	9	7

==== Section 2 ====
First round
5	(Egypt) Aly Abou Eleinen	11	11	14
(United States) Deven Kanwal	6	6	12
(United States) Giovanni Matarazzo	4	5	4
(United States) Robinson Armour	11	11	11
(Canada) Elliott Hunt	11	11	11
(India) Raunak Advani	2	5	7
(United States) Michael Berry	5	11	4	11	5
25/32	(Kenya) Muqtadir Nimji	11	9	11	9	11
17/24	(Colombia) Iñaki De Laraurri	11	11	9	8	11
(Australia) Joel Arscott	5	6	11	11	7
(Pakistan) Muhammad Samiullah	wo
(United States) Keith Lamp
(Canada) Justin Ghaeli	4	11	8	12	11
(Malaysia) Sanjeev Jeyabalan	11	8	11	10	6
(United States) Franki Velazquez	6	5	7
9/12	(Canada) George Crowne	11	11	11
13/16	(Belgium) Sanjay Jeeva	11	11	11
(Ecuador) Julio Yaselga	3	2	4
(Canada) Charles de la Riva	3	3	3
(United States) Ian Blatchford	11	11	11
(Argentina) Jeremías Azaña	8	11	11	11
(United States) Brian Cowhey	11	8	2	0
(Mexico) Roberto Barba	1	7	5
17/24	(Guatemala) Alejandro Enríquez	11	11	11
25/32	(Peru) Rafael Galvez	11	11	11
(United States) Zach Bradlow	8	2	3
(Chile) Agustín Carranza	7	4	7
(Egypt) Mohamed El Boraie	11	11	11
(United States) Charlie East	11	11	11
(United States) K. Marco Rodriguez	5	4	9
(United States) Rohil Bathija	1	3	5
4	(Colombia) Ronald Palomino	11	11	11

Second round
5	(Egypt) Aly Abou Eleinen	11	7	11	11
(United States) Robinson Armour	1	11	7	2
(Canada) Elliott Hunt	11	11	11
25/32	(Kenya) Muqtadir Nimji	6	6	3
17/24	(Colombia) Iñaki De Laraurri	11	11	11
(United States) Keith Lamp	8	9	7
(Canada) Justin Ghaeli	11	14	11	8	11
9/12	(Canada) George Crowne	13	12	7	11	9
13/16	(Belgium) Sanjay Jeeva	12	11	11
(United States) Ian Blatchford	10	8	8
(Argentina) Jeremías Azaña	8	11	11	4	8
17/24	(Guatemala) Alejandro Enríquez	11	9	9	11	11
25/32	(Peru) Rafael Galvez	7	7	8	11	12
(Egypt) Mohamed El Boraie	11	11	8	14
(United States) Charlie East	0	4	9
4	(Colombia) Ronald Palomino	11	11	11

Third round
5	(Egypt) Aly Abou Eleinen	12	8	11	12	11
(Canada) Elliott Hunt	10	11	4	14	1
17/24	(Colombia) Iñaki De Laraurri	12	11	15	8	9
(Canada) Justin Ghaeli	14	8	13	11	11
13/16	(Belgium) Sanjay Jeeva	11	3	7	11	7
17/24	(Guatemala) Alejandro Enríquez	2	11	11	5	11
(Egypt) Mohamed El Boraie	4	7	6
4	(Colombia) Ronald Palomino	11	11	11

Round of 16
5	(Egypt) Aly Abou Eleinen	11	11	11
(Canada) Justin Ghaeli	4	5	6
Quarterfinals
5	(Egypt) Aly Abou Eleinen	12	11	11
17/24	(Guatemala) Alejandro Enríquez	10	6	4
17/24	(Guatemala) Alejandro Enríquez	11	11	4	9	11
4	(Colombia) Ronald Palomino	4	6	11	11	8

=== Bottom half ===
==== Section 1 ====
First round
3	(Egypt) Aly Hussein	11	11	11
(United States) Alexander Schwartz	4	7	1
(Canada) Tommy Scott	6	4	10
(India) Chaitanya Shah	11	11	12
(United States) Tucker Martino	11	11	11
(Argentina) Dylan Tymkiw	9	8	4
(United States) Isaiah Miller	5	5	2
25/32	(New Zealand) Lwamba Chileshe	11	11	11
17/24	(United States) Max Finkelstein	11	11	11
(United States) Joe Kacergis	0	1	4
(United States) Sebastian De La Vega	6	5	0
(England) Josh Owen	11	11	11
(Republic of Ireland) Ryan Kelly	11	7	11	11
(United States) Dennis Polyakov	8	11	8	5
(Jamaica) Jonathan Walker	6	7	8
13/16	(Australia) William Curtis	11	11	11
9/12	(Colombia) Matías Knudsen	11	11	11
(United States) Nicholas Parente	5	2	3
(Ecuador) Juan José Moya	2	8	11	12
(United States) Cullen Little	11	11	7	14
(Canada) Dominic Wren	11	11	11
(Guatemala) Fernando Cordero	5	3	1
(United States) Sam Haliulin	1	2	5
17/24	(India) Rutvik Rau	11	11	11
25/32	(Egypt) Aly Fathallah	11	11	4	11
(United States) Alexander Trauber	7	9	11	6
(Mexico) Axel Maldonado	11	11	11
(United States) Patrick Feeley	7	6	4
(New Zealand) Anthony Lepper	11	11	11
(United States) Ishaan Patel	8	4	8
(Mexico) Alejandro Juárez	5	3	8
6	(United States) Cole Becker	11	11	11

Second round
3	(Egypt) Aly Hussein	11	11	11
(India) Chaitanya Shah	6	5	4
(United States) Tucker Martino	11	11	5	10	5
25/32	(New Zealand) Lwamba Chileshe	5	9	11	12	11
17/24	(United States) Max Finkelstein	11	11	3	14
(England) Josh Owen	5	9	11	12
(Republic of Ireland) Ryan Kelly	7	0	4
13/16	(Australia) William Curtis	11	11	11
9/12	(Colombia) Matías Knudsen	11	11	11
(United States) Cullen Little	4	1	2
(Canada) Dominic Wren	9	7	8
17/24	(India) Rutvik Rau	11	11	11
25/32	(Egypt) Aly Fathallah	4	15	6
(Mexico) Axel Maldonado	11	17	11
(New Zealand) Anthony Lepper	10	5	11	6
6	(United States) Cole Becker	12	11	7	11

Third round
3	(Egypt) Aly Hussein	11	11	8	11
25/32	(New Zealand) Lwamba Chileshe	7	1	11	5
17/24	(United States) Max Finkelstein	6	7	7
13/16	(Australia) William Curtis	11	11	11
9/12	(Colombia) Matías Knudsen	11	11	11
17/24	(India) Rutvik Rau	2	6	3
(Mexico) Axel Maldonado	7	2	2
6	(United States) Cole Becker	11	11	11

Round of 16
3	(Egypt) Aly Hussein	11	11	11
13/16	(Australia) William Curtis	2	6	8
Quarterfinals
3	(Egypt) Aly Hussein	7	11	4	11	11
9/12	(Colombia) Matías Knudsen	11	3	11	6	8
9/12	(Colombia) Matías Knudsen	11	9	10	11	17
6	(United States) Cole Becker	4	11	12	9	15

==== Section 2 ====
First round
7	(United States) Charles Culhane	11	11	11
(Mexico) Carlos Rodriguez	6	2	2
(Canada) Liam Leidekker	2	9	8
(Colombia) Martín Ríos	11	11	11
(Australia) Maaz Khatri	11	11	11
(United States) Kion Bruno	1	2	2
(United States) William Langdon	2	0	3
25/32	(United States) William Holey	11	11	11
17/24	(United States) Aman Sanger	11	11	11
(United States) Will Jones	4	2	0
(Canada) Alex Spafford	11	7	8	7
(South Africa) Glenn Yates	7	11	11	11
(Jordan) Abdelkader Jeitan	11	11	12
(United States) Ben Korn	6	6	10
(Brazil) Vinicius Muniz	6	8	3
9/12	(United States) Eric Kim	11	11	11
13/16	(New Zealand) Finn Trimble	11	11	11
(Mexico) Ernesto Barba	6	8	1
(Colombia) David Varela	8	11	5	11	11
(United States) Christian Loop	11	4	11	6	5
(Chile) Matías Lacroix	11	11	11
(Jamaica) Tahjia Lumley	4	0	5
(United States) John Sutherby	4	1	3
17/24	(Canada) James Flynn	11	11	11
25/32	(Ecuador) Álvaro Buenaño	15	11	11
(United States) Quinton Crawford	13	2	3
(United States) Teddy Eill	8	13	13	6	8
(Egypt) Ziad Salem	11	11	11	11	11
(United States) Alex Dworetzky	11	5	8	11	11
(United States) Isaiah Goldberg	8	11	11	6	5
(Canada) Emilio Carillo	4	4	12
2	(India) Adhitya Raghavan	11	11	14

Second round
7	(United States) Charles Culhane	11	11	11
(Colombia) Martín Ríos	6	6	5
(Australia) Maaz Khatri	9	8	9
25/32	(United States) William Holey	11	11	11
17/24	(United States) Aman Sanger	11	10	11	14
(South Africa) Glenn Yates	9	12	8	12
(Jordan) Abdelkader Jeitan	6	11	6	9
9/12	(United States) Eric Kim	11	8	11	11
13/16	(New Zealand) Finn Trimble	11	11	11
(Colombia) David Varela	6	9	5
(Chile) Matías Lacroix	13	6	11	8	2
17/24	(Canada) James Flynn	11	11	8	11	11
25/32	(Ecuador) Álvaro Buenaño	12	13	11	9	11
(Egypt) Ziad Salem	10	15	5	11	6
(United States) Alex Dworetzky	8	11	7
2	(India) Adhitya Raghavan	11	13	11

Third round
7	(United States) Charles Culhane	11	11	11
25/32	(United States) William Holey	9	8	5
17/24	(United States) Aman Sanger	11	11	3	2	3
9/12	(United States) Eric Kim	5	9	11	11	11
13/16	(New Zealand) Finn Trimble	6	8	3
17/24	(Canada) James Flynn	11	11	11
25/32	(Ecuador) Álvaro Buenaño	12	8	4
2	(India) Adhitya Raghavan	14	11	11

Round of 16
7	(United States) Charles Culhane	11	11	11
9/12	(United States) Eric Kim	5	4	8
Quarterfinals
7	(United States) Charles Culhane	4	9	2
2	(India) Adhitya Raghavan	11	11	11
17/24	(Canada) James Flynn	7	8	11	7
2	(India) Adhitya Raghavan	11	11	7	11

== Seeds (Boys' Under 17) ==
1. [1*] (England) Lewis Anderson (quarterfinals)
2. [2*] (United States) Ayush Menon (final)
3. [3*] (Egypt) Aly Tolba (quarterfinals)
4. [4*] (Egypt) Ismael Atef (round of 16)
5. [5*] (United States) Maxwell Velazquez (round of 16)
6. [6*] (United States) Dillon Huang (round of 16)
7. [7*] (Malaysia) Danial Nurhaqiem Sharul Izam (quarterfinals)
8. [8*] (India) Yash Fadte (champion)
9. [9/12*] (Egypt) Mohamed Sharaf (round of 16)
10. [9/12*] (United States) Thomas Rosini (round of 16)
11. [9/12*] (India) Utkarsh Baheti (semifinals)
12. [9/12*] (Canada) Asser Ibrahim (quarterfinals)
13. [13/16*] (Canada) Abdelrahman Dweek (semifinals)
14. [13/16*] (Egypt) Mazen Dessouky (third round)
15. [13/16*] (Egypt) Karim Thabet (round of 16)
16. [13/16*] (Mexico) Juan Carlos Vargas (round of 16)

== Draw and results ==
=== Finals ===
Quarterfinals
1	(England) Lewis Anderson	13	3	11	5	6
8	(India) Yash Fadte	11	11	5	11	11
9/12	(Canada) Asser Ibrahim	8	12	9	15	8
13/16	(Canada) Abdelrahman Dweek	11	10	11	13	11
3	(Egypt) Aly Tolba	11	11	9	11	7
9/12	(India) Utkarsh Baheti	13	5	11	9	11
7	(Malaysia) Danial Nurhaqiem Sharul Izham	9	7	12	12
2	(United States) Ayush Menon	11	11	10	14

Semifinals
8	(India) Yash Fadte	6	6	11	11	11
13/16	(Canada) Abdelrahman Dweek	11	11	4	5	9
9/12	(India) Utkarsh Baheti	8	8	4
2	(United States) Ayush Menon	11	11	11

Final
8	(India) Yash Fadte	11	1	11	11
2	(United States) Ayush Menon	8	11	6	8

=== Top half ===
==== Section 1 ====
First round
1	(England) Lewis Anderson	11	11	11
(United States) Nick Wilkinson	5	9	6
(United States) Joey Raskin Lantos	wo
(Jordan) Abdelrahman Mohamed Alsarraj
(Canada) Mitchell Kahnert	11	11	11
(Egypt) Allaeldin Abdel Khalek	3	2	7
(Mexico) Sebastian Ramos	4	6	4
25/32	(India) Gautam Nagpal	11	11	11
17/24	(United States) Dana Santry	11	11	11
(Guatemala) Julian Sandoval	4	6	6
(New Zealand) Kobe Fleming	0	0	0
(Canada) John Dempsey	11	11	11
(Colombia) Flavio Hinostroza	15	11	11
(United States) MD Jawad	13	1	7
(United States) Charles Mattson	5	4	3
13/16	(Mexico) Juan Carlos Vargas	11	11	11
9/12	(Egypt) Mohamed Sharaf	11	11	11
(Canada) Daniel Malek	5	5	4
(South Africa) Charlie Yates	5	14	3
(Canada) Nikhil Ismail	11	16	11
(United States) Tate Suratt	11	11	11
(Colombia) Marcos Andres Rodriguez Contreras	1	2	1
(United States) Daniyal Athar	11	10	9	5
17/24	(Mexico) Luis E. M. Gonzalez	8	12	11	11
25/32	(United States) Maxwell Orr	11	11	11
(Egypt) Hussein Eldesouky	2	2	7
(United States) Conner Stoltz	9	10	12
(Colombia) Nicolas Serna	11	12	14
(United States) Harry Charlton	11	11	11
(Peru) Nicolas Santander	8	2	4
(Canada) Rhys Langdon	6	1	4
8	(India) Yash Fadte	11	11	11

Second round
1	(England) Lewis Anderson	11	11	11
(United States) Joey Raskin Lantos	8	6	6
(Canada) Mitchell Kahnert	6	11	7	6
25/32	(India) Gautam Nagpal	11	2	11	11
17/24	(United States) Dana Santry	11	7	11	13
(Canada) John Dempsey	2	11	7	11
(Colombia) Flavio Hinostraza	11	3	4	11	6
13/16	(Mexico) Juan Carlos Vargas	9	11	11	7	11
9/12	(Egypt) Mohamed Sharaf	11	12	11
(Canada) Nikhil Ismail	7	10	8
(United States) Tate Suratt	6	4	8
17/24	(Mexico) Luis E. M. Gonzalez	11	11	11
25/32	(United States) Maxwell Orr	11	9	9	11	11
(Colombia) Nicolas Serna	3	11	11	6	4
(United States) Harry Charlton	2	8	4
8	(India) Yash Fadte	11	11	11

Third round
1	(England) Lewis Anderson	11	11	11
25/32	(India) Gautam Nagpal	4	4	7
17/24	(United States) Dana Santry	2	13	11	4
13/16	(Mexico) Juan Carlos Vargas	11	15	7	11
9/12	(Egypt) Mohamed Sharaf	9	11	11	6	11
17/24	(Mexico) Luis E. M. Gonzalez	11	9	3	11	7
25/32	(United States) Maxwell Orr	6	5	8
8	(India) Yash Fadte	11	11	11

Round of 16
1	(England) Lewis Anderson	11	11	11
13/16	(Mexico) Juan Carlos Vargas	8	8	8
Quarterfinals
1	(England) Lewis Anderson	13	3	11	5	6
8	(India) Yash Fadte	11	11	5	11	11
9/12	(Egypt) Mohamed Sharaf	8	11	5
8	(India) Yash Fadte	11	13	11

==== Section 2 ====
First round
5	(United States) Maxwell Velazquez	11	11	12
(Guatemala) Adrian Castillo	7	2	2
(Canada) Aaron Nagy	6	8	7
(United States) Hugh Camiener	11	11	11
(Mexico) Israel Oliveros	11	11	11
(Egypt) Mohamed Morsy	9	4	6
(Guatemala) Juan Cruz-Gomar	4	3	6
25/32	(United States) Chris Zachary	11	11	11
17/24	(Barbados) Khamal Cumberbatch	11	11	11
(Colombia) Antonio Andres Ulloa	2	4	8
(Canada) Kiyan Dhanani	5	4	7
(Australia) Saad Khatri	11	11	11
(Egypt) Mohamed Elkhawas	11	11	11
(Colombia) Edwin Jaramillo	2	2	3
(United States) Julian Wambach	4	5	3
9/12	(Canada) Asser Ibrahim	11	11	11
13/16	(Canada) Abdelrahman Dweek	11	11	11
(United States) Tom Hogan	4	1	7
(Scotland) Daniel O'Sullivan	11	5	3	5
(Peru) Martin Leon	4	11	11	11
(Canada) Matt Bicknell	11	11	11
(United States) William (Mac) Aube	6	9	8
(Switzerland) Marco Durarte	2	1	2
17/24	(United States) Alastair Cho	11	11	11
25/32	(Egypt) Taha Dinana	11	12	11
(United States) Frederick Cisse	6	10	4
(Mexico) Rodrigo Reyes	wo
(Argentina) Juan Ignacio Pelizzari
(Colombia) Daniel De Leon	11	11	11
(Canada) Ismael Matti-Alvarez	7	6	6
(United States) Taylor Clayton	4	4	8
4	(Egypt) Ismael Atef	11	11	11

Second round
5	(United States) Maxwell Velazquez	11	11	11
(United States) Hugh Camiener	4	7	8
(Mexico) Israel Oliveros	6	13	10
25/32	(United States) Chris Zachary	11	15	12
17/24	(Barbados) Khamal Cumberbatch	11	11	5	11
(Australia) Saad Khatri	3	6	11	7
(Egypt) Mohamed Elkhawas	6	3	9
9/12	(Canada) Asser Ibrahim	11	11	11
13/16	(Canada) Abdelrahman Dweek	11	11	11
(Peru) Martin Leon	5	8	7
(Canada) Matt Bicknell	10	10	10
17/24	(United States) Alastair Cho	12	12	12
25/32	(Egypt) Taha Dinana	12	11	11
(Argentina) Juan Ignacio Pelizzari	10	7	2	'
(Colombia) Daniel De Leon	8	8	11	8
4	(Egypt) Isamel Atef	11	11	9	11

Third round
5	(United States) Maxwell Velazquez	11	11	11
25/32	(United States) Chris Zachary	7	3	6
17/24	(Barbados) Khamal Cumberbatch	6	4	8
9/12	(Canada) Asser Ibrahim	11	11	11
13/16	(Canada) Abdelrahman Dweek	11	11	13
17/24	(United States) Alastair Cho	8	8	11
25/32	(Egypt) Taha Dinana	9	3	11	9
4	(Egypt) Ismael Atef	11	11	8	11

Round of 16
5	(United States) Maxwell Velazquez	11	4	11	3	5
9/12	(Canada) Asser Ibrahim	9	11	5	11	11
Quarterfinals
9/12	(Canada) Asser Ibrahim	8	12	9	15	8
13/16	(Canada) Abdelrahman Dweek	11	10	11	13	11
13/16	(Canada) Abdelrahman Dweek	8	11	5	11	11
4	(Egypt) Ismael Atef	11	9	11	3	5

=== Bottom half ===
==== Section 1 ====
First round
3	(Egypt) Aly Tolba	11	11	11
(Mexico) Jonathan Sosa	3	4	0
(Colombia) Daniel Sanchez Fonseca	1	4	5
(Ecuador) Mateo Romo	11	11	11
(United States) Udai Pal	11	11	11
(Canada) Noah Dommasch	1	7	6
(United States) Charles Merill	7	3	1
25/32	(United States) Jed Burde	11	11	11
17/24	(United States) Myles McIntyre	11	11	11
(New Zealand) Devlin Gurr	1	5	3
(United States) Coulter Mackesy	10	11	5	8
(Australia) Ethan Eyles	12	9	11	11
(United States) Graham Joyce	11	12	11
(Canada) Jonathan Fan	3	10	8
(England) Aflie Lawes	4	7	6
13/16	(Egypt) Mazen Dessouky	11	11	11
9/12	(India) Utkarsh Baheti	11	11	11
(Canada) Isaiah Miller	3	1	4
(Argentina) Lisandro Ortiz	9	11	8	7
(United States) Tyler Mackesy	11	9	11	11
(Hong Kong) Jun Hay Adrian Todd	9	11	8	4
(United States) Jacob Bulbulia	11	9	11	11
(United States) Andrew Aube	6	5	6
17/24	(Canada) Neel Ismail	11	11	11
25/32	(United States) Brian Leonard	11	11	11
(United States) Yos Wagenmans	6	4	4
(Mexico) Luis Alejandro Moncada Gonzalez	6	11	11	9	5
(Egypt) Omar Gohary	11	5	4	11	11
(South Korea) Il-Seok Dillon Park	11	11	10	6	11
(Japan) Jason Sano Herring	5	6	12	11	4
(United States) Andrew Lee	2	5	4
6	(United States) Dillon Huang	11	11	11

Second round
3	(Egypt) Aly Tolba	11	11	11
(Ecuador) Mateo Romo	1	2	1
(United States) Udai Pal	11	9	14	12
25/32	(United States) Jed Burde	4	11	12	10
17/24	(United States) Myles McIntyre	9	11	2	11	11
(Australia) Ethan Eyles	11	9	11	7	3
(United States) Graham Joyce	6	10	13
13/16	(Egypt) Mazen Dessouky	11	12	15
9/12	(India) Utkarsh Baheti	11	7	11	11
(United States) Tyler Mackesy	6	11	7	4
(United States) Jacob Bulbulia	6	2	5
17/24	(Canada) Neel Ismail	11	11	11
25/32	(United States) Brian Leonard	11	11	11
(Egypt) Omar Gohary	1	4	9
(South Korea) Il-Seok Dillon Park	1	2	rtd.
6	(United States) Dillon Huang	11	11

Third round
3	(Egypt) Aly Tolba	11	11	11
(United States) Udai Pal	5	6	9
17/24	(United States) Myles McIntyre	12	11	8	11
13/16	(Egypt) Mazen Dessouky	10	7	11	5
9/12	(India) Utkarsh Baheti	11	11	11
17/24	(Canada) Neel Ismail	7	9	7
25/32	(United States) Brian Leonard	10	4	7
6	(United States) Dillon Huang	12	11	11

Round of 16
3	(Egypt) Aly Tolba	11	4	11	11
17/24	(Australia) Myles McIntyre	7	11	9	9
Quarterfinals
3	(Egypt) Aly Tolba	11	11	9	11	7
9/12	(India) Utkarsh Baheti	13	5	11	9	11
9/12	(India) Utkarsh Baheti	3	11	8	13	11
6	(United States) Dillon Huang	11	4	11	11	7

==== Section 2 ====
First round
7	(Malaysia) Danial Nurhaqieum	11	11	11
(Canada) Edward Morneau	7	1	4
(Egypt) Omar Kiwan	6	5	7
(India) Tejas Chawla	11	11	11
(United States) Gordon Lam	11	8	11	11
(Mexico) Jose Sanchez	7	11	9	9
(United States) Sebastian Paredes	9	3	7
25/32	(Hong Kong) Janson Chu	11	11	11
17/24	(United States) Spencer Yager	11	8	11	11
(United States) Thomas (Jack) Winston	9	11	3	8
(Bermuda) Taylor Carrick	14	10	9	8
(Colombia) Andres Villamizar	13	12	11	11
(United States) Ryan Chen	11	11	14
(Mexico) Fabian Santiago	2	4	12
(Egypt) Mark Samir	5	5	9
9/12	(United States) Thomas Rosini	11	11	11
13/16	(Egypt) Karim Thabet	11	11	11
(Barbados) Kemar Lord	1	1	1
(Canada) Liam Watson	2	3	5
(United States) Kedar Nagaraj	11	11	11
(Canada) Sayeed Mavani	11	11	11
(United States) Nicholas Fehn	5	5	7
(United States) Blake Roshkoff	7	6	3
17/24	(Mexico) Leonardo Daniel Vargas	11	11	11
25/32	(United States) Yassin Amir	11	11	11
(England) Ethan Kaye	0	4	1
(Colombia) Juan Jose Ramirez	4	6	3
(New Zealand) Glenn Templeton	11	11	11
(United States) Eli Kramer	11	11	11
(Egypt) Omar Fares	1	5	7
(United States) Tyler Maguire	2	2	3
2	(United States) Ayush Menon	11	11	11

Second round
7	(Malaysia) Danial Nurhaqiem	1	11	15	11
(India) Tejas Chawla	11	2	13	3
(United States) Gordon Lam	11	8	11	11
25/32	(Hong Kong) Janson Chu	7	11	9	9
17/24	(United States) Spencer Yager	11	11	11
(Colombia) Andres Villamizar	7	5	9
(United States) Ryan Chen	4	6	9
9/12	(United States) Thomas Rosini	11	11	11
13/16	(Egypt) Karim Thabet	11	11	11
(United States) Kedar Nagaraj	8	9	6
(Canada) Sayeed Mavani	5	8	6
17/24	(Mexico) Leonardo Daniel Vargas	11	11	11
25/32	(United States) Yassin Amir	11	11	13
(New Zealand) Glenn Templeton	5	4	11
(United States) Eli Kramer	5	5	6
2	(United States) Ayush Menon	11	11	11

Third round
7	(Malaysia) Danial Nurhaqiem	11	11	11
(United States) Gordon Lam	7	7	6
17/24	(United States) Spencer Yager	6	5	8
9/12	(United States) Thomas Rosini	11	11	11
13/16	(Egypt) Karim Thabet	11	11	10	11
17/24	(Mexico) Leonardo Daniel Vargas	9	6	12	8
25/32	(United States) Yassin Amir	10	11	9	5
2	(United States) Ayush Menon	12	9	11	11

Round of 16
7	(Malaysia) Danial Nurhaqiem	12	11	11
9/12	(United States) Thomas Rosini	10	5	7
Quarterfinals
7	(Malaysia) Danial Nurhaqiem	9	7	14	10
2	(United States) Ayush Menon	11	11	12	12
13/16	(Egypt) Karim Thabet	9	6	12	7
2	(United States) Ayush Menon	11	11	10	11

== See also ==
- British Junior Open Squash 2017
- Dutch Junior Open Squash 2017
- World Junior Squash Championships
- Men's US Open 2017
