= 2024 in squash =

This topic lists the squash events for the 2023–24 season.

== World Championships ==
- May 9–17: 2024 World Squash Championships in (Egypt) Cairo

== Continental Championships ==
=== ASF ===
- May 8–12: 2nd Southeast Asian Junior Individual Championships in (Thailand) Bangkok
- June 12–16: 22nd Asian Team Championships in (China) Dalian
- June 25–29: 31st Asian Junior Individual Championships in (Pakistan) Islamabad
- July 4–7: Asian Squash Doubles Championships in (Malaysia) Johor
- September 24–28: 6th Asian Masters Championships in Macau

=== ESF ===
- March 23–26: 2024 ESF European U19 Squash Championships in (Romania) Bucharest
  - Winners: (England) Jonah Bryant (m) / (England) Amelie Haworth (w)
- March 28–31: 2024 ESF European Mixed Team u19 Squash Championships in (Romania) Bucharest
  - Winners: France (Melvil Scianimanico, Antonin Romieu, Amir Khaled-Jousselin, Lauren Baltayan & Rose Lucas-Marcuzzo)
- April 17–20: 2024 ESF European Team Division 3 Squash Championships in (Romania) Bucharest
- May 1–4: 2024 ESF European Team Division 1 & 2 Squash Championships in (Switzerland) Zürich
- May 9–12: 2024 ESF European Mixed Team u15 & u17 Squash Championships in (Portugal) Matosinhos
- August 21–24: 2024 ESF European Individual Closed Squash Championships in (Spain) Cuenca
- September 4–7: 2024 ESF European Club Squash Championships in (United Kingdom) London

=== ASF ===
- April 10–14: 2024 Bolivarian Youth Games in (Bolivia) Sucre
- June 16–22: XX Pan Am Juniors Championships (Online Event)
- August 4–10: XXV Pan American Senior Championships in (Peru) Lima
- September 12–15: 1st Pan American Squash57 Championships in (Bolivia) Cochabamba
- October 6–12: II Pan American U23 Championships in (Colombia) Bucaramanga

=== OSF ===
- April 12–14: Oceania Junior Championships 2024 in (Australia) Melbourne

== 2023–24 PSA World Tour ==
World Finals

- June 24–28: 2023-24 PSA World Tour Finals in TBC

Platinum

- August 27 – September 2, 2023: 2024 Paris Squash in (France) Paris
  - Winners: (Egypt) Ali Farag (m) / (Egypt) Nour El Sherbini (w)
- September 9–16, 2023: 2024 Qatar Classic in Doha
  - Winners: (Egypt) Ali Farag (m) / (Egypt) Hania El Hammamy (w)
- October 7–14, 2023: 2024 U.S. Open in (United States) Philadelphia
  - Winners: (New Zealand) Paul Coll (m) / (Egypt) Nour El Sherbini (w)
- November 27 – December 3, 2023: 2024 TTI Milwaukee HK Open in Hong Kong
  - Winners: (New Zealand) Paul Coll (m) / (Egypt) Hania El Hammamy (w)
- January 17–25: 2024 J.P. Morgan Tournament of Champions in (United States) New York City
  - Winners: (Egypt) Ali Farag (m) / (Egypt) Nour El Sherbini (w)
- February 21–28: 2024 Windy City Open in (United States) Chicago
  - Winners: (Egypt) Ali Farag (m) / (Egypt) Nour El Sherbini (w)
- April 19–26: 2024 El Gouna International in (Egypt) El Gouna
- June 2–9: 2024 British Open in (England) Birmingham

== 2024 ESF Season ==
=== ESF Masters Tournaments ===
- January 19–21: 2024 Portuguese Masters in (Portugal) Porto
- March 15–17: 2024 Spanish Masters in (Spain) Santiago de Compostela
- April 4–7: 2024 Slovenian Masters in (Slovenia) Ljubljana
- April 12–14: 2024 Swiss Masters in (Switzerland) Langnau am Albis
- April 19–21: 2024 Hungarian Masters in (Hungary) Győr
- May 10–12: 2024 Gibraltar Masters in Gibraltar
- May 24–26: 2024 Luxembourg Masters in Luxembourg
- June 7–9: 2024 Croatian Masters in (Croatia) Zagreb
- June 14–16: 2024 Danish Masters in (Denmark) Copenhagen
- July 5–7: 2024 French Masters in (France) Bordeaux
- August 2–4: 2024 Finnish Masters in (Finland) Helsinki
- September 13–15: 2024 Italian Masters in (Italy) Riccione
- September 27–29: 2024 Belgian Masters in (Belgium) Hasselt
- October 4–6: 2024 German Masters in (Germany) Hamburg
- October 17–20: 2024 Irish Masters in (Republic of Ireland) Dublin
- October 25–27: 2024 Polish Masters in (Poland) Kraków
- November 1–3: 2024 Maltese Masters in Malta
- November 15–17: 2024 Dutch Masters in (Netherlands) Den Haag
- November 22–24: 2024 Austrian Masters in (Austria) Graz
