= Dutch Junior Open Squash 2017 =

Dutch Junior Open
- 31st Dutch Junior Open Squash
- Location: Amsterdam, Netherlands
- Venue: Frans Otten Stadion
- Date: July 13 – 16, 2017
- Website www.djosquash.nl

Results
- Champion: (England) Curtis Malik
- Runner-up: (United States) Charles Culhane
- Semi-finalists: (India) Vikas Mehra / (Israel) Yali Shass

The Dutch Junior Open Squash 2017 is the men's edition of the 2017 Dutch Junior Open Squash, which is a World Junior Squash Circuit Tier 2 event. The event took place at the Frans Otten Stadion from July 13 to 16. Englishman Curtis Malik won his first Dutch Junior Open title after defeating American Charles Culhane in the Boys' Under 19 final in a tightly-contested, 72-minute five game encounter.

== Seeds (Boys' Under 19) ==
1. [1*] (Denmark) Magnus Laursen (quarterfinals)
2. [2*] (Canada) Michael Mehl (quarterfinals)
3. [3/4*] (Netherlands) Thijs Roukens (quarterfinals)
4. [3/4*] (Israel) Yali Shass (semifinals)
5. [5/8*] (France) Edwin Clain (third round)
6. [5/8*] (Spain) Sergio Garcia Pollan(third round)
7. [5/8*] (Netherlands) Frank Goossens (third round)
8. [5/8*] (Belgium) Cedric De Vos (first round)
9. [9/12*] (India) Vikas Mehra (semifinals)
10. [9/12*] (Qatar) Hamad Al-Amri (first round)
11. [9/12*] (Sweden) Nicholas Goth-Errington (first round)
12. [9/12*] (Norway) Gard Aasness (second round)
13. [13/16*] (France) Alexandre Dubarry (first round)
14. [13/16*] (Hungary) Olivér Lantos (second round)
15. [13/16*] (Wales) Aran Edwards (first round)
16. [13/16*] (India) Aryan Parekh (third round)

== Draw and results ==
=== Finals ===
Quarterfinals
1	(Denmark) Magnus Laursen	9	13	5	12
9/12	(India) Vikas Mehra	11	11	11	14
(England) Curtis Malik	11	10	11	11
3/4	(Netherlands) Thijs Roukens	9	12	3	2
3/4	(Israel) Yali Shass	9	11	11	11
(France) Adrien Grasser	11	5	9	8
(United States) Charles Culhane	11	11	5	11
2	(Canada) Michael Mehl	7	9	11	6

Semifinals
9/12	(India) Vikas Mehra	9	2	8
(England) Curtis Malik	11	11	11
3/4	(Israel) Yali Shass	5	7	2
(United States) Charles Culhane	11	11	11	11

Final
(England) Curtis Malik	11	7	14	11	11
(United States) Charles Culhane	9	11	16	5	6

=== Top half ===
==== Section 1 ====
First round
1	(Denmark) Magnus Laursen
(United States) Ben Goldstein	3	15	5	3
(Netherlands) Dennis Krukkert	11	13	11	11
(Estonia) Margus Lomp	5	2	6
(United States) Zachary Bradlow	11	11	11
(England) Aaron Allpress	14	11	11
13/16	(France) Alexandre Dubarry	12	5	6
9/12	(India) Vikas Mehra	11	11	11
(United States) Gus Prager	5	7	2
(United States) Tyler Burt	6	5	4
(France) Adrien Douillard	11	11	11
(Germany) Julius Winkler	11	11	11
(Estonia) Walter Herold Veedla	5	4	4
(United States) Maximo Moyer	4	8	4
5/8	(France) Edwin Clain	11	11	11

Second round
1	(Denmark) Magnus Laursen	11	11	11
(Netherlands) Dennis Krukkert	6	5	8
(United States) Zachary Bradlow	7	8	5
(England) Aaron Allpress	11	11
9/12	(India) Vikas Mehra	11	12	11	13
(France) Adrien Douillard	8	10	13	11	5
(Germany) Julius Winkler	7	4	5
5/8	(France) Edwin Clain	11	11	11

Third round
1	(Denmark) Magnus Laursen	11	11	11
(England) Aaron Allpress	2	9	8
9/12	(India) Vikas Mehra	11	15	11
5/8	(France) Edwin Clain	8	13	9

Quarterfinals
1	(Denmark) Magnus Laursen	9	13	5	12
9/12	(India) Vikas Mehra	11	11	11	14

==== Section 2 ====
First round
5/8	(Spain) Sergio Garcia Pollan
(United States) William Dewire	3	13	11	11
(Germany) Julius Benthin	11	11	8	7
(England) Curtis Malik	11	11	11
(United States) Edward Eill	5	2	5
(England) Michael Mattimore	18	3	11	11
9/12	(Qatar) Hamad Al-Amri	16	11	3	6
13/16	(Hungary) Olivér Lantos	11	11	11
(United States) Jason Friedman	5	7	5
(Belgium) Thomas Van Riet	1	3	5
(France) Quentin Leclerc	11	11	11
(Canada) Justin Ghaeli	4	11	11	11	11
(Spain) Cristian Blazquez Romero	11	7	13	3	8
3/4	(Netherlands) Thijs Roukens

Second round
5/8	(Spain) Sergio Garcia Pollan	11	11	11
(United States) William Dewire	7	6	7
(England) Curtis Malik	11	7	11	11
(England) Michael Mattimore	6	11	9	4
13/16	(Hungary) Olivér Lantos	5	7	7
(France) Quentin Leclerc	11	11	11
(Canada) Justin Ghaeli	11	11	3	6	10
3/4	(Netherlands) Thijs Roukens	9	4	11	11	12

Third round
5/8	(Spain) Sergio Garcia Pollan	7	0	8
(England) Curtis Malik	11	11	11
(France) Quentin Leclerc	6	9	2
3/4	(Netherlands) Thijs Roukens	11	11	11

Quarterfinals
(England) Curtis Malik	11	10	11	11
3/4	(Netherlands) Thijs Roukens	9	12	3	2

=== Bottom half ===
==== Section 1 ====
First round
3/4	(Israel) Yali Shass
(England) Carlton Oldham	11	14	11	10	11
(India) Arman Jindal	13	12	5	12	9
(Botswana) Theo Pelonomi	11	11	11
(Netherlands) Bjarni Kemperman	4	9	8
(England) Toby Harding	11	11	11
13/16	(Wales) Aran Edwards	3	4	9
9/12	(Sweden) Nicholas Goth-Errington	7	10	9
(Canada) Liam Leidekker	11	12	11
(France) Adrien Grasser	11	11	11
(Netherlands) Nick Kamperman	3	9	4
(Germany) Maurice Hansmann	4	7	4
(United States) Wiatt Hinton	11	11	11
5/8	(Netherlands) Frank Goossens

Second round
3/4	(Israel) Yali Shass	11	11	11
(England) Carlton Oldham	4	8	0
(Botswana) Theo Pelonomi	7	11	3	4
(England) Toby Harding	11	8	11	11
(Canada) Liam Leidekker	3	1	3
(France) Adrien Grasser	11	11	11
(United States) Wiatt Hinton	5	5	11	5
5/8	(Netherlands) Frank Goosens	11	11	6	11

Third round
3/4	(Israel) Yali Shass	11	11	11
(England) Toby Harding	9	9	7
(France) Adrien Grasser	7	11	11	11
5/8	(Netherlands) Frank Goossens	11	9	8	6

Quarterfinals
3/4	(Israel) Yali Shass	9	11	11	11
(France) Adrien Grasser	11	5	9	8

==== Section 2 ====
First round
5/8	(Belgium) Cedric De Vos	7	6	11	11	8
(France) Hugo Mandil	11	11	9	8	11
(United States) Aditya Kankariya	11	8	11	11
(Canada) William Kuhn	8	11	7	5
(United States) Charles Culhane	11	11	11
(England) Jack Cooper	9	1	6
(Iran) Mohammad Ali Farhat	7	7	11	11	8
9/12	(Norway) Gard Aasness	11	11	4	3	11
13/16	(India) Aryan Parekh	12	11	11
(Peru) Álvaro García	10	4	9
(England) George Sawrey-Cookson	12	11	11
(France) Valentin Alberti	10	9	5
(England) Paul Broadberry	11	11	11
(United States) William Mattson	5	1	9
2	(Canada) Michael Mehl

Second round
(France) Hugo Mandil	10	11	2	7
(United States) Aditya Kankariya	12	5	11	11
(United States) Charles Culhane	11	11	11
9/12	(Norway) Gard Aasness	3	3	4
13/16	(India) Aryan Parekh	6	11	11	11
(England) George Sawrey-Cookson	11	9	5	9
(England) Paul Broadberry	11	11	8	11	6
2	(Canada) Michael Mehl	9	9	11	13	11

Third round
(United States) Aditya Kankariya	2	3	3
(United States) Charles Culhane	11	11	11
13/16	(India) Aryan Parekh	4	11	3	4
2	(Canada) Michael Mehl	11	9	11	11

Quarterfinals
(United States) Charles Culhane	11	11	5	11
2	(Canada) Michael Mehl	7	9	11	6

== See also ==
- British Junior Open Squash 2017
- French Junior Open Squash
- 2017 US Junior Open Squash Championships
- World Junior Squash Championships
