= 2024 Men's PSA World Tour Finals =

PSA World Tour Finals
- 6th Men's PSA World Tour Finals
- Location: Bellevue, United States
- Venue: Boys & Girls Club at Hidden Valley Fieldhouse
- Date: 18–22 June 2024
- Website; Official website
- Prize money: $224,500

Results
- Champion: Ali Farag (EGY)
- Runner-up: Mostafa Asal (EGY)
- Semi-finalists: Paul Coll (NZL); Tarek Momen (EGY)

The 2024 Xbox Men's PSA World Tour Finals is the men's sixth edition of the PSA World Tour Finals (Prize money : $224,500). The top 8 players in the 2023–24 PSA World Tour are qualified for the event. The event took place at the Boys & Girls Club at Hidden Valley Fieldhouse on 18–22 June 2024. It was the second time that United States hosts the PSA World Tour Finals after 2014 (Richmond).

It's the sixth edition under the PSA World Tour Finals label after the PSA renamed PSA World Series to current PSA World Tour Finals. Xbox replaced CIB as the main sponsor.

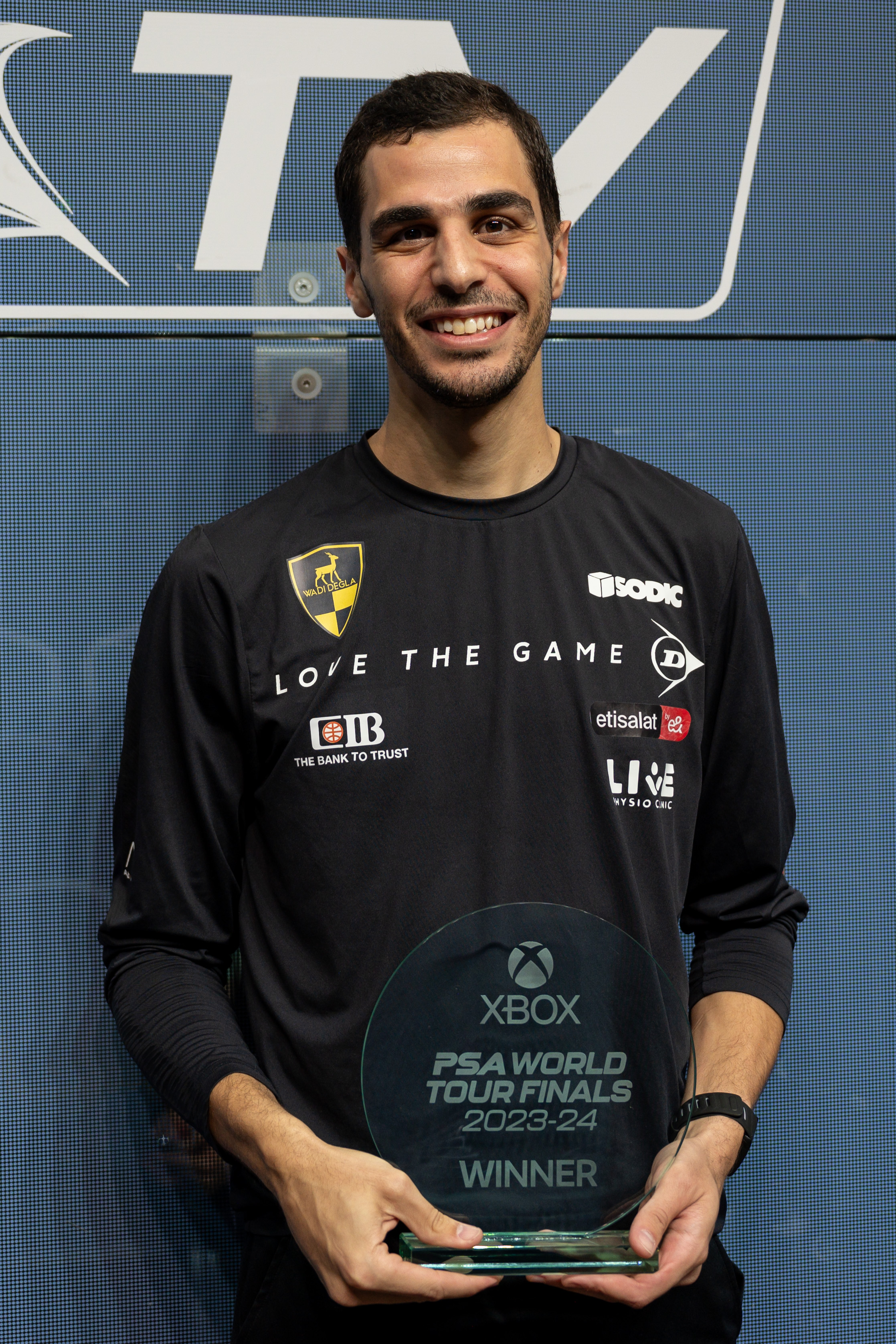
Ali Farag with the winner's trophy.

== PSA World Ranking Points ==
PSA also awards points towards World Ranking. Points are awarded as follows:

PSA World Tour Finals		Ranking Points				
Rank	Prize money US$	Winner	Runner up	3/4	Round-Robin Match Win	Undefeated bonus
World Tour Finals	$224,500	1000	550	200	150	150

=== Match points distribution ===
Points towards the standings are awarded when the following scores:

Match score	Points
2–0 win	4 points
2–1 win	3 points
1–2 loss	1 point
0–2 loss	0 points

== Schedule ==
Day	Round	Round date
1	Group stage 1st match	18 June 2024
2	Group stage 2nd match	19 June 2024
3	Group stage 3rd match	20 June 2024
4	Semifinals	21 June 2024
5	Final	22 June 2024

== Qualification & Seeds ==
=== Qualification ===
Top eight players at 2023–24 PSA World Tour standings qualifies to Finals.

World Championship
177.5	1st Round	290	2nd Round
475	3rd Round	780	Quarterfinalist
1270	Semifinalist	2090	Runner-up
**3175**	Winner		

Platinum
152.5	1st Round	250	2nd Round
410	3rd Round	675	Quarterfinalist
1100	Semifinalist	1810	Runner-up
**2750**	Winner		

Gold
160	1st Round	260	2nd Round
430	Quarterfinalist	700	Semifinalist
1150	Runner-up	**1750**	Winner

Silver
112.5	1st Round	182.5	2nd Round
300	Quarterfinalist	490	Semifinalist
805	Runner-up	**1225**	Winner

Bronze
80	1st Round	130	2nd Round
215	Quarterfinalist	350	Semifinalist
575	Runner-up	**875**	Winner

Top 16 Men's PSA World Tour Standings 2023–24
Rank	Player	Tournaments Played	CAN (Canada)	FRA (France)	QAT (Qatar)	USA (United States)	SUI (Switzerland)	QAT (Qatar)	MYS (Malaysia)	SGP (Singapore)	HKG (Hong Kong)	HKG (Hong Kong)	NZL (New Zealand)	USA (United States)	USA (United States)	USA (United States)	USA (United States)	USA (United States)	USA (United States)	USA (United States)	CAN (Canada)	USA (United States)	ENG (England)	AUS (Australia)	ENG (England)	GER (Germany)	EGY (Egypt)	EGY (Egypt)	EGY (Egypt)	ENG (England)	QAT (Qatar)	ENG (England)	Total Points
1	(Egypt) **Ali Farag**	13	DNP	**2750**	**2750**	1810	DNP	DNP	DNP	**1750**	DNP	1810	DNP	DNP	**2750**	DNP	DNP	**1750**	DNP	**2750**	DNP	DNP	1150	DNP	DNP	DNP	1150	**2750**	1270	DNP	DNP	1810	26250
2	(New Zealand) **Paul Coll**	14	DNP	1100	250	**2750**	DNP	DNP	DNP	430	DNP	**2750**	**1225**	DNP	675	805	DNP	DNP	DNP	1810	DNP	DNP	**1750**	DNP	**1750**	DNP	DNP	675	1270	DNP	DNP	1100	18340
3	(Egypt) **Mostafa Asal**	14	DNP	DNP	DNP	DNP	430	DNP	575	700	DNP	1100	DNP	**1750**	1100	DNP	DNP	430	DNP	1100	DNP	DNP	700	DNP	1150	DNP	**1750**	1810	2090	DNP	DNP	**2750**	17435
4	(Peru) **Diego Elías**	13	DNP	1810	1810	1100	DNP	DNP	DNP	1150	DNP	675	DNP	700	1810	**1225**	DNP	DNP	DNP	675	**1225**	DNP	DNP	DNP	DNP	DNP	DNP	675	**3175**	DNP	DNP	675	16705
5	(Egypt) **Karim Abdel Gawad**	15	DNP	250	675	250	**1750**	DNP	**875**	DNP	DNP	410	DNP	DNP	DNP	DNP	**1225**	700	DNP	675	DNP	DNP	700	DNP	430	DNP	700	1100	780	DNP	DNP	410	10930
6	(Egypt) **Mazen Hesham**	14	DNP	675	1100	675	260	DNP	DNP	DNP	DNP	675	DNP	1150	675	DNP	DNP	1150	DNP	1100	805	DNP	DNP	DNP	DNP	DNP	700	250	780	DNP	DNP	675	10670
7	(Egypt) **Tarek Momen**	15	**875**	675	675	1100	DNP	575	DNP	DNP	DNP	675	DNP	430	675	DNP	DNP	430	DNP	410	DNP	DNP	DNP	DNP	DNP	DNP	260	1100	780	DNP	**875**	250	9785
8	(England) **Mohd. El Shorbagy**	14	DNP	1100	675	675	430	DNP	DNP	430	DNP	1100	DNP	700	675	DNP	DNP	700	DNP	675	DNP	DNP	430	DNP	DNP	DNP	DNP	675	780	DNP	DNP	410	9455
9	(Wales) Joel Makin	13	DNP	675	1100	DNP	1150	DNP	DNP	DNP	DNP	DNP	490	430	DNP	DNP	DNP	DNP	DNP	DNP	DNP	DNP	430	DNP	700	350	260	250	475	**1225**	DNP	1100	8635
10	(England) Marw. El Shorbagy	16	DNP	410	250	675	700	DNP	DNP	700	DNP	675	805	DNP	410	DNP	805	DNP	DNP	DNP	DNP	DNP	430	DNP	430	130	DNP	410	475	182.5	DNP	410	7897.5
11	(Egypt) Youssef Soliman	16	575	250	410	410	DNP	DNP	DNP	430	DNP	410	DNP	DNP	250	DNP	490	DNP	**875**	250	490	DNP	DNP	**875**	DNP	DNP	DNP	410	475	300	DNP	410	7310
12	(France) Victor Crouin	15	DNP	675	410	250	DNP	350	215	DNP	DNP	410	490	DNP	1100	DNP	DNP	DNP	350	675	DNP	DNP	DNP	575	DNP	DNP	260	250	475	DNP	DNP	250	6735
13	(Egypt) Youssef Ibrahim	16	DNP	DNP	410	410	430	DNP	DNP	260	DNP	250	DNP	DNP	410	182.5	490	DNP	350	250	DNP	350	DNP	DNP	DNP	DNP	430	250	475	490	DNP	410	5847.5
14	(Malaysia) Eain Yow	15	DNP	250	250	DNP	DNP	DNP	350	260	575	250	DNP	DNP	250	DNP	DNP	DNP	DNP	152.5	DNP	215	DNP	DNP	260	**875**	DNP	250	475	DNP	575	675	5662.5
15	(Egypt) Aly Abou Eleinen	14	DNP	250	410	410	DNP	DNP	DNP	DNP	**875**	250	DNP	DNP	250	DNP	DNP	430	DNP	250	DNP	DNP	DNP	DNP	430	DNP	260	675	290	DNP	215	250	5245
16	(Scotland) Greg Lobban	14	215	410	675	250	260	DNP	DNP	DNP	DNP	152.5	DNP	DNP	250	DNP	DNP	DNP	215	250	DNP	350	DNP	DNP	DNP	DNP	DNP	410	290	805	DNP	250	4782.5

Bold – Players qualified for the final
(*) – Winners of Platinum's tournaments automatically qualifies for Finals.

=== Seeds ===
1. (Egypt) Ali Farag
2. (New Zealand) Paul Coll
3. (Egypt) Mostafa Asal
4. (Peru) Diego Elías
5. (Egypt) Karim Abdel Gawad
6. (Egypt) Mazen Hesham
7. (Egypt) Tarek Momen
8. (England) Mohamed El Shorbagy

== Group stage results ==
Times are Pacific Daylight Time (UTC−07:00). To the best of three games.

=== Group A ===
Date	Time	Player 1	Player 2	Score
18 June	16:15	Ali Farag (EGY)	Karim Abdel Gawad (EGY)	11–7, 11–2
18 June	18:45	Mostafa Asal (EGY)	Mohamed El Shorbagy (ENG)	11–6, 11–4
19 June	18:45	Ali Farag (EGY)	Mostafa Asal (EGY)	11–10, 11–6
19 June	20:30	Karim Abdel Gawad (EGY)	Mohamed El Shorbagy (ENG)	9–11, 11–6, 11–8
20 June	18:45	Ali Farag (EGY)	Mohamed El Shorbagy (ENG)	w/o
20 June	20:30	Mostafa Asal (EGY)	Karim Abdel Gawad (EGY)	11–7, 10–11, 11–3

==== Standings ====
Pos	Team	Pld	W	L	GF	GA	GD	Pts	Qualification
1	Ali Farag (EGY)	3	3	0	66	25	+41	12	Advancing to Semifinals
2	Mostafa Asal (EGY)	3	2	1	70	53	+17	7	Advancing to Semifinals
3	Karim Abdel Gawad (EGY)	3	1	2	61	79	−18	4	
4	Mohamed El Shorbagy (ENG)	3	0	3	35	75	−40	1	

Source: PSA World Tour Finals

=== Group B ===
Date	Time	Player 1	Player 2	Score
18 June	14:45	Diego Elías (PER)	Tarek Momen (EGY)	11–7, 11–4
18 June	16:15	Paul Coll (NZL)	Mazen Hesham (EGY)	11–9, 11–2
19 June	14:45	Mazen Hesham (EGY)	Tarek Momen (EGY)	10–11, 11–6, 11–9
19 June	16:15	Paul Coll (NZL)	Diego Elías (PER)	11–8, 11–9
20 June	14:45	Diego Elías (PER)	Mazen Hesham (EGY)	w/o
20 June	16:15	Paul Coll (NZL)	Tarek Momen (EGY)	11–6, 11–3

==== Standings ====
Pos	Team	Pld	W	L	GF	GA	GD	Pts	Qualification
1	Tarek Momen (EGY)	3	2	1	70	52	+18	9	Advancing to Semifinals
2	Paul Coll (NZL)	3	2	1	53	50	+3	8	Advancing to Semifinals
3	Mazen Hesham (EGY)	3	2	1	65	48	+17	7	
4	Diego Elías (PER)	3	0	3	28	66	−38	0	

Source: PSA World Tour Finals

== Knockout stage ==
Semi finals (21 June)
1	Ali Farag (EGY)	11	11
2	Paul Coll (NZL)	10	6
7	Tarek Momen (EGY)	3	5
3	Mostafa Asal (EGY)	11	11

Final (22 June)
1	Ali Farag (EGY)	11	5
3	Mostafa Asal (EGY)	5	2^{rtd.}

=== Semifinal ===
To the best of three games.

Date	Time	Player 1	Player 2	Score
21 June	18:45	Mostafa Asal (EGY)	Tarek Momen (EGY)	11–3, 11–5
21 June	20:15	Ali Farag (EGY)	Paul Coll (NZL)	11–10, 11–6

=== Final ===
To the best of five games.

Date	Time	Player 1	Player 2	Score
22 June	16:00	Ali Farag (EGY)	Mostafa Asal (EGY)	11–5, 5–2^{rtd.}

2024 Men's PSA World Tour Finals winner
(Egypt)
Ali Farag
First title

== See also ==
- 2024 Women's PSA World Tour Finals
- 2023–24 PSA World Tour Finals
