= 2024 Women's PSA World Tour Finals =

PSA World Tour Finals
- 6th Women's PSA World Tour Finals
- Location: Bellevue, United States
- Venue: Boys & Girls Club at Hidden Valley Fieldhouse
- Date: 18–22 June 2024
- Website; Official website
- Prize money: $224,500

Results
- Champion: Nouran Gohar (EGY)
- Runner-up: Nour El Sherbini (EGY)
- Semi-finalists: Hania El Hammamy (EGY); Nele Gilis (BEL)

The 2024 Xbox Women's PSA World Tour Finals is the women's sixth edition of the PSA World Tour Finals (Prize money : $224,500). The top 8 players in the 2023–24 PSA World Tour are qualified for the event. The event took place at the Boys & Girls Club at Hidden Valley Fieldhouse on 18–22 June 2024. It was the second time that United States hosted the PSA World Tour Finals after 2014 (Richmond).

It's the sixth edition under the PSA World Tour Finals label after the PSA renamed PSA World Series to current PSA World Tour Finals. Xbox replaced CIB as the main sponsor.

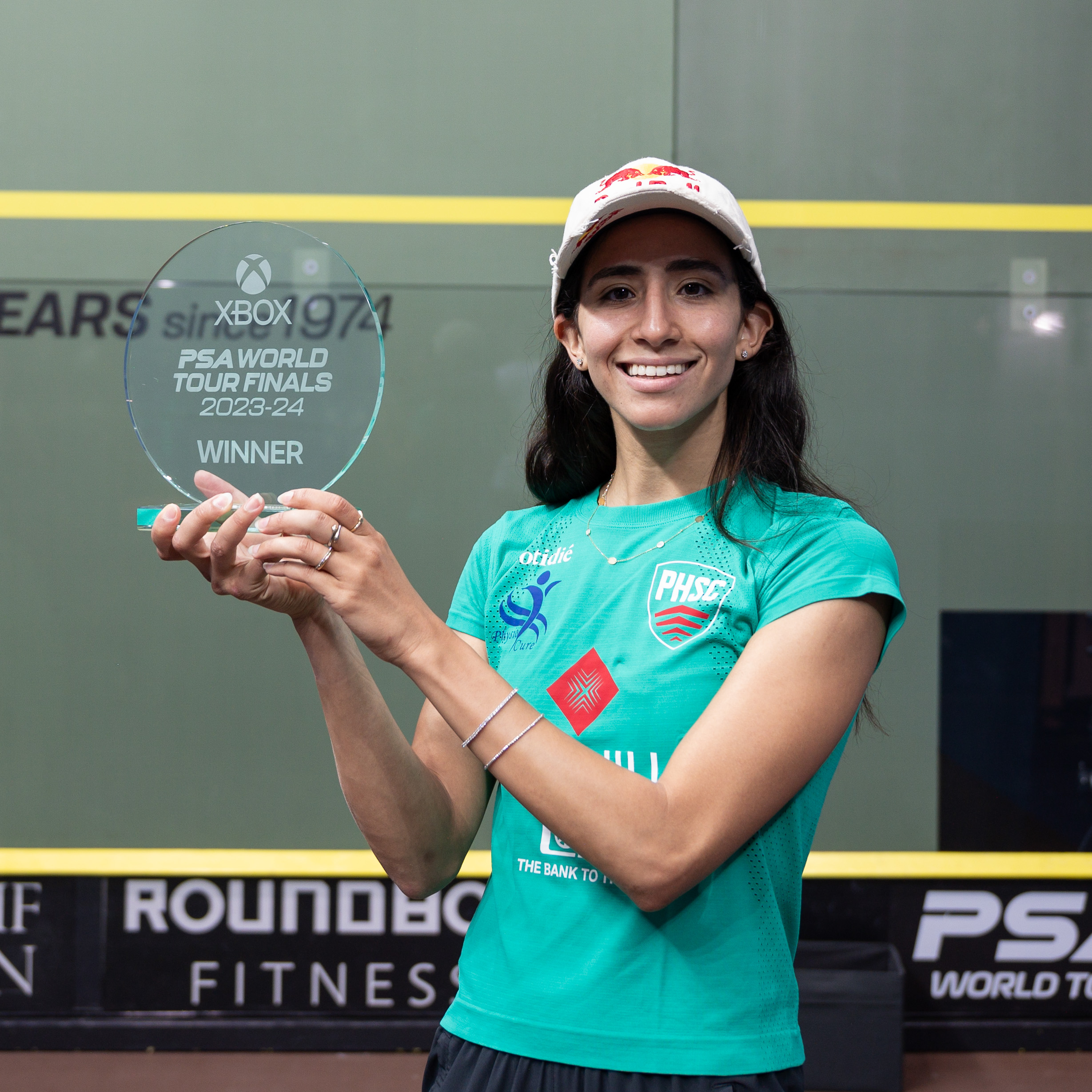
Nouran Gohar with the winner's trophy

== PSA World Ranking Points ==
PSA also awards points towards World Ranking. Points are awarded as follows:

PSA World Tour Finals		Ranking Points				
Rank	Prize money US$	Winner	Runner up	3/4	Round-Robin Match Win	Undefeated bonus
World Tour Finals	$224,500	1000	550	200	150	150

=== Match points distribution ===
Points towards the standings are awarded when the following scores:

Match score	Points
2–0 win	4 points
2–1 win	3 points
1–2 loss	1 point
0–2 loss	0 points

== Schedule ==
Day	Round	Round date
1	Group stage 1st match	18 June 2024
2	Group stage 2nd match	19 June 2024
3	Group stage 3rd match	20 June 2024
4	Semifinals	21 June 2024
5	Final	22 June 2024

== Qualification & Seeds ==
=== Qualification ===
Top eight players at 2023–24 PSA World Tour standings qualifies to Finals.

World Championship
177.5	1st Round	290	2nd Round
475	3rd Round	780	Quarterfinalist
1270	Semifinalist	2090	Runner-up
**3175**	Winner		

Platinum
152.5	1st Round	250	2nd Round
410	3rd Round	675	Quarterfinalist
1100	Semifinalist	1810	Runner-up
**2750**	Winner		

Gold
160	1st Round	260	2nd Round
430	Quarterfinalist	700	Semifinalist
1150	Runner-up	**1750**	Winner

Silver
112.5	1st Round	182.5	2nd Round
300	Quarterfinalist	490	Semifinalist
805	Runner-up	**1225**	Winner

Bronze
80	1st Round	130	2nd Round
215	Quarterfinalist	350	Semifinalist
575	Runner-up	**875**	Winner

Top 16 Women's World Tour Standings 2023–24
Rank	Player	Tournaments Played	FRA (France)	QAT (Qatar)	USA (United States)	USA (United States)	SUI (Switzerland)	MYS (Malaysia)	SGP (Singapore)	HKG (Hong Kong)	HKG (Hong Kong)	NZL (New Zealand)	USA (United States)	USA (United States)	USA (United States)	USA (United States)	USA (United States)	USA (United States)	USA (United States)	USA (United States)	ENG (England)	AUS (Australia)	ENG (England)	GER (Germany)	EGY (Egypt)	EGY (Egypt)	EGY (Egypt)	ENG (England)	ENG (England)	Total Points
1	(Egypt) **Nour El Sherbini**	12	**2750**	1810	DNP	**2750**	**1750**	DNP	DNP	DNP	1100	DNP	**1750**	**2750**	DNP	DNP	DNP	DNP	**2750**	DNP	DNP	DNP	430	DNP	DNP	1810	2090	DNP	1810	23550
2	(Egypt) **Nouran Gohar**	11	1810	675	DNP	DNP	DNP	DNP	DNP	DNP	DNP	DNP	700	1810	DNP	DNP	490	DNP	1810	DNP	DNP	DNP	700	DNP	**1750**	**2750**	**3175**	DNP	**2750**	18420
3	(Egypt) **Hania El Hammamy**	11	410	**2750**	DNP	1810	1150	DNP	DNP	DNP	**2750**	DNP	1150	1100	DNP	DNP	DNP	DNP	1100	DNP	DNP	DNP	1150	DNP	DNP	DNP	1270	DNP	1100	15740
4	(United States) **Olivia Weaver**	16	410	410	430	1100	DNP	DNP	DNP	DNP	250	DNP	700	675	350	**1225**	**1225**	DNP	675	490	DNP	DNP	DNP	DNP	1150	675	1270	DNP	675	11710
5	(England) **Georgina Kennedy**	15	1100	675	DNP	675	700	DNP	700	350	DNP	DNP	DNP	250	DNP	490	DNP	DNP	1100	805	DNP	DNP	430	**875**	DNP	1100	475	**1225**	675	11625
6	(Belgium) **Nele Gilis**	15	675	675	DNP	675	700	DNP	**1750**	DNP	1100	**1225**	DNP	410	DNP	DNP	DNP	DNP	675	DNP	575	DNP	700	575	DNP	410	475	DNP	410	11030
7	(Egypt) **Nour El Tayeb**	14	675	250	**1750**	675	DNP	**875**	260	DNP	DNP	DNP	DNP	675	DNP	DNP	DNP	DNP	250	**1225**	DNP	DNP	DNP	DNP	700	675	780	805	1100	10695
8	(Belgium) **Tinne Gilis**	15	250	1100	DNP	410	DNP	DNP	1150	DNP	675	805	DNP	410	DNP	805	DNP	575	675	DNP	DNP	DNP	DNP	215	700	1100	780	DNP	675	10325
9	(Egypt) Salma Hany	16	410	675	700	410	DNP	DNP	430	DNP	410	DNP	DNP	410	350	DNP	DNP	DNP	410	DNP	DNP	**875**	DNP	350	430	675	475	490	675	8175
10	(Egypt) Rowan Elaraby	15	250	410	DNP	410	430	DNP	430	DNP	675	DNP	DNP	1100	DNP	490	805	DNP	410	DNP	DNP	DNP	DNP	DNP	430	675	780	490	250	8035
11	(Malaysia) Sivasangari Subramaniam	15	DNP	410	DNP	250	DNP	350	430	**875**	675	DNP	430	250	DNP	300	DNP	DNP	410	490	DNP	DNP	**1750**	DNP	DNP	250	475	DNP	250	7595
12	(Egypt) Amina Orfi	14	250	410	DNP	675	DNP	215	DNP	575	410	DNP	430	675	DNP	DNP	DNP	**875**	410	DNP	DNP	575	DNP	DNP	260	410	475	DNP	DNP	6645
13	(United States) Amanda Sobhy	5	1100	1100	1150	1100	DNP	DNP	DNP	DNP	1810	DNP	DNP	DNP	DNP	DNP	DNP	DNP	DNP	DNP	DNP	DNP	DNP	DNP	DNP	DNP	DNP	DNP	DNP	6260
14	(England) Sarah-Jane Perry	17	250	410	DNP	250	430	DNP	700	350	410	DNP	DNP	250	215	182.5	DNP	DNP	250	DNP	215	DNP	430	DNP	DNP	410	475	182.5	410	5820
15	(Egypt) Fayrouz Aboelkheir	16	250	250	DNP	152.5	260	DNP	DNP	130	152.5	DNP	DNP	675	575	300	DNP	DNP	250	DNP	DNP	DNP	430	215	260	250	780	DNP	410	5340
16	(United States) Sabrina Sobhy	13	675	250	DNP	250	430	DNP	430	215	250	DNP	DNP	410	DNP	DNP	DNP	350	675	DNP	DNP	DNP	DNP	DNP	DNP	DNP	475	300	410	5120

Bold – Players qualified for the final
(*) – Winners of Platinum's tournaments automatically qualifies for Finals.

=== Seeds ===
1. (Egypt) Nour El Sherbini
2. (Egypt) Nouran Gohar
3. (Egypt) Hania El Hammamy
4. (United States) Olivia Weaver
5. (England) Georgina Kennedy
6. (Belgium) Nele Gilis
7. (Egypt) Nour El Tayeb
8. (Belgium) Tinne Gilis

== Group stage results ==
Times are Pacific Daylight Time (UTC−07:00). To the best of three games.

=== Group A ===
Date	Time	Player 1	Player 2	Score
18 June	18:00	Nour El Sherbini (EGY)	Nele Gilis (BEL)	11–3, 11–2
18 June	19:45	Olivia Weaver (USA)	Tinne Gilis (BEL)	11–9, 11–8
19 June	18:00	Nele Gilis (BEL)	Tinne Gilis (BEL)	11–9, 11–4
19 June	19:45	Nour El Sherbini (EGY)	Olivia Weaver (USA)	11–4, 10–11, 11–7
20 June	18:00	Nour El Sherbini (EGY)	Tinne Gilis (BEL)	11–4, 11–9
20 June	19:45	Olivia Weaver (USA)	Nele Gilis (BEL)	11–9, 4–11, 11–6

==== Standings ====
Pos	Team	Pld	W	L	GF	GA	GD	Pts	Qualification
1	Nour El Sherbini (EGY)	3	3	0	76	40	+36	11	Advancing to Semifinals
2	Nele Gilis (BEL)	3	2	1	53	61	−8	7	Advancing to Semifinals
3	Olivia Weaver (USA)	3	1	2	70	75	−5	6	
4	Tinne Gilis (BEL)	3	0	3	43	66	−23	0	

Source: PSA World Tour Finals

=== Group B ===
Date	Time	Player 1	Player 2	Score
18 June	14:00	Hania El Hammamy (EGY)	Nour El Tayeb (EGY)	8–11, 11–9, 11–5
18 June	15:30	Nouran Gohar (EGY)	Georgina Kennedy (ENG)	11–7, 11–10
19 June	14:00	Georgina Kennedy (ENG)	Nour El Tayeb (EGY)	11–8, 11–4
19 June	15:30	Nouran Gohar (EGY)	Hania El Hammamy (EGY)	11–9, 11–5
20 June	14:00	Hania El Hammamy (EGY)	Georgina Kennedy (ENG)	11–6, 11–9
20 June	15:30	Nouran Gohar (EGY)	Nour El Tayeb (EGY)	11–4, 11–3

==== Standings ====
Pos	Team	Pld	W	L	GF	GA	GD	Pts	Qualification
1	Nouran Gohar (EGY)	3	3	0	66	38	+28	12	Advancing to Semifinals
2	Hania El Hammamy (EGY)	3	2	1	66	62	+4	7	Advancing to Semifinals
3	Georgina Kennedy (ENG)	3	1	2	54	56	−2	4	
4	Nour El Tayeb (EGY)	3	0	3	44	74	−30	1	

Source: PSA World Tour Finals

== Knockout stage ==
Semi finals (21 June)
1	Nour El Sherbini (EGY)	11	11
3	Hania El Hammamy (EGY)	9	9
6	Nele Gilis (BEL)	9	7
2	Nouran Gohar (EGY)	11	11

Final (22 June)
1	Nour El Sherbini (EGY)	11	2	9	10
2	Nouran Gohar (EGY)	7	11	11	11

=== Semifinal ===
To the best of three games.

Date	Time	Player 1	Player 2	Score
21 June	18:00	Nouran Gohar (EGY)	Nele Gilis (BEL)	11–9, 11–7
21 June	19:30	Nour El Sherbini (EGY)	Hania El Hammamy (EGY)	11–9, 11–9

=== Final ===
To the best of five games.

Date	Time	Player 1	Player 2	Score
22 June	15:00	Nour El Sherbini (EGY)	Nouran Gohar (EGY)	7–11, 11-2, 11–9, 11–10

2024 Women's PSA World Tour Finals winner
(Egypt)
Nouran Gohar
Third title

== See also ==
- 2024 Men's PSA World Tour Finals
- 2023–24 PSA World Tour Finals
