= 2023–24 PSA World Tour Finals =

2023–24 PSA World Tour

Details
- Event name: 2023–24 PSA World Tour Finals
- Website; PSA World Tour standings
- Year: 2023–24 PSA World Tour

The 2023–24 PSA World Tour is a series of men's and women's squash tournaments which are part of the Professional Squash Association (PSA) PSA World Tour from August 2023 until July 2024. The PSA World Tour tournaments are some of the most prestigious events on the men's and women's tour. The best-performing players in the World Tour events qualify for the annual Men's and Women's Finals.

Starting in August 2018, PSA replaced World Series tournaments with new PSA World Tour, comprising four new tournament-tiers: Platinum ($170,500–$300,000), Gold ($90,000–$110,500), Silver ($70,000–$85,000) and Bronze ($45,000–$55,000) each one awarding different points.

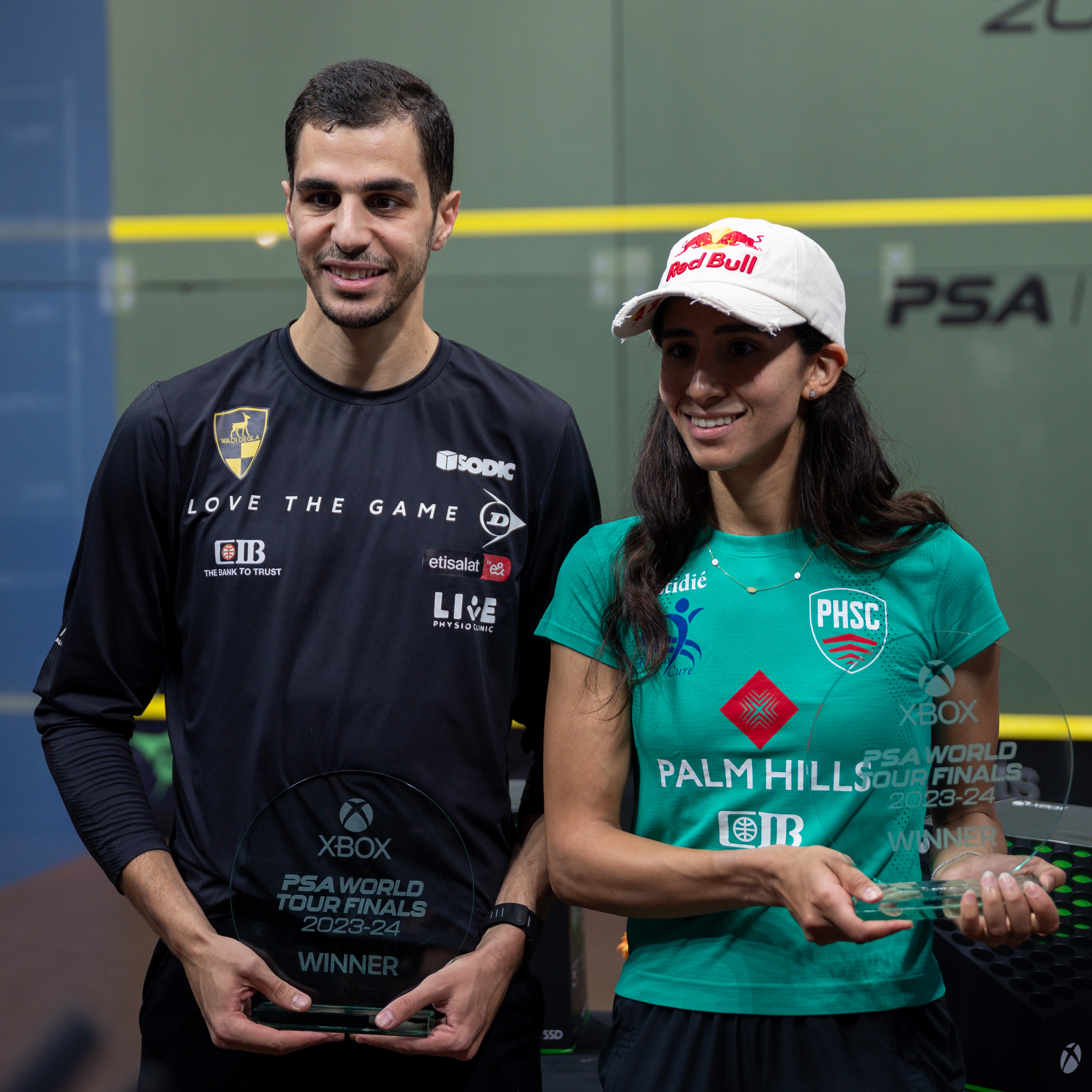
Ali Farag and Nouran Gohar with their winner’s trophies.

== PSA World Tour Ranking Points ==
PSA World Tour events also have a separate World Tour ranking. Points for this are calculated on a cumulative basis after each World Tour event. The top eight players at the end of the calendar year are then eligible to play in the PSA World Tour Finals.

Ranking points vary according to tournament tier being awarded as follows:

Tournament			Ranking Points
Rank	Prize Money US$	Ranking Points	Winner	Runner up	3/4	5/8	9/16	17/32	33/48
World Championship	$500,000	25045 points	3175	2090	1270	780	475	290	177.5
Platinum	$170,000–$300,000	19188 points	2750	1810	1100	675	410	250	152.5
Gold	$90,000–$110,500	10660 points	1750	1150	700	430	260	160
Silver	$70,000–$85,000	7470 points	1225	805	490	300	182.5	112.5
Bronze	$45,000–$55,000	5330 points	875	575	350	215	130	80

== Men's ==
=== Tournaments ===
Tournament	Country	Location	Rank	Prize money	Date	Winner
Windsor Cup	Canada	Windsor	Bronze	$52,500	15–19 August 2023	(Egypt) Tarek Momen
Paris Squash	France	Paris	Platinum	$190,000	27 August–2 September 2023	(Egypt) Ali Farag
QTerminals Qatar Classic	Qatar	Doha	Platinum	$187,500	9–16 September 2023	(Egypt) Ali Farag
U.S. Open	United States	Philadelphia	Platinum	$196,500	7–14 October 2023	(New Zealand) Paul Coll
Grasshopper Cup	Switzerland	Zürich	Gold	$110,500	17–22 October 2023	(Egypt) Karim Abdel Gawad
QSF No.4	Qatar	Doha	Bronze	$50,000	23–27 October 2023	(Qatar) Abdulla Al-Tamimi
ACE Malaysia Squash Cup	Malaysia	Seremban	Bronze	$51,500	6–10 November 2023	(Egypt) Karim Abdel Gawad
VITAGEN Singapore Squash Open	Singapore	Kallang	Gold	$112,500	14–19 November 2023	(Egypt) Ali Farag
Hong Kong Football Club Open	Hong Kong, China	Hong Kong	Bronze	$55,000	21–25 November 2023	(Egypt) Aly Abou Eleinen
TTI Milwaukee HK Open	Hong Kong, China	Hong Kong	Platinum	$190,000	27 November–3 December 2023	(New Zealand) Paul Coll
Lucino Vanities New Zealand Open	New Zealand	Mount Maunganui	Silver	$77,500	5–10 December 2023	(New Zealand) Paul Coll
SmartCentres Kinetic Florida Open	United States	Boynton Beach	Gold	$110,750	9–14 January 2024	(Egypt) Mostafa Asal
J.P. Morgan Tournament of Champions	United States	New York City	Platinum	$190,000	17–25 January 2024	(Egypt) Ali Farag
Sturbridge Capital Motor City Open	United States	Bloomfield Hills	Silver	$80,000	31 January–4 February 2024	(Peru) Diego Elías
Pittsburgh Open	United States	Pittsburgh	Silver	$75,800	7–11 February 2024	(Egypt) Karim Abdel Gawad
HSC Houston Men's Open	United States	Houston	Gold	$110,000	13–18 February 2024	(Egypt) Ali Farag
Squash on Fire Open	United States	Washington, D.C.	Bronze	$51,500	14–18 February 2024	(Egypt) Youssef Soliman
Windy City Open	United States	Chicago	Platinum	$250,000	21–28 February 2024	(Egypt) Ali Farag
Canadian Men's Open	Canada	Calgary	Silver	$78,000	3–7 March 2024	(Peru) Diego Elías
Squash In The Land	United States	Cleveland	Bronze	$51,250	5–10 March 2024	(Mexico) Leonel Cárdenas
OptAsia Championships	England	London	Gold	$110,000	12–17 March 2024	(New Zealand) Paul Coll
City Tattersalls Group Australian Open	Australia	Sydney	Bronze	$52,500	20–24 March 2024	(Egypt) Youssef Soliman
GillenMarkets London Squash Classic	England	London	Gold	$108,500	27 March–1 April 2024	(New Zealand) Paul Coll
German Open	Germany	Hamburg	Bronze	$50,000	3–7 April 2024	(Malaysia) Eain Yow
Black Ball Squash Open	Egypt	New Cairo	Gold	$108,500	11–16 April 2024	(Egypt) Mostafa Asal
El Gouna International	Egypt	El Gouna	Platinum	$175,000	19–26 April 2024	(Egypt) Ali Farag
PSA World Championships	Egypt	Cairo	W.C.	$565,000	9–18 May 2024	(Peru) Diego Elías
Manchester Open	England	Manchester	Silver	$75,000	22–26 May 2024	(Wales) Joel Makin
QSF No.3	Qatar	Doha	Bronze	$53,500	22–26 May 2024	(Egypt) Tarek Momen
British Open	England	Birmingham	Platinum	$194,500	2–9 June 2024	(Egypt) Mostafa Asal

=== Standings ===
World Championship
177.5	1st Round	290	2nd Round
475	3rd Round	780	Quarterfinalist
1270	Semifinalist	2090	Runner-up
**3175**	Winner		

Platinum
152.5	1st Round	250	2nd Round
410	3rd Round	675	Quarterfinalist
1100	Semifinalist	1810	Runner-up
**2750**	Winner		

Gold
160	1st Round	260	2nd Round
430	Quarterfinalist	700	Semifinalist
1150	Runner-up	**1750**	Winner

Silver
112.5	1st Round	182.5	2nd Round
300	Quarterfinalist	490	Semifinalist
805	Runner-up	**1225**	Winner

Bronze
80	1st Round	130	2nd Round
215	Quarterfinalist	350	Semifinalist
575	Runner-up	**875**	Winner

Top 16 Men's PSA World Tour Standings 2023–24
Rank	Player	Tournaments Played	CAN (Canada)	FRA (France)	QAT (Qatar)	USA (United States)	SUI (Switzerland)	QAT (Qatar)	MYS (Malaysia)	SGP (Singapore)	HKG (Hong Kong)	HKG (Hong Kong)	NZL (New Zealand)	USA (United States)	USA (United States)	USA (United States)	USA (United States)	USA (United States)	USA (United States)	USA (United States)	CAN (Canada)	USA (United States)	ENG (England)	AUS (Australia)	ENG (England)	GER (Germany)	EGY (Egypt)	EGY (Egypt)	EGY (Egypt)	ENG (England)	QAT (Qatar)	ENG (England)	Total Points
1	(Egypt) **Ali Farag**	13	DNP	**2750**	**2750**	1810	DNP	DNP	DNP	**1750**	DNP	1810	DNP	DNP	**2750**	DNP	DNP	**1750**	DNP	**2750**	DNP	DNP	1150	DNP	DNP	DNP	1150	**2750**	1270	DNP	DNP	1810	26250
2	(New Zealand) **Paul Coll**	14	DNP	1100	250	**2750**	DNP	DNP	DNP	430	DNP	**2750**	**1225**	DNP	675	805	DNP	DNP	DNP	1810	DNP	DNP	**1750**	DNP	**1750**	DNP	DNP	675	1270	DNP	DNP	1100	18340
3	(Egypt) **Mostafa Asal**	14	DNP	DNP	DNP	DNP	430	DNP	575	700	DNP	1100	DNP	**1750**	1100	DNP	DNP	430	DNP	1100	DNP	DNP	700	DNP	1150	DNP	**1750**	1810	2090	DNP	DNP	**2750**	17435
4	(Peru) **Diego Elías**	13	DNP	1810	1810	1100	DNP	DNP	DNP	1150	DNP	675	DNP	700	1810	**1225**	DNP	DNP	DNP	675	**1225**	DNP	DNP	DNP	DNP	DNP	DNP	675	**3175**	DNP	DNP	675	16705
5	(Egypt) **Karim Abdel Gawad**	15	DNP	250	675	250	**1750**	DNP	**875**	DNP	DNP	410	DNP	DNP	DNP	DNP	**1225**	700	DNP	675	DNP	DNP	700	DNP	430	DNP	700	1100	780	DNP	DNP	410	10930
6	(Egypt) **Mazen Hesham**	14	DNP	675	1100	675	260	DNP	DNP	DNP	DNP	675	DNP	1150	675	DNP	DNP	1150	DNP	1100	805	DNP	DNP	DNP	DNP	DNP	700	250	780	DNP	DNP	675	10670
7	(Egypt) **Tarek Momen**	15	**875**	675	675	1100	DNP	575	DNP	DNP	DNP	675	DNP	430	675	DNP	DNP	430	DNP	410	DNP	DNP	DNP	DNP	DNP	DNP	260	1100	780	DNP	**875**	250	9785
8	(England) **Mohd. El Shorbagy**	14	DNP	1100	675	675	430	DNP	DNP	430	DNP	1100	DNP	700	675	DNP	DNP	700	DNP	675	DNP	DNP	430	DNP	DNP	DNP	DNP	675	780	DNP	DNP	410	9455
9	(Wales) Joel Makin	13	DNP	675	1100	DNP	1150	DNP	DNP	DNP	DNP	DNP	490	430	DNP	DNP	DNP	DNP	DNP	DNP	DNP	DNP	430	DNP	700	350	260	250	475	**1225**	DNP	1100	8635
10	(England) Marw. El Shorbagy	16	DNP	410	250	675	700	DNP	DNP	700	DNP	675	805	DNP	410	DNP	805	DNP	DNP	DNP	DNP	DNP	430	DNP	430	130	DNP	410	475	182.5	DNP	410	7897.5
11	(Egypt) Youssef Soliman	16	575	250	410	410	DNP	DNP	DNP	430	DNP	410	DNP	DNP	250	DNP	490	DNP	**875**	250	490	DNP	DNP	**875**	DNP	DNP	DNP	410	475	300	DNP	410	7310
12	(France) Victor Crouin	15	DNP	675	410	250	DNP	350	215	DNP	DNP	410	490	DNP	1100	DNP	DNP	DNP	350	675	DNP	DNP	DNP	575	DNP	DNP	260	250	475	DNP	DNP	250	6735
13	(Egypt) Youssef Ibrahim	16	DNP	DNP	410	410	430	DNP	DNP	260	DNP	250	DNP	DNP	410	182.5	490	DNP	350	250	DNP	350	DNP	DNP	DNP	DNP	430	250	475	490	DNP	410	5847.5
14	(Malaysia) Eain Yow	15	DNP	250	250	DNP	DNP	DNP	350	260	575	250	DNP	DNP	250	DNP	DNP	DNP	DNP	152.5	DNP	215	DNP	DNP	260	**875**	DNP	250	475	DNP	575	675	5662.5
15	(Egypt) Aly Abou Eleinen	14	DNP	250	410	410	DNP	DNP	DNP	DNP	**875**	250	DNP	DNP	250	DNP	DNP	430	DNP	250	DNP	DNP	DNP	DNP	430	DNP	260	675	290	DNP	215	250	5245
16	(Scotland) Greg Lobban	14	215	410	675	250	260	DNP	DNP	DNP	DNP	152.5	DNP	DNP	250	DNP	DNP	DNP	215	250	DNP	350	DNP	DNP	DNP	DNP	DNP	410	290	805	DNP	250	4782.5

Bold – Players qualified for the final
(*) – Winners of Platinum's tournaments automatically qualifies for Finals.

Final tournament	Country	Location	Prize money	Date	2023–24 World Tour Champion
Men's PSA World Tour Finals	United States	Hidden Valley Fieldhouse, Bellevue	$224,500	18–22 June 2024	Ali Farag (EGY)

== Women's ==
=== Tournaments ===
Tournament	Country	Location	Rank	Prize money	Date	Winner
Paris Squash	France	Paris	Platinum	$190,000	27 August–2 September 2023	(Egypt) Nour El Sherbini
QTerminals Qatar Classic	Qatar	Doha	Platinum	$187,500	9–16 September 2023	(Egypt) Hania El Hammamy
South Western Open	United States	Houston	Gold	$110,000	27 September–1 October 2023	(Egypt) Nour El Tayeb
U.S. Open	United States	Philadelphia	Platinum	$196,500	7–14 October 2023	(Egypt) Nour El Sherbini
Grasshopper Cup	Switzerland	Zürich	Gold	$110,500	17–22 October 2023	(Egypt) Nour El Sherbini
ACE Malaysia Squash Cup	Malaysia	Seremban	Bronze	$51,500	6–10 November 2023	(Egypt) Nour El Tayeb
VITAGEN Singapore Squash Open	Singapore	Kallang	Gold	$112,500	14–19 November 2023	(Belgium) Nele Gilis
Hong Kong Football Club Open	Hong Kong, China	Hong Kong	Bronze	$55,000	21–25 November 2023	(Malaysia) Sivasangari Subramaniam
TTI Milwaukee HK Open	Hong Kong, China	Hong Kong	Platinum	$190,000	27 November–3 December 2023	(Egypt) Hania El Hammamy
Barfoot & Thompson New Zealand Open	New Zealand	Mount Maunganui	Silver	$77,500	5–10 December 2023	(Belgium) Nele Gilis
SmartCentres Kinetic Florida Open	United States	Boynton Beach	Gold	$110,750	9–14 January 2024	(Egypt) Nour El Sherbini
J.P. Morgan Tournament of Champions	United States	New York City	Platinum	$190,000	17–25 January 2024	(Egypt) Nour El Sherbini
Carol Weymuller Open	United States	New York City	Bronze	$51,250	25–29 January 2024	(Egypt) Farida Mohamed
Bahl & Gaynor Cincinnati Cup	United States	Cincinnati	Silver	$75,000	31 January–4 February 2024	(United States) Olivia Weaver
DAC Pro Squash Classic	United States	Detroit	Silver	$82,500	6–10 February 2024	(United States) Olivia Weaver
Squash on Fire Open	United States	Washington, D.C.	Bronze	$51,500	14–18 February 2024	(Egypt) Amina Orfi
Windy City Open	United States	Chicago	Platinum	$250,000	21–28 February 2024	(Egypt) Nour El Sherbini
Squash In The Land	United States	Cleveland	Silver	$75,000	5–10 March 2024	(Egypt) Nour El Tayeb
OptAsia Championships	England	London	Bronze	$57,500	12–17 March 2024	(Japan) Satomi Watanabe
City Tattersalls Group Australian Open	Australia	Sydney	Bronze	$52,500	20–24 March 2024	(Egypt) Salma Hany
GillenMarkets London Squash Classic	England	London	Gold	$108,500	27 March–1 April 2024	(Malaysia) Sivasangari Subramaniam
German Open	Germany	Hamburg	Bronze	$50,000	3–7 April 2024	(England) Georgina Kennedy
Black Ball Squash Open	Egypt	New Cairo	Gold	$108,500	11–16 April 2024	(Egypt) Nouran Gohar
El Gouna International	Egypt	El Gouna	Platinum	$175,000	19–26 April 2024	(Egypt) Nouran Gohar
PSA World Championships	Egypt	Cairo	W.C.	$565,000	9–18 May 2024	(Egypt) Nouran Gohar
Manchester Open	England	Manchester	Silver	$75,000	22–26 May 2024	(England) Georgina Kennedy
British Open	England	Birmingham	Platinum	$194,500	2–9 June 2024	(Egypt) Nouran Gohar

=== Standings ===
World Championship
177.5	1st Round	290	2nd Round
475	3rd Round	780	Quarterfinalist
1270	Semifinalist	2090	Runner-up
**3175**	Winner		

Platinum
152.5	1st Round	250	2nd Round
410	3rd Round	675	Quarterfinalist
1100	Semifinalist	1810	Runner-up
**2750**	Winner		

Gold
160	1st Round	260	2nd Round
430	Quarterfinalist	700	Semifinalist
1150	Runner-up	**1750**	Winner

Silver
112.5	1st Round	182.5	2nd Round
300	Quarterfinalist	490	Semifinalist
805	Runner-up	**1225**	Winner

Bronze
80	1st Round	130	2nd Round
215	Quarterfinalist	350	Semifinalist
575	Runner-up	**875**	Winner

Top 16 Women's World Tour Standings 2023–24
Rank	Player	Tournaments Played	FRA (France)	QAT (Qatar)	USA (United States)	USA (United States)	SUI (Switzerland)	MYS (Malaysia)	SGP (Singapore)	HKG (Hong Kong)	HKG (Hong Kong)	NZL (New Zealand)	USA (United States)	USA (United States)	USA (United States)	USA (United States)	USA (United States)	USA (United States)	USA (United States)	USA (United States)	ENG (England)	AUS (Australia)	ENG (England)	GER (Germany)	EGY (Egypt)	EGY (Egypt)	EGY (Egypt)	ENG (England)	ENG (England)	Total Points
1	(Egypt) **Nour El Sherbini**	12	**2750**	1810	DNP	**2750**	**1750**	DNP	DNP	DNP	1100	DNP	**1750**	**2750**	DNP	DNP	DNP	DNP	**2750**	DNP	DNP	DNP	430	DNP	DNP	1810	2090	DNP	1810	23550
2	(Egypt) **Nouran Gohar**	11	1810	675	DNP	DNP	DNP	DNP	DNP	DNP	DNP	DNP	700	1810	DNP	DNP	490	DNP	1810	DNP	DNP	DNP	700	DNP	**1750**	**2750**	**3175**	DNP	**2750**	18420
3	(Egypt) **Hania El Hammamy**	11	410	**2750**	DNP	1810	1150	DNP	DNP	DNP	**2750**	DNP	1150	1100	DNP	DNP	DNP	DNP	1100	DNP	DNP	DNP	1150	DNP	DNP	DNP	1270	DNP	1100	15740
4	(United States) **Olivia Weaver**	16	410	410	430	1100	DNP	DNP	DNP	DNP	250	DNP	700	675	350	**1225**	**1225**	DNP	675	490	DNP	DNP	DNP	DNP	1150	675	1270	DNP	675	11710
5	(England) **Georgina Kennedy**	15	1100	675	DNP	675	700	DNP	700	350	DNP	DNP	DNP	250	DNP	490	DNP	DNP	1100	805	DNP	DNP	430	**875**	DNP	1100	475	**1225**	675	11625
6	(Belgium) **Nele Gilis**	15	675	675	DNP	675	700	DNP	**1750**	DNP	1100	**1225**	DNP	410	DNP	DNP	DNP	DNP	675	DNP	575	DNP	700	575	DNP	410	475	DNP	410	11030
7	(Egypt) **Nour El Tayeb**	14	675	250	**1750**	675	DNP	**875**	260	DNP	DNP	DNP	DNP	675	DNP	DNP	DNP	DNP	250	**1225**	DNP	DNP	DNP	DNP	700	675	780	805	1100	10695
8	(Belgium) **Tinne Gilis**	15	250	1100	DNP	410	DNP	DNP	1150	DNP	675	805	DNP	410	DNP	805	DNP	575	675	DNP	DNP	DNP	DNP	215	700	1100	780	DNP	675	10325
9	(Egypt) Salma Hany	16	410	675	700	410	DNP	DNP	430	DNP	410	DNP	DNP	410	350	DNP	DNP	DNP	410	DNP	DNP	**875**	DNP	350	430	675	475	490	675	8175
10	(Egypt) Rowan Elaraby	15	250	410	DNP	410	430	DNP	430	DNP	675	DNP	DNP	1100	DNP	490	805	DNP	410	DNP	DNP	DNP	DNP	DNP	430	675	780	490	250	8035
11	(Malaysia) Sivasangari Subramaniam	15	DNP	410	DNP	250	DNP	350	430	**875**	675	DNP	430	250	DNP	300	DNP	DNP	410	490	DNP	DNP	**1750**	DNP	DNP	250	475	DNP	250	7595
12	(Egypt) Amina Orfi	14	250	410	DNP	675	DNP	215	DNP	575	410	DNP	430	675	DNP	DNP	DNP	**875**	410	DNP	DNP	575	DNP	DNP	260	410	475	DNP	DNP	6645
13	(United States) Amanda Sobhy	5	1100	1100	1150	1100	DNP	DNP	DNP	DNP	1810	DNP	DNP	DNP	DNP	DNP	DNP	DNP	DNP	DNP	DNP	DNP	DNP	DNP	DNP	DNP	DNP	DNP	DNP	6260
14	(England) Sarah-Jane Perry	17	250	410	DNP	250	430	DNP	700	350	410	DNP	DNP	250	215	182.5	DNP	DNP	250	DNP	215	DNP	430	DNP	DNP	410	475	182.5	410	5820
15	(Egypt) Fayrouz Aboelkheir	16	250	250	DNP	152.5	260	DNP	DNP	130	152.5	DNP	DNP	675	575	300	DNP	DNP	250	DNP	DNP	DNP	430	215	260	250	780	DNP	410	5340
16	(United States) Sabrina Sobhy	13	675	250	DNP	250	430	DNP	430	215	250	DNP	DNP	410	DNP	DNP	DNP	350	675	DNP	DNP	DNP	DNP	DNP	DNP	DNP	475	300	410	5120

Bold – Players qualified for the final
(*) – Winners of Platinum's tournaments automatically qualifies for Finals.

Final tournament	Country	Location	Prize money	Date	2023–24 World Tour Champion
Women's PSA World Tour Finals	United States	Hidden Valley Fieldhouse, Bellevue	$224,500	18–22 June 2024	(Egypt) Nouran Gohar

== See also ==
- 2023–24 PSA World Tour
- Official Men's Squash World Ranking
- Official Women's Squash World Ranking
