= Dixon Hill =

Dixon Hill may refer to:

- Dixon Hill (Star Trek), a metafictional detective in Star Trek
- Dixon Hill, a settlement on San Salvador Island, the Bahamas
- Dixon Hill, a neighborhood of Mount Washington, Baltimore
