= 2024 World Squash Championships =

2024 World Squash Championships may refer to:

- 2024 PSA Men's World Squash Championship
- 2024 PSA Women's World Squash Championship
