= Vivienne Sze =

American electrical engineer and computer scientist

Vivienne Sze is an American electrical engineer and computer scientist whose research focuses on low-power electronics and on the trade-offs between energy use and computing power in the combined design of software and hardware, for applications including video coding and deep neural networks. She is an associate professor in the Massachusetts Institute of Technology (MIT) Department of Electrical Engineering and Computer Science, where she heads the Energy-Efficient Multimedia Systems Group.

== Education and career ==
Sze did her undergraduate studies in electrical engineering at the University of Toronto, graduating in 2004. She was a student of Anantha P. Chandrakasan at MIT, where she earned a master's degree in 2006 and completed her Ph.D. in 2010; her doctoral research won MIT's Jin-Au Kong Outstanding Doctoral Thesis Prize in electrical engineering.

After completing her doctorate, she worked on video coding at Texas Instruments. She became a member of the Joint Collaborative Team on Video Coding (JCT-VC), which developed the standard for High Efficiency Video Coding (HEVC). After completing her work on HEVC, she returned to MIT as a faculty member in 2013.

== Books ==
With Madhukar Budagavi and Gary J. Sullivan, Sze edited the book High Efficiency Video Coding (HEVC): Algorithms and Architectures (Springer, 2014). With Yu-Hsin Chen, Tien-Ju Yang, and Joel S. Emer, she is a coauthor of Efficient Processing of Deep Neural Networks (Morgan & Claypool, 2020).

== Recognition ==
As part of the JCT-VC, Sze and her collaborators won a 2017 Primetime Engineering Emmy Award for their work on HEVC. In 2020 she became the inaugural winner of the Rising Star Award of ACM-W, the Council on Women in Computing of the Association for Computing Machinery.
