= Aly Hussein =

Egyptian squash player (born 2000)

Personal information
- Born: 25 March 2000 (age 26) Cairo, Egypt

Sport
- Country: Egypt
- Turned pro: 2018
- Retired: Active
- Racquet used: Tecnifibre

Men's singles
- Highest ranking: No. 57 (February 2024)
- Current ranking: No. 57 (February 2024)
- Updated on February 2024

Aly Hussein (born 25 March 2000 in Cairo) is an Egyptian professional squash player. His career-best ranking so far has been World No. 57, achieved on 12 February 2024.
