= Ahmed Abdel Khalek =

Egyptian intelligence officer

Ahmed Abdel Khalek, also spelled Ahmed Abdelkhaliq (Arabic: أحمد عبد الخالق), is an Egyptian intelligence officer. He is one of the Egyptian General Intelligence Service's most prominent officers dealing with the Palestinian question.

== Biography ==
Early in his career, Abdel Khalek served as a military attaché at the Egyptian embassy in Gaza. Abdel Khalek was a member of the Egyptian security delegation participating in negotiations surrounding the Israeli disengagement from Gaza in 2006 and subsequent Fatah–Hamas conflict. Abdel Khalek also placed a significant role in the Gilad Shalit prisoner exchange in 2011, according to Egyptian media.

Abdel Khalek, then a major general, was appointed as the Egyptian General Intelligence Service's (EGIS) chief of Palestinian affairs in July 2018, one week after Abbas Kamel's appointment as EGIS Director. The appointment of Abdel-Khalek to replace Sameh Nabil in the role came after Nabil failed to successfully achieve reconciliation between Hamas and the Palestinian Authority. According to Palestinian news agency Donia al-Watan, Abdel Khalek was EGIS's most prominent figure regarding the Palestinian question and was considered the founder of the agency's Palestinian file.

After a flare-up of violence between Palestinian factions such as Hamas, Palestinian Islamic Jihad (PIJ) and Israel in October 2018, Abdel Khalek led a delegation to the Gaza Strip to broker a truce. According to the Ma'an News Agency, Abdel Khalek convinced Palestinian armed factions to cease firing rockets into Israel.

He made his first official visit beginning on November 15, 2018, attending a funeral for slain Hamas fighters from the Izz ad-Din al-Qassam Brigades. At the event, Abdel Khalek greeted Hamas's political and military leaders, including Yahya Sinwar. Al-Monitor described Abdel Khalek's brief appearance at a Hamas as an unprecedented gesture by an Egyptian official.

Abdel Khalek conducted shuttle diplomacy between Hamas and Israel to broker negotiations on a proposed prisoner swap in December 2020, which would have been the first such exchange since the Gilad Shalit prisoner exchange in 2011.

After tensions between Hamas and Egypt rose following Hamas leader Ismail Haniyeh's visit to Iran for the funeral of Quds Force chief Qasem Soleimani, Abdel Khalek led an EGIS delegation to the Gaza Strip in February 2020, the first visit in 5 months.

=== Gaza war ===
Abdel Khalek gained international attention during the Gaza war for changing the terms of a May 2024 ceasefire proposal, adding new demands for Hamas after Israel had signed. Reports indicated he gave Hamas and Israel different versions of the agreement.
