= Michael Mehl =

Canadian squash player and coach

Personal information
- Born: February 5, 1999 (age 27) Calgary, Alberta, Canada
- Education: University of Pennsylvania

Sport
- Country: Canada
- Handedness: Right Handed
- Coached by: Jonathan Hill, Gilly Lane
- Retired: Active
- Racquet used: Head

Men's singles
- Highest ranking: No. 309 (July 2015)
- Updated on February 2020

Michael Mehl (born 5 February 1999) is a Canadian squash player and coach. He reached a career high ranking of 309th in the world in July 2015.
