= Aly Abou Eleinen =

Egyptian squash player (born 2000)

Personal information
- Born: 1 January 2000 (age 26) Alexandria, Egypt

Sport
- Country: Egypt
- Turned pro: 2019
- Retired: Active

Men's singles
- Highest ranking: No. 8 (4 August 2025)
- Current ranking: No. 8 (4 August 2025)
- Title: 2
- Tour final: 4

Aly Abou Eleinen (born 1 January 2000) is an Egyptian professional squash player. He reached a career high ranking of 10 in the world during May 2025. He won the 2022 Bremer Schlüssel and the 2022 London Open.
