= Canadian Junior Open Squash =

Annual Junior squash championship in Ontario, Canada

Canadian Junior Open

Details
- Event name: Canadian Junior Open
- Location: (Canada) Niagara-on-the-Lake, Ontario
- Venue: The Club at White Oaks
- Website

Men's Winner
- Most recent champion(s): (Mexico) Juan Sebastian Salazar Gomez

Women's Winner
- Most recent champion(s): (United States) Lucie Stefanoni

The Canadian Junior Open is a yearly Junior squash championship held in Niagara-on-the-Lake, Ontario, Canada. The tournament hosts nearly 300 players representing between 20 and 25 countries every year. The tournament is organized by Squash Canada and Squash Ontario.

The Canadian Junior Open is divided into eight categories — Boys Under-19, Boys Under-17, Boys Under-15, Boys Under-13, Girls Under-19, Girls Under-17, Girls Under-15 and Girls Under-13.

== List of winners by category (Boys) ==
| Year | Under-13 | Under-15 | Under-17 | Under-19 |
|---|---|---|---|---|
| 1996 | (United States) Colby Smith | Quebec Shawn Delierre | Quebec David Phillips | Ontario Shahier Razik |
| 1997 | unknown | unknown | unknown | unknown |
| 1998 | unknown | unknown | unknown | unknown |
| 1999 | unknown | unknown | unknown | unknown |
| 2000 | (Mexico) Arturo Salazar | (Australia) Ben Reece | (Australia) Jhie Gough | unknown |
| 2001 | Alberta David Letorneau | (Mexico) Arturo Salazar | (Mexico) Mauricio Sanchez | Newfoundland and Labrador Dylan Bennett |
| 2002 | unknown | (Mexico) Arturo Salazar | (Australia) Ben Reece | (Mexico) Mauricio Sanchez |
| 2003 | Ontario Brian Hong | Alberta David Letorneau | Manitoba [Andrew Boumford] | (Colombia) Miguel Ángel Rodríguez |
| 2004 | unknown | Alberta Kelly Shannon | Alberta Keith Pritchard | (Colombia) Miguel Ángel Rodríguez |
| 2005 | Ontario Jamie Baker | Ontario Brian Hong | (Malaysia) Kamran Khan | Ontario Colin West |
| 2006 | unknown | unknown | unknown | (Mexico) Arturo Salazar |
| 2007 | (Mexico) Edgar Zayas | Ontario Tyler Osborne | Ontario Brian Hong | Alberta Kelly Shannon |
| 2008 | Ontario Joshua Sekhar | unknown | unknown | unknown |
| 2009 | (Mexico) Guillermo Cortez Ortiz | (Mexico) Edgar Zayas | Ontario Tyler Osborne | Alberta Andrew Schnell |
| 2010 | unknown | unknown | unknown | Ontario Tyler Osborne |
| 2011 | Ontario Ravi Seth | (United States) Bransten Ming | (Mexico) Edgar Zayas | (Mexico) Mario Yanez |
| 2012 | (Guatemala) Alejandro Enríquez | (Mexico) Jesus Camacho | (Peru) Diego Elías | (Mexico) Edgar Zayas |
| 2013 | Ontario Nathan Mead | Ontario Akasham Rajagopaul | Ontario Mohammad Al-Saraj | (England) Lyell Fuller |
| 2014 | Alberta Abdelrahman Dweek | (Mexico) Carlos Ayala | Alberta Michael Mehl | Quebec David Baillargeon |
| 2015 | (England) Jack Bloomfield | Alberta Abdelrahman Dweek | (Mexico) Leonel Cárdenas | British Columbia Matthew Henderson |
| 2016 | (Mexico) Federico Sosa | Alberta Abdelrahman Dweek | Ontario James Flynn | Ontario Akasham Rajagopaul |
| 2017 | (United States) Andrew Glaser | (Ecuador) David Costales | Ontario Asser Ibrahim | (Colombia) Matías Knudsen |
| 2018 | Ontario Youssef Salem | (Mexico) Federico Sosa | (Ecuador) David Costales | (Mexico) Leonardo Vargas |
| 2019 | Ontario Abdullah Mahfouz | (Colombia) Juan José Torres | British Columbia Gabrial Yun | (Mexico) Juan S. S. Gomez |

=== Boys' champions by country ===
| Country | U-13 | U-15 | U-17 | U-19 | Total |
|---|---|---|---|---|---|
| France | 3 | 5 | 5 | 10 | 23 |
| Egypt | 7 | 5 | 4 | 2 | 18 |
| England | 3 | 5 | 5 | 4 | 17 |
| Netherlands | 3 | 0 | 2 | 2 | 7 |
| Switzerland | 1 | 1 | 1 | 3 | 6 |
| Czech Republic | 2 | 1 | 1 | 2 | 6 |
| Germany | 0 | 3 | 2 | 0 | 5 |
| Ireland | 0 | 1 | 2 | 0 | 3 |
| Finland | 1 | 0 | 0 | 1 | 2 |
| India | 0 | 1 | 1 | 0 | 2 |
| Spain | 0 | 1 | 1 | 0 | 2 |
| Denmark | 1 | 1 | 0 | 0 | 2 |
| Italy | 0 | 0 | 0 | 1 | 1 |
| Malaysia | 0 | 0 | 1 | 0 | 1 |
| Pakistan | 0 | 1 | 0 | 0 | 1 |
| Israel | 1 | 0 | 0 | 0 | 1 |

== List of winners by category (Girls) ==
| Year | Under-13 | Under-15 | Under-17 | Under-19 |
|---|---|---|---|---|
| 1994 | Did not play | (Spain) Elisabet Sado | (Belgium) Kim Hannes | (France) Isabelle Stoehr |
| 1995 | Did not play | (Belgium) Tine Hannes | (Netherlands) Aurelia Eneide | (Switzerland) Gaby Hegy |
| 1996 | Did not play | (Germany) Katrin Rohrmuller | (Germany) Natacha Serjan | (England) Kate Allisson |
| 1997 | Did not play | (England) Laura Lengthorn | (Switzerland) Olivia Hauser | (Slovenia) Petra Vihar |
| 1998 | Did not play | (Egypt) Essam Ghada | (Switzerland) Olivia Hauser | (Belgium) Katline Cauwels |
| 1999 | (France) Célia Allamargot | (Spain) Margaux Moros | (Egypt) Omneya Abdel Kawy | (Egypt) Engy Kheirallah |
| 2000 | (Spain) Chantal Moros | (Netherlands) Orla Noom | (Netherlands) Milja Dorenbos | (England) Dominique Lloyd-Walter |
| 2001 | (Czech Republic) Lucie Fialová | (England) Jenna Gates | (Spain) Margaux Moros | (Switzerland) Manuela Zehnder |
| 2002 | (France) Camille Serme | (Spain) Chantal Moros | (England) Emma Beddoes | (Switzerland) Manuela Zehnder |
| 2003 | (Wales) Natalie Pritchard | (France) Camille Serme | (Belgium) Liesbeth Voorstmans | (Belgium) Charlie De Rycke |
| 2004 | (Scotland) Robyn Hogson | (Germany) Sina Wall | (Hong Kong) Ka Kei Chiu | (Spain) Margaux Moros |
| 2005 | (France) Mélissa Alves | (India) Dipika Pallikal | (Czech Republic) Tereza Dufkova | (France) Célia Allamargot |
| 2006 | (Germany) Caroline Sayegh | (Czech Republic) Anna Klimundová | (Germany) Sina Wall | (France) Camille Serme |
| 2007 | (Egypt) Haidi Lala | (Egypt) Farida Abouldahab | (France) Emilie Lamilango | (France) Camille Serme |
| 2008 | (England) Martha Posseger | (France) Mélissa Alves | (France) Cyrielle Peltier | (England) Victoria Lust |
| 2009 | (France) Marion Andriamifidy | (France) Elvira Bedjai | (France) Mélissa Alves | (Netherlands) Milou van der Heijden |
| 2010 | (Egypt) Nadine Shahien | (Egypt) Salma El Defrawy | (France) Mélissa Alves | (England) Millie Tomlinson |
| 2011 | (Wales) Elin Harlow | (France) Marion Andriamifidy | (England) Victoria Temple-Murray | (England) Emily Whitlock |
| 2012 | (Egypt) Perein Abou Seada | (Belgium) Tinne Gilis | (Finland) Emilia Soini | (France) Julia Lecoq |
| 2013 | (Wales) Ciara Richards | (Egypt) Nada Ehab Aly | (Wales) Elin Harlow | (England) Lucy Beecroft |
| 2014 | (England) Eve Coxon | (Egypt) Engy Hamouda | (Wales) Elin Harlow | (France) Marie Stephan |
| 2015 | (United States) Marina Stefanoni | (Ukraine) Alina Bushma | (Ukraine) Nadiia Usenko | (England) Lucy Beecroft |
| 2016 | (Egypt) Jana Metwaly Easa | (England) Alice Green | (England) Elise Lazarus | (Spain) Cristina Gómez |
| 2017 | (England) Torrie Malik | (England) Amber Copley | (Poland) Karina Tyma | (Republic of Ireland) Hannah Craig |
| 2018 | (England) Amelie Haworth | (England) Torrie Malik | (Denmark) Klara Møller | (Poland) Karina Tyma |

=== Girls' champions by country ===
| Country | U-13 | U-15 | U-17 | U-19 | Total |
|---|---|---|---|---|---|
| England | 4 | 5 | 3 | 7 | 19 |
| France | 4 | 4 | 4 | 6 | 18 |
| Egypt | 4 | 5 | 1 | 1 | 11 |
| Spain | 1 | 3 | 1 | 2 | 7 |
| Belgium | 0 | 2 | 2 | 2 | 6 |
| Switzerland | 0 | 0 | 2 | 3 | 5 |
| Germany | 1 | 2 | 2 | 0 | 5 |
| Wales | 3 | 0 | 2 | 0 | 5 |
| Netherlands | 0 | 1 | 2 | 1 | 4 |
| Czech Republic | 1 | 1 | 1 | 0 | 3 |
| Poland | 1 | 0 | 1 | 1 | 2 |
| Ukraine | 0 | 1 | 1 | 0 | 2 |
| Slovenia | 0 | 0 | 0 | 1 | 1 |
| Ireland | 0 | 0 | 0 | 1 | 1 |
| Finland | 0 | 0 | 1 | 0 | 1 |
| Hong Kong | 0 | 0 | 1 | 0 | 1 |
| Denmark | 0 | 0 | 1 | 0 | 1 |
| India | 0 | 1 | 0 | 0 | 1 |
| Scotland | 1 | 0 | 0 | 0 | 1 |
| United States | 1 | 0 | 0 | 0 | 1 |

== See also ==
- World Junior Squash Circuit
- World Junior Squash Championships
- British Junior Open Squash
- Dutch Junior Open Squash
- US Junior Open squash championship
- European Squash Federation
- French Squash Federation
