= French Junior Open Squash =

French Junior Open

Details
- Event name: French Junior Open
- Location: France, Lille
- Venue: WAM Club; Squash l'Arbonnoise; Club de Bondues
- Website www.frenchjunioropen.fr/

Men's Winner
- Most recent champion(s): (France) Benjamin Aubert

Women's Winner
- Most recent champion(s): (Spain) Cristina Gómez

French Junior Open squash championship is considered one of the most prestigious junior open squash championships in Europe and in the world. The tournament hosts nearly 300 players representing between 20 and 25 countries every year. The tournament is organized by the European Squash Federation and the French Squash Federation.

French Junior Open is divided into eight categories — Boys Under-19, Boys Under-17, Boys Under-15, Boys Under-13, Girls Under-19, Girls Under-17, Girls Under-15 and Girls Under-13.

== List of winners by category (Boys) ==
Year	Under-13	Under-15	Under-17	Under-19
1994	(France) Grégory Gaultier	(Spain) Alberto Manso	(Germany) Stefan Oppolzer	(France) Thierry Lincou
1995	(Switzerland) Marco Dätwyler	(France) Grégory Gaultier	(Germany) Ruben Glatt	(Italy) Davide Bianchetti
1996	Did not play	(France) Grégory Gaultier	(England) Michael Knight	(Switzerland) Lars Harms
1997	Did not play	(Czech Republic) Jan Koukal	(France) Grégory Gaultier	(Netherlands) Tommy Berden
1998	Did not play	(Germany) Patrick Gassler	(Malaysia) Mohd Azlan Iskandar	(Finland) Olli Tuominen
1999	(Egypt) Ramy Ashour	(Egypt) Omar Refaat	(Spain) Borja Golán	(Egypt) Wael El Hindi
2000	(Netherlands) Tom Hoevennars	(Germany) Tobias Bohm	(Switzerland) Marco Dätwyler	(France) Grégory Gaultier
2001	(Netherlands) Bastiaan Meulenbelt	(Germany) Mathias Maierhoffer	(Netherlands) Dylan Bennett	(Czech Republic) Jan Koukal
2002	(Czech Republic) Petr Martin	(France) Christophe Andre	(France) Yann Perrin	(Switzerland) Marco Dätwyler
2003	(Egypt) Ahmed El Mehelmy	(Pakistan) Adil Maqbool	(Netherlands) Tom Hoevenaars	(Netherlands) Dylan Bennett
2004	(Denmark) Phillip Tran	(Switzerland) Nicolas Müller	(France) Christophe Andre	(Egypt) Tarek Momen
2005	(England) Nicholas Hopcroft	(France) Grégoire Marche	(Egypt) Omar Tarek Mahmoud	(France) Mathieu Castagnet
2006	(France) Samuel Roche	(Denmark) Phillip Tran	(France) Grégoire Marche	(France) Thibault Gouti
2007	(Egypt) Mazen Hesham Ga Sabry	(England) James Earles	(Egypt) Andrew Wagih Shoukry	(Switzerland) Nicolas Müller
2008	(Israel) Daniel Poleshchuk	(England) Ollie Holland	(India) Aditya Jagtap	(England) Adrian Waller
2009	(Czech Republic) Jan Ryba	(Egypt) Ahmed Abdel Latif	(Egypt) Mohamed El Sherif	(France) Grégoire Marche
2010	(Finland) Miko Äijänen	(Egypt) Osama Khalifa	(Egypt) Moustafa Bayoumy	(France) Lucas Serme
2011	(France) Jules Cremoux	(Republic of Ireland) David Ryan	(England) Ollie Holland	(France) Lucas Serme
2012	(Egypt) Mostafa Montaser	(Egypt) Blal Nawar	(England) George Parker	(England) Ollie Holland
2013	(Egypt) Mostafa El Serty	(India) Adhitya Raghavan	(Republic of Ireland) David Ryan	(England) Richie Fallows
2014	(England) Jared Carter	(France) Victor Crouin	(France) Benjamin Aubert	(England) Angus Gillams
2015	(Egypt) Mohamed Ismael	(Egypt) Mostafa El Serty	(England) Robbie Keefe	(France) Benjamin Aubert
2016	(England) Alhassan Khalil	(England) Jared Carter	(England) Nick Wall	(France) Benjamin Aubert
2017	(Netherlands) Rowan Damming	(England) Adam Goad	(Czech Republic) Viktor Byrtus	(Czech Republic) David Zeman
2018	(Egypt) Yassin Emara	(England) Franklyn Smith	(Republic of Ireland) Conor Moran	(France) Victor Crouin
2019	(England) Alexander Broadbridge	(Netherlands) Samuel Gerrits	(Czech Republic) Marek Panacek	(Czech Republic) Viktor Byrtus
2020	(Egypt) Ahmed Abdelreheem	(France) Melvil Scianimanico	(France) Maceo Levy	(India) Yash Fadte

=== Boys' champions by country ===
Country	U-13	U-15	U-17	U-19	Total
France	3	5	5	10	23
Egypt	7	5	4	2	18
England	3	5	5	4	17
Netherlands	3	0	2	2	7
Switzerland	1	1	1	3	6
Czech Republic	2	1	1	2	6
Germany	0	3	2	0	5
Ireland	0	1	2	0	3
Finland	1	0	0	1	2
India	0	1	1	0	2
Spain	0	1	1	0	2
Denmark	1	1	0	0	2
Italy	0	0	0	1	1
Malaysia	0	0	1	0	1
Pakistan	0	1	0	0	1
Israel	1	0	0	0	1

== List of winners by category (Girls) ==
Year	Under-13	Under-15	Under-17	Under-19
1994	Did not play	(Spain) Elisabet Sado	(Belgium) Kim Hannes	(France) Isabelle Stoehr
1995	Did not play	(Belgium) Tine Hannes	(Netherlands) Aurelia Eneide	(Switzerland) Gaby Hegy
1996	Did not play	(Germany) Katrin Rohrmuller	(Germany) Natacha Serjan	(England) Kate Allisson
1997	Did not play	(England) Laura Lengthorn	(Switzerland) Olivia Hauser	(Slovenia) Petra Vihar
1998	Did not play	(Egypt) Essam Ghada	(Switzerland) Olivia Hauser	(Belgium) Katline Cauwels
1999	(France) Célia Allamargot	(Spain) Margaux Moros	(Egypt) Omneya Abdel Kawy	(Egypt) Engy Kheirallah
2000	(Spain) Chantal Moros	(Netherlands) Orla Noom	(Netherlands) Milja Dorenbos	(England) Dominique Lloyd-Walter
2001	(Czech Republic) Lucie Fialová	(England) Jenna Gates	(Spain) Margaux Moros	(Switzerland) Manuela Zehnder
2002	(France) Camille Serme	(Spain) Chantal Moros	(England) Emma Beddoes	(Switzerland) Manuela Zehnder
2003	(Wales) Natalie Pritchard	(France) Camille Serme	(Belgium) Liesbeth Voorstmans	(Belgium) Charlie De Rycke
2004	(Scotland) Robyn Hogson	(Germany) Sina Wall	(Hong Kong) Ka Kei Chiu	(Spain) Margaux Moros
2005	(France) Mélissa Alves	(India) Dipika Pallikal	(Czech Republic) Tereza Dufkova	(France) Célia Allamargot
2006	(Germany) Caroline Sayegh	(Czech Republic) Anna Klimundová	(Germany) Sina Wall	(France) Camille Serme
2007	(Egypt) Haidi Lala	(Egypt) Farida Abouldahab	(France) Emilie Lamilango	(France) Camille Serme
2008	(England) Martha Posseger	(France) Mélissa Alves	(France) Cyrielle Peltier	(England) Victoria Lust
2009	(France) Marion Andriamifidy	(France) Elvira Bedjai	(France) Mélissa Alves	(Netherlands) Milou van der Heijden
2010	(Egypt) Nadine Shahien	(Egypt) Salma El Defrawy	(France) Mélissa Alves	(England) Millie Tomlinson
2011	(Wales) Elin Harlow	(France) Marion Andriamifidy	(England) Victoria Temple-Murray	(England) Emily Whitlock
2012	(Egypt) Perein Abou Seada	(Belgium) Tinne Gilis	(Finland) Emilia Soini	(France) Julia Lecoq
2013	(Wales) Ciara Richards	(Egypt) Nada Ehab Aly	(Wales) Elin Harlow	(England) Lucy Beecroft
2014	(England) Eve Coxon	(Egypt) Engy Hamouda	(Wales) Elin Harlow	(France) Marie Stephan
2015	(United States) Marina Stefanoni	(Ukraine) Alina Bushma	(Ukraine) Nadiia Usenko	(England) Lucy Beecroft
2016	(Egypt) Jana Metwaly Easa	(England) Alice Green	(England) Elise Lazarus	(Spain) Cristina Gómez
2017	(England) Torrie Malik	(England) Amber Copley	(Poland) Karina Tyma	(Republic of Ireland) Hannah Craig
2018	(England) Amelie Haworth	(England) Torrie Malik	(Denmark) Klara Møller	(Poland) Karina Tyma

=== Girls' champions by country ===
Country	U-13	U-15	U-17	U-19	Total
England	4	5	3	7	19
France	4	4	4	6	18
Egypt	4	5	1	1	11
Spain	1	3	1	2	7
Belgium	0	2	2	2	6
Switzerland	0	0	2	3	5
Germany	1	2	2	0	5
Wales	3	0	2	0	5
Netherlands	0	1	2	1	4
Czech Republic	1	1	1	0	3
Poland	1	0	1	1	2
Ukraine	0	1	1	0	2
Slovenia	0	0	0	1	1
Ireland	0	0	0	1	1
Finland	0	0	1	0	1
Hong Kong	0	0	1	0	1
Denmark	0	0	1	0	1
India	0	1	0	0	1
Scotland	1	0	0	0	1
United States	1	0	0	0	1

== See also ==
- World Junior Squash Circuit
- World Junior Squash Championships
- British Junior Open Squash
- Dutch Junior Open Squash
- US Junior Open squash championship
- European Squash Federation
- French Squash Federation
