= Dutch Junior Open Squash 2018 =

2018 in squash

Dutch Junior Open
- 32nd Dutch Junior Open Squash
- Location: Amsterdam, Netherlands
- Venue: Frans Otten Stadion
- Date: July 12 – 15, 2018
- Website www.djosquash.nl

Results
- Champion: (England) Lewis Anderson
- Runner-up: (Spain) Iván Pérez Saavedra
- Semi-finalists: (Spain) Aron Astray Gomez / (England) Carlton Oldham

The DPD Dutch Junior Open Squash 2018 was the men's edition of the 2018 Dutch Junior Open Squash, which is a World Junior Squash Circuit Tier 2 event. The event took place at the Frans Otten Stadion from July 12 to 15. The Boys' Under 19 title stayed in English possession for the second straight year, with Lewis Anderson claiming his first Dutch Junior Open title after defeating Spaniard Iván Pérez Saavedra 3–1 in the Boys' Under 19 final.

== Seeds (Boys' Under 19) ==
1. [1*] (Hungary) Péter Dévald (second round)
2. [2*] (Spain) Iván Pérez Saavedra (finals)
3. [3/4*] (Canada) Dominic Wren (second round)
4. [3/4*] (Netherlands) Luke Stauffer (third round)
5. [5/8*] (Belgium) Dries Verhaegen (quarterfinals)
6. [5/8*] (England) Perry Malik (quarterfinals)
7. [5/8*] (France) Valentin Alberti (third round)
8. [5/8*] (Netherlands) Tom Schreurs (quarterfinals)
9. [9/12*] (France) Quentin Leclerc (second round)
10. [9/12*] (Belgium) Victor Romer (third round)
11. [9/12*] (Belgium) Imen Tack (second round)
12. [9/12*] (Czech Republic) Adam Sinkule (second round)
13. [13/16*] (Luxembourg) Miguel Duarte (first round)
14. [13/16*] (India) Saksham Choudhary (second round)
15. [13/16*] (Russia) Alexander Rozhansky (second round)
16. [13/16*] (Scotland) Tino Mackay (second round)

== Draw and results ==
=== Finals ===
Quarterfinals
(England) Carlton Oldham | 6 | 11 | 9 | 11 | 13
5/8 | (Belgium) Dries Verhaegen | 11 | 9 | 11 | 2 | 11
5/8 | (England) Perry Malik | 6 | 15 | 8 | 11 | 4
(England) Lewis Anderson | 11 | 13 | 11 | 3 | 11
4 | (Spain) Aron Astray Gomez | 17 | 10 | 11 | 7 | 11
(United States) Aditya Kankariya | 15 | 11 | 9 | 11 | 9
5/8 | (Netherlands) Tom Schreurs | 9 | 6 | 8
2 | (Spain) Iván Pérez Saavedra | 11 | 11 | 11

Semifinals
(England) Carlton Oldham | 6 | 7 | 10
(England) Lewis Anderson | 11 | 11 | 12
(Spain) Aron Astray Gomez | 6 | 3 | 15 | 12
2 | (Spain) Iván Pérez Saavedra | 11 | 11 | 13 | 14

Final
(England) Lewis Anderson | 8 | 11 | 12 | 11
2 | (Spain) Iván Pérez Saavedra | 11 | 8 | 10 | 3

=== Top half ===
==== Section 1 ====
First round
1 | (Hungary) Péter Dévald
(United States) Benjamin Gemma | 6 | 5 | 6
(England) Carlton Oldham | 11 | 11 | 11
(Estonia) Walter Herold Veedla
(Pakistan) Daud Khan | wo
(France) Remi Lamilango | 11 | 13 | 11
13/16 | (Luxembourg) Miguel Duarte | 7 | 11 | 4
9/12 | (France) Quentin Leclerc
(England) Karim Samir | 11 | 7 | 6 | 6
(India) Raunak Advani | 9 | 11 | 11 | 11
(Canada) Michael Greenwood | 6 | 4 | 3
(Guernsey) Patrick Josey | 11 | 11 | 11
5/8 | (Belgium) Dries Verhaegen

Second round
1 | (Hungary) Péter Dévald | 8 | 11 | 11 | 5 | 4
(England) Carlton Oldham | 11 | 9 | 7 | 11 | 11
(Estonia) Walter Herold Veedla | 8 | 7 | 1
(France) Remi Lamilango | 11 | 11 | 11
9/12 | (France) Quentin Leclerc | 5 | 10 | 5
(India) Raunak Advani | 11 | 12 | 11
(Guernsey) Patrick Josey | 8 | 12 | 3 | 8
5/8 | (Belgium) Dries Verhaegen | 11 | 10 | 11 | 11

Third round
(England) Carlton Oldham | 11 | 11 | 4 | 11
(France) Remi Lamilango | 3 | 3 | 11 | 3
(India) Raunak Advani | 7 | 12 | 9 | 12
5/8 | (Belgium) Dries Verhaegen | 11 | 10 | 11 | 14

Quarterfinals
(England) Carlton Oldham | 6 | 11 | 9 | 11 | 13
5/8 | (Belgium) Dries Verhaegen | 11 | 9 | 11 | 2 | 11

==== Section 2 ====
First round
5/8 | (England) Perry Malik
(United States) Nicholas Fehn | 3 | 5 | 7
(Netherlands) Henrico van der Vegt | 11 | 11 | 11
(Netherlands) Bjarni Kemperman | 9 | 5 | 11 | 11 | 11
(Scotland) Fraser Steven | 11 | 11 | 8 | 4 | 8
9/12 | (Belgium) Victor Romer
13/16 | (India) Saksham Choudhary
(England) Lucas Hughes | 11 | 9 | 11 | 11
(United States) Eli Kramer | 7 | 11 | 8 | 3
(England) Lewis Anderson | 10 | 11 | 11 | 11
(India) Jairaj Singh | 12 | 8 | 5 | 5
3/4 | (Canada) Dominic Wren

Second round
5/8 | (England) Perry Malik | 2 | 15 | 11 | 11
(Netherlands) Henrico van der Vegt | 11 | 13 | 6 | 2
(Netherlands) Bjarni Kemperman | 3 | 9 | 11 | 9
9/12 | (Belgium) Victor Romer | 11 | 11 | 8 | 11
13/16 | (India) Saksham Choudhary | 5 | 2 | rtd
(England) Lucas Hughes | 11 | 4
(England) Lewis Anderson | 11 | 11 | 11
3/4 | (Canada) Dominic Wren | 8 | 7 | 7

Third round
5/8 | (England) Perry Malik | 5 | 11 | 11 | 11
9/12 | (Belgium) Victor Romer | 11 | 3 | 4 | 4
(England) Lucas Hughes | 10 | 8 | 9
(England) Lewis Anderson | 12 | 11 | 11

Quarterfinals
(England) Perry Malik | 6 | 15 | 8 | 11 | 4
3/4 | (England) Lewis Anderson | 11 | 13 | 11 | 3 | 11

=== Bottom half ===
==== Section 1 ====
First round
3/4 | (Netherlands) Luke Stauffer
(Scotland) Andrew Chrumka | 3 | 1 | 5
(Germany) Laurin Plank | 11 | 11 | 11
(Spain) Aron Astray Gomez | 11 | 11 | 11
(India) Maanav Mandhian | 2 | 4 | 6
13/16 | (Russia) Alexandr Rozhanskiy
9/12 | (Belgium) Imen Tack
(England) Nicholas Harbour | 13 | 7 | 6 | 3
(United States) Aditya Kankariya | 11 | 11 | 11 | 11
(Namibia) Arno Diekmann | 11 | 11 | 11
(India) Uttoreo Saha | 4 | 5 | 5
5/8 | (France) Valentin Alberti

Second round
3/4 | (Netherlands) Luke Stauffer | 11 | 11 | 11
(Germany) Laurin Plank | 4 | 3 | 4
(Spain) Aron Astray Gomez | 11 | 11 | 11
13/16 | (Russia) Alexandr Rozhanskiy | 3 | 3 | 2
9/12 | (Belgium) Imen Tack | 3 | 7 | 8
(United States) Aditya Kankariya | 11 | 11 | 11
(Namibia) Arno Diekmann | 10 | 7 | 8
5/8 | (France) Valentin Alberti | 12 | 11 | 11

Third round
3/4 | (Netherlands) Luke Stauffer | 12 | 3 | 5
(Spain) Aron Astray Gomez | 14 | 11 | 11
(United States) Aditya Kankariya | 11 | 5 | 11 | 11
5/8 | (France) Valentin Alberti | 2 | 11 | 2 | 0

Quarterfinals
(Spain) Aron Astray Gomez | 17 | 10 | 11 | 7 | 11
(United States) Aditya Kankariya | 15 | 12 | 9 | 11 | 9

==== Section 2 ====
First round
5/8 | (Netherlands) Tom Schreurs
(England) James Wilkinson | 6 | 7 | 8 | 11 | 12
(Scotland) Andrew Hill | 6 | 11 | 8 | 10
(Spain) Gonzalo Romero Rodríguez | 11 | 11 | 11
(France) Francois Barnouin | 4 | 2 | 3
9/12 | (Czech Republic) Adam Sinkule
13/16 | (Scotland) Tino Mackay | 11 | 5 | 11 | 15 | 11
(England) Jack Turvey | 9 | 11 | 7 | 17 | 4
(United States) Andrew Leung | 8 | 5 | 9
(England) Oscar Beach | 11 | 11 | 11
(India) Shaan Dalal | 7 | 4 | 5
(England) Ben Merchant | 11 | 11 | 11
2 | (Spain) Ivan Pérez Saavedra

Second round
5/8 | (Netherlands) Tom Schreurs | 14 | 11 | 3 | 11
(England) James Wilkinson | 12 | 7 | 11 | 6
(Spain) Gonzalo Romero Rodríguez | 11 | 11 | 11
9/12 | (Czech Republic) Adam Sinkule | 3 | 9 | 7
13/16 | (Scotland) Tino Mackay | 6 | 8 | 8
(England) Oscar Beach | 11 | 11 | 11
(England) Ben Merchant | 5 | 5 | 6
2 | (Spain) Ivan Pérez Saavedra | 11 | 11 | 11

Third round
5/8 | (Netherlands) Tom Schreurs | 11 | 11 | 6 | 5 | 11
(Spain) Gonzalo Romero Rodríguez | 9 | 8 | 11 | 11 | 8
(England) Oscar Beach | 6 | 5 | 5
2 | (Spain) Ivan Pérez Saavedra | 11 | 11 | 11

Quarterfinals
5/8 | (Netherlands) Tom Schreurs | 9 | 6 | 8
2 | (Spain) Ivan Pérez Saavedra | 11 | 11 | 11

== See also ==
- British Junior Open Squash 2018
- French Junior Open Squash
- 2018 US Junior Open Squash Championships
- World Junior Squash Championships
- 2019 Canadian Junior Open Squash
