= 2019 Canadian Junior Open Squash Championships =

Canadian Junior Open
- Canadian Junior Open Squash Championships
- Location: Niagara-on-the-Lake, Canada
- Venue: The Club at White Oaks
- Date: July 12 – 15, 2018
- Website https://clublocker.com/tournaments/11201/draws?divisionId=7&sectionId=1&viewMode=detailed&offset=0

Results
- Champion: (Mexico) Juan Sebastian Salazar Gomez
- Runner-up: (Canada) Maaz Mufti
- Semi-finalists: (Australia) Ethan Eyles / (Canada) Mitchell Kahnert

The 2019 Canadian Junior Open Squash Championships is the men's edition of the 2019 Canadian Junior Open Squash Championships, which is a World Junior Squash Circuit Tier 3 event. The event took place at The Club at White Oaks from December 6 to 10. Juan Sebastian Salazar Gomez from Mexico claimed his first Canadian Junior Open title after defeating the Canadian Maaz Mufti 3–0 in the Boys' Under 19 final. Gabriel Yun from Canada won his first Canadian Junior Open title defeating Shomari Wiltshire of Guyana in the Boys' Under 17 final.

== Seeds (Boys' Under 19) ==
1. [1*] (Australia) Ethan Eyles (semifinals)
2. [2*] (Canada) Nikhil Ismail (quarterfinals)
3. [3/4*] (Canada) Ali Shalaby (quarterfinals)
4. [3/4*] (Canada) Maaz Mufti (finals)
5. [5/8*] (Argentina) Lisandro Ortiz (third round)
6. [5/8*] (Mexico) Juan Sebastian Salazar Gomez (champion)
7. [5/8*] (Bermuda) Taylor Carrick (third round)
8. [5/8*] (Canada) Mitchell Kahnert (semifinals)
9. [9/12*] (Canada) Dylan Deverill (quarterfinals)
10. [9/12*] (Canada) Antonio Mendes (third round)
11. [9/12*] (Peru) Martin Leon (quarterfinals)
12. [9/12*] (Mexico) Rodrigo Barajas Reyes (third round)
13. [13/16*] (Canada) Liam Jinks (third round)
14. [13/16*] (Canada) James Toth (third round)
15. [13/16*] (Mexico) Jose Santiago Reyes (third round)
16. [13/16*] (Japan) Jason Sano Herring (second round)

== Draw and results ==
=== Finals ===
Quarterfinals
1 | (Australia) Ethan Eyles | 11 | 11 | 11
5/8 | (Canada) Dylan Deverill | 7 | 9 | 4
5/8 | (Mexico) Juan Sebastian Salazar Gomez | 11 | 11 | 11
3/4 | (Canada) Ali Shalaby | 8 | 6 | 7
3/4 | (Canada) Maaz Mufti | 11 | 11 | 11
9/12 | (Peru) Martin Leon | 3 | 9 | 3
5/8 | (Canada) Mitchell Kahnert | 9 | 11 | 9 | 11 | 11
2 | (Canada) Nikhil Ismail | 11 | 8 | 11 | 8 | 5

Semifinals
1 | (Australia) Ethan Eyles | 13 | 11 | 7 | 9 | 7
5/8 | (Mexico) Juan Sebastian Salazar Gomez | 11 | 6 | 11 | 11 | 11
3/4 | (Canada) Maaz Mufti | 11 | 11 | 11
5/8 | (Canada) Mitchell Kahnert | 8 | 8 | 2

Final
5/8 | (Mexico) Juan Sebastian Salazar Gomez | 11 | 11 | 11
3/4 | (Canada) Maaz Mufti | 9 | 8 | 7

=== Top half ===
==== Section 1 ====
First round
1 | (Australia) Ethan Eyles
(Canada) Aaron Nagy
(Peru) Francesco Reategui | 8 | 3 | 11 | 11 | 7
(Canada) Kyle Spackman | 11 | 11 | 1 | 8 | 11
13/16 | (Canada) Liam Jinks | 7 | 11 | 4
9/12 | (Canada) Dylan Deverill
(Canada) Tyson Schille | 8 | 11 | 11 | 11
(Mexico) Ivan Sanchez | 11 | 6 | 7 | 3
(Peru) Ignacio Ugarte | 11 | 11 | 11
(Canada) Samuel Gallant | 6 | 6 | 4
5/8 | (Argentina) Lisando Ortiz

Second round
1 | (Australia) Ethan Eyles | 11 | 11 | 11
(Canada) Aaron Nagy | 4 | 1 | 4
(Canada) Kyle Spackman | 8 | 7 | 1
13/16 | (Canada) Liam Jinks | 11 | 11 | 11
9/12 | (Canada) Dylan Deverill | 11 | 11 | 11
(Canada) Tyson Schille | 1 | 3 | 5 | 5
(Peru) Ignacio Ugarte | 5 | 4 | 8
5/8 | (Argentina) Lisandro Ortiz | 11 | 11 | 11

Third round
1 | (Australia) Ethan Eyles | 11 | 11 | 11
13/16 | (Canada) Liam Jinks | 4 | 7 | 4
9/12 | (Canada) Dylan Deverill | 11 | 6 | 6 | 11 | 11
5/8 | (Argentina) Lisandro Ortiz | 5 | 11 | 11 | 7 | 6

Quarterfinals
(Australia) Ethan Eyles | 11 | 11 | 11
9/12 | (Canada) Dylan Deverill | 7 | 9 | 4

==== Section 2 ====
First round
5/8 | (Mexico) Juan S. S. Gomez | = | = | =
(Canada) Duncan Genge
(Canada) Bilal Ahmed Khan | 8 | 8 | 8
(Mexico) Oliver Martagon | 11 | 11 | 11
9/12 | (Canada) Antonio Mendes
13/16 | (Canada) James Toth
(New Zealand) Connor Bolitho | 11 | 5 | 7 | 8
(Canada) Ahmed Sabrah | 9 | 11 | 11 | 11
(Bermuda) Anaya Smith
3/4 | (Canada) Ali Shalaby

Second round
5/8 | (Mexico) Juan S. S. Gomez | 11 | 11 | 11
(Canada) Duncan Genge | 1 | 3 | 4
(Mexico) Oliver Martagon | 10 | 6 | 7
9/12 | (Canada) Antonio Mendes | 12 | 11 | 11
13/16 | (Canada) James Toth | 11 | 11 | 11
(Canada) Ahmed Sabrah | 5 | 8 | 5
(Bermuda) Anaya Smith | 2 | 4 | 2
3/4 | (Canada) Ali Shalaby | 11 | 11 | 11

Third round
5/8 | (Mexico) Juan S. S. Gomez | 11 | 8 | 11 | 12
9/12 | (Canada) Antonio Mendes | 3 | 11 | 6 | 10
13/16 | (Canada) James Toth | 4 | 3 | 6
3/4 | (Canada) Ali Shalaby | 11 | 11 | 11

Quarterfinals
5/8 | (Mexico) Juan S. S. Gomez | 11 | 11 | 11
3/4 | (Canada) Ali Shalaby | 8 | 6 | 7

=== Bottom half ===
==== Section 1 ====
First round
3/4 | (Canada) Maaz Mufti
(Mexico) Luis L. B. Padilla
(Canada) Ben Boulanger | 11 | 11 | 11
(Cayman Islands) David Pitcairn | 4 | 9 | 8
13/16 | (Mexico) Jose Santiago Reyes
9/12 | (Peru) Martin Leon
(Canada) Jagroop Bhangoo
(Peru) Rodrigo Noriega
5/8 | (Bermuda) Taylor Carrick

Second round
3/4 | (Canada) Maaz Mufti | 11 | 11 | 12
(Mexico) Luis B. P. Padilla | 5 | 7 | 10
(Canada) Ben Boulanger | 14 | 10 | 7
13/16 | (Mexico) Jose Santiago Reyes | 16 | 12 | 11
9/12 | (Peru) Martin Leon | 11 | 11 | 11
(Canada) Jagroop Bhangoo | 5 | 4 | 6
(Peru) Rodrigo Noriega | 4 | 14 | 7 | 9
5/8 | (Bermuda) Taylor Carrick | 11 | 12 | 11 | 11

Third round
3/4 | (Canada) Maaz Mufti | 11 | 11 | 11
13/16 | (Mexico) Jose Santiago Reyes | 2 | 9 | 7
9/12 | (Peru) Martin Leon | 11 | 8 | 12 | 14 | 11
5/8 | (Bermuda) Taylor Carrick | 7 | 11 | 14 | 12 | 7

Quarterfinals
3/4 | (Canada) Maaz Mufti | 11 | 11 | 11
9/12 | (Peru) Martin Leon | 3 | 9 | 3

==== Section 2 ====
First round
5/8 | (Canada) Mitchell Kahnert
(Canada) Felix Scholberg | 2 | 9 | 5
(Mexico) Daniel G. Gomez | 11 | 11 | 11
(Canada) Kiegan Groot
9/12 | (Mexico) Rodrigo Reyes
13/16 | (Japan) Jason Sano Herring
(Mexico) Jose A. L. Espinosa
(Canada) Behrad Haghighi
2 | (Canada) Nikhil Ismail

Second round
5/8 | (Canada) Mitchell Kahnert | 11 | 11 | 11
(Mexico) Daniel G. Gomez | 1 | 2 | 3
(Canada) Kiegan Groot | 9 | 9 | 7
9/12 | (Mexico) Rodrigo Reyes | 11 | 11 | 11
13/16 | (Japan) Jason Herring | 9 | 5 | 9
(Mexico) Jose A. L. Espinosa | 11 | 11 | 11
(Canada) Behrad Haghighi | 2 | 4 | 3
2 | (Canada) Nikhil Ismail | 11 | 11 | 11

Third round
5/8 | (Canada) Mitchell Kahnert | 11 | 11 | 11
9/12 | (Mexico) Rodrigo Reyes | 7 | 8 | 6
(Mexico) Jose A. L. Espinosa | 4 | 3 | 8
2 | (Canada) Nikhil Ismail | 11 | 11 | 11

Quarterfinals
5/8 | (Canada) Mitchell Kahnert | 9 | 11 | 9 | 11 | 11
2 | (Canada) Nikhil Ismail | 11 | 8 | 11 | 8 | 5

== See also ==
- British Junior Open Squash 2018
- French Junior Open Squash
- 2018 US Junior Open Squash Championships
- World Junior Squash Championships
