= Scholberg =

Scholberg is a surname. Notable people with this name include:

- Felix Scholberg, Canadian squash player, competitor in 2019 Canadian Junior Open Squash Championships
- Henry Scholberg (1921–2012), librarian and scholar of India
- Kate Scholberg, Canadian-American physicist
- Kenneth R. Scholberg (1925–1991), American scholar of Spanish literature.
