= Dutch Junior Open Squash =

Super junior squash tournament

Dutch Junior Open

Details
- Event name: Dutch Junior Open
- Location: Amsterdam, Netherlands
- Venue: Frans Otten Stadion
- Website www.djosquash.nl

Men's Winner
- Most recent champion(s): (England) Lewis Anderson

Women's Winner
- Most recent champion(s): (Ukraine) Nadiya Usenko
- Current: Dutch Junior Open Squash 2018

The Dutch Junior Open squash championship is one of the largest individual junior squash tournaments in the world and is considered one of the most prestigious junior squash championships. It has been running since 1987 every year, and is highly established as it is just one of just five Tier 2 events used in the WSF World Junior Squash Circuit. The tournament hosts over 400 players from more than 30 countries every year and is organized by the Dutch Squash Federation and European Squash Federation (ESF), usually in July. It is a Super Series tournament on the ESF junior circuit, as it attracts top players from all over the world.

The tournament is divided into ten categories — Boys Under-19, Boys Under-17, Boys Under-15, Boys Under-13, Boys Under-11, Girls Under-19, Girls Under-17, Girls Under-15, Girls Under-13, and Girls Under-11.

== List of winners by category (Boys) since 2003 ==
Year	Under-11	Under-13	Under-15	Under-17	Under-19
2003	tournament not created	(France) Lucas Vauzelle	(Czech Republic) Petr Martin	(Netherlands) Sebastiaan Weenink	(Netherlands) Dylan Bennett
2004	tournament not created	(Egypt) Islam El Fiky	(Egypt) Ahmed Hawas	(Egypt) Ayman Wahed El Ghazaly	(England) Chris Simpson
2005	tournament not created	(England) Nicholas Hopcroft	(France) Lucas Vauzelle	(England) Joe Lee	(Netherlands) Sebastiaan Weenink
2006	tournament not created	(Malaysia) Affeeq Abedeen Ismail	(Egypt) Amr Khalid Khalifa	(Egypt) Andrew Wagih Shoukry	(Egypt) Mohammed El Kamash
2007	tournament not created	(United States) Dylan Murray	(Egypt) Karim Ali Fathy	(Egypt) Amr Khalid Khalifa	(Switzerland) Nicolas Müller
2008	tournament not created	(Egypt) Karim El Hammamy	(Malaysia) Darren Subramaniam	(Egypt) Ali Farag	(Switzerland) Nicolas Müller
2009	tournament not created	(United States) Bransten Ming	(Jordan) Ahmad Al-Saraj	(Egypt) Karim Ali Fathy	(Finland) Henrik Mustonen
2010	tournament not created	(Finland) Miko Äijänen	(Egypt) Karim El Hammamy	(Egypt) Osama Khalifa	(Egypt) Moustafa Bayoumy
2011	tournament not created	(Egypt) Youssef Ibrahim	(Hong Kong) Tsun Hei Yuen	(Egypt) Seif Abou El Einen	(Egypt) Osama Khalifa
2012	tournament not created	(Egypt) Mostafa Montaser	(Egypt) Yehia Essam	(Peru) Diego Elías	(Qatar) Abdulla Al-Tamimi
2013	tournament not created	(Pakistan) Abbas Zeb	(England) Kyle Finch	(Spain) Edmon López Möller	(Qatar) Abdulla Al-Tamimi
2014	tournament not created	(England) Jared Carter	(England) Elliot Ridge	(Finland) Miko Äijänen	(Hong Kong) Tsun Hei Yuen
2015	tournament not created	(England) Sam Todd	(India) Tushar Shahani	(Egypt) Hisham Fansa	(England) Patrick Rooney
2016	tournament not created	(England) Sam Osborne-Wylde	(England) Jared Carter	(Egypt) Mostafa Asal	(Jordan) Mohammad Al Sarraj
2017	tournament not created	(Egypt) Omar Azzam	(India) Neel Joshi	(United States) Daelum Mawji	(England) Curtis Malik
2018	(Egypt) Youssef Teleb	(England) Alexander Broadbridge	(Netherlands) Rowan Damming	(India) Neel Joshi	(England) Lewis Anderson
2019	(Egypt) Adham Wael	(England) Abdallah Eissa	(Egypt) Mohamed Ismail	(India) Neel Joshi	(England) Sam Todd
2025	(United States) Archibald Anolik	(Colombia) Suarez Esteban	(Egypt) Omar Sadek	(Egypt) Michael Fayez	(France) Amir Khaled-Jousselin

=== Boys' champions by country since 2003 ===
Country	U-11	U-13	U-15	U-17	U-19	Total
Egypt	1	5	7	10	3	26
England	0	5	3	1	4	13
United States	1	2	0	1	0	4
Netherlands	0	0	0	1	2	3
India	0	0	2	1	0	3
Switzerland	0	0	0	0	2	2
Qatar	0	0	0	0	2	2
Jordan	0	0	1	0	1	2
Hong Kong	0	0	1	0	1	2
Finland	0	1	0	1	0	2
France	0	1	1	0	0	2
Malaysia	0	1	1	0	0	2
Peru	0	0	0	1	0	1
Spain	0	0	0	1	0	1
Czech Republic	0	0	1	0	0	1
Pakistan	0	1	0	0	0	1
Colombia	0	1	0	0	0	1
France	0	0	0	0	1	1

== List of winners by category (Girls) since 2003 ==
Year	Under-11	Under-13	Under-15	Under-17	Under-19
2003	tournament not created	(Wales) Natalie Pritchard	(France) Camille Serme	(Hong Kong) Joey Chan	(Belgium) Charlie de Rycke
2004	tournament not created	(India) Dipika Pallikal	(Malaysia) Low Wee Wern	(Canada) Neha Kumar	(Belgium) Charlie de Rycke
2005	tournament not created	(United States) Olivia Blatchford	(India) Dipika Pallikal	(Egypt) Nour Bahgat	(Belgium) Charlie de Rycke
2006	tournament not created	(Egypt) Kanzy El Defrawy	(India) Dipika Pallikal	(Egypt) Heba El Torky	(France) Camille Serme
2007	tournament not created	(Egypt) Salma Esmat	(Egypt) Kanzy El Defrawy	(England) Millie Tomlinson	(Malaysia) Low Wee Wern
2008	tournament not created	(Egypt) Laila Omar	(Hong Kong) Ho Ka Po	(Hong Kong) Tong Tsz-Wing	(Egypt) Salma Nassar
2009	tournament not created	(Malaysia) Jadeleen Lee	(Hong Kong) Ho Ka Po	(Egypt) Menna Nasser	(Malaysia) Low Wee Nee
2010	tournament not created	(Egypt) Nouran Gohar	(Egypt) Laila Omar	(Egypt) Haidi Lala	(England) Emily Whitlock
2011	tournament not created	(Egypt) Nadeen Kotb	(Mexico) Maria Fernanda Rivera	(Egypt) Haidi Lala	(Wales) Tesni Evans
2012	tournament not created	(Egypt) Raneem El Torky	(England) Amelia Henley	(England) Lucy Beecroft	(France) Mélissa Alves
2013	tournament not created	(Netherlands) Elena Wagenmans	(India) Akanksha Salunkhe	(England) Lily Taylor	(Malaysia) Sue Ann Yong
2014	tournament not created	(United States) Eujung Park	(Hong Kong) Lui Hiu Lam	(Canada) Chloe Chemtob	(France) Marie Stephan
2015	tournament not created	(Egypt) Jana Safy	(United States) Marina Stefanoni	(England) Jasmine Hutton	(England) Georgina Kennedy
2016	tournament not created	(Egypt) Nour Heikal	(England) Katie Malliff	(England) Elise Lazarus	(Belgium) Tinne Gilis
2017	tournament not created	(Egypt) Lojayn Gohary	(India) Ananya Dabke	(England) Katie Malliff	(Poland) Karina Tyma
2018	(Egypt) Jumana Fouad	(Egypt) Nour Khafagy	(Egypt) Malak Khafagy	(England) Margot Prow	(Ukraine) Nadiya Usenko
2019	(England) Marian Eissa	(India) Anahat Singh	(United States) Jhansi Bhavsar	(Egypt) Malak Khafagy	(Netherlands) Fleur Maas

=== Girls' champions by country since 2003 ===
Country	U-11	U-13	U-15	U-17	U-19	Total
Egypt	1	10	3	5	1	20
England	0	0	2	7	2	11
Malaysia	0	1	1	0	3	5
Hong Kong	0	0	3	2	0	5
Belgium	0	0	0	0	4	4
India	0	1	3	0	0	4
France	0	0	1	0	2	3
United States	0	2	1	0	0	3
Netherlands	0	1	0	0	1	2
Wales	0	1	0	0	1	2
Canada	0	0	0	2	0	2
Poland	0	0	0	0	1	1
Ukraine	0	0	0	0	1	1
Mexico	0	0	1	0	0	1

== See also ==
- World Junior Squash Circuit
- World Junior Squash Championships
- British Junior Open Squash
- French Junior Open Squash
- Canadian Junior Open Squash
- US Junior Open squash championship
- European Squash Federation
- Dutch Squash Federation
