= Nadiya Usenko =

Ukrainian professional squash player

Nadiia Usenko
Personal information
- Born: 29 January 2000 (age 26) Kyiv, Ukraine
- Height: 158 cm (5 ft 2 in)
- Weight: 55 kg (121 lb)

Sport
- Country: Ukraine
- Handedness: Right handed
- Turned pro: 2014
- Retired: Active
- Racquet used: Harrow

Women's singles
- Highest ranking: No. 76 (January 2016)
- Current ranking: No. 97 (January 2020)
- Title: National Champion (x7)
Medal record
Women's squash
Representing Ukraine
European Team Championship
Bronze medal – third place	2014 Zagreb	Division 3
Gold medal – first place	2018 Riga	Division 3
Silver medal – second place	2025 Wrocław	Division 2
- Updated on June 2025

Nadiia Usenko (born 29 January 2000 in Kyiv) is a Ukrainian professional squash player. As of February 2018, she was ranked number 102 in the world and number 1 in Ukraine.

In 2017, she took part in The World Games. The same year in December she was representing Ukraine at the World Championships (Manchester, United Kingdom) for the first time in the Ukrainian squash history.

== Junior career ==
In 2011, Nadiia Usenko started to participate in the ESF (European Squash Federation) junior tournaments and managed to achieve number 1 position in the European Junior Ranking in the each of age category: GU13, GU15, GU17 and GU19. She won Dutch Junior Open title in her last junior event in 2018.

== Ukrainian National Squash Team ==
Nadiia Usenko became a member of the National Ukrainian Squash Team in 2014 at the age of 14.

In 2018, she won a gold medal at European Team Championship in Division 3 in Riga, Latvia.

== CSA squash ==
In 2018, Usenko joined Trinity College Women's Squash Team. She played 3 seasons for Bantams (season 2020-2021 cancelled due to COVID). Her senior year, she was named a captain of the team. Her overall record in college squash league is 48-9.
