= Bill Hardwick =

American politician

Member of the Missouri House of Representatives from the 121st district
- Incumbent
- Assumed office January 6, 2021
- Preceded by: Steve Lynch (redistricting)
- Succeeded by: Keith Pritchard (elect)

Personal details
- Born: Rolla, Missouri, U.S.
- Party: Republican
- Education: University of Missouri (BA, JD)
- Awards: Bronze Star Medal, Combat Action Badge

Military service
- Branch/service: United States Army
- Rank: Lieutenant Colonel
- Unit: Missouri National Guard
- Battles/wars: Siege of Sadr City, Iraq War

Bill Hardwick is an American attorney, combat veteran, and politician serving as a member of the Missouri House of Representatives. Elected in November 2020 from House district 122, he assumed office on January 6, 2021. He was re-elected in 2022 and 2024 after redistricting in House District 121.

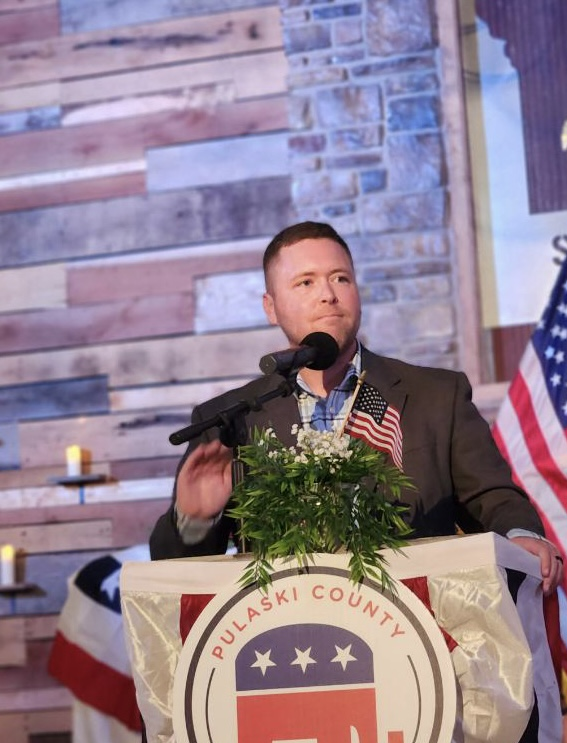
Bill Hardwick speaking to a crowd in Pulaski County, Missouri in 2023.

== Early life and education ==
Hardwick was born in Rolla, Missouri at what is now Phelps Health Hospital and graduated from Dixon Senior High School in Dixon, Missouri. During high school, Hardwick was a member of student council, competed in math contests and Science Olympiad and participated in sports: cross country, basketball, track, and soccer. His father, Lonnie Hardwick was a carpenter and construction worker and his mother, Millie Hardwick, worked in home healthcare until she became a school teacher. He earned a Bachelor of Arts degree in classics from the University of Missouri and a Juris Doctor from the University of Missouri School of Law. At Mizzou Law School, he was Associate Editor in Chief of the Missouri Law Review.

== Military service ==
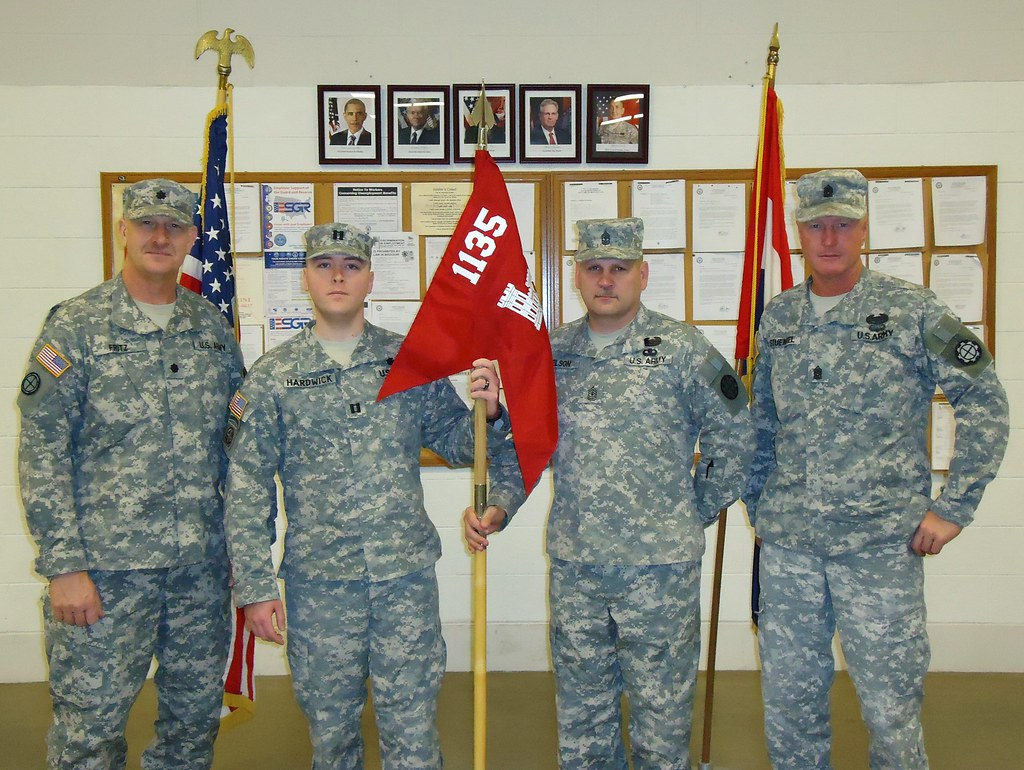
Captain Hardwick assumes command of the 1135th Engineer Company in 2011 in Richmond, Missouri.

Bill Hardwick enlisted in the Missouri Army National Guard in 2002 and attended basic training at Fort Sill, Oklahoma the summer after September 11, 2001. He attended advanced individual training (AIT) at Fort Leonard Wood, Missouri and was awarded the MOS of Quarrying Specialist. In 2004, Hardwick attended Primary Leadership Development Course (PLDC) at Camp Ashland, Nebraska.

In 2005, Hardwick was selected for Officer Candidate School. At OCS, awarded the leadership award for having the highest ratings while in a leadership position and receiving the highest score on the leadership exam. Hardwick was also the youngest OCS graduate in his class commissioning as a Second Lieutenant at the age of twenty. In 2006, he attended Engineer Officer Basic Course (EOBC) at Fort Leonard Wood, Missouri. He was assigned as a platoon leader in the 203d Engineer Battalion.

In 2007, Hardwick was deployed to Baghdad, Iraq. He initially served as an engineer intelligence officer analyzing IED patterns and complex attacks on coalition forces from insurgents. He volunteered to serve as route clearance platoon leader and counter-IED patrol leader. Route clearance at the time was considered one of the most dangerous jobs for coalition forces in Iraq. He extended on his deployed and served as a platoon leader of 1st Platoon, 237th Sapper Company. The company served as the combat engineer unit for 2nd Brigade, 82nd Airborne Division. As a result of injuries from IED attacks, Hardwick sustained a concussion, nerve damage, burns, and shrapnel scars.

Upon redeployment to the United States, Hardwick was promoted to Captain and assigned commander of the 1135th Engineer Company. Hardwick was activated to state emergency duty as part of the National Guard task force that responded to the Joplin Tornado in May 2011. He planned and directed operations for search and rescue, support to local law enforcement, security during President Obama's visit, and recovery and reconstruction operations. He graduated from the United States Army Command and General Staff College with honors and was awarded a skill identifier as a strategist. Hardwick was assigned as a battalion commander in the 35th Infantry Division.

As a major at the Command and General Staff College, one of Hardwick's history papers was selected for publication in the Marine Corps Gazette. In the article, Hardwick argued that political leaders owed to the American people and members of the military clearly defined strategic end states in military conflicts. He compared Vietnam and the Global War on Terror as examples of when the domestic politics and political will prevented unified agreement as to why American was involved in conflict and the what the desired national interest was as well as the appropriate moral outcome. Hardwick favored General Colin Powell's Powell Doctrine as a template for military action which he described as: 1. Engage in warfare as a last resort after careful consideration of the costs and loss of human life. 2. Only fight when a vital national security interest is threatened. 3. Identify a clear and feasibly attainable objective. 4. Identify an end state and exit strategy: the controllable conditions that allow for withdraw of U.S. forces. 5. Earn the support of the American people and international community. 6. Employ overwhelming force and fire power. At CGSC, Hardwick was awarded the Iron Pen Award for exceptional writing on military history.

== Legal career ==
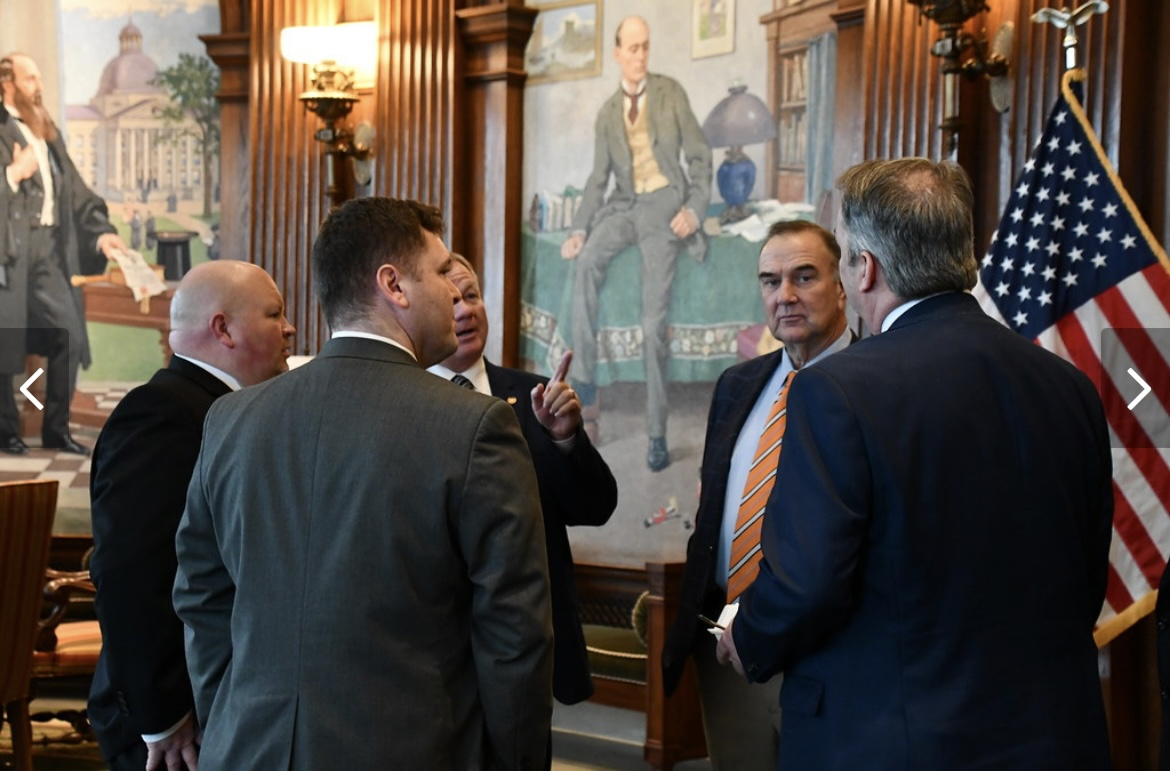
Bill Hardwick and Missouri State Legislators meet with Missouri Governor Mike Kehoe in 2025

At Mizzou Law School, Hardwick studied trial practice, he participated in prosecution clinic and legislative practicum. He interned at the Cole County Prosecutor's Office and United States Attorney's Office. After graduating law school, then newly elected prosecutor, Kevin Hillman, hired Bill Hardwick as an assistant prosecuting attorney for Pulaski County. Hardwick tried felony and misdemeanor cases. He was appointed by the St. Robert, Missouri city council to be the city prosecutor for St. Robert, Missouri.

In 2013, Bill Hardwick hired by the Department of the Army as an attorney advisor. As a civilian attorney for the Army, he practiced administrative law, contract law, environmental law, and employment law. Hardwick represented the Army in federal litigation and drafted multiple regulations that went in effect on Fort Leonard Wood, Missouri. In 2015, he became a supervisory attorney advisor and chief of the client services division. That same year, he was appointed as a Special Assistant United States Attorney in the Western District of Missouri.

== Member of the Missouri House of Representatives ==
Hardwick was elected to the Missouri House of Representatives in November 2020 and assumed office on January 6, 2021. In the 2022 Missouri House of Representatives election, he was redistricted to the 121st district.

In 2021, Bill Hardwick passed his first bill out of the house designating the Missouri National Guard Joplin Armory for SGT Wayne Crow who served with Hardwick in Iraq then was later killed in action while deployed to Afghanistan. The bill became law, and the armory was renamed in an official ceremony honoring SGT Crow in 2022.

In 2021, Bill Hardwick sponsored the Missouri Cybersecurity Act, designed to help the state identity cyber vulnerabilities and develop attack response plans for critical infrastructure as well as state and local agencies. In that same session, Hardwick passed language into law that would allow persons wrongfully convicted of crimes who were actually innocent to have the conviction set aside or vacated. In 2022, Hardwick worked on a constitutional amendment which eventually created the Missouri Department of the National Guard and added language to the proposal that the Guard must uphold the United States and Missouri Constitutions and protect the rights and civil liberties of all Missourians.

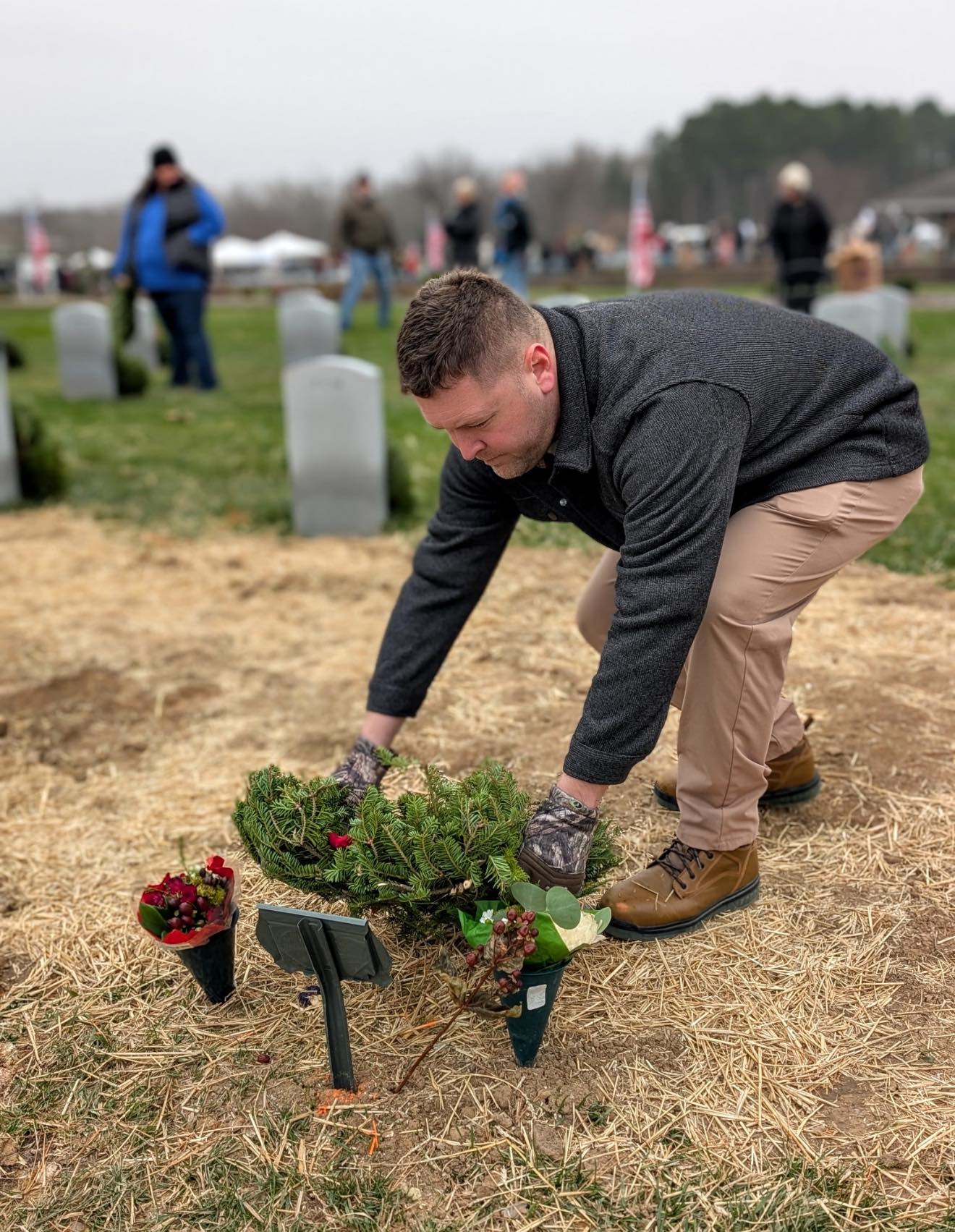
Representative Hardwick participates in Wreaths Across America at the Fort Leonard Wood, Missouri Veterans Cemetery

Since 2021, Hardwick served as a commissioner on the Missouri Military Preparedness and Enhancement Commission. The commission advises the Missouri Governor and state legislature on defense and military matters and makes recommendations on policies regarding defense dependent communities, military installations, and defense related businesses within the state.

On October 4, 2022, Hardwick testified before the Missouri General Assembly's Joint Committee on Agriculture that he believed China's purchase and ownership of farmland posed a national security threat and that Chinese control of the food supply could reach a tipping point where China controlled prices and supply and demand.

In 2023, the Conservative Political Action Conference (CPAC) identified Bill Hardwick as one of the most conservative members of the Missouri Legislature and awarded him and twenty-five other members of the House of Representatives the Conservative Excellence award for voting with the conservative position over ninety percent of the time. In 2025, CPAC identified Hardwick as one of the top ten most conservative legislators in the Missouri House of Representatives.

At the beginning of the COVID 19 pandemic in April 2020, Hardwick argued against lockdowns and stay at home orders. He cited economist F.A. Hayek's description of dispersed knowledge to maintain that the government was not qualified to determine who was essential or qualified to direct the means of production during the pandemic.

In 2022 and 2023, Hardwick sponsored legislation to prohibit COVID-19 vaccine requirements for public schools and public agencies and would require vaccine exemptions for universities and private sector employers. In testimony, Hardwick stated uncertainty if the vaccine saved more lives than taken. In 2023, on the floor of the Missouri House of Representatives, Hardwick stated that the mRNA COVID vaccines were causing myocarditis.

In 2023, Hardwick supported legislation that would prevent minors from receiving gender affirming care, including access to hormones and puberty blockers. Hardwick stated that putting in place bans on minor gender affirming care is distinguishable from restrictions on transgender health care for adults.

In the 2024 U.S. Presidential primary election, Hardwick publicly endorsed Donald Trump.

In 2024, Bill Hardwick supported the deployment of Missouri National Guardsmen to the United States southern border stating: "if we don't have a border, we don't have a country, a political boundary that a nation state could define its jurisdiction. That's part of what makes us a sovereign nation." Hardwick also argued the border crisis led to the inflow of fentanyl and human trafficking into the United States.

In the 2024 election cycle, Missouri Right to Life endorsed Hardwick due to his anti-abortion stances and votes. Hardwick was an outspoken opponent of Missouri's Amendment 3 in 2024 which established the rights to reproductive health care in the Missouri Constitution.

Bill Hardwick was the Chairman and member of the board of directors of the Sustainable Ozarks Partnership. The Sustainable Ozark Partnership is nonprofit to support and strengthen the Fort Leonard Wood Region. This region is defined as the four counties – Laclede, Phelps, Pulaski, and Texas – surrounding Fort Leonard Wood.

In 2025, Hardwick cosponsored and encouraged the passage of the Missouri Farm Bureau health plan bill which provided more healthcare plan options and healthcare contract options for Missouri farmers. The legislation was signed into law by Governor Mike Kehoe on July 14, 2025. Missouri Farm Bureau stated in response the legislation becoming law: "This is a significant win for our members and all rural Missourians. For years, our members have told us how desperately they needed another option to manage their health care expenses. The existing coverage options were simply out of reach or unavailable for too many hardworking families."

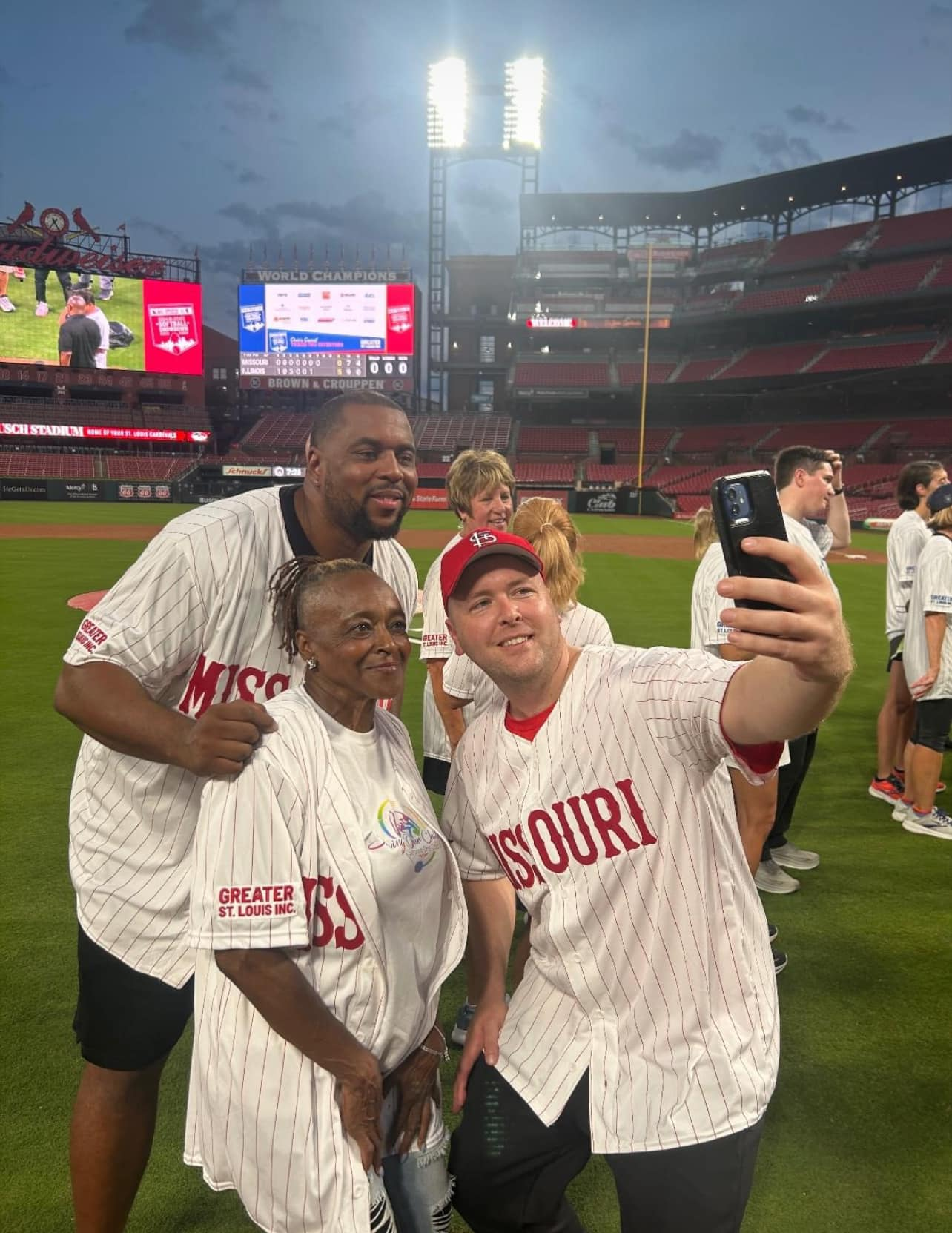
Representative Hardwick with Representative Marlene Terry and Representative Marlon Anderson at the legislative baseball game at Busch Stadium in St. Louis, Missouri.

In 2025, Hardwick introduced legislation to license and regulate video lottery terminals to replace "no chance" gaming machines, which have been subject of dispute with Missouri Gaming Commission as unregulated gambling and subject of lobbying by Steven Tilley representing Torch Electronics.

Hardwick was an early supporter of Missouri's Second Amendment Preservation Act arguing that local police refusing to enforce federal gun laws was an important part of vertical federalism and that compelling them to do so was a violation of the anticommandeering doctrine described by Justice Antonin Scalia in Printz v. United States. In 2025, Hardwick sponsored a bill to revive the Second Amendment Preservation Act, which was blocked by federal courts after passage in 2021.

Members of law enforcement have opposed the legislation, saying that it presents risks to police and public safety. Hardwick's 2025 version adapted language in response to previous pushback, however legal experts say that it still opens police departments to liabilities that interfere with law enforcement. Similar legislation has been promoted in other states by the American Firearms Association, whose director, Alex Dorr, has targeted opposing police and legislators on social media.

In 2023, 2024, and 2025, Hardwick sponsored legislation that would ban Missouri or its political subdivisions from using red flag laws for the temporary seizure of firearms. Hardwick stated he believed red flag laws were a violation of an individual's due process rights.

In 2024 and 2025, Hardwick proposed the Constitution Money Act which would allow for another method of paying debts and transacting business in addition to the U.S. dollar that was backed by gold and silver. Hardwick argued that a parallel transaction method was only allowed under the U.S. Constitution if it was based on gold and silver. Article I, Section 10 of the Constitution for the United States expressly prohibits states from [making] “any Thing but gold and silver Coin a Tender in Payment of Debts.” Hardwick argued that a state based financial market was important in creating a hedge against inflation of the dollar, needed as an alternative in the case of global financial collapse, and would serve as bulwark against a transition to a central bank digital currency. The Missouri Legislature passed the legislation in 2025, and it was signed into law by Governor Kehoe. Hardwick stated the point of the legislation was "about restoring economic and political freedom back to everyday Missourians."

== State Senate Campaign ==
In 2025, Hardwick launched his State Senate candidacy to replace term limited Senator Justin Brown. Hardwick put forth a platform of limited government, individual liberty, private property rights, opposing abortion, and protecting gun rights. Hardwick describes himself as a constitutional conservative.

== Hobbies and Interests ==
Bill Hardwick is a blue belt in Brazilian Jiujitsu. He is an avid reader, deer hunter, and chess player.

== Electoral history ==
=== State representative ===
Missouri House of Representatives Election, November 3, 2020, District 122
Party	Candidate	Votes	%	±%
Republican	Bill Hardwick	6,133	69.30%	
Democratic	Yvonne Reeves-Chong	2,717	30.70%	
Total votes		8,850	100.00%	

Missouri House of Representatives Election, November 8, 2022, District 121
Party	Candidate	Votes	%	±%
Republican	Bill Hardwick	3,671	100.00%	+30.70
Total votes		3,671	100.00%	
