= Steve Lynch (politician) =

American politician

Member of the Missouri House of Representatives from the 122nd district
- In office 2012–2021
- Succeeded by: Bill Hardwick

Personal details
- Born: June 1, 1954 (age 72) Waynesville, Missouri, U.S.
- Party: Republican
- Spouse: Deborah
- Children: 3

Steve Lynch (born June 1, 1954) is an American politician who served as a member of the Missouri House of Representatives for the 122nd district from 2012 to 2021. He is a member of the Republican party.
