= Kim Hannes =

Belgian squash player (born 1978)

Personal information
- Born: 10 August 1978 (age 47) Aarschot, Belgium

Sport
- Country: Belgium
- Handedness: right-handed
- Turned pro: 1995
- Coached by: Shaun Moxham
- Racquet used: Dunlop

Women's singles
- Highest ranking: No. 33 (December, 2002)
- Titles: French Junior Open Squash (1994); British Junior Open Squash (1997)
Medal record
Representing Belgium
Women's squash
World University Squash Championships
Silver medal – second place	1998 Cardiff	singles
- Updated on 7 May 2018

Kim Hannes (born 10 August 1978) is a former Belgian female squash player. Kim Hannes married fellow Belgian star squash player Stefan Casteleyn in 2014. She achieved her highest career singles ranking of World No. 33 in December 2002.

== Career ==
Kim Hannes rose to prominence in her squash career after winning the Girl's U17 category of the inaugural edition of the French Junior Open Squash in 1994. After turning professional in 1995, she emerged as champion in the Girls' U19 category at the British Junior Open Squash in 1997. Hannes also took part in the second edition of the World University Squash Championships in 1998 and claimed the silver medal in the women's singles event.
