= Keith Pritchard =

American politician

Member-elect of the Missouri House of Representatives from the 121st district
- Assuming office January 6, 2027
- Succeeding: Bill Hardwick

Personal details
- Party: Republican
- Website: Campaign website

Keith Pritchard is an American politician of the Missouri Republican Party who is the representative-elect for the 121st district in the Missouri House of Representatives. He was elected in the 2026 general election. He previously served as a civilian aide to the Secretary of the Army and State President of the Association of the United States Army.
