= Iván Pérez Saavedra =

Spanish squash player (born 2000)

Ivan Perez
Personal information
- Born: 17 December 2000 (age 25) Tenerife, Spain
- Height: 1.75
- Weight: 76

Sport
- Turned pro: 2019
- Retired: Active
- Racquet used: Unsquashable

Men's singles
- Highest ranking: No. 69 (November 2025)
- Current ranking: No. 69 (November 2025)
- Title: 7

Ivan Perez (born 17 December 2000 in Tenerife) is a Spanish professional squash player. He reached a career high ranking of 69 in the world during November 2025.

== Biography ==
In April 2025, Pérez won his 6th PSA title after securing victory in the Rotterdam Open during the 2024–25 PSA Squash Tour. In November 2025, a 7th PSA title followed after winning the Andorra Open during the 2025–26 PSA Squash Tour.
