= Elin Harlow =

Welsh squash player (born 1993)

Personal information
- Born: 28 November 1993 (age 32) Bangor, Wales

Sport
- Country: Wales
- Coached by: Andrew Evans
- Racquet used: Prince

Women's singles
- Highest ranking: 92 (May 2016)

Elin Harlow is a Welsh squash player. She has represented Wales in junior and senior level competitions. She achieved her highest career singles ranking of 92 in May 2016.

== Career ==
Elin caught the attention after being crowned as champion in French Junior Open Squash tournament on three occasions. She won the 2011 tournament in Under-13 category and become champion in the Under-17 category in two consecutive years in 2013 and 2014.

She then went on to represent Wales at senior level for the first time at the 2014 Women's World Team Squash Championships. Interestingly, Wales women's team recorded the best result at a World Championship by placing at 9th position. She also took part at the 2016-17 PSA World Tour.
