= Eve Coxon =

New Zealand Pacific studies academic

Eve Coxon CNZM
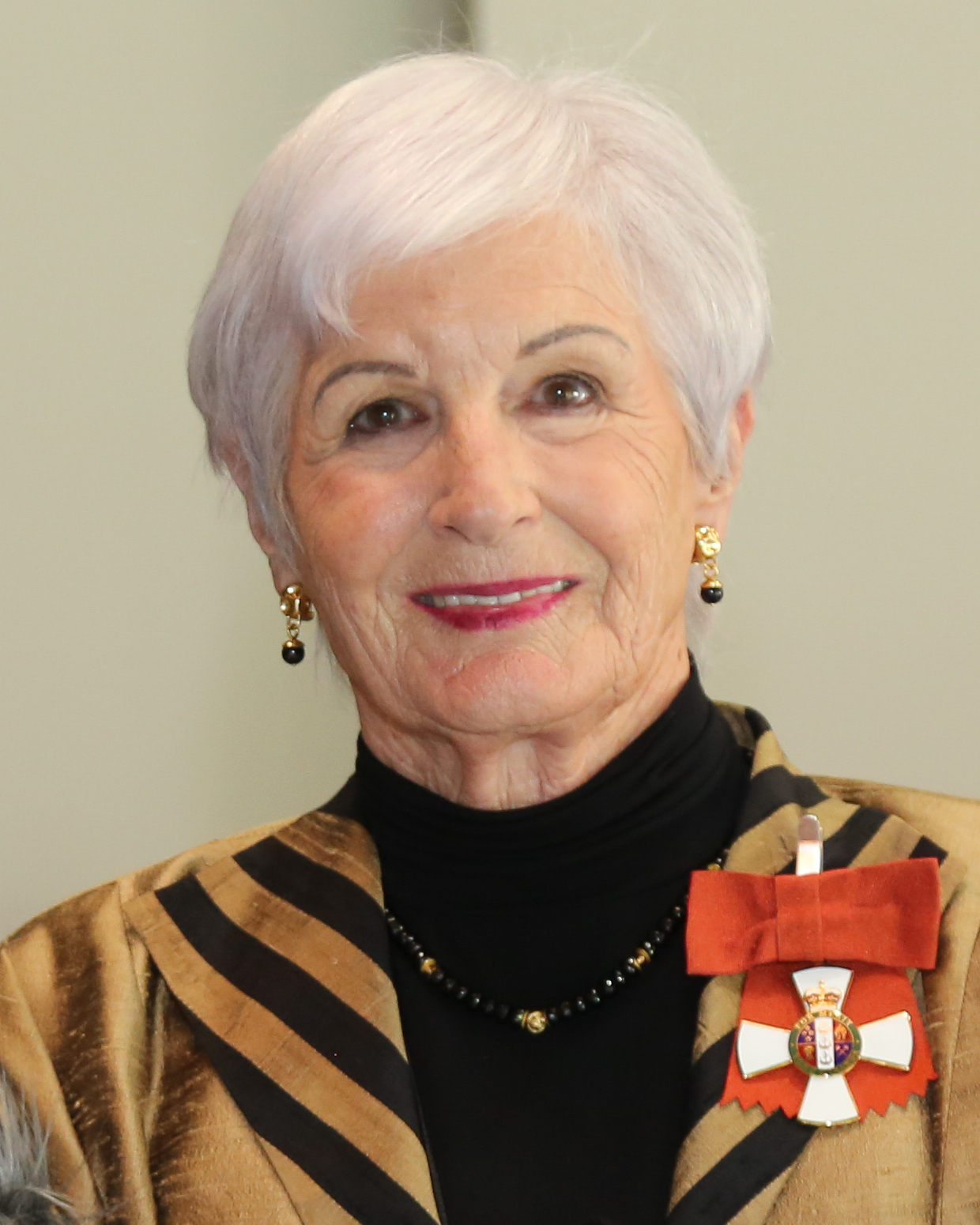
- Coxon in 2022
- Born: 1948

Academic background
- Education: University of Auckland
- Theses: A critical education: the ’Atenisi alternative (1988); The politics of 'Modernisation' in western Samoan education (1996)
- Doctoral advisor: Judith Huntsman; Michael Peters

Academic work
- Discipline: Pacific education
- Institutions: University of Auckland
- Doctoral students: Moʻale ʻOtunuku

Evelyn Imelda Coxon CNZM is a New Zealand education academic, and an expert in Pacific education. In 2021, Coxon was appointed a Companion of the New Zealand Order of Merit, for services to Pacific and tertiary education.

== Academic career ==
Coxon completed a master's degree titled A critical education: the ’Atenisi alternative at the University of Auckland and PhD titled The politics of 'Modernisation' in western Samoan education. Coxon then joined the faculty of the University of Auckland, where she was the founding director of the university's Research Unit in Pacific Education. She led the development of undergraduate and postgraduate courses on Pacific studies and education. Coxon was also involved in the development of Rethinking Pacific Education Initiative for Pacific Peoples, which celebrated twenty years of educational leadership development in 2022.

Coxon has been president of the Oceania Comparative Education Society, and served on the World Council of Comparative Education Societies. She has consulted on educational leadership throughout the Pacific, including advising the education ministries in Fiji, Samoa and Tonga.

== Honours and awards ==
In 1991, Coxon was awarded a Winston Churchill Memorial Fellowship for a project titled Educational environments and the factors that contribute to educational success and/or failure among Pacific Island pupils in Auckland schools; Rarotonga and Western Samoa.

In the 2021 Queen's Birthday Honours, Coxon was appointed a Companion of the New Zealand Order of Merit, for services to Pacific and tertiary education.

== Selected works ==
Books

- The Politics of learning and teaching in Aotearoa-New Zealand. Palmerston North: Dunmore Press. 1994.
- Polynesian Paradox: Essays in Honour of Futa Helu. Institute of Pacific Studies, University of the South Pacific. 2005. pp. 1–267.
- Global/Local Intersections: Researching the delivery of aid to Pacific Education. Research Unit of Pacific Education. 2003. pp. 1–166.
- Literature review on Pacific education issues: final report. Wellington: Ministry of Education. 2002.

Journal articles

- John Benseman; Coxon, Evelyn Imelda; Helen Anderson; Melani Anae (2006). "Retaining non‐traditional students: lessons learnt from Pasifika students in New Zealand". Higher Education Research and Development. 25 (2): 147–162. doi:10.1080/07294360600610388. Wikidata Q130438289.
- Coxon, Evelyn Imelda; Karen Munce (2008). "The global education agenda and the delivery of aid to Pacific education". Comparative Education. 44 (2): 147–165. doi:10.1080/03050060802041050. Wikidata Q130454151.
