= Sina Wall =

German squash player (born 1989)

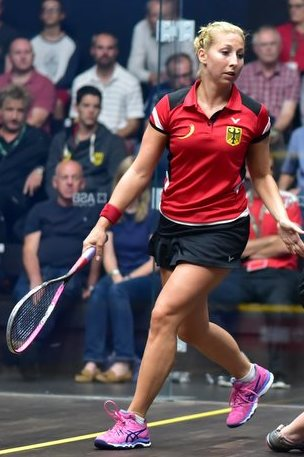

Personal information
- Born: December 30, 1989 (age 36) Munich, Germany

Sport
- Country: Germany
- Handedness: Right Handed
- Turned pro: 2007
- Coached by: Ronny Vlasskas
- Retired: 2018
- Racquet used: Tecnifibre

Women's singles
- Highest ranking: No. 41 (December 2011)
- Updated on 2 June 2018

Sina Wall (born 30 December 1989, in Munich) is a German former professional squash player who represented Germany in multiple European and World Team Championships. She reached a career-high world ranking of World No. 41 in December 2011. In 2011 she won the German Nationals and reached the final in 2008, 2009, 2010 and 2014. She is married to fellow German squash player Raphael Kandra.
