= Célia Allamargot =

French squash player (born 1986)

Personal information
- Born: April 14, 1986 (age 40) La Rochelle, France

Sport
- Country: France
- Handedness: right-handed
- Turned pro: 2005
- Racquet used: Dunlop

Women's singles
- Highest ranking: 61 (June 2009)

Célia Allamargot (French pronunciation: [seˈlja a.la.maʁˈgo]) also known as Célia Pashley (born 14 April 1986) is a former professional French female squash player.

== Squash career ==
She competed in the Women's World Team Squash Championships in 2004, 2006 and 2008. Célia Allamargot achieved her highest singles career ranking of 61 in June 2009.
