= Manuela Zehnder =

Swiss squash player (born 1983)

Personal information
- Born: 8 May 1983 (age 43) Aadorf, Switzerland

Sport
- Country: Switzerland
- Handedness: Right Handed
- Turned pro: 2001
- Coached by: John Williams
- Racquet used: Dunlop

Women's singles
- Highest ranking: No. 95 (March 2002)
- Updated on 22 December 2009

Manuela Zehnder (born 8 May 1983 in Aadorf) is a professional squash player who represented Switzerland. She reached a career-high world ranking of World No. 95 in March 2002.
