= Karina Tyma =

Polish squash player (born 2000)

Personal information
- Born: 5 May 2000 (age 26) Gorzów Wielkopolski, Poland
- Website: https://karinatyma.com

Sport
- Country: Polish
- Handedness: Right handed
- Turned pro: 2017
- Retired: Active

Women's singles
- Highest ranking: No. 61 (May 2022)
- Current ranking: No. 87 (May 2026)
- Title: 4

Karina Tyma (born 5 May 2000) is a Polish professional squash player. She reached a career high ranking of 61 in the world during May 2022.

== Biography ==
Educated at Drexel University, she won the European U19 Individual Championships 2019 and the 2021 Texas Open. She won 9 national titles in 2017, 2019, 2020, 2021, 2022, 2023, 2024, 2025 and 2026 Tyma was enrolled at Drexel University in the United States and played for Drexel Dragons Women Squash. In June 2021, she won her second PSA title, the Life Time City Center Open 2021, in Houston.

In June 2023 Tyma graduated from Drexel University with Bachelor of Arts in Political Science. In December 2024 Tyma graduated from Drexel University with Master of Science in Public Policy.

In April 2025, Tyma won her 3rd PSA title after securing victory in the Squash On Fire Challenge during the 2024–25 PSA Squash Tour. In February 2026, Tyma won her fourth PSA title after securing victory in Guilfoyle Toronto Classic.
