= 2009 PSA World Tour =

PSA World Tour 2009

Details
- Event name: PSA World Tour 2009
- Tournaments: 120
- Categories: PSA World Championship; PSA World Series (8); PSA World Series Finals; PSA Stars (over 2&1/2) (16); PSA Stars (under 2&1/2) (94)
- Website www.psaworldtour.com

Achievements
- World Number 1: (Egypt) Karim Darwish (11 months) (France) Grégory Gaultier (1 month)
- World Champion: (Egypt) Amr Shabana

Awards
- Player of the year: (Egypt) Karim Darwish
- Young player of the year: (Egypt) Mohamed El Shorbagy

The PSA World Tour 2009 is the international squash tour organised circuit organized by the Professional Squash Association (PSA) for the 2009 squash season. The most important tournament in the series is the World Open held in Kuwait. The tour features three categories of regular events, Super Series, which feature the highest prize money and the best fields, Stars Tournament and Challenger.

== 2009 Calendar ==
=== Key ===
World Open
World Series Platinum
World Series Gold & Silver
5 Stars
4 Stars

=== World Open ===
Tournament	Date	Champion	Runner-up	Semifinalists	Quarterfinalists	Round of 16	
World Open 2009; Kuwait City, Kuwait; World Open $277,500 - Draw	1–7 November 2009	(Egypt) Amr Shabana; 11–8, 11–5, 11–5	(Egypt) Ramy Ashour	(France) Grégory Gaultier (England) James Willstrop	(England) Nick Matthew (England) Peter Barker (France) Thierry Lincou (Egypt) Wael El Hindi	(Egypt) Karim Darwish (Malaysia) Ong Beng Hee (Netherlands) Laurens Jan Anjema (Botswana) Alister Walker	(Australia) Cameron Pilley (Egypt) Hisham Mohd Ashour (England) Daryl Selby (Egypt) Tarek Momen

=== Super Series ===
Prize money: $92,500 and more

Tournament	Date	Champion	Runner-up	Semifinalists	Quarterfinalists
Tournament of Champions 2009 (United States) New York City, United States; Super Series Gold $117,500	23–29 January 2009	(France) Grégory Gaultier; 11-9, 2-11, 11-8, 11-4	(England) Nick Matthew	(Egypt) Karim Darwish (Egypt) Ramy Ashour	(England) James Willstrop (Australia) David Palmer (France) Thierry Lincou (Malaysia) Mohd Azlan Iskandar
North American Open 2009 (United States) Richmond, Virginia, United States; World Series Silver $93,750	23–28 February 2009	(Egypt) Ramy Ashour; 11-8, 13-11, 10-12, 5-11, 11-8	(England) Nick Matthew	(Egypt) Karim Darwish (England) Grégory Gaultier	(Egypt) Amr Shabana (Australia) David Palmer (France) Thierry Lincou (Egypt) Wael El Hindi
British Open 2009 (England) Manchester, England; Super Series Silver $92,500	10-14 September 2009	(England) Nick Matthew; 8-11, 11-8, 7-11, 11-3, 12-10	(England) James Willstrop	(Egypt) Amr Shabana (England) Peter Barker	(France) Grégory Gaultier (Australia) David Palmer (Malaysia) Mohd Azlan Iskandar (England) Daryl Selby
Sky Open 2009 (Egypt) Cairo, Egypt; Super Series Platinum $147,500	19-23 September 2009	(Egypt) Karim Darwish; 11-6, 7-11, 6-11, 11-9, 11-3	(France) Grégory Gaultier	(Egypt) Ramy Ashour (Botswana) Alister Walker	(Egypt) Amr Shabana (Egypt) Wael El Hindi (England) James Willstrop (Australia) Cameron Pilley
Hong Kong Open 2009; Hong Kong, China; Super Series Platinum $145,000	14–18 October 2009	(Egypt) Amr Shabana; 11-9, 9-11, 11-3, 5-2 rtd	(France) Grégory Gaultier	(Egypt) Karim Darwish (England) James Willstrop	(Egypt) Ramy Ashour (France) Thierry Lincou (England) Daryl Selby (Malaysia) Mohd Azlan Iskandar
Qatar Classic 2009; Doha, Qatar; Super Series Platinum $147,500	19–23 November 2009	(England) Nick Matthew; 11-5, 12-10, 11-6	(Egypt) Karim Darwish	(Egypt) Ramy Ashour (England) Peter Barker	(Australia) David Palmer (England) James Willstrop (France) Thierry Lincou (Pakistan) Aamir Atlas Khan
PSA Masters 2009 (India) New Delhi, India; Super Series Platinum $152,500	5–10 December 2009	(Egypt) Ramy Ashour; 11-6, 9-11, 11-9, 11-9	(England) Nick Matthew	(Egypt) Amr Shabana (England) Peter Barker	(Australia) David Palmer (France) Thierry Lincou (Egypt) Mohamed El Shorbagy (Netherlands) Laurens Jan Anjema
Saudi International 2009 (Saudi Arabia) Al Khobar, Saudi Arabia; Super Series Platinum $250,000	13–18 December 2009	(Egypt) Ramy Ashour; 11-7, 7-11, 11-9, 9-11, 11-8	(England) Nick Matthew	(Australia) David Palmer (England) Adrian Grant	(France) Thierry Lincou (Egypt) Wael El Hindi (Egypt) Mohamed El Shorbagy (Pakistan) Aamir Atlas Khan

=== World Series Finals ===
Final tournament	Date	Champion	Runner-up	Semifinalists	Round Robin
PSA World Series Finals 2009 (England) Queen's Club, London, England; PSA World Series Finals $110,000	14–17 March 2009	(France) Grégory Gaultier; 11-6, 8-11, 11-5, 11-5	(France) Thierry Lincou	(Egypt) Karim Darwish (Egypt) Amr Shabana	(Egypt) Ramy Ashour (England) James Willstrop (Australia) David Palmer (Egypt) Wael El Hindi

=== Stars ===
Prize money: between $25,000 (2&1/2 Stars) and $50,000 (5 Stars)

==== January ====
Tournament	Date	Champion	Runner-up	Semifinalists	Quarterfinalists
Motor City Open 2009 (United States) Detroit, United States; 3 Stars $30,000	30 January - 2 February 2009	(Spain) Borja Golán; 10-12, 11-9, 11-5, 14-12	(England) Adrian Grant	(Finland) Olli Tuominen (Egypt) Tarek Momen	(Netherlands) Laurens Jan Anjema (Australia) Stewart Boswell (Egypt) Hisham Mohd Ashour (Canada) Shahier Razik

==== February ====
Tournament	Date	Champion	Runner-up	Semifinalists	Quarterfinalists
Swedish Open 2009 (Sweden) Linköping, Sweden; 5 Stars $60,000	5–8 February 2009	(England) Nick Matthew w/o	(Egypt) Karim Darwish	(England) James Willstrop (Egypt) Mohamed El Shorbagy	(Pakistan) Aamir Atlas Khan (Egypt) Omar Mosaad (England) Joey Barrington (Italy) Davide Bianchetti
Bluenose Classic 2009 (Canada) Halifax, Canada; 4 Stars $40,000	5–8 February 2009	(Australia) David Palmer; 11-5, 11-5, 11-7	(England) Peter Barker	(Spain) Borja Golán (Netherlands) Laurens Jan Anjema	(Australia) Cameron Pilley (Colombia) Miguel Ángel Rodríguez (England) Chris Ryder (Canada) Shawn Delierre
Finnish Open 2009 (Finland) Mikkeli, Finland; 2&1/2 Stars $25,000	12–15 February 2009	(Finland) Olli Tuominen; 4-11, 5-11, 11-9, 6-1 rtd	(Australia) Stewart Boswell	(Egypt) Omar Mosaad (Egypt) Omar Abdel Aziz	(Egypt) Hisham Mohd Ashour (Egypt) Mohamed El Shorbagy (Italy) Davide Bianchetti (Hungary) Márk Krajcsák

==== March ====
Tournament	Date	Champion	Runner-up	Semifinalists	Quarterfinalists
Kuala Lumpur Open Squash Championships 2009 (Malaysia) Kuala Lumpur, Malaysia; 5 Stars $50,000	4–7 March 2009	(England) Peter Barker; 11-6, 11-2, 11-4	(England) Adrian Grant	(Malaysia) Ong Beng Hee (Spain) Borja Golán	(Pakistan) Aamir Atlas Khan (Pakistan) Farhan Mehboob (Pakistan) Yasir Ali Butt (England) Chris Simpson
Indian Challenger 2009 (India) Kolkata, India; 3 Stars $30,000	18–21 March 2009	(England) Adrian Grant; 11-8, 11-5, 11-8	(Egypt) Hisham Mohd Ashour	(Malaysia) Ong Beng Hee (Malaysia) Mohd Azlan Iskandar	(Egypt) Mohammed Abbas (India) Saurav Ghosal (Australia) Aaron Frankcomb (India) Amr Swelim
Canary Wharf Squash Classic 2009 (England) Canary Wharf, London, England; 5 Stars $52,500	23–27 March 2009	(Australia) David Palmer; 11-9, 12-10, 8-11, 11-7	(England) James Willstrop	(Egypt) Amr Shabana (France) Grégory Gaultier	(Egypt) Wael El Hindi (England) Peter Barker (Spain) Borja Golán (Egypt) Mohamed El Shorbagy

==== April ====
Tournament	Date	Champion	Runner-up	Semifinalists	Quarterfinalists
Hurghada International 2009 (Egypt) Cairo, Egypt; 5 Stars $61,2500	30 March - 4 April 2009	(Egypt) Ramy Ashour; 7-11, 11-5, 11-3, 11-8	(France) Grégory Gaultier	(Egypt) Karim Darwish (Egypt) Amr Shabana	(Pakistan) Aamir Atlas Khan (Pakistan) Farhan Mehboob (Egypt) Mohamed El Shorbagy (Egypt) Tarek Momen
Irish Squash Open 2009 (Republic of Ireland) Dublin, Ireland; 2&1/2 Stars $25,000	22-25 April 2009	(France) Thierry Lincou; 11-7, 11-6, 11-5	(Egypt) Mohamed El Shorbagy	(England) Daryl Selby (England) Joey Barrington	(Hungary) Márk Krajcsák (France) Julien Balbo (Wales) Rob Sutherland (Switzerland) Nicolas Müller

==== June ====
Tournament	Date	Champion	Runner-up	Semifinalists	Quarterfinalists
Internationaux De La Reunion 2009 (France) Saint-Pierre, Reunion Island, France; 3 Stars $30,000	24–27 June 2009	(France) Thierry Lincou; 13-11, 11-3, 11-7	(Netherlands) Laurens Jan Anjema	(Egypt) Omar Mosaad (Egypt) Mohd Ali Anwar Reda	(France) Renan Lavigne (Australia) Aaron Frankcomb (Republic of Ireland) Liam Kenny (France) Yann Perrin

==== July ====
Tournament	Date	Champion	Runner-up	Semifinalists	Quarterfinalists
Australian Open 2009 (Australia) Clare, Australia; 3 Stars $30,000	16–19 July 2009	(Australia) Stewart Boswell; 11-8, 7-11, 11-8, 10-12, 11-9	(Australia) Cameron Pilley	(Malaysia) Ong Beng Hee (Egypt) Tarek Momen	(Australia) Aaron Frankcomb (New Zealand) Martin Knight (New Zealand) Campbell Grayson (Australia) Scott Arnold
Malaysian Open Squash Championships 2009 (Malaysia) Kuala Lumpur, Malaysia; 5 Stars $52,500	29 July – 1 August 2009	(Egypt) Amr Shabana; 5-11, 11-9, 11-6, 11-4	(England) Nick Matthew	(Egypt) Wael El Hindi (England) James Willstrop	(Egypt) Ong Beng Hee (Pakistan) Aamir Atlas Khan (Pakistan) Farhan Mehboob (Egypt) Omar Mosaad

==== August ====
Tournament	Date	Champion	Runner-up	Semifinalists	Quarterfinalists
Colombian Open 2009 (Colombia) Bogotá, Colombia; 3 Stars $30,000	27–30 August 2009	(Australia) David Palmer; 12-10, 11-13, 12-10, 5-11, 12-12 rtd	(Spain) Borja Golán	(Finland) Olli Tuominen (Colombia) Miguel Ángel Rodríguez	(Malaysia) Mohd Azlan Iskandar (Mexico) Eric Gálvez (Mexico) Arturo Salazar (Mexico) César Salazar

==== September ====
Tournament	Date	Champion	Runner-up	Semifinalists	Quarterfinalists
US Open 2009 (United States) Chicago, United States; 5 Stars $52,500	2-6 September 2009	(Egypt) Amr Shabana; 11-7, 11-2, 7-11, 12-14, 11-8	(Egypt) Ramy Ashour	(Australia) David Palmer (England) James Willstrop	(England) Peter Barker (England) Adrian Grant (Egypt) Wael El Hindi (Finland) Olli Tuominen

==== November ====
Tournament	Date	Champion	Runner-up	Semifinalists	Quarterfinalists
Santiago Open 2009 (Spain) Santiago de Compostela, Spain; 4 Stars $41,250	11–14 November 2009	(England) Peter Barker; 11-9, 11-7, 9-11, 11-9	(England) Adrian Grant	(Australia) Stewart Boswell (France) Renan Lavigne	(Finland) Olli Tuominen (Egypt) Hisham Mohd Ashour (Italy) Davide Bianchetti (India) Saurav Ghosal
Dutch Open Squash 2009 (Netherlands) Rotterdam, Netherlands; 3 Stars $40,000	26–29 November 2009	(England) Daryl Selby; 11-9, 4-11, 11-7, 12-10	(Australia) Cameron Pilley	(Netherlands) Laurens Jan Anjema (Malaysia) Mohd Azlan Iskandar	(England) Tom Richards (Italy) Davide Bianchetti (United States) Julian Illingworth (Germany) Simon Rösner

== Year end world top 10 players ==
Rank	2009	
1	(Egypt) Karim Darwish	940.000
2	(France) Grégory Gaultier	919.375
3	(Egypt) Amr Shabana	916.875
4	(England) Nick Matthew	891.250
5	(Egypt) Ramy Ashour	800.000
6	(England) James Willstrop	573.125
7	(England) Peter Barker	526.000
8	(Australia) David Palmer	491.875
9	(France) Thierry Lincou	443.750
10	(Egypt) Wael El Hindi	332.500

== Retirements ==
Following is a list of notable players (winners of a main tour title, and/or part of the PSA World Rankings top 30 for at least one month) who announced their retirement from professional squash, became inactive, or were permanently banned from playing, during the 2009 season:

- (Scotland) John White (born 15 June 1973 in Mount Isa, Australia) joined the pro tour in 1991, reached the world no. 1 ranking in March 2004. Keeping the spot for two months. In 2002, he was runner-up at both the World Open against David Palmer and the British Open against Peter Nicol. He also has won major tournaments as the PSA Masters, the Davenport Virginia North American Open, the Motor City Open and the Irish Open. He retired in January after competing a last time in the Tournament of Champions.
- Lee Beachill (born 28 November 1977 in Pontefract, England) joined the pro tour in 1998, reached the world no. 1 ranking in October 2004. Keeping the spot for three months. In 2004, he was runner-up of the World Open against Thierry Lincou. He won 8 PSA World Tour titles including the US Open twice and the Qatar Classic. He announced his retirement in February.
- Shahid Zaman (born 12 August 1982 in Quetta, Pakistan) joined the pro tour in 1998, reached the singles no. 14 spot in July 2005. He won 5 PSA World Tour titles including a Pakistan Circuit in 2004 and CAOS International in 2005. He retired after competing in the Atlanta Open in May 2009.

== See also ==
- 2009 Men's World Team Squash Championships
- PSA World Tour
- PSA World Rankings
- PSA World Series Finals
- PSA World Open
