= 2008 Men's World Open Squash Championship =

Men's World Open 2008
- 30th PSA World Squash Championship
- Location: Manchester, England, UK
- Date: 11–19 October 2008
- Website squashsite.co.uk/world_open_2008.htm

PSA World Tour
- Category: PSA World Open
- Prize money: $215,000

Results
- Champion: (Egypt) Ramy Ashour
- Runner-up: (Egypt) Karim Darwish
- Semi-finalists: (Australia) David Palmer (Egypt) Amr Shabana

The 2008 Men's World Open Squash Championship is the men's edition of the World Open, which serves as the individual world championship for squash players. The event took place in the Manchester in England from 11 to 19 October 2008. Ramy Ashour won his first World Open title, defeating Karim Darwish in the final.

== Ranking points ==
In 2008, the points breakdown were as follows:

World Open (2008)
Event	W	F	SF	QF	3R	2R	1R
Points (PSA)	2625	1725	1050	637,5	375	187,5	112,5

== Seeds ==
1. (Egypt) Amr Shabana (semi-finals)
2. (France) Grégory Gaultier (third round)
3. (England) James Willstrop (quarter-finals)
4. (Egypt) Ramy Ashour (champion)
5. (Australia) David Palmer (semi-finals)
6. (France) Thierry Lincou (second round)
7. (Egypt) Karim Darwish (final)
8. (England) Nick Matthew (quarter-finals)
9. (Egypt) Wael El Hindi (third round)
10. (Malaysia) Ong Beng Hee (second round)
11. (Malaysia) Mohd Azlan Iskandar (first round)
12. (England) Peter Barker (third round)
13. (England) Lee Beachill (second round)
14. (England) Adrian Grant (quarter-finals)
15. (Netherlands) Laurens Jan Anjema (third round)
16. (Finland) Olli Tuominen (first round)

== Draws and results ==
=== Finals ===
Quarter finals
1	(Egypt) A Shabana	11	11	11
Q	(Egypt) M E Shorbagy	2	3	6
4	(Egypt) R Ashour	2	11	11	11
8	(England) N Matthew	11	8	9	7
5	(Australia) D Palmer	5	11	9	11	11
3	(England) J Willstrop	11	5	11	4	5
7	(Egypt) K Darwish	12	11	11
14	(England) A Grant	10	7	7

Semi-finals
1	(Egypt) A Shabana	6	11	11	9	7
4	(Egypt) R Ashour	11	7	7	11	11
5	(Australia) D Palmer	6	9	8
7	(Egypt) K Darwish	11	11	11

Final
4	(Egypt) R Ashour	5	11	11	11
7	(Egypt) K Darwish	11	8	4	5

=== Top half ===
==== Section 1 ====
First round
1	(Egypt) A Shabana	6	11	11	11
Q	(Germany) S Rösner	11	5	3	5
(Spain) B Golán	11	11	11
(Canada) S Delierre	4	0	1
9	(Egypt) W E Hindi	12	11	13
Q	(Republic of Ireland) L Kenny	10	5	11
(Egypt) O Mosaad	11	11	r
Q	(Mexico) A Salazar	4	4	r
6	(France) T Lincou	6	11	11	11
(Italy) A Swelim	11	3	1	1
(France) R Lavigne	12	6	11	6	8
Q	(Egypt) M E Shorbagy	10	11	7	11	11
10	(Malaysia) O B Hee	11	9	11	7	11
WC	(England) T Richards	8	11	6	11	8
(Egypt) H Ashour	11	11	11
(England) C Ryder	9	8	5

Second round
1	(Egypt) A Shabana	12	11	11
(Spain) B Golán	7	10	4
9	(Egypt) W E Hindi	11	7	11	11
(Egypt) O Mosaad	7	11	9	8
6	(France) T Lincou	10	6	11	12	11
Q	(Egypt) M E Shorbagy	12	11	7	10	13
10	(Malaysia) O B Hee	12	7	9	9
(Egypt) H Ashour	10	11	11	11

Third round
1	(Egypt) A Shabana	11	2	11	12	11
9	(Egypt) W E Hindi	9	11	4	14	6
Q	(Egypt) M E Shorbagy	11	6	11	10	13
(Egypt) H Ashour	4	11	8	12	11

Quarter finals
1	(Egypt) A Shabana	11	11	11
Q	(Egypt) M E Shorbagy	2	3	6

==== Section 2 ====
First round
4	(Egypt) R Ashour	11	11	12
Q	(France) Y Perrin	6	6	10
(Australia) C Pilley	11	11	11
Q	(Australia) S Arnold	8	8	6
12	(England) P Barker	11	11	11
(Mexico) E Gálvez	4	5	1
(England) J Barrington	11	11	12
(Australia) A Frankcomb	3	3	10
8	(England) N Matthew	11	11	11
Q	(Pakistan) S Zaman	9	7	5
(Australia) S Boswell	11	12	11	11
(Egypt) T Momen	7	14	3	3
15	(Netherlands) L J Anjema	11	11	11
(Brazil) R Alarçón	4	3	7
(Pakistan) F Mehboob	9	11	11	11
(France) J Balbo	11	1	9	7

Second round
4	(Egypt) R Ashour	11	11	11
(Australia) C Pilley	5	4	3
12	(England) P Barker	11	11	11
(England) J Barrington	3	3	2
8	(England) N Matthew	11	11	11	13
(Australia) S Boswell	9	6	9
15	(Netherlands) L J Anjema	9	11	7	15	11
(Pakistan) F Mehboob	11	7	11	13	7

Third round
4	(Egypt) R Ashour	11	11	11	11
12	(England) P Barker	8	13	8	6
8	(England) N Matthew	11	11	11	11
15	(Netherlands) L J Anjema	7	6	13	4

Quarter finals
4	(Egypt) R Ashour	2	11	11	11
8	(England) N Matthew	11	8	9	7

=== Bottom half ===
==== Section 1 ====
First round
Q	(Australia) R Cuskelly	12	10	11	7
(Colombia) M A Rodriguez	14	12	6	11
(England) D Selby	11	11	11
16	(Finland) O Tuominen	8	3	4
(Czech Republic) J Koukal	12	1	3
(England) J Kemp	14	11	11
Q	(Hungary) M Krajcsák	2	8	2
5	(Australia) D Palmer	11	11	11
Q	(Canada) D Phillips	7	11	9	1
(Italy) D Bianchetti	11	9	11	11
13	(England) L Beachill	11	11	11
Q	(England) R Temple	6	3	1
(Scotland) J White	13	11	11
(Pakistan) M Zaman	11	6	2
Q	(England) B Ford	4	7	5
3	(England) J Willstrop	11	11	11

Second round
(Colombia) M A Rodriguez	6	2	3
(England) D Selby	11	11	11
(England) J Kemp	6	4	7	10
5	(Australia) D Palmer	11	12	11	12
(Italy) D Bianchetti	11	11	10	13
13	(England) L Beachill	9	6	12	11
(Scotland) J White	2	11	10	9
3	(England) J Willstrop	11	3	12	11

Third round
(England) D Selby	5	13	3	10
5	(Australia) D Palmer	11	11	11	12
(Italy) D Bianchetti	7	11	8
3	(England) J Willstrop	11	13	11

Quarter finals
5	(Australia) D Palmer	5	11	9	11	11
3	(England) J Willstrop	11	5	11	4	5

==== Section 2 ====
First round
(United States) J Illingworth	5	11	3	4
(England) A Walker	11	8	11	11
(New Zealand) K Shuja	11	8	11	11
11	(Malaysia) A Iskandar	5	11	3	4
Q	(France) M Castagnet	5	11	9	12	7
(Pakistan) A A Khan	11	9	11	10	11
Q	(Netherlands) D Bennett	5	0	3
7	(Egypt) K Darwish	11	11	11
Q	(Mexico) J Baltazar	11	11	5	12	11
(Egypt) M Abbas	13	7	11	10	9
(Egypt) O A Aziz	11	12	11	11
14	(England) A Grant	9	14	5	7
(India) S Ghosal	10	10	4
(Canada) S Razik	12	12	11
Q	(Switzerland) N Müller	6	10	9
2	(France) G Gaultier	11	12	11

Second round
(England) A Walker	8	11	11	11
(New Zealand) K Shuja	11	1	5	5
(Pakistan) A A Khan	5	0	3
7	(Egypt) K Darwish	11	11	11
Q	(Mexico) J Baltazar	10	2	13	2
14	(England) A Grant	12	11	11	11
(Canada) S Razik	6	6	3
2	(France) G Gaultier	11	11	11

Third round
(England) A Walker	11	8	5	8
7	(Egypt) K Darwish	9	11	11	11
14	(England) A Grant	9	12	14	1	13
2	(France) G Gaultier	11	10	12	11	11

Quarter finals
7	(Egypt) K Darwish	12	11	11
14	(England) A Grant	10	7	7

== See also ==
- World Open
- 2008 Women's World Open Squash Championship

Preceded by Bermuda (Hamilton); 2007	PSA World Open; England (Manchester); 2008	Succeeded by Kuwait (Kuwait City) 2009
