= 2009 Men's World Open Squash Championship =

Men's World Open 2009
- 31st PSA World Squash Championship
- Location: Kuwait City, Kuwait
- Date: November 1–7, 2009
- Website www.squashsite.co.uk/2009/kuwait_09.htm

PSA World Tour
- Category: PSA World Open
- Prize money: $277,500

Results
- Champion: (Egypt) Amr Shabana
- Runner-up: (Egypt) Ramy Ashour
- Semi-finalists: (France) Grégory Gaultier (England) James Willstrop

The 2009 Men's World Open Squash Championship is the men's edition of the World Open, which serves as the individual world championship for squash players. The event took place in the Kuwait City in Kuwait from 1 to 7 November 2009. Amr Shabana won his fourth World Open title, defeating Ramy Ashour in the final.

== Ranking points ==
In 2009, the points breakdown were as follows:

World Open (2009)
| Event | W | F | SF | QF | 3R | 2R | 1R |
| Points (PSA) | 2625 | 1725 | 1050 | 637,5 | 375 | 187,5 | 112,5 |

== Seeds ==
1. (Egypt) Karim Darwish (third round)
2. (France) Grégory Gaultier (semifinals)
3. (Egypt) Ramy Ashour (final)
4. (Egypt) Amr Shabana (champion)
5. (England) Nick Matthew (quarterfinals)
6. (Australia) David Palmer (second round)
7. (England) Peter Barker (quarterfinals)
8. (France) Thierry Lincou (quarterfinals)
9. (Egypt) Wael El Hindi (quarterfinals)
10. (England) Adrian Grant (second round)
11. (England) James Willstrop (semifinals)
12. (Malaysia) Mohd Azlan Iskandar (second round)
13. (Malaysia) Ong Beng Hee (third round)
14. (Netherlands) Laurens Jan Anjema (third round)
15. (Botswana) Alister Walker (third round)
16. (Egypt) Mohamed El Shorbagy (second round)

== Draws & Results ==
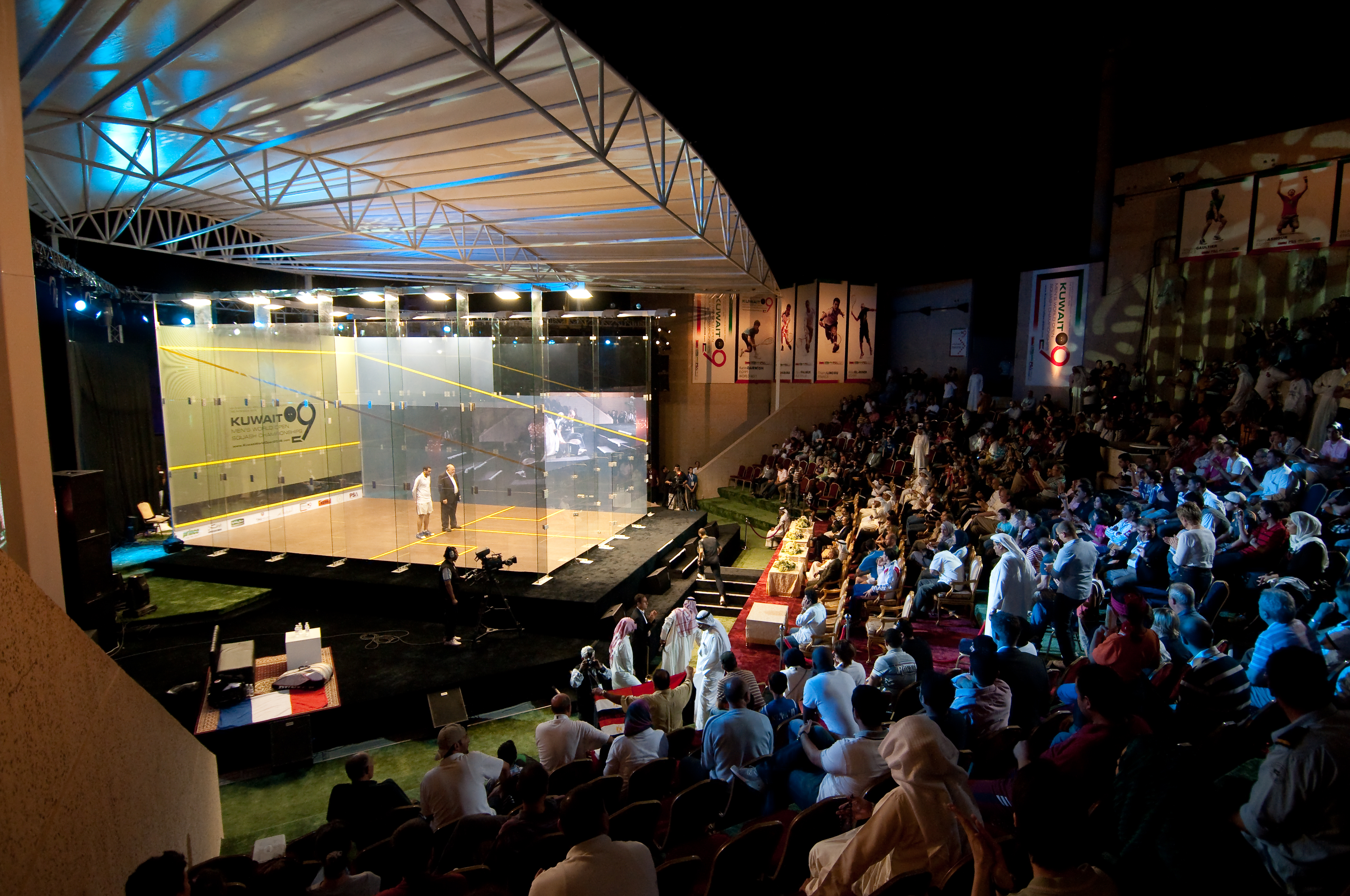
2009 PSA Kuwait World Open

=== Finals ===
Quarter finals
11 | (England) James Willstrop | 11 | 11 | 11
8 | (France) Thierry Lincou | 9 | 5 | 5
4 | (Egypt) Amr Shabana | 11 | 11 | 11
9 | (Egypt) Wael El Hindi | 1 | 5 | 9
7 | (England) Peter Barker | 8 | 3 | 11 | 8
3 | (Egypt) Ramy Ashour | 11 | 11 | 9 | 11
5 | (England) Nick Matthew | 11 | 8 | 11 | 6 | 4
2 | (France) Grégory Gaultier | 8 | 11 | 2 | 11 | 11

Semi finals
11 | (England) James Willstrop | 5 | 9 | 11 | 9
4 | (Egypt) Amr Shabana | 11 | 11 | 6 | 11
3 | (Egypt) Ramy Ashour | 11 | 11 | 12
2 | (France) Grégory Gaultier | 5 | 9 | 10

Final
4 | (Egypt) Amr Shabana | 11 | 11 | 11
3 | (Egypt) Ramy Ashour | 8 | 8 | 5

=== Top half ===
==== Section 1 ====
First round
1 | (Egypt) Karim Darwish | 17 | 11 | 11
(Pakistan) Mansoor Zaman | 15 | 4 | 7
29 | (India) Saurav Ghosal | 0 | 11 | 11 | 11
Q | (France) Mathieu Castagnet | 11 | 6 | 8 | 8
11 | (England) James Willstrop | 13 | 11 | 11
Q | (England) Robbie Temple | 11 | 7 | 0
28 | (England) Jonathan Kemp | 11 | 11 | 11
(Mexico) Arturo Salazar | 7 | 4 | 5
8 | (France) Thierry Lincou | 11 | 11 | 11
Q | (Pakistan) Yasir Butt | 5 | 7 | 3
18 | (Australia) Stewart Boswell | 11 | 12 | 11
Q | (Australia) Scott Arnold | 8 | 10 | 6
15 | (England) Alister Walker | 11 | 11 | 6 | 11
(Hungary) Márk Krajcsák | 6 | 6 | 11 | 5
30 | (Canada) Shahier Razik | 9 | 11 | 5 | 3
(France) Renan Lavigne | 11 | 9 | 11 | 11

Second round
1 | (Egypt) Karim Darwish | 11 | 11 | 9 | 11
29 | (India) Saurav Ghosal | 4 | 5 | 11 | 1
14 | (England) James Willstrop | 11 | 11 | 11
28 | (England) Jonathan Kemp | 5 | 5 | 5
8 | (France) Thierry Lincou | 7 | 11 | 11 | 11
18 | (Australia) Stewart Boswell | 11 | 6 | 8 | 1
15 | (England) Alister Walker | 11 | 11 | 7 | 11
(France) Renan Lavigne | 7 | 7 | 11 | 9

Third round
1 | (Egypt) Karim Darwish | 7 | 7 | 11 | 9
11 | (England) James Willstrop | 11 | 11 | 3 | 11
8 | (France) Thierry Lincou | 11 | 11 | 4 | 11
15 | (England) Alister Walker | 2 | 8 | 11 | 6

Quarter finals
11 | (England) James Willstrop | 11 | 11 | 11
8 | (France) Thierry Lincou | 9 | 5 | 5

==== Section 2 ====
First round
4 | (Egypt) Amr Shabana | 11 | 11 | 11
Q | (South Africa) Shaun Le Roux | 6 | 5 | 6
24 | (Egypt) Omar Mosaad | 11 | 10 | 11 | 9 | 11
WC | (Kuwait) Abdullah Al Muzayen | 9 | 12 | 6 | 11 | 8
12 | (Malaysia) Mohd Azlan Iskandar | 11 | 11 | 11
(Australia) Aaron Frankcomb | 6 | 4 | 2
22 | (England) Daryl Selby | 11 | 11 | 11
Q | (South Africa) Stephen Coppinger | 8 | 6 | 6
6 | (Australia) David Palmer | 11 | 11 | 11
Q | (France) Julien Balbo | 5 | 4 | 6
25 | (Egypt) Tarek Momen | 11 | 11 | 11
(England) Ben Ford | 9 | 3 | 6
9 | (Egypt) Wael El Hindi | 9 | 11 | 11 | 9 | 11
(Italy) Stéphane Galifi | 11 | 8 | 3 | 11 | 6
26 | (England) Joey Barrington | 8 | 10 | 9
(Italy) Amr Swelim | 11 | 12 | 11

Second round
4 | (Egypt) Amr Shabana | 11 | 11 | 11
24 | (Egypt) Omar Mosaad | 8 | 8 | 6
12 | (Malaysia) Mohd Azlan Iskandar | 7 | 11 | 11 | 7 | 8
22 | (England) Daryl Selby | 11 | 7 | 9 | 11 | 11
6 | (Australia) David Palmer | 12 | 10 | 7
25 | (Egypt) Tarek Momen | 14 | 12 | 11
9 | (Egypt) Wael El Hindi | 11 | 11 | 11
(Italy) Amr Swelim | 7 | 7 | 7

Third round
4 | (Egypt) Amr Shabana | 11 | 11 | 11
22 | (England) Daryl Selby | 9 | 6 | 8
25 | (Egypt) Tarek Momen | 12 | 6 | 7 | 6
9 | (Egypt) Wael El Hindi | 10 | 11 | 11 | 11

Quarter finals
4 | (Egypt) Amr Shabana | 11 | 11 | 11
9 | (Egypt) Wael El Hindi | 1 | 5 | 9

=== Bottom half ===
==== Section 1 ====
First round
(England) Chris Simpson | 11 | 12 | 6 | 8 | 5
21 | (Egypt) Hisham Ashour | 6 | 10 | 11 | 11 | 11
(England) Chris Ryder | 7 | 6 | 6
10 | (England) Adrian Grant | 11 | 11 | 11
Q | (New Zealand) Martin Knight | 6 | 7 | 9
19 | (Finland) Olli Tuominen | 11 | 11 | 11
(Switzerland) Nicolas Müller | 7 | 2 | 10
7 | (England) Peter Barker | 11 | 11 | 11
(Germany) Simon Rösner | 9 | 9 | 5
17 | (Pakistan) Aamir Atlas Khan | 11 | 11 | 11
(Denmark) Rasmus Nielsen | 13 | 6 | 5
14 | (Netherlands) Laurens Jan Anjema | 15 | 11 | 11
(Egypt) Omar Abdel Aziz | 11 | 11 | 15
23 | (Colombia) Miguel Á. Rodríguez | 5 | 6 | 13
(Mexico) Jorge Baltazar | 11 | 0 | ret
3 | (Egypt) Ramy Ashour | 13 | 0

Second round
21 | (Egypt) Hisham Ashour | 13 | 12 | 11
10 | (England) Adrian Grant | 11 | 10 | 9
19 | (Finland) Olli Tuominen | 5 | 4 | 2
7 | (England) Peter Barker | 11 | 11 | 11
17 | (Pakistan) Aamir Atlas Khan | 6 | 11 | 2 | 5
14 | (Netherlands) Laurens Jan Anjema | 11 | 8 | 11 | 11
(Egypt) Omar Abdel Aziz | 10 | 8 | 3
3 | (Egypt) Ramy Ashour | 12 | 11 | 11

Third round
21 | (Egypt) Hisham Ashour | 6 | 5 | 11 | 9
7 | (England) Peter Barker | 11 | 11 | 8 | 11
14 | (Netherlands) Laurens Jan Anjema | 5 | 11 | 5 | 7
3 | (Egypt) Ramy Ashour | 11 | 7 | 11 | 11

Quarter finals
7 | (England) Peter Barker | 8 | 3 | 11 | 8
3 | (Egypt) Ramy Ashour | 11 | 11 | 9 | 11

==== Section 2 ====
First round
Q | (England) Joe Lee | 6 | 4 | 10
20 | (Australia) Cameron Pilley | 11 | 11 | 11
Q | (Malaysia) Mohd Nafi. Adnan | 7 | 5 | 5
16 | (Egypt) Mohd El Shorbagy | 11 | 11 | 11
Q | (France) Yann Perrin | 13 | 6 | 11 | 2
27 | (Italy) Davide Bianchetti | 15 | 11 | 6 | 11
Q | (Republic of Ireland) John Rooney | 6 | ret
5 | (England) Nick Matthew | 11
Q | (Republic of Ireland) Arthur Gaskin | 7 | 11 | 2 | 0
31 | (England) Tom Richards | 11 | 7 | 11 | 11
(Egypt) Mohd Ali Anwar Reda | 12 | 11 | 6 | 8
13 | (Malaysia) Ong Beng Hee | 14 | 6 | 11 | 11
(New Zealand) Kashif Shuja | 5 | 8 | 10
32 | (United States) Julian Illingworth | 11 | 11 | 12
Q | (Scotland) Alan Clyne | 2 | 5 | 7
2 | (France) Grégory Gaultier | 11 | 11 | 11

Second round
20 | (Australia) Cameron Pilley | 9 | 8 | 11 | 11 | 11
16 | (Egypt) Mohd El Shorbagy | 11 | 11 | 3 | 4 | 3
27 | (Italy) Davide Bianchetti | 2 | 3 | 6
5 | (England) Nick Matthew | 11 | 11 | 11
31 | (England) Tom Richards | 11 | 4 | 4 | 9
13 | (Malaysia) Ong Beng Hee | 7 | 11 | 11 | 11
32 | (United States) Julian Illingworth | 3 | 8 | 11 | 3
2 | (France) Grégory Gaultier | 11 | 11 | 8 | 11

Third round
20 | (Australia) Cameron Pilley | 6 | 3 | 2
5 | (England) Nick Matthew | 11 | 11 | 11
13 | (Malaysia) Ong Beng Hee | 4 | 5 | 9
2 | (France) Grégory Gaultier | 11 | 11 | 11

Quarter finals
5 | (England) Nick Matthew | 11 | 8 | 11 | 6 | 4
2 | (France) Grégory Gaultier | 8 | 11 | 2 | 11 | 11

== See also ==
- World Open
- 2009 Women's World Open Squash Championship
- 2009 Men's World Team Squash Championships

| Preceded by England (Manchester); 2008 | PSA World Open; Kuwait (Kuwait City); 2009 | Succeeded by Saudi Arabia (Al Khobar) 2010 |
