= 2005 Men's World Open Squash Championship =

Sport tournament

Men's World Open 2005
- 27th PSA World Squash Championship
- Location: Hong Kong
- Date: November 29 - December 4, 2005
- Website www.squashtalk.com/hongkong/2005/hh2005-5.htm

PSA World Tour
- Category: PSA World Open
- Prize money: $170,000

Results
- Champion: (Egypt) Amr Shabana
- Runner-up: (Australia) David Palmer
- Semi-finalists: (England) Peter Nicol (England) James Willstrop

The 2005 Men's World Open Squash Championship is the men's edition of the World Open, which serves as the individual world championship for squash players. The event took place in Hong Kong from 29 November to 4 December 2005. Amr Shabana won his second World Open title, defeating David Palmer in the final.

== Ranking points ==
In 2005, the points breakdown were as follows:

World Open (2005)
| Event | W | F | SF | QF | 2R | 1R |
| Points (PSA) | 2187,5 | 1437,5 | 875 | 531,25 | 312,5 | 156,25 |

== Seeds ==
1. (France) Thierry Lincou (quarterfinals)
2. (Canada) Jonathon Power (quarterfinals)
3. (Australia) David Palmer (final)
4. (England) Lee Beachill (quarterfinals)
5. (Egypt) Amr Shabana (champion)
6. (England) Peter Nicol (semifinals)
7. (Australia) Anthony Ricketts (quarterfinals)
8. (England) James Willstrop (semifinals)
9. (Egypt) Karim Darwish (second round)
10. (France) Grégory Gaultier (second round)
11. (Scotland) John White (second round)
12. (England) Nick Matthew (second round)
13. (Malaysia) Mohd Azlan Iskandar (second round)
14. (Canada) Graham Ryding (first round)
15. (Finland) Olli Tuominen (second round)
16. (Pakistan) Shahid Zaman (second round)

== Draws & Results ==
First round
1 | (France) Thierry Lincou | 11 | 11 | 11
(Egypt) Wael El Hindi | 5 | 9 | 6
10 | (France) Grégory Gaultier | 11 | 11
Q | (Egypt) Ramy Ashour | 5 | 2
6 | (England) Peter Nicol | 7 | 11 | 11 | 11
(England) Adrian Grant | 11 | 9 | 6 | 6
16 | (Pakistan) Shahid Zaman | 13 | 11 | 10 | 4 | 11
Q | (France) Renan Lavigne | 11 | 4 | 12 | 11 | 8
4 | (England) Lee Beachill | 11 | 11 | 10 | 14
(Australia) Joe Kneipp | 2 | 7 | 12 | 12
11 | (Scotland) John White | 11 | 11 | 10 | 14
Q | (Wales) Alex Gough | 5 | 6 | 12 | 12
5 | (Egypt) Amr Shabana | 6 | 11 | 11 | 11
Q | (England) Simon Parke | 11 | 5 | 7 | 2
15 | (Finland) Olli Tuominen | 11 | 11 | 10 | 11
Q | (England) Joey Barrington | 6 | 7 | 12 | 3
(Pakistan) Mansoor Zaman | 9 | 11 | 4 | 3
9 | (Egypt) Karim Darwish | 11 | 9 | 11 | 11
(England) Peter Barker | 7 | 7 | 9
7 | (Australia) Anthony Ricketts | 11 | 11 | 11
Q | (Egypt) Hisham Ashour | 11 | 3 | 5 | 11
13 | (Malaysia) Mohd Azlan Iskandar | 8 | 11 | 11 | 13
Q | (Netherlands) Laurens Jan Anjema | 9 | 5 | 6
3 | (Australia) David Palmer | 11 | 11 | 11
(Egypt) Mohammed Abbas | 8 | 2 | 17 | 5
12 | (England) Nick Matthew | 11 | 11 | 15 | 11
WC | (Hong Kong) Wong Wai Hang | 10 | 6 | 8
8 | (England) James Willstrop | 12 | 11 | 11
Q | (Australia) Stewart Boswell | 8 | 12 | 11 | 11
14 | (Canada) Graham Ryding | 11 | 10 | 7 | 3
(Malaysia) Ong Beng Hee | 3 | 1 | 6
2 | (Canada) Jonathon Power | 11 | 11 | 11

Second round
1 | (France) Thierry Lincou | 7 | 11 | 8 | 11 | 11
10 | (France) Grégory Gaultier | 11 | 9 | 11 | 4 | 8
6 | (England) Peter Nicol | 11 | 11 | 11
16 | (Pakistan) Shahid Zaman | 6 | 8 | 5
4 | (England) Lee Beachill | 11 | 11 | 10 | 11
11 | (Scotland) John White | 6 | 3 | 12 | 5
5 | (Egypt) Amr Shabana | 11 | 11 | 11
15 | (Finland) Olli Tuominen | 3 | 2 | 8
9 | (Egypt) Karim Darwish | 8 | 9 | 3
7 | (Australia) Anthony Ricketts | 11 | 11 | 11
13 | (Malaysia) Mohd Azlan Iskandar | 7 | 9 | 7
3 | (Australia) David Palmer | 11 | 11 | 11
12 | (England) Nick Matthew | 11 | 11 | 4 | 8 | 6
8 | (England) James Willstrop | 7 | 9 | 11 | 11 | 11
Q | (Australia) Stewart Boswell | 8 | 11 | 5 | 9
2 | (Canada) Jonathon Power | 11 | 5 | 11 | 11

Quarter finals
1 | (France) Thierry Lincou | 11 | 3 | 5 | 9
6 | (England) Peter Nicol | 8 | 11 | 11 | 11
4 | (England) Lee Beachill | 5 | 7 | 4
5 | (Egypt) Amr Shabana | 11 | 11 | 11
7 | (Australia) Anthony Ricketts | 9 | 11 | 9 | 11 | 8
3 | (Australia) David Palmer | 11 | 2 | 11 | 7 | 11
8 | (England) James Willstrop | 11 | 7 | 11 | 11
2 | (Canada) Jonathon Power | 6 | 11 | 6 | 6

Semi finals
6 | (England) Peter Nicol | 8 | 2 | 6
5 | (Egypt) Amr Shabana | 11 | 11 | 11
Final
5 | (Egypt) Amr Shabana | 11 | 11 | 11
3 | (Australia) David Palmer | 6 | 7 | 8
3 | (Australia) David Palmer | 11 | 13 | 12
8 | (England) James Willstrop | 9 | 11 | 10

== See also ==
- World Open
- 2005 Women's World Open Squash Championship
- 2005 Men's World Team Squash Championships

| Preceded by Qatar (Doha); 2004 | PSA World Open; Hong Kong; 2005 | Succeeded by Egypt (Cairo); 2006 |
