= 2007 Men's World Open Squash Championship =

Men's World Open 2007
- 29th PSA World Squash Championship
- Location: Bermuda
- Date: November 25 - December 1, 2007
- Website squashworldopen.com

PSA World Tour
- Category: PSA World Open
- Prize money: $175,000

Results
- Champion: (Egypt) Amr Shabana
- Runner-up: (France) Grégory Gaultier
- Semi-finalists: (Australia) David Palmer (England) Nick Matthew

The 2007 Men's World Open Squash Championship is the men's edition of the World Open, which serves as the individual world championship for squash players. The event took place in the Bermuda from 25 November to 1 December 2007. Amr Shabana won his third World Open title, defeating Grégory Gaultier in the final.

== Ranking points ==
In 2007, the points breakdown were as follows:

World Open (2007)
Event	W	F	SF	QF	2R	1R
Points (PSA)	2187,5	1437,5	875	531,25	312,5	156,25

== Seeds ==
1. (Egypt) Amr Shabana (champion)
2. (France) Grégory Gaultier (final)
3. (Australia) David Palmer (semifinals)
4. (England) James Willstrop (quarterfinals)
5. (France) Thierry Lincou (quarterfinals)
6. (Scotland) John White (quarterfinals)
7. (England) Nick Matthew (semifinals)
8. (England) Lee Beachill (first round)
9. (Egypt) Wael El Hindi (second round)
10. (Australia) Stewart Boswell (second round)
11. (England) Peter Barker (second round)
12. (Egypt) Mohammed Abbas (second round)
13. (Malaysia) Mohd Azlan Iskandar (second round)
14. (Finland) Olli Tuominen (first round)
15. (Malaysia) Ong Beng Hee (first round)
16. (England) Adrian Grant (first round)

== Draws & Results ==
First round
1	(Egypt) Amr Shabana	11	11	7	11
(France) Renan Lavigne	9	8	11	9
10	(Australia) Stewart Boswell	11	11	11
WC	(Bermuda) James Stout	5	3	4
15	(Malaysia) Ong Beng Hee	8	7	11	4
(England) Jonathan Kemp	11	11	8	11
5	(France) Thierry Lincou	11	11	5	11
(United States) Julian Illingworth	5	3	11	0
3	(Australia) David Palmer	11	11	11
(Canada) Shawn Delierre	4	4	5
11	(England) Peter Barker	8	11	12	11
(England) Bradley Ball	11	8	10	5
(Wales) Alex Gough	4	11	5	11	11
8	(England) Lee Beachill	11	8	11	4	5
9	(Egypt) Wael El Hindi	9	11	5	12	12
(Mexico) Eric Gálvez	11	6	11	10	10
2	(France) Grégory Gaultier	11	11	11
(England) Daryl Selby	4	7	0
(Egypt) Hisham Ashour	11	11	4	11
16	(England) Adrian Grant	7	7	11	8
6	(Scotland) John White	11	11	11
(England) Alister Walker	8	4	5
13	(Malaysia) Mohd Azlan Iskandar	10	11	9	11	11
(Canada) Shahier Razik	11	6	11	3	6
7	(England) Nick Matthew	11	8	11	11
(England) Joey Barrington	1	11	6	2
(Egypt) Omar Mosaad	1	11	11	11
14	(Finland) Olli Tuominen	11	4	9	4
4	(England) James Willstrop	10	8	11	11	11
(Netherlands) Laurens Jan Anjema	11	11	8	9	3
12	(Egypt) Mohammed Abbas	11	11	11
(Australia) Cameron Pilley	8	6	8

Second round
1	(Egypt) Amr Shabana	8	11	11	9	11
10	(Australia) Stewart Boswell	11	4	2	11	4
(England) Jonathan Kemp	0	5	5
5	(France) Thierry Lincou	11	11	11
3	(Australia) David Palmer	12	11	11
11	(England) Peter Barker	10	7	9
(Wales) Alex Gough	11	7	11	11
9	(Egypt) Wael El Hindi	1	11	4	7
2	(France) Grégory Gaultier	11	11	11
(Egypt) Hisham Ashour	4	8	4
6	(Scotland) John White	7	11	7	12	11
13	(Malaysia) Mohd Azlan Iskandar	11	5	11	10	6
7	(England) Nick Matthew	11	11	11
(Egypt) Omar Mosaad	6	9	7
4	(England) James Willstrop	3	9	11	11	11
12	(Egypt) Mohammed Abbas	11	11	7	8	5

Quarter finals
1	(Egypt) Amr Shabana	10	11	11	11
5	(France) Thierry Lincou	12	6	10	5
3	(Australia) David Palmer	11	11	11
(Wales) Alex Gough	5	4	4
2	(France) Grégory Gaultier	12	11	11
6	(Scotland) John White	10	6	5
7	(England) Nick Matthew	11	11	11
4	(England) James Willstrop	8	6	4

Semi finals
1	(Egypt) Amr Shabana	11	3	11	11
3	(Australia) David Palmer	6	11	5	5
Final
1	(Egypt) Amr Shabana	11	11	11
2	(France) Grégory Gaultier	7	4	6
2	(France) Grégory Gaultier	11	11	11
7	(England) Nick Matthew	6	4	8

== See also ==
- World Open
- 2007 Women's World Open Squash Championship
- 2007 Men's World Team Squash Championships

Preceded by Egypt (Cairo); 2006	PSA World Open; Bermuda (Hamilton); 2007	Succeeded by England (Manchester) 2008
