= 2006 Men's World Open Squash Championship =

Men's World Open 2006
- 28th PSA World Squash Championship
- Location: Cairo, Egypt
- Date: September 1–6, 2006
- Website www.squashsite.co.uk/world_open_2006.htm

PSA World Tour
- Category: PSA World Open
- Prize money: $152,500

Results
- Champion: (Australia) David Palmer
- Runner-up: (France) Grégory Gaultier
- Semi-finalists: (Egypt) Amr Shabana (France) Thierry Lincou

The 2006 Men's World Open Squash Championship is the men's edition of the World Open, which serves as the individual world championship for squash players. The event took place just in front of the pyramids in Cairo in Egypt from 1 September to 6 September 2006. David Palmer won his second World Open title, defeating Grégory Gaultier in the final.

== Ranking points ==
In 2006, the points breakdown were as follows:

World Open (2006)
Event	W	F	SF	QF	2R	1R
Points (PSA)	2187,5	1437,5	875	531,25	312,5	156,25

== Seeds ==
1. (Egypt) Amr Shabana (semifinals)
2. (Australia) David Palmer (champion)
3. (France) Thierry Lincou (semifinals)
4. (England) James Willstrop (first round)
5. (Australia) Anthony Ricketts (quarterfinals)
6. (England) Peter Nicol (quarterfinals)
7. (England) Nick Matthew (second round)
8. (France) Grégory Gaultier (final)
9. (Egypt) Karim Darwish (first round)
10. (England) Lee Beachill (second round)
11. (Scotland) John White (second round)
12. (Malaysia) Mohd Azlan Iskandar (first round)
13. (Malaysia) Ong Beng Hee (second round)
14. (Finland) Olli Tuominen (second round)
15. (Australia) Stewart Boswell (second round)
16. (England) Adrian Grant (second round)

== Draws & Results ==
First round
1	(Egypt) Amr Shabana	11	5	11	11
Q	(England) Peter Barker	7	11	4	6
(Egypt) Mohammed Abbas	11	11	5	13
12	(Malaysia) Mohd Azlan Iskandar	8	5	11	13
7	(England) Nick Matthew	13	11	11
(Wales) Alex Gough	11	3	3
9	(Egypt) Karim Darwish	11	3	5	10
(Egypt) Wael El Hindi	5	11	11	12
4	(England) James Willstrop	w/o
(Egypt) Ramy Ashour
10	(England) Lee Beachill	11	11	11
Q	(Spain) Borja Golán	7	5	7
8	(France) Grégory Gaultier	11	11	11
Q	(Egypt) Tarek Momen	6	5	6
11	(Scotland) John White	11	11	7	8	11
Q	(Netherlands) Laurens Jan Anjema	6	6	11	11	8
Q	(Egypt) Hisham Ashour	9	5	8
15	(Australia) Stewart Boswell	11	11	11
(Canada) Graham Ryding	4	11	9	11	10
6	(England) Peter Nicol	11	5	11	9	12
(Canada) Shahier Razik	11	9	11	7	12
14	(Finland) Olli Tuominen	8	11	5	11	14
Q	(England) Alister Walker	11	7	2	6
3	(France) Thierry Lincou	4	11	11	11
Q	(Italy) Davide Bianchetti	11	8	5	11	5
16	(England) Adrian Grant	7	11	11	9	11
WC	(Egypt) Omar Mosaad	7	5	13	3
5	(Australia) Anthony Ricketts	11	11	11	11
(Australia) Cameron Pilley	5	7	3
13	(Malaysia) Ong Beng Hee	11	11	11
Q	(Pakistan) Aamir Atlas Khan	4	3	1
2	(Australia) David Palmer	11	11	11

Second round
1	(Egypt) Amr Shabana	11	5	11	13
(Egypt) Mohammed Abbas	6	11	9	11
7	(England) Nick Matthew	8	11	4	11	10
(Egypt) Wael El Hindi	11	4	11	2	12
(Egypt) Ramy Ashour	11	10	6	11	11
10	(England) Lee Beachill	4	12	11	8	5
8	(France) Grégory Gaultier	11	11	11
11	(Scotland) John White	3	6	8
15	(Australia) Stewart Boswell	11	10	7	2
6	(England) Peter Nicol	7	12	11	11
14	(Finland) Olli Tuominen	10	11	3	8
3	(France) Thierry Lincou	12	9	11	11
16	(England) Adrian Grant	6	11	6	8
5	(Australia) Anthony Ricketts	11	9	11	11
13	(Malaysia) Ong Beng Hee	12	8	8
2	(Australia) David Palmer	14	11	11

Quarter finals
1	(Egypt) Amr Shabana	11	11	11
(Egypt) Wael El Hindi	5	7	5
(Egypt) Ramy Ashour	11	9	2
8	(France) Grégory Gaultier	13	11	11
6	(England) Peter Nicol	6	11	9	6
3	(France) Thierry Lincou	11	5	11	11
5	(Australia) Anthony Ricketts	11	3	6	7
2	(Australia) David Palmer	9	11	11	11

Semi finals
1	(Egypt) Amr Shabana	5	7	11	9
8	(France) Grégory Gaultier	11	11	2	11
Final
8	(France) Grégory Gaultier	11	11	9	14	2
2	(Australia) David Palmer	9	9	11	16	11
3	(France) Thierry Lincou	2	10	12	5
2	(Australia) David Palmer	11	12	10	11

== See also ==
- World Open
- 2006 Women's World Open Squash Championship

Preceded by Hong Kong; 2005	PSA World Open; Egypt (Cairo); 2006	Succeeded by Bermuda (Hamilton); 2007
