= 2004 Men's World Open Squash Championship =

Men's World Open 2004
- 26th PSA World Squash Championship
- Location: Doha, Qatar
- Date: November 28 - December 3, 2004
- Website www.squashsite.co.uk/qatarworldopen.htm

PSA World Tour
- Category: PSA World Open
- Prize money: $120,000

Results
- Champion: (France) Thierry Lincou
- Runner-up: (England) Lee Beachill
- Semi-finalists: (Australia) David Palmer (Canada) Graham Ryding

The 2004 Men's World Open Squash Championship is the men's edition of the World Open, which serves as the individual world championship for squash players. The event took place in Doha in Qatar from 28 November to 3 December 2004. Thierry Lincou won his first World Open title, defeating Lee Beachill in the final.

== Ranking points ==
In 2004, the points breakdown were as follows:

World Open (2004)
Event	W	F	SF	QF	2R	1R
Points (PSA)	2187,5	1437,5	875	531,25	312,5	156,25

== Seeds ==
1. (England) Lee Beachill (final)
2. (France) Thierry Lincou (champion)
3. (England) Peter Nicol (quarterfinals)
4. (Australia) David Palmer (semifinals)
5. (England) Nick Matthew (first round)
6. (Egypt) Amr Shabana (quarterfinals)
7. (Scotland) John White (first round)
8. (Egypt) Karim Darwish (second round)
9. (Canada) Jonathon Power (second round)
10. (Australia) Joe Kneipp (second round)
11. (France) Grégory Gaultier (second round)
12. (England) James Willstrop (quarterfinals)
13. (England) Adrian Grant (second round)
14. (Australia) Anthony Ricketts (quarterfinals)
15. (Egypt) Omar El Borolossy (first round)
16. (Egypt) Mohammed Abbas (second round)

== Draws and results ==
First round
1	(England) Lee Beachill	11	11	15
(Italy) Davide Bianchetti	4	5	13
10	(Australia) Joe Kneipp	11	11	11
Q	(Malaysia) Mohd Azlan Iskandar	9	7	6
8	(Egypt) Karim Darwish	8	11	11	11
(England) Simon Parke	11	9	8	7
12	(England) James Willstrop	11	11	11
Q	(South Africa) Rodney Durbach	9	4	5
4	(Australia) David Palmer	11	11	11
Q	(Netherlands) Tommy Berden	9	9	6
13	(England) Adrian Grant	11	11	11
(France) Renan Lavigne	7	9	9
6	(Egypt) Amr Shabana	11	8	3	11	11
(England) Mark Chaloner	4	11	11	7	5
16	(Egypt) Mohammed Abbas	11	11	11
Q	(Egypt) Wael El Hindi	4	5	2
Q	(Wales) Alex Gough	4	11	11	11
15	(Egypt) Omar El Borolossy	11	9	3	3
(Canada) Graham Ryding	6	11	7	11	11
5	(England) Nick Matthew	11	8	11	9	6
(Australia) Dan Jenson	5	7	8
9	(Canada) Jonathon Power	11	11	11
Q	(Egypt) Mohd Essam Hafiz	7	6	5
3	(England) Peter Nicol	11	11	11
(Malaysia) Ong Beng Hee	8	5	7
14	(Australia) Anthony Ricketts	11	11	11
(Finland) Olli Tuominen	12	11	11
7	(Scotland) John White	10	5	2
Q	(England) Jonathan Kemp	8	11	11	6	9
11	(France) Grégory Gaultier	11	2	5	11	11
(England) Bradley Ball	6	6	8
2	(France) Thierry Lincou	11	11	11

Second round
1	(England) Lee Beachill	14	11	11
10	(Australia) Joe Kneipp	12	6	4
8	(Egypt) Karim Darwish	11	6	7	7
12	(England) James Willstrop	6	11	11	11
4	(Australia) David Palmer	11	11	11
13	(England) Adrian Grant	5	4	7
6	(Egypt) Amr Shabana	11	11	5	11
16	(Egypt) Mohammed Abbas	7	5	11	6
Q	(Wales) Alex Gough	10	5	3
(Canada) Graham Ryding	12	11	11
9	(Canada) Jonathon Power	11	8	5	4
3	(England) Peter Nicol	7	11	11	11
14	(Australia) Anthony Ricketts	11	2	7	11	11
(Finland) Olli Tuominen	5	11	11	4	5
11	(France) Grégory Gaultier	8	11	8	6
2	(France) Thierry Lincou	11	6	11	11

Quarter finals
1	(England) Lee Beachill	11	11	11
12	(England) James Willstrop	7	4	9
4	(Australia) David Palmer	6	7	11	11	12
6	(Egypt) Amr Shabana	11	11	2	8	10
(Canada) Graham Ryding	11	11	9	11
3	(England) Peter Nicol	6	7	11	3
14	(Australia) Anthony Ricketts	10	7	11	11	3
2	(France) Thierry Lincou	12	11	7	8	11

Semi finals
1	(England) Lee Beachill	11	11	5	12
4	(Australia) David Palmer	8	6	11	10
Final
1	(England) Lee Beachill	11	2	11	10	8
2	(France) Thierry Lincou	5	11	2	12	11
(Canada) Graham Ryding	11	3	4	11	10
2	(France) Thierry Lincou	6	11	11	7	12

== See also ==
- PSA World Open
- 2004 Women's World Open Squash Championship

Preceded by Pakistan (Lahore); 2003	PSA World Open; Qatar (Doha); 2006	Succeeded by Hong Kong; 2005
