= 2010 Men's World Open Squash Championship =

Men's World Open 2010
- 32nd PSA World Squash Championship
- Location: Al Khobar, Saudi Arabia
- Date: December 2–10, 2010
- Website www.atcosquash.com

PSA World Tour
- Category: PSA World Open
- Prize money: $327,500

Results
- Champion: (England) Nick Matthew
- Runner-up: (England) James Willstrop
- Semi-finalists: (Egypt) Amr Shabana (England) Peter Barker

The 2010 Men's World Open Squash Championship is the men's edition of the 2010 World Open, which serves as the individual world championship for squash players. The event took place at the Sunset Beach Resort in Khobar, Saudi Arabia from 2 to 10 December 2010. Nick Matthew won his first World Open title, defeating James Willstrop in the final.

== Prize money and ranking points ==
For 2010, the prize purse was $327,500. The prize money and points breakdown is as follows:

Prize Money World Open (2010)
Event	W	F	SF	QF	3R	2R	1R
Points (PSA)	2625	1725	1050	637,5	375	187,5	112,5
Prize money	$48,400	$30,250	$18,150	$10,590	$6,050	$3,025	$1,515

== Seeds ==
1. (England) Nick Matthew (champion)
2. (Egypt) Ramy Ashour (second round)
3. (Egypt) Amr Shabana (semifinals)
4. (Egypt) Karim Darwish (quarterfinals)
5. (France) Grégory Gaultier (quarterfinals)
6. (England) James Willstrop (final)
7. (France) Thierry Lincou (second round)
8. (England) Peter Barker (semifinals)
9. (England) Daryl Selby (third round)
10. (Australia) David Palmer (third round)
11. (Egypt) Wael El Hindi (third round)
12. (Netherlands) Laurens Jan Anjema (second round)
13. (Egypt) Mohamed El Shorbagy (quarterfinals)
14. (Malaysia) Mohd Azlan Iskandar (third round)
15. (England) Adrian Grant (second round)
16. (England) Alister Walker (third round)

== Draw and results ==
=== Finals ===
Quarter finals
1	(England) Nick Matthew	11	11	11
7	(France) Thierry Lincou	3	5	2
3	(Egypt) Amr Shabana	6	13	4
5	(France) Grégory Gaultier	11	11	0
8	(England) Peter Barker	11	6	6
4	(Egypt) Karim Darwish	7	11	7
6	(England) James Willstrop	11	11	11
13	(Egypt) Mohamed El Shorbagy	9	8	8

Semi finals
1	(England) Nick Matthew	11	12	12
3	(Egypt) Amr Shabana	6	10	10
8	(England) Peter Barker	11	12	4	8
6	(England) James Willstrop	8	14	11	11

Final
1	(England) Nick Matthew	8	11	11	11
6	(England) James Willstrop	11	6	2	3

=== Top half ===
==== Section 1 ====
First round
1	(England) Nick Matthew	11	11	11
(Australia) Ryan Cuskelly	4	5	6
26	(Canada) Shahier Razik	12	11	11
Q	(England) Joe Lee	10	7	6
12	(Netherlands) Laurens Jan Anjema	11	11	9	9	11
Q	(Egypt) Mohammed Abbas	5	8	11	11	8
23	(Egypt) Hisham M Ashour	11	11	12
(England) Chris Ryder	4	5	10
7	(France) Thierry Lincou	11	11	11
Q	(New Zealand) Kashif Shuja	4	4	7
21	(Egypt) Omar Mosaad	11	11	4	11
Q	(France) Julien Balbo	7	5	11	5
16	(England) Alister Walker	12	12	11	11
(South Africa) Stephen Coppinger	14	10	9	9
28	(England) Joey Barrington	11	11	11
Q	(Scotland) Alan Clyne	7	5	6

Second round
1	(England) Nick Matthew	11	11	11
26	(Canada) Shahier Razik	5	1	7
12	(Netherlands) Laurens Jan Anjema	7	9	7
23	(Egypt) Hisham M Ashour	11	11	11
7	(France) Thierry Lincou	11	11	11
21	(Egypt) Omar Mosaad	6	8	3
16	(England) Alister Walker	11	11	11
28	(England) Joey Barrington	3	4	3

Third round
1	(England) Nick Matthew	11	11	13	'
23	(Egypt) Hisham M Ashour	8	6	11
7	(France) Thierry Lincou	11	11	7	11
16	(England) Alister Walker	5	9	11	9

Quarter finals
1	(England) Nick Matthew	11	11	11
7	(France) Thierry Lincou	3	5	2

==== Section 2 ====
First round
3	(Egypt) Amr Shabana	11	12	11
(England) Chris Simpson	7	10	8
29	(Egypt) Mohd Anwar Reda	11	11	4	11
(Egypt) Karim Abdel Gawad	1	8	11	4
14	(Malaysia) Mohd Azlan Iskandar
Q	(Czech Republic) Jan Koukal	rtd
30	(Colombia) Miguel Rodriguez	8	5	4
(Hungary) Márk Krajcsák	11	11	11
5	(France) Grégory Gaultier	11	11	11
WC	(Saudi Arabia) M Taher Al-Saif	3	5	8
29	(Pakistan) Farhan Mehboob	11	11	9	11
(Malaysia) Muhd Asyraf Azan	6	8	11	5
10	(Australia) David Palmer	11	11	12
Q	(Italy) Stéphane Galifi	3	2	10
20	(England) Jonathan Kemp	11	11	11
(Brazil) Rafael Alarçón	2	5	9

Second round
3	(Egypt) Amr Shabana	11	11	11
29	(Egypt) Mohd Anwar Reda	7	1	7
14	(Malaysia) Mohd Azlan Iskandar	13	11	11
(Hungary) Márk Krajcsák	11	5	7
5	(France) Grégory Gaultier	11	11	11
29	(Pakistan) Farhan Mehboob	6	5	3
10	(Australia) David Palmer	11	3	11	10	11
20	(England) Jonathan Kemp	4	11	7	12	4

Third round
3	(Egypt) Amr Shabana	11	11	10	7	11
14	(Malaysia) Mohd Azlan Iskandar	4	8	12	11	5
5	(France) Grégory Gaultier	9	11	11	11
10	(Australia) David Palmer	11	7	8	2

Quarter finals
3	(Egypt) Amr Shabana	11	13	4
5	(France) Grégory Gaultier	6	10	0

=== Bottom half ===
==== Section 1 ====
First round
(Italy) Davide Bianchetti	rtd
18	(Australia) Stewart Boswell
(France) Renan Lavigne	4	9	10
15	(England) Adrian Grant	11	11	12
Q	(England) Robbie Temple	6	5	11	6
(Germany) Simon Rösner	11	11	8	11
Q	(Malaysia) Mohd N Adnan	4	3	3
8	(England) Peter Barker	11	11	11
(Australia) Aaron Frankcomb	11	12	11
19	(Egypt) Tarek Momen	8	10	8
(France) Grégoire Marche	11	10	9	6
11	(Egypt) Wael El Hindi	7	12	11	11
(England) Adrian Waller	11	11	3	8	5
31	(England) Tom Richards	9	6	11	11	11
(United States) Julian Illingworth	3	5	13	3
4	(Egypt) Karim Darwish	11	11	11	11

Second round
18	(Australia) Stewart Boswell	11	8	11	11	6
15	(England) Adrian Grant	9	11	13	3	0
(Germany) Simon Rösner	10	5	5
8	(England) Peter Barker	12	11	11
(Australia) Aaron Frankcomb	7	6	6
11	(Egypt) Wael El Hindi	11	11	11
31	(England) Tom Richards	7	9	5
4	(Egypt) Karim Darwish	11	11	11

Third round
18	(Australia) Stewart Boswell	6	6	9	'
8	(England) Peter Barker	11	11	11
11	(Egypt) Wael El Hindi	4	3	3
4	(Egypt) Karim Darwish	11	11	11

Quarter finals
8	(England) Peter Barker	11	6	7
4	(Egypt) Karim Darwish	7	11	6

==== Section 2 ====
First round
(Egypt) Omar Abdel Aziz	12	11	6	8
24	(Finland) Olli Tuominen	14	5	11	11
(New Zealand) Campbell Grayson	5	3	5
9	(England) Daryl Selby	11	11	11
(Spain) Borja Golán	11	7	11	11
25	(India) Saurav Ghosal	4	11	9	5
(Switzerland) Nicolas Müller	11	4	7	2
6	(England) James Willstrop	9	11	11	11
Q	(France) Mathieu Castagnet	11	8	11	11
17	(Australia) Cameron Pilley	3	11	9	5
(New Zealand) Martin Knight	6	9	9
13	(Egypt) M El Shorbagy	11	11	11
Q	(Australia) Steven Finitsis	5	10	5
22	(Pakistan) Aamir Atlas Khan	11	12	11
Q	(Denmark) Kristian Frost Olesen	1	5	11	9
2	(Egypt) Ramy Ashour	11	11	5	11

Second round
24	(Finland) Olli Tuominen	4	7	6
9	(England) Daryl Selby	11	11	11
(Spain) Borja Golán	6	3	3
6	(England) James Willstrop	11	11	11
Q	(France) Mathieu Castagnet	6	10	11	9
13	(Egypt) M El Shorbagy	11	12	8	11
22	(Pakistan) Aamir Atlas Khan	11
2	(Egypt) Ramy Ashour	2

Third round
9	(England) Daryl Selby	8	11	9	7	'
6	(England) James Willstrop	11	7	11	11
13	(Egypt) M El Shorbagy	11	11	11
22	(Pakistan) Aamir Atlas Khan	8	6	8

Quarter finals
6	(England) James Willstrop	11	11	11
13	(Egypt) M El Shorbagy	9	8	8

== See also ==
- World Open
- 2010 Women's World Open Squash Championship

Preceded by Kuwait (Kuwait City); 2009	PSA World Open; Saudi Arabia (Al Khobar); 2010	Succeeded by Netherlands (Rotterdam) 2011
