= 2010 World Open =

2010 World Open may refer to:

- 2010 World Open (snooker), professional ranking snooker tournament
- 2010 Men's World Open Squash Championship, the individual world championship for men's squash players
- 2010 Women's World Open Squash Championship, the individual world championship for women's squash players
