= Squash at the 2005 World Games – men's singles =

Squash men's singles at the 2005 World Games
- Venue: Squash Center MH; Duisburg, Germany
- Dates: 16–19 July 2005
- Competitors: 16 from 8 nations

Medalists
gold medal	(United Kingdom) Peter Nicol
silver medal	(France) Thierry Lincou
bronze medal	(United Kingdom) Nick Matthew
bronze medal	(United Kingdom) James Willstrop

The Squash - Single Men competition at the World Games 2005 took place from July 16 to July 19 in Duisburg in Germany.

== Seeds ==
1. (France) Thierry Lincou (Final)
2. (United Kingdom) Peter Nicol (Champion)
3. (United Kingdom) James Willstrop (Semifinals)
4. (United Kingdom) Nick Matthew (Semifinals)
5. (Egypt) Karim Darwish (Quarterfinals)
6. (Australia) Joe Kneipp (Quarterfinals)
7. (Malaysia) Ong Beng Hee (Quarterfinals)
8. (Germany) Hansi Seestaller (Quarterfinals)

== Draw ==
Round of 16
1	(France) Thierry Lincou	9	9	9
(Germany) Stefan Leifels	3	2	2
(Austria) Andreas Fuchs	3	4	4
8	(Germany) Hansi Seestaller	9	9	9
6	(Australia) Joe Kneipp	9	9	9	9
(Sweden) Christian Drakenberg	10	1	1	0
(Hungary) Márk Krajcsák	9	7	0	4
4	(United Kingdom) Nick Matthew	7	9	9	9
3	(United Kingdom) James Willstrop	9	9	9
(Germany) Patrick Gässler	3	4	6
(South Africa) Rodney Durbach	9	4	4	3
7	(Malaysia) Ong Beng Hee	6	9	9	9
5	(Egypt) Karim Darwish	9	9	9
(Mexico) Eric Gálvez	2	3	2
(Canada) Matthew Giuffre	1	1	3
2	(United Kingdom) Peter Nicol	9	9	9

Quarter finals
1	(France) Thierry Lincou	9	9	9
8	(Germany) Hansi Seestaller	2	0	3
6	(Australia) Joe Kneipp	6	6	3
4	(United Kingdom) Nick Matthew	9	9	9
3	(United Kingdom) James Willstrop	10	2	9	9
7	(Malaysia) Ong Beng Hee	8	9	1	4
5	(Egypt) Karim Darwish	5	6	3
2	(United Kingdom) Peter Nicol	9	9	9

Semi finals
1	(France) Thierry Lincou	3	10	9	9
4	(United Kingdom) Nick Matthew	9	9	3	2
3	(United Kingdom) James Willstrop	2	4	8
2	(United Kingdom) Peter Nicol	9	9	10

Finals
1	(France) Thierry Lincou	3	0	4
2	(United Kingdom) Peter Nicol	9	9	9

Note: * w/d = Withdraw, * w/o = Walkover, * r = Retired
