= David Palmer (squash player) =

Australian squash player

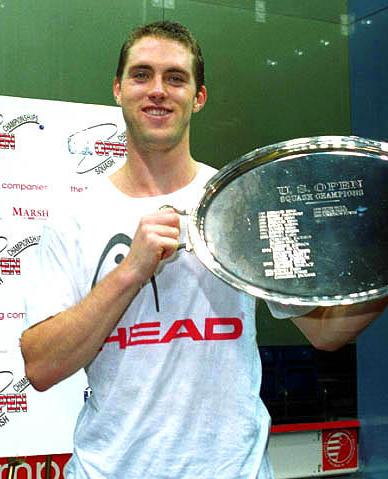
- Palmer holding a plate trophy after winning the 2002 US Open.

Personal information
- Full name: David Troy Palmer
- Nickname: The Marine
- Born: 28 June 1976 (age 50) Lithgow, New South Wales
- Height: 1.88 m (6 ft 2 in)
- Weight: 82 kg (181 lb)
- Website: www.davidpalmer.com

Sport
- Country: Australia
- Handedness: Right handed
- Turned pro: 1994
- Coached by: Shaun Moxham
- Retired: 2011
- Racquet used: Black Knight Ion X-Force Yellow

Men's singles
- Highest ranking: No. 1 (September 2001, February 2006)
- Title: 27
- Tour final: 53
- World Open: W (2002, 2006)
Medal record
Men's squash
Representing Australia
World Championships
Gold medal – first place	2002 Antwerp	Singles
Gold medal – first place	2006 Doha	Singles
Silver medal – second place	2005 Hong Kong	Singles
Bronze medal – third place	2004 Doha	Singles
Bronze medal – third place	2007 Bermuda	Singles
Bronze medal – third place	2008 Manchester	Singles
World Team Championships
Gold medal – first place	2001 Melbourne	Team
Gold medal – first place	2003 Vienna	Team
Silver medal – second place	2007 Chennai	Team
Bronze medal – third place	2009 Odense	Team
Bronze medal – third place	2011 Paderborn	Team
World Doubles Championships
Gold medal – first place	2004 Chennai	Mixed doubles
Silver medal – second place	2016 Darwin	Doubles
Bronze medal – third place	2016 Darwin	Mixed doubles
Bronze medal – third place	2017 Manchester	Mixed doubles
Commonwealth Games
Gold medal – first place	2014 Glasgow	Doubles
Gold medal – first place	2014 Glasgow	Mixed doubles
Gold medal – first place	2018 Gold Coast	Doubles
Silver medal – second place	2006 Melbourne	Singles
Silver medal – second place	2010 New Delhi	Doubles
Bronze medal – third place	2002 Manchester	Singles
Bronze medal – third place	2002 Manchester	Doubles
Bronze medal – third place	2006 Melbourne	Doubles
Bronze medal – third place	2006 Melbourne	Mixed doubles
- Updated on 12 April 2022

David Troy Palmer OAM (born 28 June 1976 in Lithgow, New South Wales) is an Australian retired professional squash player. He won the Super Series finals in 2002, the World Open in 2002 and 2006; the British Open in 2001, 2003, 2004 and 2008; and the Australian Open in 2008. He attained World No. 1 ranking in September 2001 and again (for one month) in February 2006.

== Career overview ==
At the 2018 Commonwealth Games, Palmer won a Gold Medal with partner Zac Alexander in the men's doubles. At the 2006 Commonwealth Games, Palmer won a men's singles Silver Medal after losing in the final to England's Peter Nicol. At the same 2006 Commonwealth Games he also won Bronze Medals in the men's doubles (partner Dan Jensen) and the mixed doubles (partner Rachael Grinham). In the 2002 Commonwealth Games he won Bronze Medals in both the men's singles and the men's doubles (partner Paul Price).

In technical terms, Palmer plays a classic all-court attrition game with hard-hitting attacking shots from his opponent's loose shots. He is known for the power of his striking, and the strength of his physical play, contributed to by rigorous attention to fitness. His training regime involves completing the multi-stage fitness test five times with a three-minute break between tests.

Palmer has served as president of the Professional Squash Association (PSA). Following the 2004 World Doubles Squash Championships in Chennai, India, he was banned from playing in events run by the World Squash Federation (WSF) for 13 months after a disciplinary panel found him guilty of verbally abusing the referee.

In 2009, Palmer was approached by the Wallabies coach Robbie Deans to help increase his team fitness.

Following his retirement as a professional squash player in 2011, Palmer maintained his status as a successful, high-level coach at his David Palmer Squash Academy in Orlando, Florida. In November 2016, Palmer made his college squash coaching debut as he was named The James Broadhead '57 Head Coach of Squash at Cornell University. Palmer now leads both the men's and women's squash team at Cornell University in Ithaca, New York.

== World Open final appearances ==
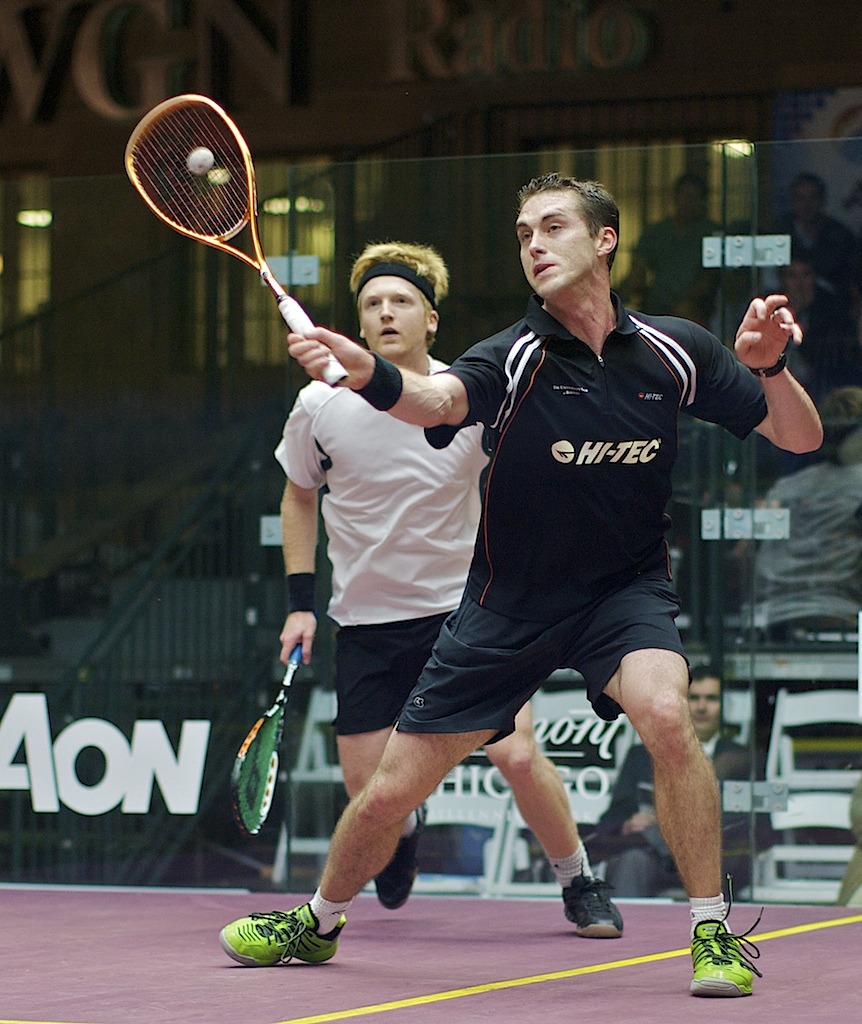
David Palmer & Tom Richards in action.

=== 2 titles & 1 runner-up ===
Outcome	Year	Location	Opponent in the final	Score in the final
Winner	2002	Antwerp, Belgium	(Scotland) John White	13–15, 12–15, 15–6, 15–14, 15–11
Runner-up	2005	Hong Kong	(Egypt) Amr Shabana	11–6, 11–7, 11–8
Winner	2006	Doha, Qatar	(France) Grégory Gaultier	9–11, 9–11, 11–9, 16–14, 11–2

== Major World Series final appearances ==
=== British Open: 4 finals (4 titles, 0 runner-up) ===
Outcome	Year	Opponent in the final	Score in the final
Winner	2001	(England) Chris Walker	12–15, 13–15, 15–2, 15–9, 15–5
Winner	2003	(England) Peter Nicol	15–13, 15–13, 15–8
Winner	2004	(Egypt) Amr Shabana	14–16, 11–7, 13–11, 11–7
Winner	2008	(England) James Willstrop	11–9, 11–9, 8–11, 6–11, 13–11

=== Hong Kong Open: 1 final (1 title, 0 runner-up) ===
Outcome	Year	Opponent in the final	Score in the final
Winner	2001	(France) Thierry Lincou	15–13, 15–6, 15-9

=== Qatar Classic: 4 finals (0 title, 4 runner-up) ===
Outcome	Year	Opponent in the final	Score in the final
Runner-up	2001	(England) Peter Nicol	15–12, 15–5, 10–15, 12–15, 15-10
Runner-up	2002	(England) Peter Nicol	15–9, 13–15, 15–6, 13–15, 15-7
Runner-up	2005	(England) James Willstrop	11–1, 11–7, 11-7
Runner-up	2007	(Egypt) Ramy Ashour	8-11, 11–9, 11–9, 11-6

=== US Open: 3 finals (1 title, 2 runner-up) ===
Outcome	Year	Opponent in the final	Score in the final
Winner	2002	(Australia) Stewart Boswell	15–13, 15–10, 15-11
Runner-up	2003	(England) Peter Nicol	15–10, 14–15, 15–14, 17-15
Runner-up	2005	(England) Lee Beachill	11–7, 9-11, 8-11, 11–1, 11-8

== Commonwealth Games final appearances ==
2006 Melbourne Games, Men's Singles Runners-up (1)
Year	Opponent in final	Score in final
2006	(England) Peter Nicol	9–5, 10–8, 4–9, 9–2

2018 Gold Coast Games, Winner (1) Men's Doubles with Zac Alexander
Year	Opponent in final	Score in final
2018	(England) Daryl Selby and Adrian Waller	11–9, 3-11, 11-6

Total medals won, 1 Gold, 1 Silver, 4 Bronze

== Career statistics ==
=== Singles performance timeline (since 1999) ===
Terms
W–L	Win–loss	NWS	Not a World Series event
NG50	Not an international event	NH	Not held
A	Absent	LQ/#Q	Lost in qualifying draw and round number
RR	Lost at round robin stage	#R	Lost in the early rounds
QF	Quarterfinalist	SF	Semifinalist
SF-B	Semifinalist, won bronze medal	F	Runner-up
F	Runner-up, won silver medal	W	Winner

To prevent confusion and double counting, information in this table is updated only once a tournament or the player's participation in the tournament has concluded.

Tournament	1999	2000	2001	2002	2003	2004	2005	2006	2007	2008	2009	2010	2011	Career SR	Career W-L
PSA World Tour Tournaments
World Open	3R	Not Held		W	3R	SF	F	W	SF	SF	2R	3R	QF	2 / 11	35–9
British Open	2R	SF	W	2R	W	W	A	SF	SF	W	QF	Not Held		4 / 10	31–6
Hong Kong Open	1R	2R	W	SF	NH	SF	NH	SF	SF	QF	2R	2R	A	1 / 10	21–9
Qatar Classic	Not Held		F	F	QF	NH	F	F	SF	QF	QF	2R	2R	0 / 10	27–10
PSA Masters	NH	1R	F	SF	A	F	2R	QF	Not Held		QF	Absent		0 / 7	16–7
Tournament of Champions	NA	2R	1R	2R	SF	2R	SF	2R	QF	SF	QF	QF	QF	0 / 12	21-12
North American Open	Not Held					Not World Series		Absent		2R	QF	2R	QF	0 / 4	6–4
Kuwait PSA Cup	Not Held					1R	A	NH	SF	2R	NH	Absent		0 / 3	4–3
US Open	Absent		NH	W	F	SF	F	SF	A	NH	SF	A	2R	1 / 7	18–6
Saudi International	Not Held						2R	SF	SF	SF	SF	Not Held		0 / 5	13–5
Pakistan International	A	Not Held		SF	NH	QF	F	A	NH	NWS	Not Held			0 / 3	9–3
Win Ratio	0 / 3	0 / 5	2 / 5	2 / 8	1 / 6	1 / 8	0 / 7	1 / 8	0 / 6	1 / 7	0 / 9	0 / 5	0 / 5	8 / 82 (9,8%)	NA
Win–loss	3 / 3	5 / 5	18 / 3	25 / 6	14 / 5	19 / 7	20 / 7	23 / 7	20 / 6	21 / 6	17 / 9	7 / 5	9 / 5	NA	201 / 74 (73,1%)

Note: NA = Not Available

== See also ==
- Official Men's Squash World Ranking

Sporting positions
Preceded by Peter Nicol; Jonathon Power	World No. 1 September 2001 - December 2001; February 2006	Succeeded by Peter Nicol; Jonathon Power
