= Amr Shabana =

Egyptian squash player

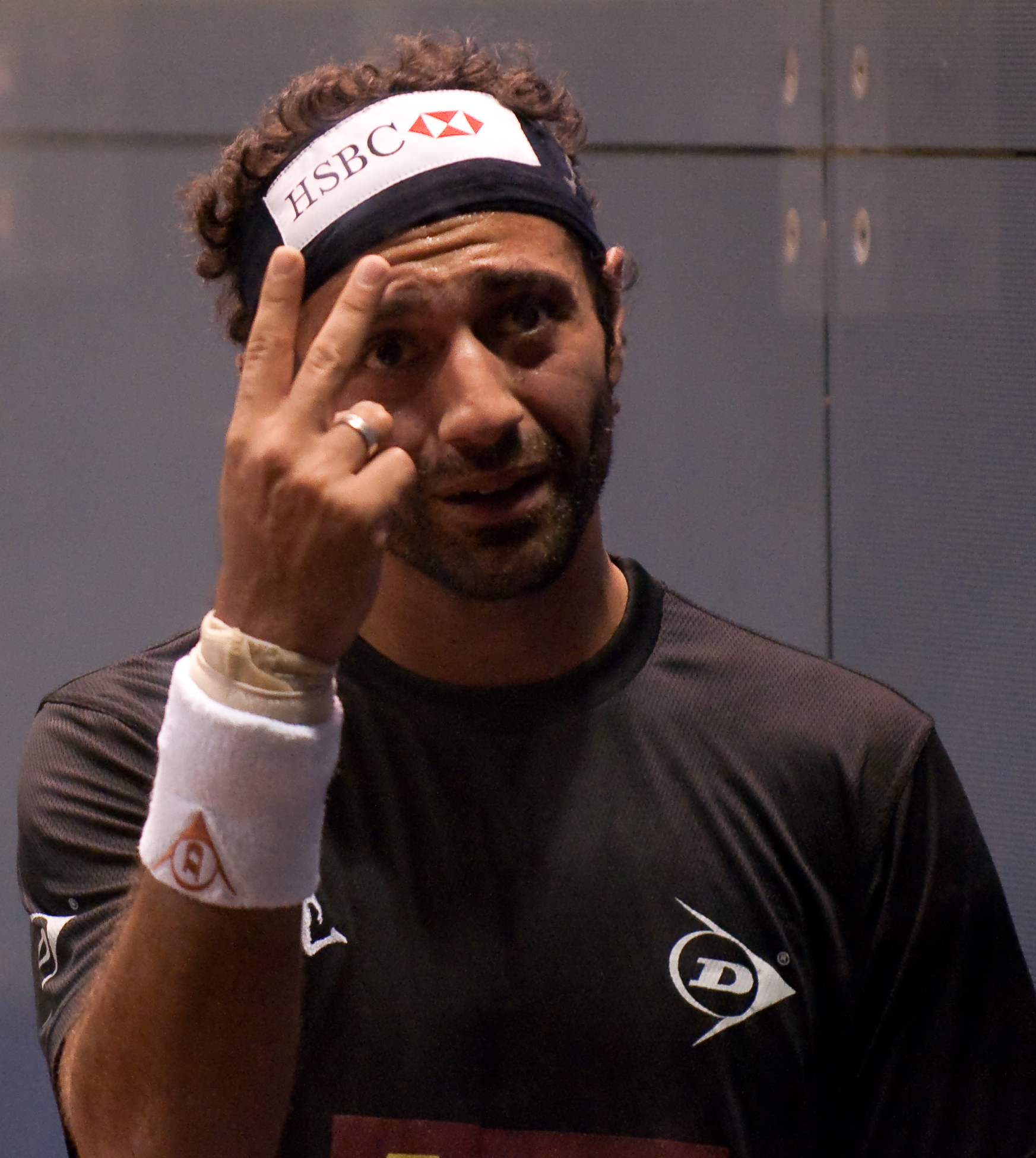
- Amr Shabana reacts during his 2009 Kuwait Open semi-final match.

Personal information
- Nickname: The Maestro
- Born: July 20, 1979 (age 47) Cairo, Egypt
- Height: 1.73 m (5 ft 8 in)
- Weight: 73 kg (161 lb)

Sport
- Country: Egypt
- Handedness: Left Handed
- Turned pro: 1995
- Retired: August 2015
- Racquet used: Eye Rackets

Men's singles
- Highest ranking: No. 1 (April, 2006)
- Current ranking: Retired (Ended 10)
- Title: 33
- Tour final: 45
- World Open: W (2003, 2005, 2007, 2009)
Medal record
Men's squash
Representing Egypt
World Championships
Gold medal – first place	2003 Lahore	Singles
Gold medal – first place	2005 Hong Kong	Singles
Gold medal – first place	2007 Bermuda	Singles
Gold medal – first place	2009 Kuwait	Singles
Bronze medal – third place	2006 Doha	Singles
Bronze medal – third place	2008 Manchester	Singles
Bronze medal – third place	2010 Khobar	Singles
World Team Championships
Gold medal – first place	2009 Odense	Team
Silver medal – second place	2001 Melbourne	Team
Silver medal – second place	2005 Islamabad	Team
- Updated on July 2015

Amr Shabana (Arabic: عمرو شبانة; born 20 July 1979 in Cairo) is a former professional squash player from Egypt. He won the World Open in 2003, 2005, 2007 and 2009, and reached the World No. 1 ranking in 2006.

He represented the winning Egyptian team in the 1999 Men's World Team Squash Championships held in Cairo and the 2009 Men's World Team Squash Championships held in Denmark. Shabana's accomplishments in professional squash lead many to regard him as one of the greatest players of all time.

== Career overview ==
The talented left-hander from Cairo first showed his promise when he was the runner-up (to compatriot Ahmed Faizy) in the British Under-14 Open in January 1993. Four years later he reached the final of the British Under-19 Open, where he again lost to Faizy.

A PSA member since 1995, Amr claimed his first Tour title with the help of Bryan "Griffin" Knight in July 1999, winning the Puebla Open final against Australia's Craig Rowland in Mexico. Seven days later he grabbed his second, the Mexico Open, again by beating Rowland in the final.

Amr Shabana crowned a remarkable year in 2003 when, as ninth seed, he forced his way through a star-studded field in the World Open in Pakistan. He dispatched title-holder David Palmer, the third seed, in five games in the third round. He then went on to take out Palmer's Australian teammate Anthony Ricketts in the last eight. After defeating Karim Darwish (the Egyptian No 1) in a four-game semi-final, Shabana clinched the historic title by beating Thierry Lincou in the final 15–14, 9–15, 15–11, 15–7, to become Egypt's first winner of the sport's premier title.

But after a disappointing following year, in which his only final appearance was in the British Open Squash Championship in England, losing to David Palmer in four games 10–11 (4–6), 11–7, 11–10 (3–1), 11–7, Shabana stormed back to the top of his game in 2005. Over a short period, he acquired a new coach, Ahmed Tahir; a new manager, the former Egyptian international Omar Elborolossy; and a wife, Nadjla. "All I have to worry about now is playing my matches – everything else is looked after for me now", said Shabana. And the effect was plain to see as a week after winning the Heliopolis Open in his home town Cairo, the seventh-seeded Shabana beat David Palmer and James Willstrop, before defeating Anthony Ricketts in the final to claim the St Louis Open crown in the United States.

The next event saw the in-form Egyptian brush aside all opposition in the Hungarian Open in Budapest, winning his third title in as many weeks after beating Grégory Gaultier in the final. But the World Open in Hong Kong confirmed his renaissance beyond doubt. Seeded five, Amr crushed fourth seed Lee Beachill in the quarters, Peter Nicol in the semis, and, in his third successive straight games victory, powered past David Palmer 11–6 11–7 11–8 in the final to become the first player since the heyday of the Khans to win the World Open title for the second time.

The new year brought continuing rewards for Shabana with victories in the Canadian Classic in January, followed by the Tournament of Champions in New York in March, and the Bermuda PSA Masters in April – bringing his PSA Tour title tally to 12, and then in April 2006, Shabana became the first Egyptian player to reach the world number 1 ranking.

In 2007, Shabana was crowned world champion for the third time in five years at the World Open in Bermuda and later in January 2009, Shabana's 33-month reign as World No. 1 was ended by his countryman Karim Darwish.

In 2014, Shabana became the oldest professional to win a World Series title by defeating Grégory Gaultier in the finals of Tournament of Champions.

On the 27th of August 2015, Shabana announced his retirement from competitive professional squash.

== World Open final appearances ==
=== 4 titles & 0 runner-up ===
Outcome	Year	Location	Opponent in the final	Score in the final
Winner	2003	Lahore, Pakistan	(France) Thierry Lincou	15–11, 11–15, 15–8, 15–14
Winner	2005	Hong Kong	(Australia) David Palmer	11–6, 11–7, 11–8
Winner	2007	Bermuda	(France) Grégory Gaultier	11–7, 11–4, 11–6
Winner	2009	Kuwait	(Egypt) Ramy Ashour	11–8, 11–5, 11–5

== Major World Series final appearances ==
=== British Open: 1 final (0 title, 1 runner-up) ===
Outcome	Year	Opponent in the final	Score in the final
Runner-up	2004	(Australia) David Palmer	14–16, 11–7, 13–11, 11–7

=== Hong Kong Open: 4 finals (4 titles, 0 runner-up) ===
Outcome	Year	Opponent in the final	Score in the final
Winner	2006	(Egypt) Ramy Ashour	13-11, 3-11, 11-5, 13-11
Winner	2007	(France) Grégory Gaultier	11-13, 11-3, 11-6, 13-11
Winner	2008	(France) Grégory Gaultier	11-9, 13-15, 8-11, 11-2, 11-3
Winner	2009	(France) Grégory Gaultier	11-9, 9-11, 11-3, 5-2 (rtd)

=== Qatar Classic: 3 final (1 title, 2 runner-up) ===
Outcome	Year	Opponent in the final	Score in the final
Winner	2007	(France) Grégory Gaultier	11-4, 8-11, 11-6, 11-5
Runner-up	2008	(Egypt) Karim Darwish	11-4, 11-5, 11-3
Runner-up	2010	(Egypt) Karim Darwish	8-11, 11-2, 11-7, 11-6

=== US Open: 4 finals (2 titles, 2 runner-up) ===
Outcome	Year	Opponent in the final	Score in the final
Runner-up	2006	(France) Grégory Gaultier	11-5, 7-11, 11-4, 11-9
Winner	2009	(Egypt) Ramy Ashour	11-7, 11-2, 7-11, 12-14, 11-8
Winner	2011	(England) Nick Matthew	11-9, 8-11, 11-2, 11-4
Runner-up	2014	(Egypt) Mohamed El Shorbagy	8-11, 11-9, 11-3, 11-3

== Career statistics ==
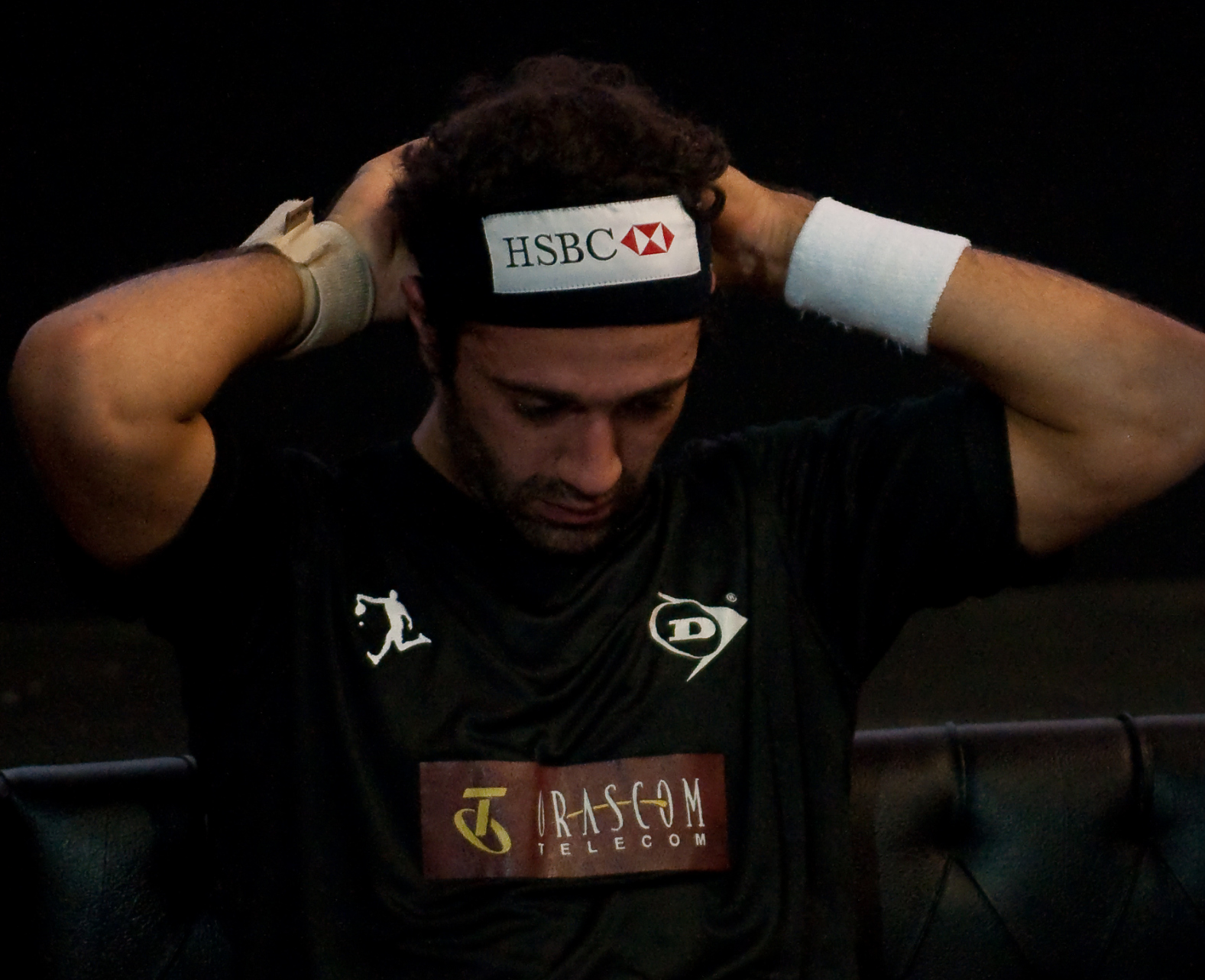
Amr Shabana during the 2009 Kuwait Open semi-final match against James Willstrop.

Listed below.

=== PSA Titles (30) ===
All Results for Amr Shabana in PSA World's Tour tournament

Legend PSA Platinum Series / PSA Series Final / PSA World Open (13) PSA Gold Series (0) PSA Silver Series (3) PSA Star Series (10) PSA Super Satellite (0) PSA Satellite (0)	Titles by major tournaments World Open (4) British Open (0) Hong Kong Open (4) US Open (2) Tournament of Champions (3) Qatar Classic (1)

No.	Date	Tournament	Opponent in final	Score in final	Minutes played
1.	July 4, 1999	Puebla Open	(Australia) Craig Rowland	11–15, 15–7, 15–7, 15–9	Unknown
2.	July 11, 1999	Mexico Open	(Australia) Craig Rowland	8–15, 15–7, 15–4, 15–13	Unknown
3.	January 23, 2001	El Ahly Open	(Egypt) Karim Darwish	15–12, 15–12, 17–15	57minutes
4.	June 29, 2003	Spanish Open	(Egypt) Karim Darwish	15–13, 13–15, 15–14, 8–15, 15–13	1 h 24 min
5.	December 21, 2003	World Open	(France) Thierry Lincou	15–11, 11–15, 15–8, 15–14	1 h 13 min
6.	September 12, 2005	Helioplis Open	(Egypt) Karim Darwish	11–10(2–0), 2–0 (ret)	Unknown
7.	September 20, 2003	St. Louis Open	(Australia) Anthony Ricketts	11–10(2–0), 11–8, 11–7	56 min
8.	October 2, 2005	Hungarian Open	(France) Grégory Gaultier	6–11, 11–2, 11–7, 8–11, 11–5	1 h 6 min
9.	December 4, 2005	World Open	(Australia) David Palmer	11–6, 11–7, 11–8	40 min
10.	January 14, 2006	Canadian Classic	(Canada) Jonathon Power	11–9, 11–8, 11–5	37 min
11.	March 3, 2006	Tournament of Champions	(England) Nick Matthew	11–6, 11–9, 11–4	40 min
12.	April 8, 2006	Bermuda Masters	(England) Peter Nicol	9–11, 11–6, 11–7, 2–11, 11–8	1 h 5 min
13.	October 22, 2006	Hong Kong Open	(Egypt) Ramy Ashour	11–10(3–1), 3–11, 11–5, 11–10(3–1)	48 min
14.	December 20, 2006	Saudi International Open	(France) Grégory Gaultier	11–7, 11–9, 11–4	1 h 13 min
15.	January 23, 2007	Windy City Open	(Australia) Anthony Ricketts	11–8, 11–8, 11–10(5–3)	53 min
16.	March 2, 2007	Tournament of Champions	(Australia) Anthony Ricketts	7–11, 11–3, 8–4 (ret)	26 min
17.	October 28, 2007	Saudi International Open	(Egypt) Ramy Ashour	11–5, 11–5, 1–11, 11–9	50 min
18.	November 3, 2007	Qatar Classic	(France) Grégory Gaultier	11–4, 8–11, 11–6, 11–5	52 min
19.	November 11, 2007	Hong Kong Open	(France) Grégory Gaultier	10–11 (1–3), 11–3, 11–6, 11–10 (3–1)	1 h 1 min
20.	December 1, 2007	World Open	(France) Grégory Gaultier	11–7, 11–4, 11–6	42 min
21.	April 27, 2008	Sheikha Al Saad Kuwait Open	(Egypt) Ramy Ashour	11–9, 11–7, 13–11	52 min
22.	November 23, 2008	Hong Kong Open	(France) Grégory Gaultier	11–7, 13–15, 8–11, 11–2, 11–3	1 h 16 min
23.	August 1, 2009	Malaysian Open	(England) Nick Matthew	5–11, 11–9, 11–6, 11–4	51 min
24.	September 6, 2009	US Open	(Egypt) Ramy Ashour	11–7, 11–2, 7–11, 12–14, 11–8	57 min
25.	October 18, 2009	Hong Kong Open	(France) Grégory Gaultier	11–8, 9–11, 11–3, 5–2 (ret)	48 min
26.	November 7, 2009	World Open	(Egypt) Ramy Ashour	11–8, 11–8, 11–5	50 min
27.	October 7, 2011	US Open	(England) Nick Matthew	11-9, 8-11, 11-2, 11-4	51 min
28.	January 8, 2012	World Series Finals	(France) Grégory Gaultier	6-11, 12-10, 11-7, 7-11, 11-8	1 h 31 min
29.	January 6, 2013	World Series Finals	(England) Nick Matthew	4-11, 11-2, 11-4, 11-7	57 min
30.	January 24, 2014	Tournament of Champions	(France) Grégory Gaultier	11-8, 11-3, 11-4	42 min

Note: (ret) = retired, min = minutes, h = hours

=== PSA Tour Finals (runner-up) (11) ===
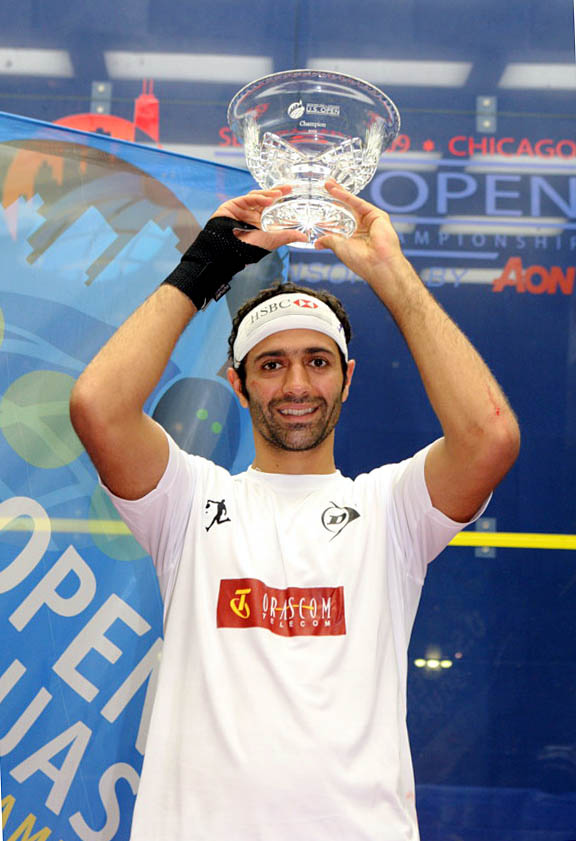
Shabana after winning the AON US Open.

No.	Date	Tournament	Opponent in final	Score in final	Minutes played
1.	May 17, 1998	Italia Open	(Scotland) John White	Unknown	Unknown
2.	May 3, 2003	Pakistan Circuit	(Egypt) Karim Darwish	12–15, 7–15, 2–6 (ret)	22 min
3.	November 6, 2004	British Open	(Australia) David Palmer	11–10(6–4), 7–11, 10–11(1–3), 7–11	1 h 29 min
4.	January 25, 2005	Windy City Open	(Scotland) John White	7–11, 8–11, 4–11	40 min
5.	January 30, 2005	Dayton Open	(England) Peter Nicol	6–11, 10–11(1–3), 2–11	28 min
6.	November 16, 2006	US Open	(France) Grégory Gaultier	5–11, 11–7, 4–11, 9–11	1 h 1 min
7.	April 11, 2007	Sheikha Al Saad Kuwait Open	(Egypt) Ramy Ashour	3–11, 5–11, 10–12	34 min
8.	February 16, 2008	Canadian Classic	(Egypt) Ramy Ashour	2–11, 9–11, 11–8, 8–11	38 min
9.	April 20, 2008	Hurghada International	(Egypt) Ramy Ashour	10–11(0–2), 11–9, 7–11, 11–9, 10–11(0–2)	1 h 17 min
10.	October 31, 2008	Qatar Classic	(Egypt) Karim Darwish	4–11, 5–11, 3–11	29 min
11.	October 18, 2014	US Open	(Egypt) Mohamed El Shorbagy	11–8, 9–11, 3–11, 3–11	45 min

=== Singles performance timeline ===
Terms
W–L	Win–loss	NWS	Not a World Series event
NG50	Not an international event	NH	Not held
A	Absent	LQ/#Q	Lost in qualifying draw and round number
RR	Lost at round robin stage	#R	Lost in the early rounds
QF	Quarterfinalist	SF	Semifinalist
SF-B	Semifinalist, won bronze medal	F	Runner-up
F	Runner-up, won silver medal	W	Winner

To prevent confusion and double counting, information in this table is updated only once a tournament or the player's participation in the tournament has concluded.

Tournament	1999	2000	2001	2002	2003	2004	2005	2006	2007	2008	2009	2010	2011	2012	2013	2014	2015	Career SR	Career W-L
PSA World Tour Tournaments
World Open	3R	Not Held		3R	W	QF	W	SF	W	SF	W	SF	QF	QF	QF	QF	A	4 / 14	55–10
British Open	A	1R	Absent		1R	F	A	1R	SF	QF	SF	Not Held		QF	A	QF	A	0 / 9	16–9
Hong Kong Open	1R	1R	1R	2R	NH	QF	NH	W	W	W	W	QF	QF	QF	QF	A	A	4 / 13	31–9
Qatar Classic	Not Held		A	2R	1R	NH	2R	2R	W	W	A	F	1R	NH	QF	NH	A	2 / 9	20–7
PSA Masters	NH	1R	1R	QF	1R	QF	Absent		Not Held		SF	SF	A	Not Held				0 / 7	10–7
Tournament of Champions	Absent		2R	1R	1R	A	SF	W	W	A	2R	QF	SF	QF	A	W	SF	3 / 12	30–9
North American Open	Not Held					Not World Series		Absent			QF	SF	SF	QF	QF	Not Held		0 / 5	13–5
Kuwait PSA Cup	Not Held					1R	A	NH	F	W	NH	F	2R	NH	QF	Not Held		1 / 5	16–5
US Open	Absent		NH	A	1R	1R	A	F	QF	NH	W	A	W	QF	A	F	A	2 / 8	22–6
Saudi International	Not Held						2R	W	W	QF	1R	Not Held						2 / 5	13–3
Pakistan International	2R	Not Held		QF	NH	QF	QF	QF	NH	NWS	Not Held					NWS	NH	0 / 5	9–5
Win Ratio	0 / 3	0 / 3	0 / 3	0 / 6	1 / 6	0 / 7	1 / 8	3 / 8	5 / 8	3 / 6	3 / 8	0 / 7	1 / 7	0 / 6	0 / 5	1 / 4	0 / 1	18 / 93	NA
Win–loss	3 / 3	0 / 3	1 / 3	8 / 6	6 / 5	13 / 7	13 / 4	26 / 5	35 / 3	23 / 3	25 / 5	22 / 7	16 / 6	13 / 6	13 / 5	14 / 3	3 / 1	NA	233–78

Note: NA = Not Available

== See also ==
- Official Men's Squash World Ranking

Sporting positions
Preceded by Jonathon Power	World No. 1 April 2006 - December 2008	Succeeded by Karim Darwish
Awards and achievements
Preceded by Thierry Lincou	PSA Player of the Year; 2005-06	Succeeded by James Willstrop
