= Anthony Ricketts =

Australian squash player (born 1979)

Personal information
- Nickname: The Machine
- Born: 12 March 1979 (age 47) Sydney, Australia
- Height: 1.85 m (6 ft 1 in)

Sport
- Country: Australia
- Turned pro: 1996
- Coached by: Rodney Martin, Malcolm Willstrop
- Retired: 2008
- Racquet used: Wilson

Men's singles
- Highest ranking: 3 (November 2005)
- World Open: QF (2003, 2004, 2005, 2006)
Medal record
Men's squash
Representing Australia
World Team Championships
Gold medal – first place	2003 Vienna	Team
World Doubles Championships
Gold medal – first place	2006 Melbourne	Doubles
Commonwealth Games
Silver medal – second place	2002 Manchester	Doubles
Silver medal – second place	2006 Melbourne	Doubles

Anthony Ricketts (born 12 March 1979 in Sydney, New South Wales) is an Australian former professional squash player.

Ricketts won the British Open in 2005, beating James Willstrop in the final 11–7, 11–9, 11–7. He also won the 2005 Tournament of Champions title, and the Super Series Finals in 2006.

At the 2002 Commonwealth Games, Ricketts won a silver medal in the men's doubles, partnering Stewart Boswell. Ricketts and Boswell again won a men's doubles silver medal at the 2006 Commonwealth Games. The pair won the men's doubles title at the 2006 World Doubles Squash Championships.

Ricketts was a member of the Australian team which won the World Team Squash Championships in 2003.

Following a knee injury, Ricketts announced his retirement from squash in December 2007.

== Biography ==
After a hugely successful 2002 – in which he leapt from 18 to 7 in the Dunlop PSA World Rankings over the year – Anthony Ricketts consolidated his success the following year by rising to World No. 6 in October 2003.

But a knee injury following his appearance in the Apawamis Open in January 2004 caused the Australian to return to Sydney from his UK base in Reading for treatment. He returned to the PSA Tour seven months later at the English Open in Sheffield – and just over a year later clinched the British Open title for the first time and rose to a career-high world No. 3.

Ricketts first came to international notice in the 2000 Hong Kong Open when he came through the qualifiers to reach his first Super Series event semi-finals. Later in the month, he beat top seed Paul Price in the final of the Australian Open to claim his domestic Open title for the first time.

It was in February 2005 in New York, where seeded ten in the Tournament of Champions, he beat third seed Peter Nicol, then Amr Shabana in the semi-finals, before defeating world champion and World No 1 Thierry Lincou in the final. "This is a big moment for me, I've been waiting for this for a long time," said the Ricketts after beating the Frenchman 11–10 7–11 11–9 6–11 11–7 in 89 minutes to take what was then the biggest title of his career.

But better was yet to come. In the 2005 British Open in Manchester, the sixth-seeded Ricketts beat Peter Nicol in the semi-finals, then another Englishman James Willstrop in straight games in the final to add his name to those already on this prestigious trophy.

The success took Ricketts to No. 3 in the world rankings – making him the top-ranked Australian for the first time – and he maintained his momentum through to November's Qatar Classic where he reached the semi-finals as seventh seed. In December, Ricketts beat both Peter Nicol and top seed Thierry Lincou en route to the final of the maiden Saudi International to celebrate his fourth PSA final appearance of the year.

The UK-based Aussie's success continued into 2006, when he reached the final of the Canary Wharf Classic in London in February, then gained the silver medal (with Stewart Boswell) in the Commonwealth Games doubles in Melbourne.

In his third appearance in the Super Series Finals in May, Ricketts recovered from losing the first qualifying round match against Lee Beachill to beat the Englishman in the final to win the title for the first time.

Following a knee injury, Ricketts announced his retirement from squash in December 2007.

== Major World Series final appearances ==
=== British Open: 1 final (1 title, 0 runner-up) ===
Outcome	Year	Opponent in the final	Score in the final
Winner	2005	(England) James Willstrop	11–7, 11–9, 11–7

=== Pakistan International: 1 final (0 title, 1 runner-up) ===
Outcome	Year	Opponent in the final	Score in the final
Runner-up	2004	(England) James Willstrop	6–11, 11–9, 13–11, 11–3
