= Thierry Lincou =

French squash player (born 1976)

Personal information
- Nickname: "Titi"
- Born: 2 April 1976 (age 50) Réunion Island
- Years active: 1994-2012
- Height: 1.80 m (5 ft 11 in)
- Weight: 78 kg (172 lb)
- Website: www.thierry-lincou.com

Sport
- Country: France
- Handedness: Right handed
- Turned pro: 1994
- Coached by: Paul Sciberras; Franck Carlino
- Retired: 2012
- Racquet used: Tecnifibre

Men's singles
- Highest ranking: No. 1 (January, 2004)
- Title: 23
- Tour final: 44
- World Open: W (2004)
Medal record
Men's squash
Representing France
World Games
Silver medal – second place	2005 Duisburg	Singles
World Championships
Gold medal – first place	2004 Doha	Singles
Silver medal – second place	2003 Lahore	Singles
Bronze medal – third place	2006 Doha	Singles
World Team Championships
Silver medal – second place	2003 Vienna	Team
Silver medal – second place	2009 Odense	Team
Bronze medal – third place	2005 Islamabad	Team
Bronze medal – third place	2007 Chennai	Team
Bronze medal – third place	2013 Mulhouse	Team
- Updated on 2 July 2012

Thierry Lincou (born 2 April 1976, in La Réunion) is a retired professional squash player from France. He reached the World No. 1 ranking in January 2004. That year, Lincou won the World Open title, the Hong Kong Open and the Super Series Finals. He has been known as one of the greatest lateral movers in the game, as well as being one of the fittest players in the history of squash. His nickname, "titi", was coined by a former competitor, Amr Shabana. He called Thierry "titi-tight," because of his precision and tight shots.

== Career overview ==
Lincou has enjoyed considerable success at the elite level of the game, rising steadily through the ranks since joining the professional squash circuit in 1994. He has beaten all of the world's top squash players including Peter Nicol, Jonathon Power, David Palmer, Lee Beachill, and many others. Lincou has been one of the most consistent players on the circuit – reaching the semi-finals of nine successive PSA events in 2003, and holding the World No. 1 ranking throughout 2005.

In 2003, Lincou was a member of the French team which finished runners-up to Australia at the World Team Squash Championships.

In 2004, he reached the PSA World Ranking Number 1 and became the first Frenchman to top the world rankings. In December, he won the 2004 World Open Squash Championship in Doha in Qatar against Lee Beachill 5–11, 11–2, 2–11, 12–10, 11–8. He became the first Frenchman to win the World Championship. In the same year, he won the Hong Kong Open against Nick Matthew in the final.

In 2006, he won 4 PSA World Tour titles including the Canary Wharf Squash Classic in London and the prestigious Pakistan Open in Islamabad.

He was runner-up of the prestigious British Open in 2006 against Nick Matthew and in 2007 against Grégory Gaultier.

He won 11 titles of the French Nationals and was one of only five players to have maintained themselves in the top 10 without interruption for 10 years at the PSA World Tour.

In October 2012, Thierry retired at the age of 36 after winning the Bluenose Squash Classic, the 23rd PSA World Tour title of his career.

He is currently coaching the Massachusetts Institute of Technology varsity squash team.

== World Open final appearances ==
=== 1 title & 1 runner-up ===
Outcome	Year	Location	Opponent in the final	Score in the final
Runner-up	2003	Lahore, Pakistan	(Egypt) Amr Shabana	15–11, 11–15, 15–8, 15–14
Winner	2004	Doha, Qatar	(England) Lee Beachill	5–11, 11–2, 2–11, 12–10, 11–8

== Major World Series final appearances ==
=== British Open: 2 finals (0 titles, 2 runner-up) ===
Outcome	Year	Opponent in the final	Score in the final
Runner-up	2006	(England) Nick Matthew	11–8, 5–11, 11–4, 9–11, 11–6
Runner-up	2007	(France) Grégory Gaultier	11–4, 10–12, 11–6, 11–3

=== Hong Kong Open: 2 finals (1 title, 1 runner-up) ===
Outcome	Year	Opponent in the final	Score in the final
Runner-up	2001	(Australia) David Palmer	15-13, 15-6, 15-9
Winner	2004	(England) Nick Matthew	11-8, 11-4, 13-11

=== Pakistan International: 2 finals (2 titles, 0 runner-up) ===
Outcome	Year	Opponent in the final	Score in the final
Winner	2005	(Australia) David Palmer	11-9, 8-11, 11-1, 4-11, 11-7
Winner	2006	(France) Grégory Gaultier	11-8, 6-11, 11-5, 11-5

== Career statistics ==
=== Singles performance timeline (since 1999) ===
Terms
W–L	Win–loss	NWS	Not a World Series event
NG50	Not an international event	NH	Not held
A	Absent	LQ/#Q	Lost in qualifying draw and round number
RR	Lost at round robin stage	#R	Lost in the early rounds
QF	Quarterfinalist	SF	Semifinalist
SF-B	Semifinalist, won bronze medal	F	Runner-up
F	Runner-up, won silver medal	W	Winner

To prevent confusion and double counting, information in this table is updated only once a tournament or the player's participation in the tournament has concluded.

Tournament	1999	2000	2001	2002	2003	2004	2005	2006	2007	2008	2009	2010	2011	2012	Career SR	Career W-L
PSA World Tour Tournaments
World Open	2R	Not Held		QF	F	W	QF	SF	QF	2R	QF	QF	3R	A	1 / 11	30–10
British Open	2R	2R	A	SF	A	SF	A	F	F	SF	2R	Not Held		A	0 / 8	19–8
Hong Kong Open	1R	1R	F	QF	NH	W	NH	2R	SF	SF	QF	QF	1R	A	1 / 11	21–10
Qatar Classic	Not Held		QF	QF	SF	NH	SF	A	QF	SF	QF	QF	2R	A	0 / 9	20–9
PSA Masters	NH	QF	2R	QF	F	SF	QF	SF	Not Held		QF	QF	A	NH	0 / 9	21–9
Tournament of Champions	NA	1R	1R	2R	F	QF	F	QF	QF	Absent		QF	A	1R	0 / 10	17-10
North American Open	Not Held					Not World Series		Absent		QF	QF	QF	A	2R	0 / 4	7–4
Kuwait PSA Cup	Not Held					1R	A	NH	A	SF	NH	QF	3R	NH	0 / 4	6–4
US Open	A	1R	NH	SF	SF	1R	A	QF	QF	NH	A	QF	SF	A	0 / 8	13–8
Saudi International	Not Held						SF	QF	QF	QF	QF	Not Held			0 / 5	11–5
Pakistan International	SF	Not Held		2R	NH	A	W	W	NH	NWS	Not Held				2 / 4	14–2
Win Ratio	0 / 4	0 / 5	0 / 4	0 / 8	0 / 5	2 / 7	1 / 6	1 / 8	0 / 7	0 / 7	0 / 7	0 / 8	0 / 5	0 / 2	4 / 81 (4,9 %)	NA
Win–loss	5 / 4	3 / 5	7 / 4	16 / 8	18 / 5	17 / 5	19 / 5	21 / 7	17 / 7	17 / 7	16 / 7	15 / 8	7 / 5	1 / 2	NA	179 / 79 (69,4 %)

Note: NA = Not Available

== See also ==
- Official Men's Squash World Ranking

Sporting positions
Preceded by Peter Nicol; Lee Beachill	World No. 1 January 2004 – February 2004; January 2005 – December 2005	Succeeded by John White; Jonathon Power
Awards and achievements
Preceded by —	PSA Player of the Year; 2005	Succeeded by Amr Shabana
