= Saudi International (squash) =

Details
- Event name: Saudi International Squash Tournament
- Location: Al Khobar, Saudi Arabia
- Website www.atcosquash.com

Men's Winner
- Category: World Series Platinum
- Prize money: $250,000
- Most recent champion(s): (Egypt) Ramy Ashour

The Saudi International is an annual men's squash tournament held in Al Khobar, in Saudi Arabia in December. It was part of the PSA World Series, the highest level of men's professional squash competition. The tournament was sponsored by ATCO, the company of President Ziad Al-Turki also chairman of the PSA. The event was founded in 2005 and was last held in 2009.

== Past Results ==
Year	Champion	Runner-up	Score in final
2010	not held due to the 2010 World Open		
2009	(Egypt) Ramy Ashour	(England) Nick Matthew	11-7, 7-11, 11-9, 9-11, 11-8
2008	(Egypt) Karim Darwish	(France) Grégory Gaultier	11-9, 11-5, 3-11, 11-8
2007	(Egypt) Amr Shabana	(Egypt) Ramy Ashour	11-5, 11-5, 1-11, 11-9
2006	(Egypt) Amr Shabana	(France) Grégory Gaultier	11-7, 11-9, 11-4
2005	(Canada) Jonathon Power	(Australia) Anthony Ricketts	11-4, 11-9, 4-11, 11-5
