= Rasmus Nielsen (squash player) =

Danish squash player (born 1983)

Personal information
- Born: 28 February 1983 (age 43) Sønderborg, Denmark
- Height: 1.85 m (6 ft 1 in)
- Weight: 84 kg (185 lb)

Sport
- Country: Denmark
- Turned pro: 2007
- Coached by: Francesco Busi
- Retired: retired
- Racquet used: Prince

Men's singles
- Highest ranking: No. 75 (March 2013)
- Updated on July 2018

Rasmus Nielsen (born 28 February 1983) is a professional squash player who has represented Denmark.

Nielsen was born in Sønderborg. He reached a career-high world ranking of World No. 75 in March 2013.
