= Wael El Hindi =

Egyptian squash player

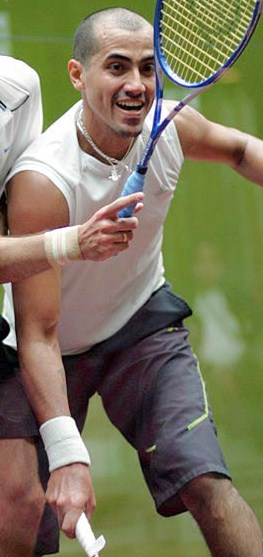

Personal information
- Full name: Wael Hatem El Hindi
- Born: June 25, 1980 (age 46) Giza, Egypt
- Height: 1.87 m (6 ft 2 in)
- Weight: 77 kg (170 lb)

Sport
- Country: Egypt
- Handedness: Right Handed
- Turned pro: 1999
- Coached by: Jonah Barrington
- Retired: 2012
- Racquet used: Tecnifibre

Men's singles
- Highest ranking: No. 8 (November 2008)
- Title: 8
- Tour final: 13
- World Open: QF (2006, 2009)
Medal record
Men's squash
Representing Egypt
World Team Championships
Gold medal – first place	2009 Odense	Team
Silver medal – second place	2005 Islamabad	Team
- Updated on June 2013

Wael Hatem El-Hendy (Arabic: وَائِل حَاتِم الْهِنْدِيّ; born June 25, 1980, in Giza) is a professional squash player who represented Egypt. A Professional Squash Association (PSA) member since 1999, Wael El Hindi has long been regarded as one of Egypt's most talented players – first making his mark in the US in 1998 when he reached the final of the World Junior Championship as a 5/8 seed. Steady progress on the Tour saw the 28-year-old from Giza – who currently divides his time between Egypt and England – reaching a career high ranking of World No. 8 in November 2008.

== Professional career ==
El Hindi reached his first Tour final in Spain at the Trofeo Aquarius Open in October 1999, but it was a further two years later, in the same country, that he claimed his maiden title at the Spanish Open in Tenerife, in September 2001. Early the following year, he won his first trophy on home soil at the El Ahly Open in Cairo.

In 2004, El Hindi began a love affair with Malaysia where he won the Kuala Lumpur Open in February – then went on to reach the final of the Malaysian Open later in the year, and again in 2005, in both cases exceeding his seeding. His standout achievements in 2006 included home country success in the Heliopolis Open in August 2006 – when he made his breakthrough after beating Finland's second seed Olli Tuominen in the quarter-finals. The following month, unseeded, he joined the last eight of the World Open, also in Egypt, after beating seeded compatriot Karim Darwish and England's Nick Matthew.

El Hindi began 2007 by again beating higher-seeded Darwish en route to a semi-final berth in the Canadian Classic in January. In April, he produced impressive performances in both the Kuwait Open and Qatar Classic (in Doha, featuring upsets over Anthony Ricketts and Lee Beachill) which saw him leap four places to make his top ten debut in May. In July, he successfully defended his Heliopolis Open crown after overcoming fellow Egyptians in each round – Mohd Ali Anwar Reda, Omar Elborolossy, Mohammed Abbas, and then Karim Darwish in the final.

El Hindi's 2008 campaign began with a quarter-final berth in the Tournament of Champions in January, then the following month he exceeded his seeding in the Canadian Classic in Toronto, where he beat Australian Cameron Pilley to set up a surprise all-Egyptian semi-final line-up. In May, Wael made his debut in the Super Series Finals in London, where he beat Ong Beng Hee en route to recording a sixth-place finish. El Hindi has credited his success to working on his fitness with British squash legend Jonah Barrington in England. He reached a career-high world ranking of World No. 8 in November 2008.

As of 2021, El Hindi owns and operates the Kinetic Indoor Racquet Club in Boynton Beach, Florida, and he currently coaches squash for Saint Andrew's School, based nearby in Boca Raton.

== Major World Series final appearances ==
=== US Open: 1 final (1 title, 0 runner-up) ===
Outcome	Year	Opponent in the final	Score in the final
Winner	2010	(Netherlands) Laurens Jan Anjema	11–8, 5–11, 11–7, 11–7

== See also ==
- Official Men's Squash World Ranking
