= Yann Perrin =

French squash player (born 1985)

Personal information
- Born: 1 August 1985 (age 40) Épinal, France
- Height: 1.89 m (6 ft 2 in)
- Weight: 72 kg (159 lb)

Sport
- Country: France
- Turned pro: 2005
- Coached by: Andre Delhoste
- Retired: 2014
- Racquet used: Head

Men's singles
- Highest ranking: No. 54 (June 2010)
- Title: 1
- Tour final: 4
- Updated on August 2017

Yann Perrin (born 1 August 1985 in Épinal) is a professional squash player who represented France. He reached a career-high world ranking of World No. 54 in June 2010.
