= Amr Swelim =

Italian squash player (born 1984)

Personal information
- Born: 7 June 1984 (age 42) Cairo, Egypt
- Height: 1.72 m (5 ft 8 in)
- Weight: 73 kg (161 lb)

Sport
- Country: Italy
- Turned pro: 2002
- Coached by: Hisham El Attar
- Retired: 2012
- Racquet used: Dunlop

Men's singles
- Highest ranking: No. 39 (December 2009)
- Updated on June 2018

Amr Swelim (born 7 June 1984) is a professional squash player who represents Italy. He reached a career-high world ranking of World No. 39 in December 2009.
