= Scott Arnold (squash player) =

Australian squash player (born 1986)

Personal information
- Born: 8 February 1986 (age 40) Sydney, Australia
- Height: 1.93 m (6 ft 4 in)
- Weight: 90 kg (200 lb)

Sport
- Country: Australia
- Handedness: Right Handed
- Turned pro: 2004
- Coached by: Rod Martin
- Retired: Active
- Racquet used: Harrow

Men's singles
- Highest ranking: No. 54 (singles); No. 1 (doubles)
- Current ranking: N/A
- Titles: 3 singles, 10 doubles
- Tour final: 10 singles
Medal record
Men's squash
Representing Australia
World Team Championships
Silver medal – second place	2007 Chennai	Team
- Updated on January 2014

Scott Arnold (born 8 February 1986 in Sydney) is a professional squash player who represented Australia. He reached a career-high singles world ranking of World No. 54 in January 2008, and is currently the number 1 ranked doubles player in the world.
