= Adrian Grant (squash player) =

English squash player (born 1980)

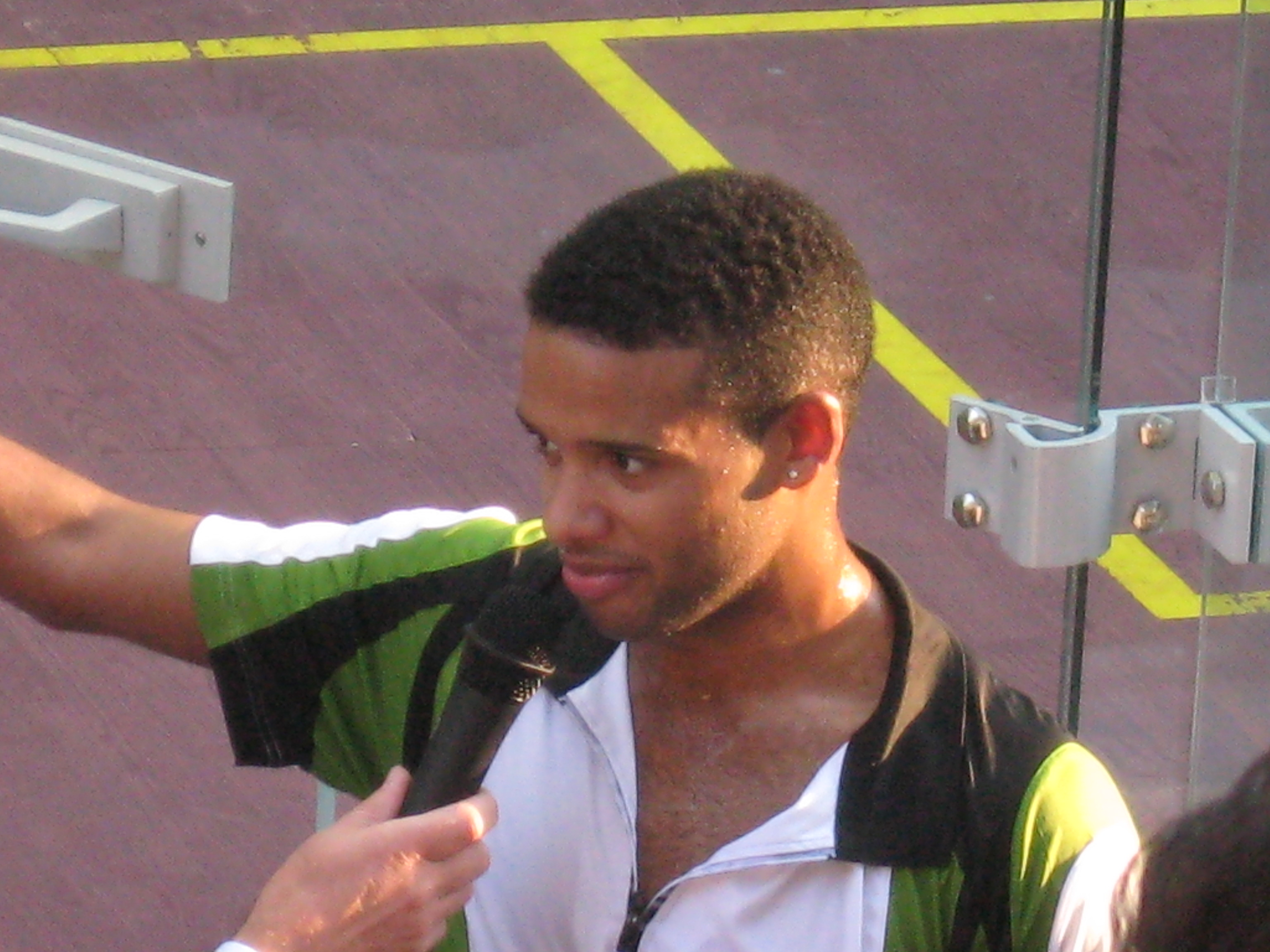
- Adrian Grant

Personal information
- Nationality: British (English)
- Born: 6 October 1980 (age 45) London, England
- Height: 5 ft 11 in (180 cm)
- Weight: 75 kg (165 lb)

Sport
- Handedness: Left Handed
- Turned pro: 1999
- Coached by: David Campion; David Pearson
- Retired: Retired(2016)
- Racquet used: Harrow Spark

Men's singles
- Highest ranking: No. 9 (August 2009)
- Title: 18
- Tour final: 28
- World Open: QF (2008)
Medal record
Men's squash
Representing England
World Team Championships
Gold medal – first place	2013 Mulhouse	Team
Commonwealth Games
Gold medal – first place	2010 Delhi	Men's doubles
Silver medal – second place	2014 Glasgow	Men's doubles
European Team Championships
Gold medal – first place	2004 Rennes	Team
Gold medal – first place	2007 Riccione	Team
Gold medal – first place	2008 Amsterdam	Team
Gold medal – first place	2009 Malmö	Team
Bronze medal – third place	2010 Aix-en-Provence	Team
Gold medal – first place	2013 Amsterdam	Team
Gold medal – first place	2014 Riccione	Team

Adrian Grant (born 6 October 1980) is a professional squash player from England. He reached a career-high world ranking of World No. 9 in August 2009.

== Biography ==
Grant represented the 2006 England team at the 2006 Commonwealth Games in Melbourne, Australia, where he competed in the mixed doubles partnering Alison Waters.

Grant finished as the runner-up at the British National Squash Championships in 2009 (losing in the final to Nick Matthew).

Grant represented the 2010 England team at the 2010 Commonwealth Games in Delhi, India, where he competed in the men's doubles and won a gold medal, partnering Nick Matthew. He went to another Commonwealth Games after being selected for the 2014 England team at the 2014 Commonwealth Games in Glasgow, Scotland, where he competed in the squash events and won a silver medal, partnering Nick Matthew again.

Grant won six gold medals for the England men's national squash team at the European Squash Team Championships from 2004 to 2014.
