= Karim Darwish (squash player) =

Egyptian squash player (born 1981)

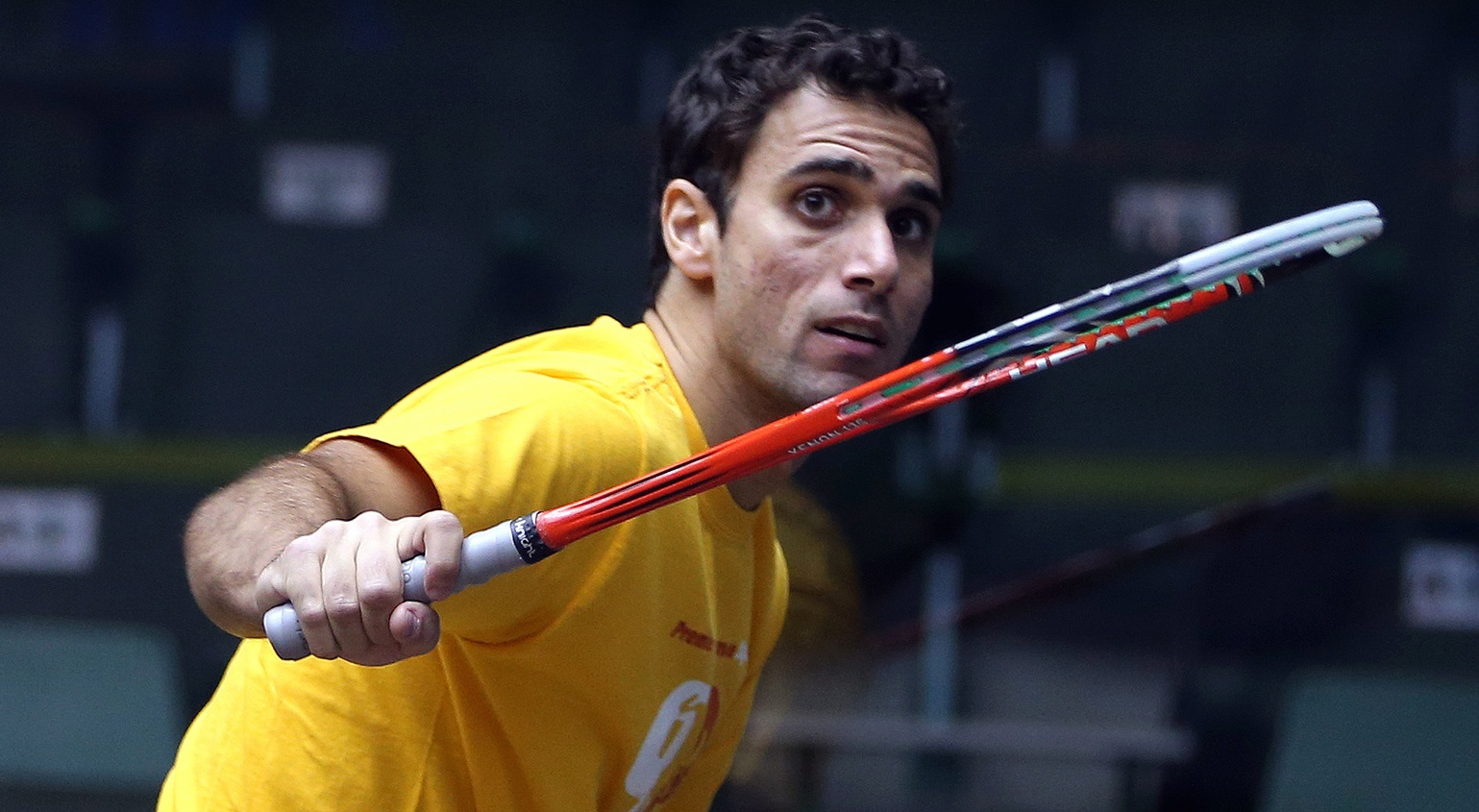

Personal information
- Nickname: The Dark Prince
- Born: 29 August 1981 (age 45) Cairo, Egypt
- Height: 1.79 m (5 ft 10 in)
- Weight: 76 kg (168 lb)

Sport
- Country: Egypt
- Handedness: Right Handed
- Turned pro: 1999
- Coached by: Hesham El Attar; Amir Wagih
- Retired: 2014
- Racquet used: Head

Men's singles
- Highest ranking: No. 1 (January, 2009)
- Title: 23
- Tour final: 41
- World Open: F (2008)
Medal record
Men's squash
Representing Egypt
World Championships
Silver medal – second place	2008 Manchester	Singles
Bronze medal – third place	2003 Lahore	Singles
Bronze medal – third place	2011 Rotterdam	Singles
World Team Championships
Gold medal – first place	2009 Odense	Team
Gold medal – first place	2011 Paderborn	Team
Silver medal – second place	2001 Melbourne	Team
Silver medal – second place	2005 Islamabad	Team
Silver medal – second place	2013 Mulhouse	Team
- Updated on June 2014

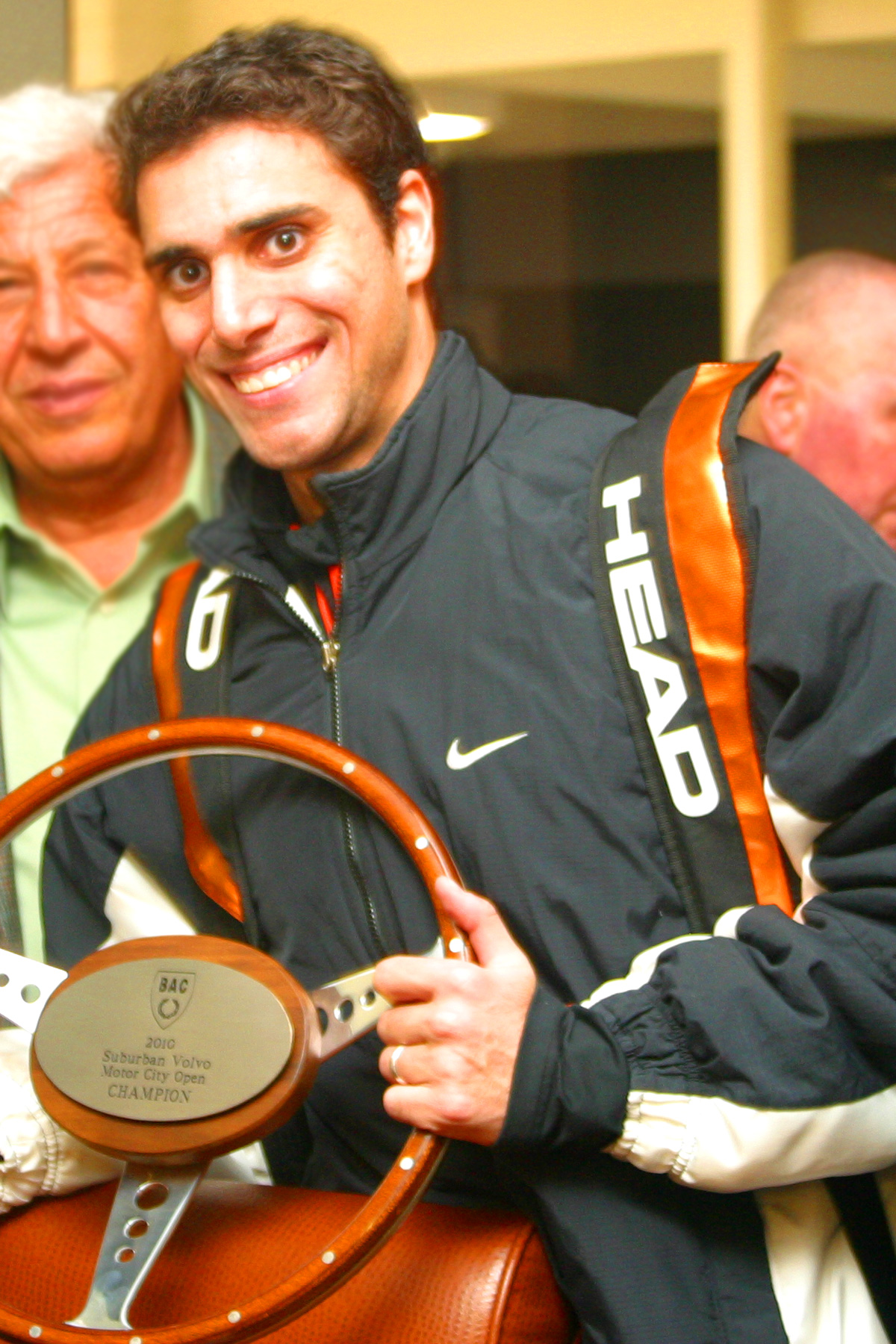
Darwish after winning the 2009 Motor City Open

Karim Darwish (Arabic: كَرِيم دَرْوِيش; born 29 August 1981) is an Egyptian squash player.

== Career overview ==
As a junior player, he won the World Junior Championship title in 2000, and the British Junior Open title in 1999.

Earlier in 2008, Darwish finished runner-up at the World Open, losing in the final to fellow Egyptian player Ramy Ashour (11–5, 8–11, 4–11, 5–11). Darwish displaced Amr Shabana to claim the world number 1 position after winning the prestigious 2008 Saudi International and 3 major titles (including the Qatar Classic) in 2008.

Darwish competed in the J.P. Morgan T.O.C, losing to Daryl Selby in round 1. In the Case Swedish Open in 2012, Darwish placed 2nd after losing to Grégory Gaultier in the final. Darwish managed to beat Mohamed El Shorbagy in five games at the Macau Open 2012.

== Personal life ==
Darwish is married to fellow squash player and former women's World No. 11 Engy Kheirallah, with whom he has a son named Omar

== World Open final appearances ==
=== 0 title & 1 runner-up ===
Outcome	Year	Location	Opponent in the final	Score in the final
Runner-up	2008	Manchester, England	(Egypt) Ramy Ashour	5–11, 11–8, 11–4, 11–5

== Major World Series final appearances ==
=== Hong Kong Open: 1 final (0 title, 1 runner-up) ===
Outcome	Year	Opponent in the final	Score in the final
Runner-up	2011	(England) James Willstrop	11–9, 11–5, 11–4

=== Qatar Classic: 3 finals (2 titles, 1 runner-up) ===
Outcome	Year	Opponent in the final	Score in the final
Winner	2008	(Egypt) Amr Shabana	11–4, 11–5, 11–3
Runner-up	2009	(England) Nick Matthew	11–5, 12–10, 11–6
Winner	2010	(Egypt) Amr Shabana	8–11, 11–2, 11–7, 11–6

== See also ==
- Official Men's Squash World Ranking

Sporting positions
Preceded by Amr Shabana; Grégory Gaultier	World No. 1 January 2009 - October 2009; December 2009	Succeeded by Grégory Gaultier; Ramy Ashour
