= Mohammed Abbas (squash player) =

Egyptian squash player (born 1980)

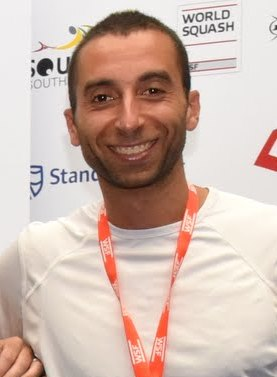
- Mohammed Abbas (2016)

Personal information
- Born: December 24, 1980 (age 45) Giza, Egypt
- Height: 1.89 m (6 ft 2 in)
- Weight: 77 kg (170 lb)

Sport
- Country: Egypt
- Turned pro: 1998
- Retired: 2012
- Racquet used: Harrow

Men's singles
- Highest ranking: No. 13 (April, 2007)
- Updated on September, 2012

Mohammed Abbas (born December 24, 1980, in Giza) is a former professional squash player who represented Egypt. He reached a career-high international ranking of World No. 13 in April 2007.

In 2016, Abbas became the first Egyptian title holder of World Masters Squash Championships, after winning in the 35+ division.
