= Olli Tuominen =

Finnish squash player (born 1979)

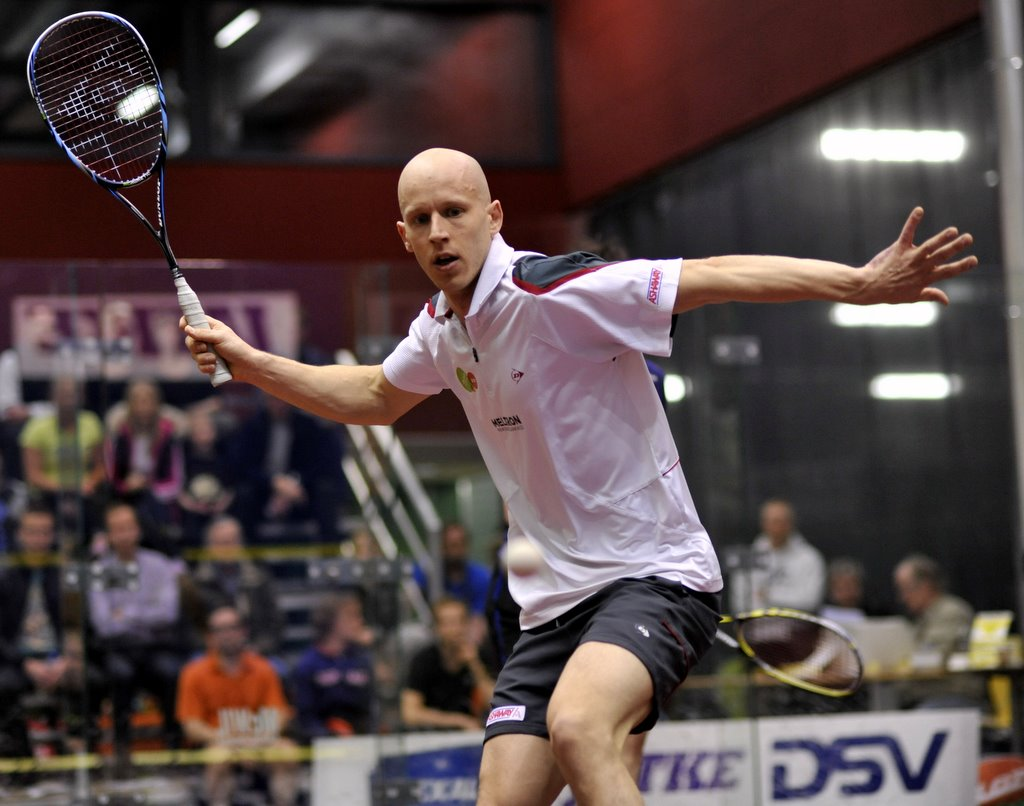

Personal information
- Born: 15 April 1979 (age 47) Helsinki, Finland
- Height: 1.76 m (5 ft 9 in)
- Weight: 67 kg (148 lb)
- Website: www.ollituominen.com

Sport
- Country: Finland
- Handedness: Right Handed
- Turned pro: 1997
- Coached by: Ari Pelkonen; Simo Tarvonen; Tomi Niinimaki
- Retired: Active
- Racquet used: Dunlop

Men's singles
- Highest ranking: No. 13 (February 2006)
- Current ranking: No. 53 (August 2018)
- Title: 10
- Tour final: 17
- Updated on June 2013

Olli Tuominen (born 15 April 1979 in Helsinki) is a professional squash player who represented Finland. He turned professional in 1997 and reached a career-high world ranking of World No. 13 in February 2006.
