= 2011 PSA World Tour =

PSA World Tour 2011

Details
- Event name: PSA World Tour 2011
- Tournaments: 126
- Categories: PSA World Championship; PSA World Series (9); PSA World Series Finals; PSA International (23); PSA Challenger (92)
- Website www.psaworldtour.com

Achievements
- World Number 1: (England) Nick Matthew (12 months)
- World Champion: (England) Nick Matthew

Awards
- Player of the year: (Egypt) Ramy Ashour
- Young player of the year: (Switzerland) Nicolas Müller

The PSA World Tour 2011 is the international squash tour organised circuit organized by the Professional Squash Association (PSA) for the 2011 squash season. The most important tournament in the series is the World Open held in Rotterdam in the Netherlands. The tour features three categories of regular events, World Series, which feature the highest prize money and the best fields, International and Challenger. The Tour is concluded by the PSA World Series Finals, the end of season championship for the top 8 rated players.

== 2011 Calendar ==
=== Key ===
World Open
World Series Platinum
World Series Gold
International 70
International 50

=== World Open ===
Tournament	Date	Champion	Runner-up	Semifinalists	Quarterfinalists	Round of 16	
World Open 2011 (Netherlands) Rotterdam, Netherlands; World Open $275,000 - Draw	30 October - 6 November 2011	(England) Nick Matthew; 6-11, 11-9, 11-6, 11-5	(France) Grégory Gaultier	(Egypt) Karim Darwish (England) James Willstrop	(Egypt) Ramy Ashour (Egypt) Amr Shabana (England) Peter Barker (Australia) David Palmer	(Egypt) Mohamed El Shorbagy (France) Thierry Lincou (Netherlands) Laurens Jan Anjema (Egypt) Hisham Ashour	(Australia) Cameron Pilley (Botswana) Alister Walker (Spain) Borja Golán (Egypt) Marwan El Shorbagy

=== PSA World Series ===
Prize money: $115,000 and more

Tournament	Date	Champion	Runner-up	Semifinalists	Quarterfinalists
Tournament of Champions 2011 (United States) New York City, United States; World Series Gold $115,000 - Draw	21–27 January 2011	(Egypt) Ramy Ashour; 11-3, 7-11, 11-9, 11-7	(England) Nick Matthew	(England) James Willstrop (Egypt) Amr Shabana	(England) Peter Barker (Netherlands) Laurens Jan Anjema (Egypt) Mohd El Shorbagy (Australia) David Palmer
North American Open 2011 (United States) Richmond, Virginia, United States; World Series Gold $115,000 - Draw	20–26 February 2011	(England) Nick Matthew; 11-9, 11-5, 8-11, 8-11, 11-6	(Egypt) Ramy Ashour	(England) James Willstrop (Egypt) Amr Shabana	(France) Grégory Gaultier (England) Peter Barker (Malaysia) Mohd Azlan Iskandar (Australia) David Palmer
Australian Open 2011 (Australia) Canberra, Australia; World Series Platinum $150,000 - Draw	8–14 August 2011	(Egypt) Ramy Ashour; 12-14, 11-6, 10-12, 11-8, 11-4	(England) Nick Matthew	(France) Grégory Gaultier (Australia) David Palmer	(Egypt) Karim Darwish (England) James Willstrop (England) Peter Barker (Netherlands) Laurens Jan Anjema
British Grand Prix 2011 (England) Manchester, England; World Series Gold $115,000 - Draw	19–25 September 2011	(Egypt) Ramy Ashour; 3-11, 11-3, 11-7, 11-4	(England) Nick Matthew	(Egypt) Karim Darwish (Egypt) Amr Shabana	(France) Grégory Gaultier (England) Peter Barker (Egypt) Omar Mosaad (England) Adrian Grant
US Open 2011 (United States) Philadelphia, United States; World Series Gold $115,000 - Draw	30 September - 6 October 2011	(Egypt) Amr Shabana; 11-9, 8-11, 11-2, 11-4	(England) Nick Matthew	(England) James Willstrop (France) Thierry Lincou	(England) Peter Barker (Egypt) Mohd El Shorbagy (Malaysia) Mohd Azlan Iskandar (Netherlands) Laurens Jan Anjema
Qatar Classic 2011; Doha, Qatar; World Series Platinum $150,000 - Draw	16–21 October 2011	(France) Grégory Gaultier; 11-8, 11-7, 2-11, 11-8	(England) James Willstrop	(Egypt) Karim Darwish (Australia) Stewart Boswell	(England) Peter Barker (Australia) Cameron Pilley (Switzerland) Nicolas Müller (Egypt) Tarek Momen
Hong Kong Open 2011; Hong Kong, China; World Series Platinum $150,000 - Draw	15–20 November 2011	(England) James Willstrop; 11-5, 11-9, 11-4	(Egypt) Karim Darwish	(France) Grégory Gaultier (Malaysia) Mohd Azlan Iskandar	(England) Nick Matthew (Egypt) Amr Shabana (England) Peter Barker (Australia) Stewart Boswell
Kuwait PSA Cup 2011; Kuwait City, Kuwait; World Series Platinum $165,000 - Draw	23–29 November 2011	(England) James Willstrop; 11-9, 10-12, 11-4, 11-2	(Egypt) Karim Darwish	(France) Grégory Gaultier (Egypt) Mohd El Shorbagy	(England) Nick Matthew (England) Peter Barker (Netherlands) Laurens Jan Anjema (Australia) Stewart Boswell
PSA Masters 2011 (India) New Delhi, India; World Series Platinum $150,000 - Draw	12–18 December 2011	(England) James Willstrop; 19-21, 11-8, 11-4, 6-1	(France) Grégory Gaultier	(England) Peter Barker (Egypt) Mohd El Shorbagy	(Egypt) Ramy Ashour (Egypt) Karim Darwish (England) Daryl Selby (Netherlands) Laurens Jan Anjema

Final tournament	Date	Champion	Runner-up	Semifinalists	Round Robin
PSA World Series Finals 2011 (England) Queen's Club, London, England; PSA World Series Finals $110,000 - Draw	4–8 January 2012	(Egypt) Amr Shabana; 6-11, 12-10, 11-7, 7-11, 11-8	(France) Grégory Gaultier	(England) James Willstrop (Egypt) Karim Darwish	(England) Peter Barker (Malaysia) Mohd Azlan Iskandar (Egypt) Mohd El Shorbagy (Netherlands) Laurens Jan Anjema

=== International ===
Prize money: between $25,000 and $114,999

==== January ====
Tournament	Date	Champion	Runner-up	Semifinalists	Quarterfinalists
Comfort Inn Open 2011 (Canada) Vancouver, Canada; International 35 $35,000	13–15 January 2011	(England) Daryl Selby; 11-6, 10-12, 9-11, 12-10, 11-5	(Egypt) Hisham Mohd Ashour	(Australia) David Palmer (Finland) Olli Tuominen	(Canada) Shahier Razik (Colombia) Miguel Ángel Rodríguez (Mexico) Cesar Salazar (Mexico) Jorge Isaac Baltazar Ferreira
Motor City Open 2011 (United States) Detroit, United States; International 50 $50,000	28–31 January 2011	(Egypt) Mohamed El Shorbagy; 8-11, 11-6, 11-8, 11-5	(Egypt) Omar Mosaad	(Australia) David Palmer (England) Adrian Grant	(England) Jonathan Kemp (Egypt) Tarek Momen (England) Tom Richards (Scotland) Alan Clyne

==== February ====
Tournament	Date	Champion	Runner-up	Semifinalists	Quarterfinalists
Swedish Open 2011 (Sweden) Linköping, Sweden; International 50 $60,000	3–6 February 2011	(England) Nick Matthew; 11-7, 11-6, 11-5	(England) Peter Barker	(Egypt) Karim Darwish (England) Daryl Selby	(Australia) Cameron Pilley (Australia) Stewart Boswell (Pakistan) Farhan Mehboob (Italy) Davide Bianchetti
Bluenose Classic 2011 (Canada) Halifax, Canada; International 50 $50,000	3–6 February 2011	(Malaysia) Mohd Azlan Iskandar; 11-8, 8-11, 11-9, 11-7	(Egypt) Hisham Mohd Ashour	(United States) Julian Illingworth (United States) Gilly Lane	(Netherlands) Laurens Jan Anjema (Colombia) Miguel Ángel Rodríguez (Egypt) Mohammed Abbas (Switzerland) Nicolas Müller

==== March ====
Tournament	Date	Champion	Runner-up	Semifinalists	Quarterfinalists
Kig Open 2011 (United States) Los Angeles, United States; International 25 $25,000	3–6 March 2011	(England) Jonathan Kemp; 11-7, 11-8, 7-11, 7-11, 11-6	(United States) Julian Illingworth	(Australia) Ryan Cuskelly (Belgium) Stefan Casteleyn	(Egypt) Mohd Ali Anwar Reda (Egypt) Omar Abdel Aziz (England) Chris Simpson (Egypt) Amr Khaled Khalifa
Manitoba Open 2011 (Canada) Winnipeg, Canada; International 25 $25,000	10–13 March 2011	(England) Adrian Grant; 8-11, 11-2, 11-2, 12-10	(United States) Julian Illingworth	(Canada) Shahier Razik (Australia) Ryan Cuskelly	(Mexico) Arturo Salazar (Czech Republic) Jan Koukal (Finland) Henrik Mustonen (England) Robbie Temple
Rocky Mountain Open 2011 (Canada) Calgary, Canada; International 50 $50,000	16–19 March 2011	(Australia) David Palmer; 11-7, 5-11, 4-11, 11-7, 11-6	(Netherlands) Laurens Jan Anjema	(Egypt) Omar Mosaad (Switzerland) Nicolas Müller	(Canada) Shahier Razik (Egypt) Tarek Momen (Australia) Ryan Cuskelly (Australia) Zac Alexander
Kuala Lumpur Open Squash Championships 2011 (Malaysia) Kuala Lumpur, Malaysia; International 50 $50,000	17–20 March 2011	(Egypt) Karim Darwish; 11-9, 11-9, 11-3	(Egypt) Mohamed El Shorbagy	(Malaysia) Mohd Azlan Iskandar (France) Grégoire Marche	(India) Saurav Ghosal (Pakistan) Aamir Atlas Khan (South Africa) Stephen Coppinger (Malaysia) Mohd Nafiizwan Adnan
Canary Wharf Squash Classic 2011 (England) London, England; International 50 $50,000	21–25 March 2011	(England) Nick Matthew; 5-11, 11-4, 11-1, 11-3	(England) Peter Barker	(England) James Willstrop (France) Grégory Gaultier	(England) Daryl Selby (Australia) Stewart Boswell (Germany) Simon Rösner (England) Joey Barrington
Montreal Open 2011 (Canada) Montreal, Canada; International 50 $50,000	21–25 March 2011	(Egypt) Hisham Mohd Ashour; 9-11, 11-7, 11-3, 11-6	(Australia) David Palmer	(Netherlands) Laurens Jan Anjema (Botswana) Alister Walker	(England) Adrian Grant (Italy) Stéphane Galifi (Scotland) Alan Clyne (Czech Republic) Jan Koukal
Kolkata International 2011 (India) Kolkata, India; International 50 $50,000	29–30 March 2011	(Egypt) Karim Darwish; 12-10, 12-10, 11-4	(Egypt) Omar Mosaad	(India) Saurav Ghosal (Egypt) Karim Abdel Gawad	(Malaysia) Ong Beng Hee (Egypt) Mohd Ali Anwar Reda (England) Robbie Temple (Egypt) Amr Khaled Khalifa

==== April ====
Tournament	Date	Champion	Runner-up	Semifinalists	Quarterfinalists
Berkshire Squash Open 2011 (United States) Williamstown, United States; International 25 $30,000	6–10 April 2011	(Egypt) Wael El Hindi; 11-9, 11-7, 11-9	(England) Tom Richards	(England) Jonathan Kemp (Colombia) Miguel Ángel Rodríguez	(Canada) Shahier Razik (Spain) Borja Golán (Mexico) Arturo Salazar (Malaysia) Mohd Nafiizwan Adnan
Irish Squash Open 2011 (Republic of Ireland) Dublin, Ireland; International 25 $25,000	13–16 April 2011	(Egypt) Tarek Momen; 12-10, 11-7, 8-11, 11-3	(Australia) Stewart Boswell	(India) Saurav Ghosal (Spain) Borja Golán	(Finland) Olli Tuominen (England) Chris Ryder (France) Mathieu Castagnet (India) Siddharth Suchde

==== May ====
Tournament	Date	Champion	Runner-up	Semifinalists	Quarterfinalists
Hurghada International 2011 (Egypt) Hurghada, Egypt; International 70 $77,500 - Draw	14–19 May 2011	(Egypt) Ramy Ashour; 11-9, 9-11, 12-14, 11-9, 11-3	(Egypt) Karim Darwish	(France) Grégory Gaultier (Finland) Olli Tuominen	(Egypt) Omar Mosaad (Egypt) Tarek Momen (Egypt) Mohd Ali Anwar Reda (Egypt) Mohammed Abbas

==== June ====
Tournament	Date	Champion	Runner-up	Semifinalists	Quarterfinalists
Internationaux De La Reunion 2011 (France) Saint-Pierre, Reunion Island, France; International 25 $25,000	22–25 June 2011	(Egypt) Mohamed El Shorbagy; 5-11, 11-5, 11-4, 10-12, 15-13	(France) Thierry Lincou	(Hungary) Márk Krajcsák (France) Julien Balbo	(France) Yann Perrin (Malaysia) Kamran Khan (England) Oliver Pett (Denmark) Rasmus Nielsen

==== July ====
Tournament	Date	Champion	Runner-up	Semifinalists	Quarterfinalists
Malaysian Open Squash Championships 2011 (Malaysia) Kuala Lumpur, Malaysia; International 50 $50,000 - Draw	20–23 July 2011	(France) Grégory Gaultier; 11-8, 11-3, 11-3	(Pakistan) Aamir Atlas Khan	(Australia) Cameron Pilley (Scotland) Alan Clyne	(Egypt) Mohamed El Shorbagy (Malaysia) Mohd Azlan Iskandar (Malaysia) Ong Beng Hee (Egypt) Karim Abdel Gawad
Cairo Open Squash Championships 2011 (Egypt) Cairo, Egypt; International 25 $25,000	25–28 July 2011	(Egypt) Mohd Ali Anwar Reda; 6-11, 12-10, 12-10, 6-11, 16-14	(Egypt) Marwan El Shorbagy	(Egypt) Omar Mosaad (Egypt) Omar Abdel Aziz	(Pakistan) Aamir Atlas Khan (Italy) Stéphane Galifi (Denmark) Kristian Frost Olesen (Egypt) Omar Abdel Meguid

==== September ====
Tournament	Date	Champion	Runner-up	Semifinalists	Quarterfinalists
Colombian Open 2011 (Colombia) Bogotá, Colombia; International 35 $35,000	1–4 September 2011	(Egypt) Mohamed El Shorbagy; 7-11, 11-7, 11-8, 2-11, 15-13	(Netherlands) Laurens Jan Anjema	(Botswana) Alister Walker (Colombia) Miguel Ángel Rodríguez	(New Zealand) Martin Knight (Brazil) Rafael Alarçón (Finland) Henrik Mustonen (Hong Kong) Max Lee

==== October ====
Tournament	Date	Champion	Runner-up	Semifinalists	Quarterfinalists
Netsuite Open 2011 (United States) San Francisco, United States; International 35 $35,000	7–10 October 2011	(Netherlands) Laurens Jan Anjema; 7-11, 7-11, 11-8, 11-5, 14-12	(Egypt) Omar Mosaad	(England) Daryl Selby (Botswana) Alister Walker	(Egypt) Wael El Hindi (Canada) Shahier Razik (Scotland) Alan Clyne (Mexico) Arturo Salazar
Santiago Open 2011 (Spain) Santiago de Compostela, Spain; International 25 $25,000	19–22 October 2011	(Spain) Borja Golán; 14-12, 11-0, 8-11, 11-6	(England) Adrian Grant	(France) Grégoire Marche (England) Oliver Pett	(South Africa) Stephen Coppinger (Czech Republic) Jan Koukal (New Zealand) Campbell Grayson (Spain) Carlos Cornes Ribadas

==== November ====
Tournament	Date	Champion	Runner-up	Semifinalists	Quarterfinalists
Dayton Open 2011 (United States) Dayton, United States; International 25 $25,000	10–13 November 2011	(Botswana) Alister Walker; 11-4, 14-12, 11-4	(Pakistan) Yasir Butt	(England) Adrian Grant (England) Chris Simpson	(England) Adrian Waller (New Zealand) Campbell Grayson (England) Oliver Pett (Pakistan) Danish Atlas Khan
Macau Open 2011; Macau, China; International 50 $50,000	10–13 November 2011	(Egypt) Mohamed El Shorbagy; 11-13, 11-5, 11-5, 11-7	(France) Thierry Lincou	(Egypt) Hisham Mohd Ashour (Finland) Olli Tuominen	(Malaysia) Mohd Azlan Iskandar (United States) Julian Illingworth (Malaysia) Ong Beng Hee (Spain) Borja Golán
Pittsburgh Open 2011 (United States) Pittsburgh, United States; International 25 $25,000	17–20 November 2011	(Botswana) Alister Walker; 11-7, 6-11, 11-4, 15-17, 11-2	(England) Adrian Grant	(Canada) Shahier Razik (Australia) Ryan Cuskelly	(England) Chris Simpson (Mexico) Cesar Salazar (New Zealand) Campbell Grayson (Finland) Henrik Mustonen

== Year end world top 10 players ==
Rank	2011	
1	(England) Nick Matthew	1716.750
2	(England) James Willstrop	1392.250
3	(France) Grégory Gaultier	1050.750
4	(Egypt) Ramy Ashour	1028.250
5	(Egypt) Karim Darwish	980.750
6	(Egypt) Amr Shabana	789.500
7	(England) Peter Barker	644.000
8	(Egypt) Mohamed El Shorbagy	642.875
9	(Australia) David Palmer	485.000
10	(Malaysia) Mohd Azlan Iskandar	465.000

== Retirements ==
Following is a list of notable players (winners of a main tour title, and/or part of the PSA World Rankings top 30 for at least one month) who announced their retirement from professional squash, became inactive, or were permanently banned from playing, during the 2011 season:

- David Palmer (born 28 June 1976 in the Lithgow, New South Wales, Australia) joined the pro tour in 1994, reached the world no. 1 ranking in September 2001. Keeping the spot for four month in 2001. He won two World Open titles in 2002 against John White and in 2006 against Grégory Gaultier. The Australian also won four British Open titles in 2001, 2003, 2004 and 2008. He retired in November after losing in quarter final of the World Open.
- Stewart Boswell (born 29 July 1978 in Canberra, Australia) joined the pro tour in 1996, reached the singles no. 4 spot in May 2002. He won 9 PSA World Tour titles including three Australian Open, two Berkshire Open and reached, in 2002, the final of the prestigious US Open lost against David Palmer. He retired in December after losing in quarter final of the Kuwait PSA Cup.
- Stefan Casteleyn (born 25 February 1974 in Brussels, Belgium) joined the pro tour in 1993, reached the singles no. 7 spot in December 1999. He won a total of nineteen Belgium Nationals. He retired the PSA World Tour in December 2011.

== See also ==
- PSA World Series 2011
- 2011 Men's World Team Squash Championships
- PSA World Tour
- PSA World Rankings
- PSA World Series Finals
- PSA World Open
- 2011 Men's World Team
