= Kuwait PSA Cup 2011 =

- 6th Kuwait PSA Cup

Details
- Event name: Kuwait PSA Cup 2011
- Location: Kuwait City Kuwait
- Website www.sheikhasquash.com

Men's Winner
- Category: World Series Platinum
- Prize money: $165,000
- Year: World Tour 2011

The Kuwait PSA Cup 2011 is the men's edition of the 2011 Kuwait PSA Cup, which is a PSA World Series event Platinum (prize money: $165,000). The event took place in Kuwait City in Kuwait from 23 to 29 November 2011. James Willstrop won his first Kuwait PSA Cup trophy, beating Karim Darwish in the final.

== Prize money and ranking points ==
For 2011, the prize purse was $165,000. The prize money and points breakdown is as follows:

Prize money Kuwait PSA Cup (2011)
Event	W	F	SF	QF	3R	2R	1R
Points (PSA)	2625	1725	1050	640	375	190	115
Prize money	$25,125	$16,125	$9,750	$5,815	$3,375	$1,685	$750

== Seeds ==
1. (England) Nick Matthew (quarterfinals)
2. (Egypt) Karim Darwish (final)
3. (England) James Willstrop (champion)
4. (Egypt) Amr Shabana (second round)
5. (France) Grégory Gaultier (semifinals)
6. (England) Peter Barker (quarterfinals)
7. (Egypt) Mohamed El Shorbagy (semifinals)
8. (France) Thierry Lincou (third round)
9. (England) Daryl Selby (third round)
10. (Netherlands) Laurens Jan Anjema (quarterfinals)
11. (Egypt) Omar Mosaad (third round)
12. (Malaysia) Mohd Azlan Iskandar (third round)

== Draw and results ==
=== Finals ===
After draw

Quarter finals
5	(France) Grégory Gaultier	8	11	11	11
15	(Australia) Stewart Boswell	11	5	2	5
8	(England) James Willstrop	11	11	11
3	(England) Peter Barker	9	7	7
1	(England) Nick Matthew	wo
2	(Egypt) Karim Darwish
7	(Egypt) Mohd El Shorbagy	11	11	7	11
10	(Netherlands) Laurens Jan Anjema	8	5	11	7

Semi finals
5	(France) Grégory Gaultier	9	6	3
3	(England) James Willstrop	11	11	11
2	(Egypt) Karim Darwish	11	11	5	15
6	(Egypt) Mohd El Shorbagy	4	9	11	13

Final
3	(England) James Willstrop	11	10	11	11
2	(Egypt) Karim Darwish	9	12	4	2

=== Top half ===
==== Section 1 ====
Round 1							Round 2					Round 3
							1	(England) Nick Matthew	11	11	11
	(France) Grégoire Marche	8	11	6	11	6		(Switzerland) Nicolas Müller	6	3	1
24	(Switzerland) Nicolas Müller	11	5	11	6	11						1	(England) Nick Matthew	11	11	11
(England) Chris Ryder		11	11	11								13	(Australia) Cameron Pilley	7	9	8
(Egypt) A. Wagih Shoukry		7	4	6				(England) Chris Ryder	8	9	6
							13	(Australia) Cameron Pilley	11	11	11

==== Section 2 ====
Round 1						Round 2							Round 3
						9	(England) Daryl Selby	9	11	11	5	11
	(Colombia) Miguel Angel Rodriguez	5	12	5		WC	(Kuwait) Abdullah Al Muzayen	11	3	9	11	9
WC	(Kuwait) Abdullah Al Muzayen	11	14	11									9	(England) Daryl Selby	7	7	11	8
20	(England) Tom Richards	11	8	6	9								7	(Egypt) Mohd El Shorbagy	11	11	5	11
	(Spain) Borja Golán	7	11	11	11		(Spain) Borja Golán	10	7	11	11	10
						7	(Egypt) Mohd El Shorbagy	12	11	5	2	12

==== Section 3 ====
Round 1							Round 2						Round 3
							8	(France) Thierry Lincou	11	13	11
	(England) Robbie Temple	7	13	6	10		17	(Finland) Olli Tuominen	6	11	6
17	(Finland) Olli Tuominen	11	11	11	12								8	(France) Thierry Lincou	9	11	12	2	9
21	(Egypt) Tarek Momen	9	11	11	7	5							10	(Netherlands) Laurens Jan Anjema	11	3	10	11	11
	(India) Saurav Ghosal	11	6	8	11	11		(India) Saurav Ghosal	5	11	10	2
							10	(Netherlands) Laurens Jan Anjema	11	9	12	11

==== Section 4 ====
Round 1						Round 2							Round 3
						16	(Botswana) Alister Walker	6	11	11	8	11
(Hungary) Márk Krajcsák	5	7	7				(France) Mathieu Castagnet	11	6	7	11	8
(France) Mathieu Castagnet	11	11	11										16	(Botswana) Alister Walker	7	5	3
(New Zealand) Campbell Grayson	11	6	4	11	8								3	(England) James Willstrop	11	11	11
(England) Chris Simpson	9	11	11	5	11		(England) Chris Simpson	0	8	9
						3	(England) James Willstrop	11	11	11

=== Bottom half ===
==== Section 1 ====
Round 1						Round 2					Round 3
						4	(Egypt) Amr Shabana	8	7	6
	(Egypt) Marwan El Shorbagy	11	7	8	9	22	(Germany) Simon Rösner	11	11	11
22	(Germany) Simon Rösner	4	11	11	11						22	(Germany) Simon Rösner	11	5	10	10
(Egypt) Mohd Ali Anwar Reda		3	5	9							15	(Australia) Stewart Boswell	7	11	12	12
(South Africa) Stephen Coppinger		11	11	11			(South Africa) Stephen Coppinger	5	6	6
						15	(Australia) Stewart Boswell	11	11	11

==== Section 2 ====
Round 1						Round 2					Round 3
						12	(Malaysia) Mohd Azlan Iskandar	11	11	11
	(New Zealand) Martin Knight	11	2	8	4	18	(England) Jonathan Kemp	3	4	9
18	(England) Jonathan Kemp	9	11	11	11						12	(Malaysia) Mohd Azlan Iskandar	4	7	5
(Egypt) Karim Abdel Gawad		11	9	6	10						5	(France) Grégory Gaultier	11	11	11
(Egypt) Omar Abdel Aziz		8	11	11	12		(Egypt) Omar Abdel Aziz	7	2	6
						5	(France) Grégory Gaultier	11	11	11

==== Section 3 ====
Round 1						Round 2							Round 3
						6	(England) Peter Barker	11	11	11
(Czech Republic) Jan Koukal		9	11	11	11		(Czech Republic) Jan Koukal	5	6	7
(Scotland) Alan Clyne		11	5	7	8								6	(England) Peter Barker	11	11	11
23	(Malaysia) Ong Beng Hee	6	7	9									14	(England) Adrian Grant	6	5	1
	(Australia) Ryan Cuskelly	11	11	11			(Australia) Ryan Cuskelly	6	13	11	4	3
						14	(England) Adrian Grant	11	11	5	11	11

==== Section 4 ====
Round 1					Round 2						Round 3
					11	(Egypt) Omar Mosaad	11	11	11	11
(Pakistan) Farhan Mehboob	3	4	7			(Hong Kong) Max Lee	8	13	7	5
(Hong Kong) Max Lee	11	11	11								11	(Egypt) Omar Mosaad	5	5	7
(Egypt) Mohammed Abbas	11	11	9	11							2	(Egypt) Karim Darwish	11	11	11
(England) Adrian Waller	2	6	11	4		(Egypt) Mohammed Abbas	5	4	5
					2	(Egypt) Karim Darwish	11	11	11

== See also ==
- Kuwait PSA Cup
- 2011 Men's World Open Squash Championship
- PSA World Tour 2011
- PSA World Series 2011

Preceded by Hong Kong Squash Open; Hong Kong; 2011	PSA World Series 2011; Kuwait PSA Cup; Kuwait (Kuwait City); 2011	Succeeded by Punj Lloyd PSA Masters; India (New Delhi); 2011
