= Men's United States Open (squash) 2011 =

US Open 2011
- 24th PSA U.S. Open

Details
- Event name: Delaware Investments United States Open 2011
- Location: (United States) Philadelphia, Pennsylvania
- Venue: Daskalakis Athletic Center
- Website www.usopensquash.com/philadelphia/

Men's Winner
- Category: World Series Gold
- Prize money: $115,000
- Year: World Tour 2011

The Men's United States Squash Open 2011 was the men's edition of the 2011 United States Open (squash), which is a PSA World Series event Gold (Prize money: $115,000). The event took place at the Daskalakis Athletic Center in Philadelphia, Pennsylvania in the United States from 30 September to 6 October. Amr Shabana won his second US Open trophy, beating Nick Matthew in the final.

== Prize money and ranking points ==
For 2011, the prize purse was $115,000. The prize money and points breakdown is as follows:

Prize Money US Open (2011)
Event	W	F	SF	QF	2R	1R
Points (PSA)	2015	1325	805	490	290	145
Prize money	$17,500	$11,500	$7,000	$4,250	$2,500	$1,250

== Seeds ==
1. (England) Nick Matthew (final)
2. (Egypt) Karim Darwish (first round)
3. (England) James Willstrop (semifinals)
4. (Egypt) Amr Shabana (champion)
5. (England) Peter Barker (quarterfinals)
6. (France) Thierry Lincou (semifinals)
7. (Egypt) Mohamed El Shorbagy (quarterfinals)
8. (Australia) David Palmer (second round)

== Draw and results ==
First round
1	(England) Nick Matthew	11	11	11
Q	(Australia) Zac Alexander	4	5	8
(Australia) Cameron Pilley	9	8	8
(Egypt) Omar Mosaad	11	11	11
(England) Tom Richards	7	11	11	13
Q	(Egypt) Tarek Momen	11	3	9	11
(Australia) Stewart Boswell	11	11	7	5	4
7	(Egypt) Mohd El Shorbagy	8	9	11	11	11
5	(England) Peter Barker	11	11	11
(Finland) Olli Tuominen	3	2	9
(Egypt) Hisham Ashour	11	12	9	11
Q	(Scotland) Alan Clyne	8	10	11	4
(England) Daryl Selby	7	11	11	11
Q	(Germany) Simon Rösner	11	5	9	3
(Botswana) Alister Walker	9	8	10
3	(England) James Willstrop	12	11	11
4	(Egypt) Amr Shabana	11	11	9	11
(Egypt) Wael El Hindi	7	4	11	5
(England) Adrian Grant	11	11	11
Q	(Canada) Shawn Delierre	10	5	4
(Netherlands) Laurens Jan Anjema	11	11	11
Q	(England) Chris Ryder	6	7	5
Q	(Australia) Ryan Cuskelly	8	9	9
8	(Australia) David Palmer	11	11	11
6	(France) Thierry Lincou	11	11	11
WC	(United States) Christopher Gordon	9	5	6
(Egypt) Mohd Ali Anwar Reda	9	13	11	5	5
(Colombia) Miguel Á. Rodriguez	11	11	3	11	11
(England) Jonathan Kemp	wo
Q	(Switzerland) Nicolas Müller
(Malaysia) Mohd Azlan Iskandar	11	5	11	7
2	(Egypt) Karim Darwish	4	11	7	2

Second round
1	(England) Nick Matthew	11	11	11
(Egypt) Omar Mosaad	8	3	5
(England) Tom Richards	2	6	11	4
7	(Egypt) Mohd El Shorbagy	11	11	8	11
5	(England) Peter Barker	11	11	11
(Egypt) Hisham Ashour	9	6	4
(England) Daryl Selby	7	5	6
3	(England) James Willstrop	11	11	11
4	(Egypt) Amr Shabana	6	11	11	11
(England) Adrian Grant	11	6	5	7
(Netherlands) Laurens Jan Anjema	7	11	11	11
8	(Australia) David Palmer	11	5	3	9
6	(France) Thierry Lincou	7	11	11	13
(Colombia) Miguel Á. Rodriguez	11	6	4	11
Q	(Switzerland) Nicolas Müller	6	7	3
(Malaysia) Mohd Azlan Iskandar	11	11	11

Quarter finals
1	(England) Nick Matthew	11	9	11	11
7	(Egypt) Mohd El Shorbagy	5	11	3	6
5	(England) Peter Barker	11	5	6	7
3	(England) James Willstrop	7	11	11	11
4	(Egypt) Amr Shabana	5	11	11	15
(Netherlands) Laurens Jan Anjema	11	6	4	13
6	(France) Thierry Lincou	6	11	11	11
(Malaysia) Mohd Azlan Iskandar	11	5	5	8

Semi finals
1	(England) Nick Matthew *	11	11	7	11
3	(England) James Willstrop	9	7	11	7
Final
1	(England) Nick Matthew	11	8	2	4
4	(Egypt) Amr Shabana *	9	11	11	11
4	(Egypt) Amr Shabana *	11	9	11	11
6	(France) Thierry Lincou	1	11	6	7

== See also ==
- United States Open (squash)
- 2011 Men's World Open Squash Championship
- Women's United States Open (squash) 2011
- PSA World Series 2011

Preceded by British Grand Prix; England (Manchester); 2011	PSA World Series 2011; United States Open; USA (Philadelphia); 2011	Succeeded by Qatar Classic; Qatar (Doha); 2011
