= North American Open 2011 =

- 38th North American Open

Details
- Event name: North American Open 2011
- Location: Richmond, Virginia United States
- Venue: Westwood Club
- Website naosquash.com

Men's Winner
- Category: World Series Gold
- Prize money: $115,000
- Year: World Tour 2011

The North American Open 2011 is the men's edition of the 2011 North American Open, which is a PSA World Series event Gold (prize money: $115,000). The event took place at the Westwood Club in Richmond, Virginia in the United States from 20 February to 26 February. Nick Matthew won his second North American Open trophy, beating Ramy Ashour in the final.

== Prize money and ranking points ==
For 2011, the prize purse was $115,000. The prize money and points breakdown is as follows:

Prize money North American Open (2011)
| Event | W | F | SF | QF | 2R | 1R |
| Points (PSA) | 2015 | 1325 | 805 | 490 | 290 | 145 |
| Prize money | $17,500 | $11,500 | $7,000 | $4,250 | $2,500 | $1,250 |

== Seeds ==
1. (England) Nick Matthew (champion)
2. (Egypt) Ramy Ashour (final)
3. (England) James Willstrop (semifinals)
4. (Egypt) Amr Shabana (semifinals)
5. (France) Grégory Gaultier (quarterfinals)
6. (England) Peter Barker (quarterfinals)
7. (England) Daryl Selby (first round)
8. (Egypt) Wael El Hindi (first round)

== Draw and results ==
First round
1 | (England) Nick Matthew | 9 | 11 | 11 | 11
Q | (United States) Julian Illingworth | 11 | 6 | 6 | 7
(Canada) Shahier Razik | 11 | 11 | 11
WC | (United States) Gilly Lane | 10 | 7 | 7
(Australia) Stewart Boswell | 10 | 9 | 11 | 4
(Botswana) Alister Walker | 11 | 11 | 5 | 11
(Australia) David Palmer | 11 | 11 | 11
8 | (Egypt) Wael El Hindi | 2 | 8 | 7
7 | (England) Daryl Selby | 11 | 4 | 3 | 5
(Malaysia) Mohd Azlan Iskandar | 9 | 11 | 11 | 11
(Germany) Simon Rösner | 11 | 11 | 9 | 11
(England) Joey Barrington | 3 | 8 | 11 | 5
(England) Jonathan Kemp | 11 | 11 | 11
Q | (Mexico) Cesar Salazar | 7 | 5 | 5
(Mexico) Arturo Salazar | 8 | 8 | 5
4 | (Egypt) Amr Shabana | 11 | 11 | 11
3 | (England) James Willstrop | 12 | 11 | 11
Q | (France) Yann Perrin | 10 | 8 | 6
Q | (New Zealand) Martin Knight | 11 | 2 | 11 | 11
Q | (France) Mathieu Castagnet | 7 | 11 | 7 | 7
Q | (Malaysia) Mohd Nafi. Adnan | 6 | 11 | 11 | 6 | 13
Q | (Italy) Stéphane Galifi | 11 | 8 | 5 | 11 | 11
(Egypt) Omar Abdel Aziz | 2 | 6 | 4
6 | (England) Peter Barker | 11 | 11 | 11
5 | (France) Grégory Gaultier
Q | (Australia) Aaron Frankcomb | 4 | 6 | 4
(Finland) Olli Tuominen | 11 | 10 | 11 | 11
(Egypt) Mohammed Abbas | 8 | 12 | 2 | 9
(Egypt) Hisham Ashour | 11 | 13 | 8 | 7
(England) Tom Richards | 9 | 15 | 11 | 11
(Switzerland) Nicolas Müller | 14 | 5 | 5 | 10
2 | (Egypt) Ramy Ashour | 12 | 11 | 11 | 12

Second round
1 | (England) Nick Matthew | 11 | 11 | 11
(Canada) Shahier Razik | 7 | 4 | 8
(Botswana) Alister Walker | 6 | 11 | 6 | 9
(Australia) David Palmer | 11 | 3 | 11 | 11
(Malaysia) Mohd Azlan Iskandar | 9 | 11 | 11 | 11
(Germany) Simon Rösner | 11 | 1 | 5 | 7
(England) Jonathan Kemp | 8 | 15 | 11 | 7 | 8
4 | (Egypt) Amr Shabana | 11 | 13 | 8 | 11 | 11
3 | (England) James Willstrop | 11 | 11 | 11
Q | (New Zealand) Martin Knight | 7 | 7 | 5
Q | (Malaysia) Mohd Nafi. Adnan | 2 | 3 | 5
6 | (England) Peter Barker | 11 | 11 | 11
5 | (France) Grégory Gaultier | 11 | 11 | 11
(Finland) Olli Tuominen | 6 | 6 | 1
(England) Tom Richards | 11 | 10 | 6 | 9
2 | (Egypt) Ramy Ashour | 6 | 12 | 11 | 11

Quarter finals
1 | (England) Nick Matthew | 8
(Australia) David Palmer | 9
(Malaysia) Mohd Azlan Iskandar | 7 | 11 | 10 | 10
4 | (Egypt) Amr Shabana | 11 | 6 | 12 | 12
3 | (England) James Willstrop | 7 | 11 | 11 | 11
6 | (England) Peter Barker | 11 | 4 | 4 | 5
5 | (France) Grégory Gaultier | 5 | 11 | 4 | 11 | 8
2 | (Egypt) Ramy Ashour | 11 | 9 | 11 | 6 | 11

Semi finals
1 | (England) Nick Matthew | 11 | 5 | 11 | 11
4 | (Egypt) Amr Shabana | 8 | 11 | 6 | 5
Final
1 | (England) Nick Matthew | 11 | 11 | 8 | 8 | 11
2 | (Egypt) Ramy Ashour | 9 | 5 | 11 | 11 | 6
3 | (England) James Willstrop | 8 | 10 | 11 | 6
2 | (Egypt) Ramy Ashour | 11 | 12 | 5 | 11

== See also ==
- North American Open
- PSA World Series 2011

| Preceded by Tournament of Champions; USA (New York); 2011 | PSA World Series 2011; North American Open; USA (Richmond); 2011 | Succeeded by Australian Open; Australia (Canberra); 2011 |
