= Tournament of Champions 2011 =

- 77th Tournament of Champions

Details
- Event name: J. P. Morgan Tournament of Champions 2011
- Location: New York City United States
- Venue: Grand Central Terminal
- Website www.tocsquash.com

Men's Winner
- Category: World Series Gold
- Prize money: $115,000
- Year: World Tour 2011

The Men's J. P. Morgan Tournament of Champions 2011 is the men's edition of the 2011 Tournament of Champions, which is a PSA World Series event Gold (Prize money: $115,000). The event took place at the Grand Central Terminal in New York City in the United States from 21 January to 27 January. Ramy Ashour won his second Tournament of Champions trophy, beating Nick Matthew in the final.

== Prize money and ranking points ==
For 2011, the prize purse was $115,000. The prize money and points breakdown is as follows:

Prize Money Tournament of Champions (2011)
Event	W	F	SF	QF	2R	1R
Points (PSA)	2015	1325	805	490	290	145
Prize money	$17,500	$11,500	$7,000	$4,250	$2,500	$1,250

== Seeds ==
1. (Egypt) Ramy Ashour (Champion)
2. (England) Nick Matthew (Final)
3. (England) James Willstrop (Semifinals)
4. (Egypt) Amr Shabana (Semifinals)
5. (England) Peter Barker (Quarterfinals)
6. (Netherlands) Laurens Jan Anjema (Quarterfinals)
7. (Egypt) Mohamed El Shorbagy (Quarterfinals)
8. (Australia) David Palmer (Quarterfinals)

== Draw and results ==
First round
1	(Egypt) Ramy Ashour	12	11	11
(Finland) Olli Tuominen	10	3	8
(India) Saurav Ghosal	6	8	16	5
(Australia) Stewart Boswell	11	11	14	11
(Malaysia) Ong Beng Hee	6	10	10
Q	(England) Tom Richards	11	12	12
WC	(United States) Julian Illingworth	8	7	9
8	(Australia) David Palmer	11	11	11
7	(Egypt) Mohd El Shorbagy	11	11	11
(Malaysia) Mohd Azlan Iskandar	8	8	10
(Canada) Shahier Razik	11	6	8	11	11
Q	(England) Chris Ryder	6	11	11	7	5
Q	(Spain) Borja Golán	11	11	11
Q	(Egypt) Tarek Momen	9	7	5
(England) Jonathan Kemp	6	7	5
3	(England) James Willstrop	11	11	11
4	(Egypt) Amr Shabana	7	11	11	11
Q	(Egypt) Mohammed Abbas	11	8	9	7
Q	(Australia) Ryan Cuskelly	11	1	2	4
(England) Daryl Selby	4	11	11	11
Q	(Switzerland) Nicolas Müller	11	11	7	11
(England) Adrian Grant	7	5	11	8
(Colombia) Miguel Á. Rodriguez	5	8	6
6	(Netherlands) Laurens Jan Anjema	11	11	11
(England) Peter Barker	11	11	11
(Egypt) Mohd Ali Anwar Reda	5	5	4
Q	(Egypt) Hisham Ashour	8	11	8	14	11
(Australia) Cameron Pilley	11	7	11	12	6
(Botswana) Alister Walker	7	11	11	11
(Egypt) Wael El Hindi	11	7	6	6
(Egypt) Omar Mosaad	5	9	7
2	(England) Nick Matthew	11	11	11

Second round
1	(Egypt) Ramy Ashour	8	11	11	11
(Australia) Stewart Boswell	11	6	8	8
Q	(England) Tom Richards	10	9	8
8	(Australia) David Palmer	12	11	11
7	(Egypt) Mohd El Shorbagy	11	11	11
(Canada) Shahier Razik	9	5	6
Q	(Spain) Borja Golán	6	4	6
3	(England) James Willstrop	11	11	11
4	(Egypt) Amr Shabana	11	11	11
(England) Daryl Selby	6	8	8
Q	(Switzerland) Nicolas Müller	9	4	3
6	(Netherlands) Laurens Jan Anjema	11	11	11
5	(England) Peter Barker	10	13	11	12	11
Q	(Egypt) Hisham Ashour	12	15	9	10	2
(Botswana) Alister Walker	5	8	5
2	(England) Nick Matthew	11	11	11

Quarter finals
1	(Egypt) Ramy Ashour	9	11	11	11
8	(Australia) David Palmer	11	5	6	8
7	(Egypt) Mohd El Shorbagy	8	7	8
3	(England) James Willstrop	11	11	11
4	(Egypt) Amr Shabana	11	11	9	11
6	(Netherlands) Laurens Jan Anjema	7	11	8	8
5	(England) Peter Barker	9	4	6
2	(England) Nick Matthew	11	11	11

Semi finals
1	(Egypt) Ramy Ashour	11	11	11
3	(England) James Willstrop	4	9	8
Final
1	(Egypt) Ramy Ashour	11	7	11	11
2	(England) Nick Matthew	3	11	9	7
4	(Egypt) Amr Shabana	8	4	11	14	10
2	(England) Nick Matthew	11	11	7	12	12

== See also ==
- Tournament of Champions (squash)
- PSA World Series 2011

Preceded by Punj Lloyd PSA Masters; India (New Delhi); 2010	PSA World Series 2011; Tournament of Champions; USA (New York); 2011	Succeeded by North American Open; USA (Richmond); 2011
