= Men's Hong Kong squash Open 2011 =

Cathay Pacific Hong Kong Open 2011
- 25th PSA Hong Kong Open

Details
- Event name: Cathay Pacific Sun Hung Kai Financial Hong Kong Open 2011
- Location: Hong Kong
- Venue: Hong Kong Squash Centre
- Website hksquash.org.hk/hkopen2011

Men's Winner
- Category: World Series Platinum
- Prize money: $150,000
- Year: World Tour 2011

The Men's Cathay Pacific Hong Kong Open 2011 is the men's edition of the 2011 Hong Kong Open, which is a PSA World Series event Platinum (Prize money: $150,000). The event took place in Hong Kong from 15 to 20 November. James Willstrop won his first Hong Kong Open trophy, beating Karim Darwish in the final.

== Prize money and ranking points ==
For 2011, the prize purse was $150,000. The prize money and points breakdown is as follows:

Prize Money Hong Kong Open (2011)
| Event | W | F | SF | QF | 2R | 1R |
| Points (PSA) | 2625 | 1725 | 1050 | 640 | 375 | 190 |
| Prize money | $23,625 | $15,525 | $9,450 | $5,740 | $3,375 | $1,690 |

== Seeds ==
1. (England) Nick Matthew (quarter-finals)
2. (Egypt) Karim Darwish (final)
3. (England) James Willstrop(champion)
4. (Egypt) Amr Shabana (quarter-finals)
5. (France) Grégory Gaultier (semi-finals)
6. (England) Peter Barker (quarter-finals)
7. (Egypt) Mohamed El Shorbagy (second round)
8. (France) Thierry Lincou (first round)

== Draw and results ==
First round
1 | (England) Nick Matthew | 11 | 11 | 11
Q | (New Zealand) Martin Knight | 6 | 4 | 7
(India) Saurav Ghosal | 11 | 11 | 7 | 4 | 3
(England) Daryl Selby | 9 | 8 | 11 | 11 | 11
(Pakistan) Aamir Atlas Khan | 8 | 4 | 8
(Egypt) Omar Mosaad | 11 | 11 | 11
(United States) Julian Illingworth | 6 | 6 | 11 | 3
5 | (France) Grégory Gaultier | 11 | 11 | 9 | 11
6 | (England) Peter Barker | 7 | 12 | 9 | 11 | 11
(Netherlands) Laurens Jan Anjema | 11 | 10 | 11 | 5 | 9
(Australia) Cameron Pilley | 11 | 11 | 3 | 11
WC | (Hong Kong) Max Lee | 2 | 8 | 11 | 6
(Finland) Olli Tuominen | 11 | 11 | 11
Q | (Spain) Borja Golán | 7 | 9 | 5
(England) Jonathan Kemp | 11 | 6 | 5
3 | (England) James Willstrop | 11 | 11 | 11
4 | (Egypt) Amr Shabana | 11 | 11 | 3 | 11
Q | (Malaysia) Mohd Nafi. Adnan | 8 | 9 | 11 | 1
(Egypt) Hisham Ashour | 11 | 11 | 7 | 11
(Malaysia) Ong Beng Hee | 6 | 7 | 11 | 9
(Malaysia) Mohd Azlan Iskandar | 11 | 11 | 11
Q | (France) Grégoire Marche | 4 | 7 | 1
Q | (Scotland) Alan Clyne | 8 | 8 | 6
7 | (Egypt) Mohd El Shorabgy | 11 | 11 | 11
8 | (France) Thierry Lincou | 3 | 9 | 5
(Australia) Stewart Boswell | 11 | 11 | 11
(England) Tom Richards | 8 | 11 | 11 | 2 | 12
Q | (France) Mathieu Castagnet | 11 | 5 | 8 | 11 | 10
(Switzerland) Nicolas Müller | 17 | 4 | 8 | 7
Q | (Egypt) Tarek Momen | 15 | 11 | 11 | 11
Q | (Malaysia) Ivan Yuen | 5 | 5 | 4
2 | (Egypt) Karim Darwish | 11 | 11 | 11

Second round
1 | (England) Nick Matthew | 11 | 11 | 11
(England) Daryl Selby | 10 | 7 | 8
(Egypt) Omar Mosaad | 6 | 11 | 4 | 6
5 | (France) Grégory Gaultier | 11 | 4 | 11 | 11
6 | (England) Peter Barker | 11 | 11 | 11
(Australia) Cameron Pilley | 8 | 7 | 4
(Finland) Olli Tuominen | 3 | 8 | 6
3 | (England) James Willstrop | 11 | 11 | 11
4 | (Egypt) Amr Shabana | 11 | 11 | 12
(Egypt) Hisham Ashour | 5 | 7 | 10
(Malaysia) Mohd Azlan Iskandar | 6 | 11 | 14 | 11
7 | (Egypt) Mohd El Shorbagy | 11 | 6 | 12 | 7
(Australia) Stewart Boswell | 11 | 11 | 11
(England) Tom Richards | 4 | 9 | 0
Q | (Egypt) Tarek Momen | 3 | 2 | 7
2 | (Egypt) Karim Darwish | 11 | 11 | 5 | 11

Quarter finals
1 | (England) Nick Matthew | 11 | 9 | 11 | 5
5 | (France) Grégory Gaultier | 7 | 11 | 13 | 11
6 | (England) Peter Barker | 3 | 8 | 0
3 | (England) James Willstrop | 11 | 11 | 3
4 | (Egypt) Amr Shabana | 9 | 5 | 6
(Malaysia) Mohd Azlan Iskandar | 11 | 11 | 11
(Australia) Stewart Boswell | 5 | 4 | 6
2 | (Egypt) Karim Darwish | 11 | 11 | 11

Semi-finals
5 | (France) Grégory Gaultier | 9 | 9 | 1
3 | (England) James Willstrop | 11 | 11 | 11
Final
3 | (England) James Willstrop | 11 | 11 | 11
2 | (Egypt) Karim Darwish | 5 | 9 | 4
(Malaysia) Mohd Azlan Iskandar | 3 | 8 | 2
2 | (Egypt) Karim Darwish | 11 | 11 | 11

== See also ==
- Hong Kong Open (squash)
- Women's Hong Kong squash Open 2011
- 2011 Men's World Open Squash Championship
- PSA World Tour 2011
- PSA World Series 2011

| Preceded by Qatar Classic; Qatar (Doha); 2011 | PSA World Series 2011; Hong Kong Squash Open; Hong Kong; 2011 | Succeeded by Kuwait PSA Cup; Kuwait (Kuwait City) 2011 |
