= PSA Masters 2011 =

Punj Lloyd PSA Masters 2011
- 10th PSA Masters

Details
- Event name: Punj Lloyd PSA Masters 2011
- Location: New Delhi India
- Website www.punjlloydpsamasters.com

Men's Winner
- Category: World Series Platinum
- Prize money: $165,000
- Year: World Tour 2011

The Punj Lloyd PSA Masters 2011 is the men's edition of the 2012 PSA Masters, which is a PSA World Series event Platinum (Prize money: $165,000). The event took place in New Delhi in India from 12 to 18 December. James Willstrop won his first PSA Masters trophy, beating Grégory Gaultier in the final.

== Prize money and ranking points ==
For 2011, the prize purse was $165,000. The prize money and points breakdown is as follows:

Prize Money Punj Lloyd PSA Masters (2011)
Event	W	F	SF	QF	2R	1R
Points (PSA)	2625	1725	1050	640	375	190
Prize money	$28,875	$18,975	$11,550	$7,015	$4,125	$2,060

== Seeds ==
1. (Egypt) Ramy Ashour (Quarterfinals)
2. (Egypt) Karim Darwish (Quarterfinals)
3. (England) James Willstrop (Champion)
4. (France) Grégory Gaultier (Final)
5. (England) Peter Barker (Semifinals)
6. (Egypt) Mohamed El Shorbagy (Semifinals)
7. (England) Daryl Selby (Quarterfinals)
8. (Netherlands) Laurens Jan Anjema (Quarterfinals)

== Draw and results ==
First round
1	(Egypt) Ramy Ashour	9	11	11	11
(Malaysia) Mohd Nafi. Adnan	11	3	4	9
(Australia) Cameron Pilley	11	9	11	13
(England) Jonathan Kemp	5	11	4	11
(India) Saurav Ghosal	12	11	11
(United States) Julian Illingworth	10	4	2
(Finland) Olli Tuominen	5	4	1
5	(England) Peter Barker	11	11	11
7	(England) Daryl Selby	11	11	11
(Egypt) Mohammed Abbas	4	5	9
(Germany) Simon Rösner	11	11	11
(Egypt) Omar Abdel Aziz	7	6	4
(Botswana) Alister Walker	11	11	11
(Scotland) Alan Clyne	5	6	5
(Switzerland) Nicolas Müller	11	7	5	5
3	(England) James Willstrop	8	11	11	11
4	(France) Grégory Gaultier	11	11	11
WC	(India) Siddharth Suchde	4	1	6
(Malaysia) Ong Beng Hee	6	9	8
(Malaysia) Mohd Azlan Iskandar	11	11	11
(Egypt) Omar Mosaad	8	11	11	11
(England) Chris Ryder	11	3	7	9
(Egypt) Mohd Ali Anwar Reda	7	6	9
8	(Netherlands) Laurens Jan Anjema	11	11	11
6	(Egypt) Mohd El Shorbagy	11	13	11	11
(South Africa) Stephen Coppinger	7	15	6	5
(England) Adrian Grant	10	6	4
(Spain) Borja Golán	12	11	11
(Egypt) Hisham Ashour	12	10	6
(England) Tom Richards	14	12	11
(Australia) Ryan Cuskelly	10	5	4
2	(Egypt) Karim Darwish	12	11	11

Second round
1	(Egypt) Ramy Ashour	11	12	11	11
(Australia) Cameron Pilley	5	14	2	4
(India) Saurav Ghosal	5	8	11	5
5	(England) Peter Barker	11	11	6	11
7	(England) Daryl Selby	11	11	8	11
(Germany) Simon Rösner	7	6	11	5
(Botswana) Alister Walker	10	4	5
3	(England) James Willstrop	12	11	11
4	(France) Grégory Gaultier	11	11	11
(Malaysia) Mohd Azlan Iskandar	7	6	8
(Egypt) Omar Mosaad	4	11	7	5
8	(Netherlands) Laurens Jan Anjema	11	7	11	11
6	(Egypt) Mohd El Shorbagy	11	11	6	11
(Spain) Borja Golán	6	8	11	7
(England) Tom Richards	11	11	11
2	(Egypt) Karim Darwish	3	4	6

Quarter finals
1	(Egypt) Ramy Ashour	11	11	8	1
5	(England) Peter Barker	13	7	11	11
7	(England) Daryl Selby	7	7	11	5
3	(England) James Willstrop	11	11	9	11
4	(France) Grégory Gaultier	11	11	11
8	(Netherlands) Laurens Jan Anjema	5	2	5
6	(Egypt) Mohd El Shorbagy	11	8	11	11
2	(Egypt) Karim Darwish	9	11	5	3

Semi finals
5	(England) Peter Barker	4	3	3
3	(England) James Willstrop	11	11	11
Final
3	(England) James Willstrop	19	11	11	6
4	(France) Grégory Gaultier	21	8	4	1
4	(France) Grégory Gaultier	12	11	11
6	(Egypt) Mohd El Shorbagy	10	7	1

== See also ==
- PSA Masters
- 2011 Men's World Open Squash Championship
- PSA World Tour 2011
- PSA World Series 2011
