= British Grand Prix (squash) 2011 =

British Grand Prix 2011
- 6th British Grand Prix

Details
- Event name: ROWE British Grand Prix 2011
- Location: Manchester, England
- Venue: National Squash Centre
- Website www.britishsquashgrandprix.com

Men's Winner
- Category: World Series Gold
- Prize money: $115,000
- Year: World Tour 2011

The British Grand Prix 2011 is the men's edition of the 2011 British Grand Prix (squash), which is a PSA World Series event Gold (Prize money : 115 000 $). The event took place at the National Squash Centre in Manchester in England from 19 to 25 September. Ramy Ashour won his second British Grand Prix trophy, beating Nick Matthew in the final.

== Prize money and ranking points ==
For 2011, the prize purse was $115,000. The prize money and points breakdown is as follows:

Prize Money British Grand Prix (2011)
Event	W	F	SF	QF	2R	1R
Points (PSA)	2015	1325	805	490	290	145
Prize money	$17,500	$11,500	$7,000	$4,250	$2,500	$1,250

== Seeds ==
1. (England) Nick Matthew (final)
2. (Egypt) Ramy Ashour (champion)
3. (Egypt) Karim Darwish (semifinals)
4. (England) James Willstrop (second round)
5. (Egypt) Amr Shabana (semifinals)
6. (France) Grégory Gaultier (quarterfinals)
7. (England) Peter Barker (quarterfinals)
8. (France) Thierry Lincou (second round)

== Draw and results ==
First round
1	(England) Nick Matthew	11	11	11
WC	(Germany) Jens Schoor	3	3	6
(Egypt) M Ali Anwar Reda	11	11	7	7	11
(Malaysia) Ong Beng Hee	7	8	11	11	8
(Malaysia) Mohd Azlan Iskandar	11	11	12
Q	(Egypt) Mohammed Abbas	4	3	10
Q	(South Africa) Stephen Coppinger	7	4	3
7	(England) Peter Barker	11	11	11
5	(Egypt) Amr Shabana	7	11	11	11
(Egypt) Hisham Mohd Ashour	11	4	7	2
(England) Tom Richards	10	8	10
Q	(Germany) Simon Rösner	12	11	12
(Finland) Olli Tuominen	11	6	13	3	2
(England) Adrian Grant	7	11	11	11	11
Q	(Spain) Borja Golán	9	4	11	3
4	(England) James Willstrop	11	11	9	11
3	(Egypt) Karim Darwish	9	11	11	11
(Australia) Stewart Boswell	11	8	5	8
(Botswana) Alister Walker	8	12	6	6
Q	(Egypt) Tarek Momen	11	10	11	11
(Egypt) Omar Mosaad	14	8	11	10	11
(England) Jonathan Kemp	12	11	5	12	9
Q	(Egypt) Marwan El Shorbagy	6	3	7
8	(France) Thierry Lincou	11	11	11
6	(France) Grégory Gaultier	11	11	11
(India) Saurav Ghosal	4	5	2
(England) Daryl Selby	5	9	11	11	11
Q	(Switzerland) Nicolas Müller	11	11	2	9	8
(Pakistan) Aamir Atlas Khan	6	6	5
(Australia) Cameron Pilley	11	11	11
Q	(England) Chris Ryder	8	3	7
2	(Egypt) Ramy Ashour	11	11	11

Second round
1	(England) Nick Matthew	11	11	11
(Egypt) Mohd Ali Anwar Reda	5	4	4
(Malaysia) Mohd Azlan Iskandar	4	9	6
7	(England) Peter Barker	11	11	11
5	(Egypt) Amr Shabana	11	14	4	11
(Germany) Simon Rösner	9	12	11	7
(England) Adrian Grant	10	11	11	11
4	(England) James Willstrop	12	7	9	7
3	(Egypt) Karim Darwish	11	4	11	11
Q	(Egypt) Tarek Momen	7	11	7	4
(Egypt) Omar Mosaad	11	6	2	11	11
8	(France) Thierry Lincou	7	11	11	5	4
6	(France) Grégory Gaultier	11	10	11	11
(England) Daryl Selby	2	12	4	4
(Australia) Cameron Pilley	7	8	14	3
3	(Egypt) Ramy Ashour	11	11	12	11

Quarter finals
1	(England) Nick Matthew	11	15	8	11
7	(England) Peter Barker	5	13	11	7
5	(Egypt) Amr Shabana	11	11	12
(England) Adrian Grant	5	6	10
3	(Egypt) Karim Darwish	11	11	11
(Egypt) Omar Mosaad	6	9	7
6	(France) Grégory Gaultier	10	7	9
2	(Egypt) Ramy Ashour	12	11	11

Semi finals
1	(England) Nick Matthew	11	11	6	11
5	(Egypt) Amr Shabana	8	4	11	3
Final
1	(England) Nick Matthew	11	3	7	4
2	(Egypt) Ramy Ashour	3	11	11	11
3	(Egypt) Karim Darwish	7	11	2	5
2	(Egypt) Ramy Ashour	11	5	11	11

== See also ==
- British Grand Prix (squash)
- 2011 Men's World Open Squash Championship
- PSA World Tour 2011
- PSA World Series

Preceded by Australian Open; Australia (Canberra); 2011	PSA World Series 2011; British Grand Prix; England (Manchester); 2011	Succeeded by United States Open; USA (Philadelphia); 2011
