= 2011 Men's Australian Open (squash) =

Australian Open 2011
- 30th PSA Australian Open

Details
- Event name: Australian Open 2011
- Location: Canberra Australia
- Venue: National Convention Centre
- Website www.australiansquashopen.com

Men's Winner
- Category: World Series Platinum
- Prize money: $150,000
- Year: World Tour 2011

The Men's Australian Open 2011 is the men' edition of the 2011 Australian Open, which is a tournament of the PSA World Series event (Prize money : 150 000 $). The event took place in Canberra in Australia from 8 to 14 August. Ramy Ashour won his first Australian Open trophy, beating Nick Matthew in the final.

== Prize money and ranking points ==
For 2011, the prize purse was $150,000. The prize money and points breakdown is as follows:

Prize Money Australian Open (2011)
Event	W	F	SF	QF	2R	1R
Points (PSA)	2625	1725	1050	640	375	190
Prize money	$23,625	$15,525	$9,450	$5,740	$3,375	$1,690

== Seeds ==
1. (England) Nick Matthew (final)
2. (Egypt) Ramy Ashour (champion)
3. (Egypt) Karim Darwish (quarterfinals)
4. (England) James Willstrop (quarterfinals)
5. (France) Grégory Gaultier (semifinals)
6. (England) Peter Barker (quarterfinals)
7. (France) Thierry Lincou (first round)
8. (Malaysia) Mohd Azlan Iskandar (first round)

== Draw and results ==
First round
1	(England) Nick Matthew	11	11	11
(South Africa) Stephen Coppinger	7	8	9
Q	(New Zealand) Martin Knight	11	8	9	4
(Malaysia) Ong Beng Hee	5	11	11	11
(Switzerland) Nicolas Müller	6	7	11	9
(United States) Julian Illingworth	11	11	7	11
(Netherlands) Laurens Jan Anjema	14	11	14	11
7	(France) Thierry Lincou	16	9	12	5
8	(Malaysia) Mohd Azlan Iskandar	14	11	5	9	8
(Australia) David Palmer	12	9	11	11	11
(Australia) Ryan Cuskelly	9	8	5
(England) Tom Richards	11	11	11
Q	(Hong Kong) Max Lee	6	11	11	11
Q	(Australia) Matthew Karwalski	11	8	10	7
Q	(Australia) Zac Alexander	8	13	2	6
3	(Egypt) Karim Darwish	11	11	11	11
4	(England) James Willstrop	13	11	11
(England) Chris Ryder	11	8	0
Q	(Scotland) Alan Clyne	11	11	11
Q	(Malaysia) Muhd Asyraf Azan	5	9	4
(Germany) Simon Rösner	11	11	9	5	8
(England) Adrian Grant	2	7	11	11	11
(Australia) Cameron Pilley	6	8	7
5	(France) Grégory Gaultier	11	11	11
6	(England) Peter Barker	11	11	11
(Australia) Aaron Frankcomb	8	7	6
Q	(Hong Kong) Dick Lau	7	4	3
(Malaysia) Mohd Nafi. Adnan	11	11	11
(India) Saurav Ghosal	12	2	5
(Australia) Stewart Boswell	14	11	11
Q	(Malaysia) Ivan Yuen	3	7	3
2	(Egypt) Ramy Ashour	11	11	11

Second round
1	(England) Nick Matthew	11	11	11
(Malaysia) Ong Beng Hee	7	8	9
(United States) Julian Illingworth	4	3	3
(Netherlands) Laurens Jan Anjema	11	11	11
(Australia) David Palmer	4	11	11	11
(England) Tom Richards	11	9	6	5
Q	(Hong Kong) Max Lee	5	11	5	7
3	(Egypt) Karim Darwish	11	8	11	11
4	(England) James Willstrop	11	11	11
Q	(Scotland) Alan Clyne	5	5	2
(England) Adrian Grant	7	5	8
5	(France) Grégory Gaultier	11	11	11
6	(England) Peter Barker	11	11	11
(Malaysia) Mohd Nafi. Adnan	4	2	7
(Australia) Stewart Boswell	11	7	8	7
2	(Egypt) Ramy Ashour	9	11	11	11

Quarter finals
1	(England) Nick Matthew	11	11	7	11
(Netherlands) Laurens Jan Anjema	5	9	11	5
(Australia) David Palmer	11	10	11	12
3	(Egypt) Karim Darwish	3	12	8	10
4	(England) James Willstrop	11	10	4	5
5	(France) Grégory Gaultier	7	12	11	11
6	(England) Peter Barker	11	9	4	4
2	(Egypt) Ramy Ashour	5	11	11	11

Semi finals
1	(England) Nick Matthew	11	11	11
(Australia) David Palmer	9	4	5
Final
1	(England) Nick Matthew	14	6	12	8	4
2	(Egypt) Ramy Ashour	12	11	10	11	11
5	(France) Grégory Gaultier	11	9	9	9
2	(Egypt) Ramy Ashour	7	11	11	11

== See also ==
- PSA World Tour 2011
- PSA World Series 2011
- Australian Open (squash)
- 2011 Women's Australian Open (squash)

Preceded by North American Open; USA (Richmond); 2011	PSA World Series 2011; Australian Open; Australia (Canberra); 2011	Succeeded by British Grand Prix; England (Manchester) 2011
