= Men's Qatar Classic 2011 =

Qatar Classic 2011
- 11th PSA Qatar Classic

Details
- Event name: Qatar Classic Squash Championship 2011
- Location: Doha, Qatar
- Venue: Aspire Academy
- Website www.squashsite.co.uk/qatar/

Men's Winner
- Category: World Series Platinum
- Prize money: $150,000
- Year: World Tour 2011

The Men's Qatar Classic 2011 is the men's edition of the 2011 Qatar Classic squash tournament, which is a PSA World Series platinum event ($150,000 prize money). The event took place in Doha from 16 October to 21 October. Grégory Gaultier won his first Qatar Classic trophy, beating James Willstrop in the final.

== Prize money and ranking points ==
For 2011, the prize purse was $150,000. The prize money and points breakdown is as follows:

Prize money Qatar Classic (2011)
Event	W	F	SF	QF	2R	1R
Points (PSA)	2625	1725	1050	640	375	190
Prize money	$23,625	$15,525	$9,450	$5,740	$3,375	$1,690

== Seeds ==
1. (England) Nick Matthew (second round)
2. (Egypt) Ramy Ashour (first round)
3. (Egypt) Karim Darwish (semifinals)
4. (England) James Willstrop (final)
5. (Egypt) Amr Shabana (first round)
6. (France) Grégory Gaultier (champion)
7. (England) Peter Barker (quarterfinals)
8. (Australia) David Palmer (second round)

== Draw and results ==
First round
1	(England) Nick Matthew	11	11	11
(Pakistan) Aamir Atlas Khan	9	4	4
(Egypt) Tarek Momen	15	11	11
Q	(Egypt) Omar Abdel Aziz	13	8	5
(Egypt) Mohd Ali Anwar Reda	8	6	11	1
Q	(India) Siddharth Suchde	11	11	9	11
Q	(Egypt) Mohd Abouelghar	8	3	4
6	(France) Grégory Gaultier	11	11	11
5	(Egypt) Amr Shabana	6	7	4
(Switzerland) Nicolas Müller	11	11	11
(Malaysia) Mohd Azlan Iskandar	11	11	11
WC	(Qatar) Abdulla Al Tamimi	9	4	4
(Finland) Olli Tuominen	0
Q	(Finland) Henrik Mustonen	4
Q	(Malaysia) Kamran Khan	2	2	2
3	(Egypt) Karim Darwish	11	11	11
4	(England) James Willstrop	11	11	11
Q	(Egypt) Mohammed Abbas	6	4	3
(Germany) Simon Rösner	11	11	7	11
Q	(England) Chris Ryder	6	4	11	5
(France) Thierry Lincou	9	7	11	11	11
(Egypt) Hisham Ashour	11	11	9	6	6
(Malaysia) Ong Beng Hee	6	6	11	2
7	(England) Peter Barker	11	11	9	11
8	(Australia) David Palmer	12	11	7	11
(Scotland) Alan Clyne	10	9	11	4
(Australia) Stewart Boswell	11	11	11
Q	(Egypt) Marwan El Shorbagy	7	8	2
(Australia) Cameron Pilley	11	12	11
(India) Saurav Ghosal	6	10	7
(England) Tom Richards	11	11
2	(Egypt) Ramy Ashour	4	6

Second round
1	(England) Nick Matthew	9	10	8
(Egypt) Tarek Momen	11	12	11
Q	(India) Siddharth Suchde	3	3	8
(France) Grégory Gaultier	11	11	11
(Switzerland) Nicolas Müller	11	7	8	11	11
(Malaysia) Mohd Azlan Iskandar	8	11	11	7	6
Q	(Finland) Henrik Mustonen	4	5	5
3	(Egypt) Karim Darwish	11	11	11
4	(England) James Willstrop	11	11	14
(Germany) Simon Rösner	5	2	12
(France) Thierry Lincou	6	3	9
7	(England) Peter Barker	11	11	11
8	(Australia) David Palmer	8	11	6	11	5
(Australia) Stewart Boswell	11	4	11	5	11
(Australia) Cameron Pilley	11	11	13
(England) Tom Richards	7	2	11

* Quarter finals *
(Egypt) Tarek Momen	5	8	7
6	(France) Grégory Gaultier	11	11	11
(Switzerland) Nicolas Müller	11	8	5	4
3	(Egypt) Karim Darwish	2	11	11	11
4	(England) James Willstrop	6	11	11	13
7	(England) Peter Barker	11	7	4	11
(Australia) Stewart Boswell	11	11	4	11
(Australia) Cameron Pilley	8	5	11	4

Semi finals *
6	(France) Grégory Gaultier	11	11	11
3	(Egypt) Karim Darwish	8	4	1
Final
6	(France) Grégory Gaultier *	11	11	2	11
4	(England) James Willstrop	8	7	11	8
4	(England) James Willstrop	11	11	11
(Australia) Stewart Boswell	8	3	9

== See also ==
- Qatar Classic
- Women's Qatar Classic 2011
- 2011 Men's World Open Squash Championship
- PSA World Tour 2011
- PSA World Series 2011

Preceded by US Open; USA (Philadelphia); 2011	PSA World Series 2011; Qatar Classic; Qatar (Doha); 2011	Succeeded by Hong Kong Open; Hong Kong; 2011
