= 2011 PSA World Series =

PSA World Series 2011

Details
- Event name: PSA World Series 2011
- Website psaworldtour.com/page/SuperSeriesRanking
- Year: World Tour 2011

The PSA World Series 2011 is a series of men's squash tournaments which are part of the Professional Squash Association (PSA) World Tour for the 2011 squash season. The PSA World Series tournaments are some of the most prestigious events on the men's tour. The best-performing players in the World Series events qualify for the annual 2011 PSA World Series Finals tournament. Amr Shabana won his first PSA World Series Squash Finals trophy, beating Grégory Gaultier in the final.

== PSA World Series Ranking Points ==
PSA World Series events also have a separate World Series ranking. Points for this are calculated on a cumulative basis after each World Series event. The top eight players at the end of the calendar year are then eligible to play in the PSA World Series Finals.

Tournament			Ranking Points
Rank	Prize Money US$	Ranking Points	Winner	Runner up	3/4	5/8	9/16	17/32
World Series	$115,000-$274,999	625 points	100	65	40	25	15	10

== 2011 Tournaments ==
Tournament	Country	Location	Rank	Prize money	Date	2011 Winner
Tournament of Champions 2011	United States	New York City	World Series Gold	$115,000	January 21–27, 2011	(Egypt) Ramy Ashour
North American Open 2011	United States	Richmond, Virginia	World Series Gold	$115,000	20–26 February 2011	(England) Nick Matthew
Australian Open 2011	Australia	Canberra	World Series Platinum	$150,000	8–14 August 2011	(Egypt) Ramy Ashour
British Grand Prix 2011	England	Manchester	World Series Gold	$115,000	19–25 September 2011	(Egypt) Ramy Ashour
US Open 2011	United States	Philadelphia	World Series Gold	$115,000	30 September - 6 October 2011	(Egypt) Amr Shabana
Qatar Classic 2011	Qatar	Doha	World Series Platinum	$150,000	16–21 October 2011	(France) Grégory Gaultier
Hong Kong Open 2011	Hong Kong	Hong Kong	World Series Platinum	$150,000	15–20 November 2011	(England) James Willstrop
Kuwait PSA Cup 2011	Kuwait	Kuwait	World Series Platinum	$165,000	23–29 November 2011	(England) James Willstrop
PSA Masters 2011	India	New Delhi	World Series Platinum	$165,000	12–18 December 2011	(England) James Willstrop

== World Series Standings 2011 ==
Performance Table Legend
10	1st Round	15	2nd Round
25	Quarterfinalist	40	Semifinalist
65	Runner-up	**100**	Winner

**Top 16 World Series Standings 2011**
Rank	Player	Number of Tournament	Tournament of Champions	North American Open	Australian Open	British Grand Prix	US Open	Qatar Classic	Hong Kong Open	Kuwait PSA Cup	Punj Lloyd PSA Masters	Total Points
Rank	Player	Number of Tournament	USA (United States)	USA (United States)	AUS (Australia)	ENG (England)	USA (United States)	QAT (Qatar)	HKG (Hong Kong)	KUW (Kuwait)	IND (India)	Total Points
1	(England) **James Willstrop**	9	40	40	25	15	40	65	**100**	**100**	**100**	**525**
2	(England) Nick Matthew	8	65	**100**	65	65	65	15	25	25	-	**425**
3	(Egypt) Ramy Ashour	6	**100**	65	**100**	**100**	-	10	-	-	25	**400**
4	(France) **Grégory Gaultier**	7	-	25	40	25	-	**100**	40	40	65	**335**
5	(Egypt) **Karim Darwish**	7	-	-	25	40	10	40	65	65	25	**270**
6	(Egypt) **Amr Shabana**	7	40	40	-	40	**100**	10	25	10	-	**265**
7	(England) **Peter Barker**	9	25	25	25	25	25	25	25	25	40	**240**
8	(Malaysia) **Mohd Azlan Iskandar**	9	10	25	10	15	25	15	40	15	15	**170**
9	(Australia) Stewart Boswell	8	15	10	15	10	10	40	25	25	-	**150**
10	(Egypt) **Mohamed El Shorbagy**	5	25	-	-	-	25	-	15	40	40	**145**
11	(Netherlands) **Laurens Jan Anjema**	6	25	-	25	-	25	-	10	25	25	**135**
12	(Australia) David Palmer	5	25	25	40	-	15	15	-	-	-	**120**
13	(England) Tom Richards	9	15	15	15	10	15	15	15	5	15	**120**
14	(Australia) Cameron Pilley	8	10	-	10	15	10	25	15	15	15	**115**
15	(Switzerland) Nicolas Müller	9	15	10	10	10	15	25	10	10	10	**115**
16	(England) Daryl Selby	7	15	10	-	15	15	-	15	15	25	**110**

Bold – The first eight players present for the final

Final tournament	Country	Location	Prize money	Date	2011 World Series Champion
PSA World Series Finals 2011	England	Queen's Club, London	$110,000	4–8 January 2012	(Egypt) **Amr Shabana**

== See also ==
- PSA World Tour 2011
- PSA World Series
- Official Men's Squash World Ranking
