= 2011 Men's World Open Squash Championship =

Men's World Open 2011
- 33rd PSA World Squash Championship
- Location: Rotterdam, Netherlands
- Venue: Luxor Theater
- Date: November 1–6, 2011
- Website worldopensquash2011.com

PSA World Tour
- Category: PSA World Open
- Prize money: $275,000

Results
- Champion: (England) Nick Matthew
- Runner-up: (France) Grégory Gaultier
- Semi-finalists: (Egypt) Karim Darwish (England) James Willstrop

The 2011 Men's World Open Squash Championship is the men's edition of the 2011 World Open, which serves as the individual world championship for squash players. The event took place at the squash club Victoria Squash Rotterdam and at the Luxor Theater in Rotterdam in the Netherlands from 1 to 6 November 2011. Nick Matthew successfully defended his title, defeating Grégory Gaultier in the final.

== Prize money and ranking points ==
For 2011, the prize purse was $275,000. The prize money and points breakdown is as follows:

Prize Money World Open (2011)
Event	W	F	SF	QF	3R	2R	1R
Points (PSA)	2890	1900	1155	700	410	205	125
Prize money	$40,000	$25,000	$15,000	$8,750	$5,000	$2,500	$1,250

== Seeds ==
1. (England) Nick Matthew (champion)
2. (Egypt) Ramy Ashour (quarterfinals)
3. (Egypt) Karim Darwish (semifinals)
4. (England) James Willstrop (semifinals)
5. (Egypt) Amr Shabana (quarterfinals)
6. (France) Grégory Gaultier (final)
7. (England) Peter Barker (quarterfinals)
8. (Australia) David Palmer (quarterfinals)
9. (Egypt) Mohamed El Shorbagy (third round)
10. (France) Thierry Lincou (third round)
11. (England) Daryl Selby (second round)
12. (Netherlands) Laurens Jan Anjema (third round)
13. (Malaysia) Mohd Azlan Iskandar (second round)
14. (Egypt) Omar Mosaad (second round)
15. (Egypt) Hisham Ashour (third round)
16. (Australia) Cameron Pilley (third round)

== Draw and results ==
=== Finals ===
Quarter finals
1	(England) Nick Matthew	6	11	11	11
7	(England) Peter Barker	11	8	8	5
8	(Australia) David Palmer	9	7	1
3	(Egypt) Karim Darwish	11	11	11
4	(England) James Willstrop	11	11	11	11
5	(Egypt) Amr Shabana	8	2	13	1
6	(France) Grégory Gaultier	11	11	3
2	(Egypt) Ramy Ashour	8	1	0

Semi finals
1	(England) Nick Matthew	11	11	11
3	(Egypt) Karim Darwish	9	9	1
4	(England) James Willstrop	6	8	4
6	(France) Grégory Gaultier	11	11	11

Final
1	(England) Nick Matthew *	6	11	11	11
6	(France) Grégory Gaultier	11	9	6	5

=== Top half ===
==== Section 1 ====
First round
1	(England) Nick Matthew	11	11	11
Q	(Italy) Stéphane Galifi	4	5	6
(England) Tom Richards	9	11	1	5
(Egypt) Tarek Momen	11	7	11	11
(Germany) Simon Rösner	12	11	11
Q	(South Africa) Clinton Leeuw	10	6	3
(England) Jonathan Kemp	10	8	11	6
9	(Egypt) Mohd El Shorbagy	12	11	7	11
16	(Australia) Cameron Pilley	11	11	11
Q	(Germany) Raphael Kandra	2	3	8
(Finland) Olli Tuominen	11	4	4	4
(England) Chris Ryder	8	11	11	11
(South Africa) Steve Coppinger	11	12	11
(England) Chris Simpson	1	10	8
(Australia) Aaron Frankcomb	4	1	4
7	(England) Peter Barker	11	11	11

Second round
1	(England) Nick Matthew	11	11	11
(Egypt) Tarek Momen	4	9	4
(Germany) Simon Rösner	10	7	10
9	(Egypt) Mohd El Shorbagy	12	11	12
16	(Australia) Cameron Pilley	11	11	11
(England) Chris Ryder	9	3	5
(South Africa) Steve Coppinger	7	10	4
7	(England) Peter Barker	11	12	11

Third round
1	(England) Nick Matthew	8	11	11	5	11
9	(Egypt) Mohd El Shorbagy	11	5	9	11	1
16	(Australia) Cameron Pilley	7	10	4
7	(England) Peter Barker	11	12	11

Quarter finals
1	(England) Nick Matthew	6	11	11	11
7	(England) Peter Barker	11	8	8	5

==== Section 2 ====
First round
8	(Australia) David Palmer	11	11	6	3	11
(Scotland) Alan Clyne	7	6	11	11	8
(Australia) Ryan Cuskelly	11	11	11
(England) Joey Barrington	5	7	5
(Malaysia) Nafiizwan Adnan	3	6	4
(Australia) Stewart Boswell	11	11	11
Q	(Canada) Shawn Delierre	11	11	3	11	13
10	(France) Thierry Lincou	13	4	11	4	15
14	(Egypt) Omar Mosaad	14	12	9	11
Q	(Egypt) Omar Abdel Meguid	12	10	11	9
(United States) Julian Illingworth	3	6	11	3
(Spain) Borja Golán	11	11	9	11
(Egypt) Wael El Hindi	6	11	11	11
(Mexico) Arturo Salazar	11	7	3	1
Q	(Finland) Henrik Mustonen	4	1	2
3	(Egypt) Karim Darwish	11	11	11

Second round
8	(Australia) David Palmer	11	11	11	11
(Australia) Ryan Cuskelly	6	13	5	5
(Australia) Stewart Boswell	5	11	7	7
10	(France) Thierry Lincou	11	8	11	11
14	(Egypt) Omar Mosaad	11	7	8	7
(Spain) Borja Golán	6	11	11	11
(Egypt) Wael El Hindi	9	3	4
3	(Egypt) Karim Darwish	11	11	11

Third round
8	(Australia) David Palmer	11	3	11	6	11
10	(France) Thierry Lincou	9	11	8	11	9
(Spain) Borja Golán	9	7	1
3	(Egypt) Karim Darwish	11	11	11

Quarter finals
8	(Australia) David Palmer	9	7	1
3	(Egypt) Karim Darwish	11	11	11

=== Bottom half ===
==== Section 1 ====
First round
4	(England) James Willstrop	11	11	11
(Hong Kong) Max Lee	8	6	7
Q	(England) Joe Lee	5	9	11	6
(Canada) Shahier Razik	11	11	6	11
Q	(Egypt) Mar El Shorbagy	11	11
(Pakistan) Farhan Mehboob	6	8	rtd
Q	(England) Adrian Waller	2	11	7
11	(England) Daryl Selby	11	13	11
15	(Egypt) Hisham Ashour	11	13	11
Q	(Australia) Zac Alexander	6	11	6
(New Zealand) Martin Knight	3	4	11	11	11
(Czech Republic) Jan Koukal	11	11	8	8	8
(Egypt) Karim Abdel Gawad	12	11	11
(Pakistan) Aamir Atlas Khan	10	9	5
Q	(Mexico) Eric Gálvez	5	6	6
5	(Egypt) Amr Shabana	11	11	11

Second round
4	(England) James Willstrop	11	4
(Canada) Shahier Razik	1	1
Q	(Egypt) Mar El Shorbagy	11	11	4	4	14
11	(England) Daryl Selby	8	7	11	11	12
15	(Egypt) Hisham Ashour	11	11	16
(New Zealand) Martin Knight	3	8	14
(Egypt) Karim Abdel Gawad	11	8	5	9
5	(Egypt) Amr Shabana	5	11	11	11

Third round
4	(England) James Willstrop	11	11	11	'
Q	(Egypt) Mar El Shorbagy	8	3	0
15	(Egypt) Hisham Ashour	11	11	4	9	5
5	(Egypt) Amr Shabana	3	8	11	11	11

Quarter finals
4	(England) James Willstrop	11	11	11	11
5	(Egypt) Amr Shabana	8	2	13	1

==== Section 2 ====
First round
6	(France) Grégory Gaultier	11	11	11
WC	(Netherlands) Dylan Bennett	4	3	6
(England) Adrian Grant	11	3	5	11	5
Q	(Mexico) Cesar Salazar	8	11	11	8	11
Q	(Italy) Davide Bianchetti	5	12	dis
(India) Saurav Ghosal	11	14
Q	(France) Grégoire Marche	4	12	7	1
12	(Netherlands) Laurens Jan Anjema	11	10	11	11
13	(Malaysia) Mohd Azlan Iskandar	11	11	3	11
(Malaysia) Ong Beng Hee	3	7	11	5
(Egypt) Omar Abdel Aziz	5	8	8
(Botswana) Alister Walker	11	11	11
(Egypt) Ali Anwar Reda	5	9	11	3
(Switzerland) Nicolas Müller	11	11	4	11
Q	(New Zealand) Campbell Grayson	9	12	5
2	(Egypt) Ramy Ashour	11	14	11

Second round
6	(France) Grégory Gaultier	11	11	11
Q	(Mexico) Cesar Salazar	3	9	5
(India) Saurav Ghosal	4	11	6	6
12	(Netherlands) Laurens Jan Anjema	11	9	11	11
13	(Malaysia) Mohd Azlan Iskandar	12	8	7	5
(Botswana) Alister Walker	10	11	11	11
(Switzerland) Nicolas Müller	11	11	3	8	5
2	(Egypt) Ramy Ashour	8	9	11	11	11

Third round
6	(France) Grégory Gaultier	8	5	11	11	11
12	(Netherlands) Laurens Jan Anjema	11	11	5	2	7
(Botswana) Alister Walker	11	11	6	9	3
2	(Egypt) Ramy Ashour	8	3	11	11	11

Quarter finals
6	(France) Grégory Gaultier	11	11	3
2	(Egypt) Ramy Ashour	8	1	0

== See also ==
- World Open
- 2011 Women's World Open Squash Championship
- 2011 Men's World Team Squash Championships

Preceded by Saudi Arabia (Al Khobar); 2010	PSA World Open; Netherlands (Rotterdam); 2011	Succeeded by Qatar (Doha); 2012
