= Men's Hurghada International 2011 =

Hurghada International 2011

Details
- Event name: Hurghada International 2011
- Location: Hurghada Egypt

Men's Winner
- Category: World Tour International 70
- Prize money: $77,500
- Year: World Tour 2011

The Men's Hurghada International 2011 is the men's edition of the 2011 Hurghada International squash tournament, which is a tournament of the PSA World Tour event International (prize money: $77,500). The event took place in Hurghada in Egypt from 14 May to 19 May. Ramy Ashour won his third Hurghada International trophy, beating Karim Darwish in the final.

== Prize money and ranking points ==
For 2011, the prize purse was $77,500. The prize money and points breakdown is as follows:

Prize money Hurghada International (2011)
Event	W	F	SF	QF	1R
Points (PSA)	1225	805	490	300	175
Prize money	$13,300	$9,100	$5,950	$3,675	$2,100

== Seeds ==
1. (Egypt) Ramy Ashour (champion)
2. (Egypt) Karim Darwish (final)
3. (France) Grégory Gaultier (semifinals)
4. (France) Thierry Lincou (first round)

== Draw and results ==
First round
1	(Egypt) Ramy Ashour	11	13	11
Q	(Egypt) Karim Abdel Gawad	4	11	8
(Egypt) Omar Mosaad	6	11	11	11
Q	(Germany) Simon Rösner	11	6	9	8
(Egypt) M. Ali Anwar Reda	11	11	11
WC	(Egypt) Mohd Abouelghar	9	8	4
(England) Tom Richards	12	8	5
3	(France) Grégory Gaultier	14	11	11
4	(France) Thierry Lincou	8	13	5
(Finland) Olli Tuominen	11	15	11
Q	(Egypt) Mohammed Abbas	11	13	11	11
(Pakistan) Aamir Atlas Khan	9	15	3	3
(Malaysia) Ong Beng Hee	13	11	7	4
(Egypt) Tarek Momen	11	13	11	11
Q	(Switzerland) Nicolas Müller	8	5	1
2	(Egypt) Karim Darwish	11	11	11

Quarter finals
1	(Egypt) Ramy Ashour	17	11	8	11
(Egypt) Omar Mosaad	15	4	11	6
(Egypt) M. Ali Anwar Reda	5	4	1
3	(France) Grégory Gaultier	11	11	11
(Finland) Olli Tuominen	11	11	8	11
Q	(Egypt) Mohammed Abbas	8	7	11	5
(Egypt) Tarek Momen	12	5	8
2	(Egypt) Karim Darwish	14	11	11

Semi finals
1	(Egypt) Ramy Ashour	11	12	11
3	(France) Grégory Gaultier	8	10	7
(Finland) Olli Tuominen	3	6	4
2	(Egypt) Karim Darwish	11	11	11

Final
1	(Egypt) Ramy Ashour	11	9	12	11	11
2	(Egypt) Karim Darwish	9	11	14	9	3

== See also ==
- PSA World Tour 2011
- Hurghada International
