= 2011 PSA World Series Finals =

PSA World Series Finals 2011
- 18th PSA World Series Finals

Details
- Event name: PSA World Series Finals 2011
- Location: London England
- Venue: Queen's Club
- Website www.worldseriesfinals.com

Men's Winner
- Category: PSA World Series Finals
- Prize money: $110,000
- Year: World Series 2011

The 2011 PSA World Series Finals is the men's edition of the 2011 PSA World Series Finals (prize money: $110 000). The top 8 players in the PSA World Series 2011 were qualified for the event. The event took place at the Queen's Club in London in England between 4–8 January 2012. Amr Shabana won his first PSA World Series Finals trophy, beating Grégory Gaultier in the final.

== Seeds ==
1. (England) James Willstrop (semifinals)
2. (France) Grégory Gaultier (final)
3. (Egypt) Karim Darwish (semifinals)
4. (Egypt) Amr Shabana (champion)
5. (England) Peter Barker (first round)
6. (Malaysia) Mohd Azlan Iskandar (first round)
7. (Egypt) Mohamed El Shorbagy (first round)
8. (Netherlands) Laurens Jan Anjema (first round)

== Group stage results ==
=== Group 1 ===
| (England) James Willstrop | 11 | 11 | - | 6 | 5 | (Egypt) Karim Darwish |
| (Egypt) Mohamed El Shorbagy | 11 | 11 | - | 7 | 5 | (Malaysia) Mohd Azlan Iskandar |

| (England) James Willstrop | 11 | 11 | | - | 7 | 6 | | (Egypt) Mohamed El Shorbagy |
| (Egypt) Karim Darwish | 11 | 8 | 11 | - | 4 | 11 | 5 | (Malaysia) Mohd Azlan Iskandar |

| (England) James Willstrop | 6 | 11 | 9 | - | 11 | 6 | 11 | (Malaysia) Mohd Azlan Iskandar |
| (Egypt) Karim Darwish | 11 | 11 | | - | 9 | 9 | | (Egypt) Mohamed El Shorbagy |

| Rank | Player | Match | Wins | Losses | Points |
|---|---|---|---|---|---|
| 1 | (England) James Willstrop | 3 | 2 | 1 | 4 |
| 2 | (Egypt) Karim Darwish | 3 | 2 | 1 | 4 |
| 3 | (Egypt) Mohamed El Shorbagy | 3 | 1 | 2 | 2 |
| 4 | (Malaysia) Mohd Azlan Iskandar | 3 | 1 | 2 | 2 |

=== Group 2 ===
| (France) Grégory Gaultier | 11 | 13 | | - | 5 | 11 | | (Netherlands) Laurens Jan Anjema |
| (Egypt) Amr Shabana | 7 | 11 | 11 | - | 11 | 8 | 7 | (England) Peter Barker |

| (France) Grégory Gaultier | 14 | 11 | - | 12 | 6 | (England) Peter Barker |
| (Egypt) Amr Shabana | 11 | 11 | - | 5 | 4 | (Netherlands) Laurens Jan Anjema |

| (France) Grégory Gaultier | 11 | 11 | | - | 7 | 4 | | (Egypt) Amr Shabana |
| (England) Peter Barker | 11 | 9 | 11 | - | 8 | 11 | 9 | (Netherlands) Laurens Jan Anjema |

| Rank | Player | Match | Wins | Losses | Points |
|---|---|---|---|---|---|
| 1 | (France) Grégory Gaultier | 3 | 3 | 0 | 6 |
| 2 | (Egypt) Amr Shabana | 3 | 2 | 1 | 4 |
| 3 | (England) Peter Barker | 3 | 1 | 2 | 2 |
| 4 | (Netherlands) Laurens Jan Anjema | 3 | 0 | 3 | 0 |

== Draw and results ==
Semi finals
1st PSA1 | (England) James Willstrop | 11 | 5
2nd PSA2 | (Egypt) Amr Shabana | 13 | 11
2nd PSA1 | (Egypt) Karim Darwish | 5 | 5
1st PSA2 | (France) Grégory Gaultier | 11 | 11

Final
(Egypt) Amr Shabana * | 6 | 12 | 11 | 7 | 11
(France) Grégory Gaultier | 11 | 10 | 7 | 11 | 8

== See also ==
- 2011 WSA World Series Finals
- PSA World Tour 2011
- PSA World Series 2011
- PSA World Series Finals
