= Nick Matthew =

British squash player

Nick Matthew OBE
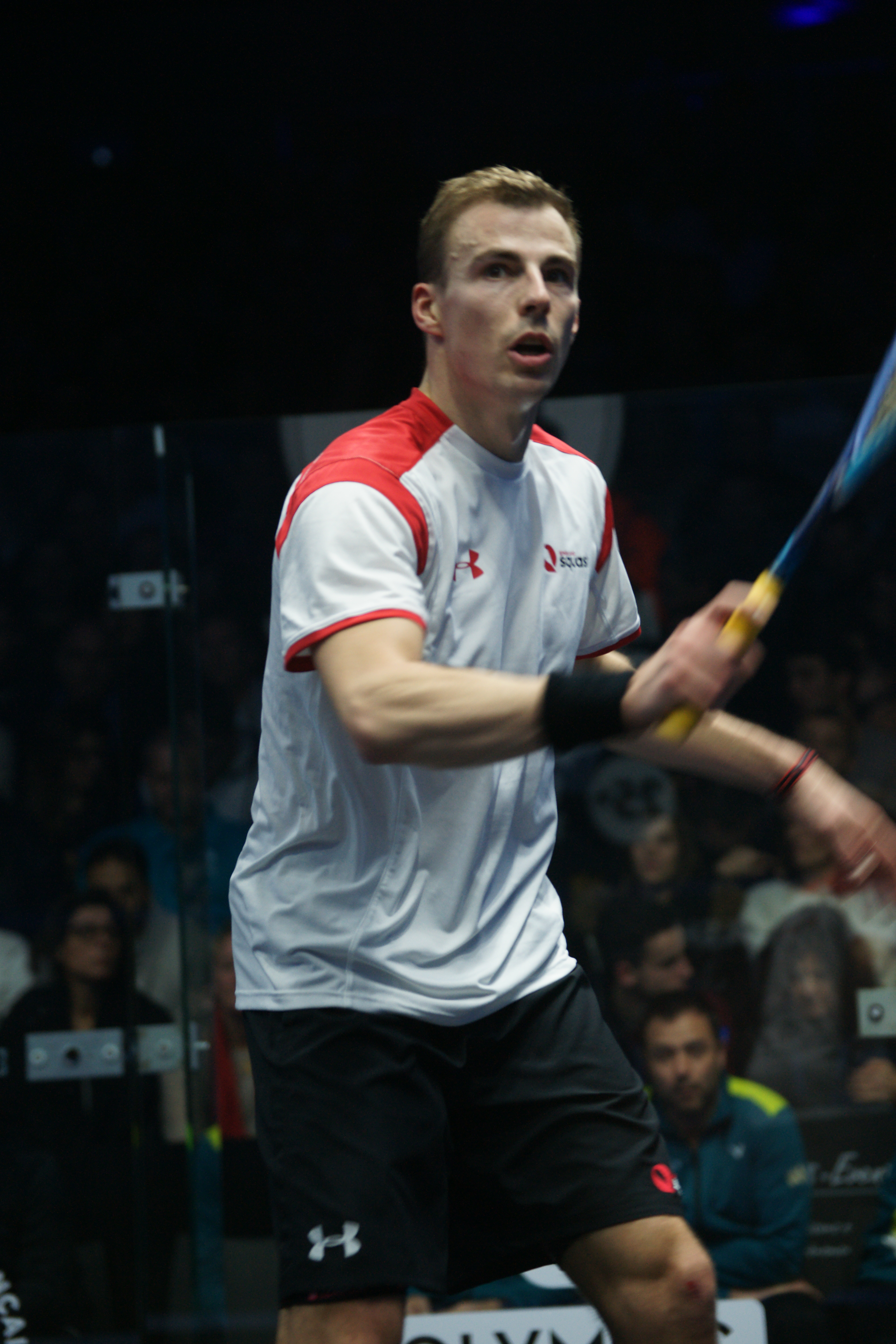
- Nick Matthew at the 2017 Men's World Team Squash Championships

Personal information
- Full name: Nicholas Matthew
- Nickname: "The Wolf"
- Nationality: British (English)
- Born: 25 July 1980 (age 46) Sheffield, South Yorkshire, England
- Height: 6 ft 0 in (1.83 m)
- Weight: 77 kg (170 lb)
- Website: www.nickmatthew.co.uk

Sport
- Handedness: Right Handed
- Turned pro: 1998
- Coached by: David Pearson
- Retired: 2018
- Racquet used: Dunlop Force Evolution 120

Men's singles
- Highest ranking: No. 1 (June 2010)
- Title: 33
- Tour final: 71
- World Open: W (2010, 2011, 2013)
Medal record
Men's squash
Representing Great Britain
World Games
Gold medal – first place	2009 Kaohsiung	Singles
Bronze medal – third place	2005 Duisburg	Singles
Representing England
World Championships
Gold medal – first place	2010 Khobar	Singles
Gold medal – first place	2011 Rotterdam	Singles
Gold medal – first place	2013 Manchester	Singles
Bronze medal – third place	2007 Bermuda	Singles
Bronze medal – third place	2012 Doha	Singles
Bronze medal – third place	2014 Doha	Singles
World Team Championships
Gold medal – first place	2005 Islamabad	Team
Gold medal – first place	2007 Chennai	Team
Gold medal – first place	2013 Mulhouse	Team
Silver medal – second place	2011 Paderborn	Team
Silver medal – second place	2017 Marseille	Team
Bronze medal – third place	2003 Vienna	Team
Commonwealth Games
Gold medal – first place	2010 Delhi	Singles
Gold medal – first place	2010 Delhi	Doubles
Gold medal – first place	2014 Glasgow	Singles
Silver medal – second place	2014 Glasgow	Doubles

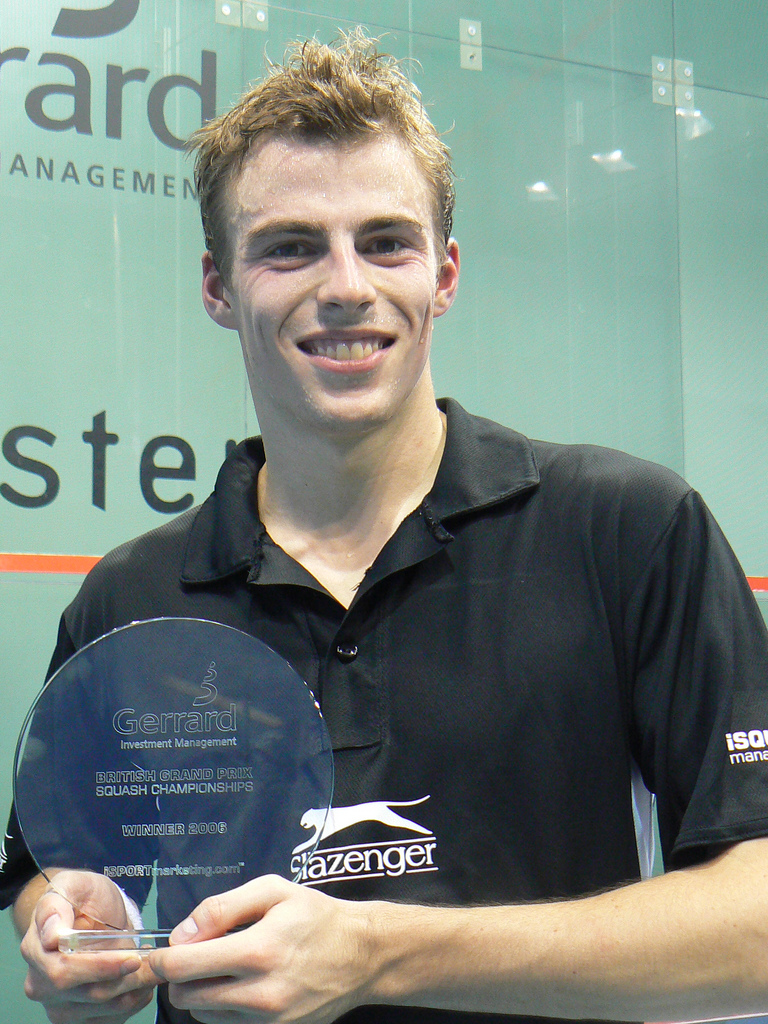
Nick Matthew holding his 2006 British Grand Prix Squash Championships trophy

Nicholas Matthew OBE (born 25 July 1980 in Sheffield) is a former English professional squash player who has won the two most prestigious tournaments in the professional game, the British Open and the World Open, three times each. He reached a career-high world ranking of World No. 1 in June 2010. His home club is Hallamshire Tennis and Squash Club in Sheffield which has named 'The Nick Matthew Showcourt' after him.

He married Esme Taylor, a sports physiologist who has worked with British Cycling, in 2013 and the couple celebrated the birth of their first child Charlotte Rose on 9 September 2014.

== Career overview ==
Nick Matthew, who attended High Storrs School, first came to the squash world's attention as an outstanding junior player. He was the 1999 British Junior Open under-19 champion, a semi-finalist at the 1998 World Junior Championships, and a member of the England team which won the 1998 world junior team title. He made his first appearance on the professional tour in 1998.

He represented the 2006 England team at the 2006 Commonwealth Games in Melbourne, Australia, where he finished fourth in the singles competition. Also in 2006, Matthew became the first English player to win the British Open men's title since 1939. In the final, against Thierry Lincou of France, he came back from 0–4 down in the fifth game to win 11–8, 5–11, 11–4, 9–11, 11–6. In 2007, Matthew won the US Open title, beating James Willstrop in the final 11–7, 11–4, 11–7.

Matthew won the British National Championship title in 2006 and 2009. In 2006, Matthew played Lee Beachill in a tight final, which he won 11–9, 6–11, 11–9, 10–12, 12–10. In 2009, he defeated Adrian Grant in the final 11–4, 11–3, 11–9. Matthew was a member of the England team which won the World Team Squash Championships in 2005 and 2007.

2009 saw Matthew soar up in rankings to world No. 4 in December. His best achievement of the year is by winning the Qatar Classic Open title in November. In the Saudi International Open, Matthew's fine run was halted by Ramy Ashour who beat him in the final that decided the next world No. 1. Matthew lost in 110 minutes in a gruelling 5-game match.

In June 2010, Matthew topped the world rankings for the first time.

In the men's singles final of the 2010 Commonwealth Games in Delhi, Matthew defeated compatriot James Willstrop 11–6, 11–7, 11–7 in 66 minutes to win the gold medal.

December 2010 Matthew won the World Open Squash Men's Title, becoming the first Englishman in the premier event's 35-year history to win the PSA World Championship

Matthew won the PSA 2010 World Open, defeating James Willstrop of England in the final by 3 games to 1 in 74 minutes at The Sunset Beach Resort in Saudi Arabia on Friday 10 December 2010.

Matthew won the PSA 2011 World Open, defeating Grégory Gaultier of France in the final by 3 games to 1 in 92 minutes at the Luxor Theatre in Rotterdam, The Netherlands on Sunday 6 November 2011. After struggling with an injury in late 2011, Matthew entered the J.P. Morgan Tournament of Champions, beating then world number 1 James Willstrop. He has since regained his position as world number 1.

He won his 3rd British Open title on 20 May 2012, becoming the first Englishman to win the title three times in the professional era.

Matthew won his third PSA 2013 World Open in the Central arena Manchester, England on Sunday 3 November 2013. The 33-year-old world number one from Sheffield joined a select group of players – Australian Geoff Hunt; Pakistanis Jahangir Khan and Jansher Khan; and Egyptian Amr Shabana.

In February 2014, Matthew won a record sixth British National title with victory over fellow Englishman James Willstrop in the final before getting the better of Willstrop once more in the final of the Canary Wharf Classic to win his fourth title at the London event.

2014 saw more 2014 Commonwealth Games success for Matthew despite a knee injury, sustained in training, which overshadowed his preparations. Matthew carried the baton through his native Sheffield before the Games and was then chosen by his teammates to be flag bearer for Team England at the opening ceremony at Celtic Park in Glasgow.

In competition, Matthew competed in singles and doubles with Adrian Grant. He won Gold in singles courtesy of a 11–9 8–11 11–5 6–11 11–5 over James Willstrop in what was described as an 'absorbing contest', shown live on BBC Television. He and Grant then took silver in the doubles after falling 10–11 11–7 11–9 to Australians Cameron Pilley and David Palmer.

2015 has proved to be another successful year for Matthew. He became the first man since Ramy Ashour in 2013 to win three PSA World Tour titles in a row when he followed victories in the Swedish Open and Windy City Open with a record-breaking fifth Canary Wharf Classic trophy.

Matthew has had continued success in 2016, despite bad luck with injuries and illness at key times of the season. He won a record eighth title at the British National championships in Manchester in February, beating his long-time rival James Willstrop 11-2 6-11 11-3 11-3 and dropping only one game all week.

On the PSA World Tour, he was runner-up to World No.1 Mohamad El Shorbagy in three prestigious finals. At January's J.P Morgan Tournament of Champions, played in the iconic Grand Central station, Elshorbagy defeated Matthew 8-11 11-6 11-8 6-11 11-6 in the final.

In March, Matthew met El Shorbagy again in the final of the Windy City Open before injury prevented him from completing the match.

In October's Delaware Investments US Open once again saw a potentially epic encounter brought to an early end as Matthew was forced to retire in the fifth game.

== Off-Court ==
Matthew launched the Nick Matthew Academy in February 2016, based in Sheffield and run in association with the One Health Group. The Academy has the goal of coaching and nurturing the next generation of English squash players and has created a pathway to help children go from beginners to elite players.

As well as his association with the One Health Group (which works with the NHS to treat patients referred by their GP for orthopaedics, spine, general surgery and gynaecology), Matthew also works with a range of commercial partners: AJ Bell (a financial and investment services provider); equipment suppliers Dunlop, Hi-Tec, 2-Undr and Trion-Z; Rowe Motor Oil; FairBriar International; Benz Bavarian (which supplies his Mercedes car); Netsuite; Sea Island Resort and Squash and Beyond squash camps. He is also supported national governing body England Squash.

Matthew has been a patron of the Sheffield Children's Hospital since 2014.

In November 2016 he was named as an Athlete Ambassador for the 2018 Gold Coast Commonwealth Games by Commonwealth Games England.

== World Open final appearances ==
=== 3 titles and 0 runner-up ===
Outcome	Year	Location	Opponent in the final	Score in the final
Winner	2010	Saudi Arabia	(England) James Willstrop	7–11, 11–6, 11–2, 11–3
Winner	2011	Rotterdam, Netherlands	(France) Grégory Gaultier	6–11, 11–9, 11–6, 11–5
Winner	2013	Manchester, England	(France) Grégory Gaultier	11–9, 11–9, 11–13, 7–11, 11–2

== Major World Series final appearances ==
=== Australian Open: 2 finals (1 title, 1 runner-up) ===
Outcome	Year	Opponent in the final	Score in the final
Winner	2010	(Egypt) Ramy Ashour	14-16, 11-7, 12-10, 11-4
Runner-up	2011	(Egypt) Ramy Ashour	12-14, 11-6, 10-12, 11-8, 11-4

=== British Grand Prix: 1 final (0 titles, 1 runner-up) ===
Outcome	Year	Opponent in the final	Score in the final
Runner-up	2011	(Egypt) Ramy Ashour	1-11, 11-3, 11-7, 11-4

=== British Open: 5 finals (3 titles, 2 runner-up) ===
Outcome	Year	Opponent in the final	Score in the final
Winner	2006	(France) Thierry Lincou	11–8, 5–11, 11–4, 9–11, 11–6
Winner	2009	(England) James Willstrop	8–11, 11–8, 7–11, 11–3, 12–10
Winner	2012	(Egypt) Ramy Ashour	11–9, 11–4, 11–8
Runner-up	2014	(France) Grégory Gaultier	11–3, 11–6, 11–2
Runner-up	2017	(France) Grégory Gaultier	8-11, 11-7, 11-3, 11-3

=== Hong Kong Open: 2 finals (1 title, 1 runner-up) ===
Outcome	Year	Opponent in the final	Score in the final
Runner-up	2004	(France) Thierry Lincou	11–8, 11–4, 13–11
Winner	2013	(Spain) Borja Golán	11–1, 11–8, 5–11, 11–5

=== North American Open: 4 finals (2 titles, 2 runner-up) ===
Outcome	Year	Opponent in the final	Score in the final
Runner-up	2009	(Egypt) Ramy Ashour	11-8, 13-11, 10-12, 5-11, 11-8
Winner	2010	(Egypt) Ramy Ashour	11-9, 16-14, 5-4 rtd
Winner	2011	(Egypt) Ramy Ashour	11-9, 11-5, 8-11, 11-6
Runner-up	2013	(Egypt) Ramy Ashour	11-7, 11-8, 5-11, 11-7

=== PSA Masters: 2 finals (1 title, 1 runner-up) ===
Outcome	Year	Opponent in the final	Score in the final
Runner-up	2009	(Egypt) Ramy Ashour	11–6, 9–11, 11–9, 11–9
Winner	2010	(England) James Willstrop	11–8, 11–7, 11–8

=== Qatar Classic: 2 finals (1 title, 1 runner-up) ===
Outcome	Year	Opponent in the final	Score in the final
Winner	2009	(Egypt) Karim Darwish	11–5, 12–10, 11–6
Runner-up	2013	(Egypt) Mohamed El Shorbagy	11–5, 5–11, 11–6, 6–11, 11–4

=== Saudi International: 1 final (0 titles, 1 runner-up) ===
Outcome	Year	Opponent in the final	Score in the final
Runner-up	2009	(Egypt) Ramy Ashour	11-7, 7-11, 11-9, 9-11, 11-8

=== Sky Open: 1 final (1 title, 0 runner-up) ===
Outcome	Year	Opponent in the final	Score in the final
Winner	2010	(Egypt) Karim Darwish	6-11, 11-7, 12-10, 13-11

=== Tournament of Champions: 6 finals (1 title, 5 runner-up) ===
Outcome	Year	Opponent in the final	Score in the final
Runner-up	2006	(Egypt) Amr Shabana	11-6, 11-9, 11-4
Runner-up	2009	(France) Grégory Gaultier	11-9, 2-11, 11-8, 11-4
Runner-up	2011	(Egypt) Ramy Ashour	11-3, 11-7, 9-11, 11-7
Winner	2012	(England) James Willstrop	8-11, 11-9, 11-5, 11-7
Runner-up	2015	(Egypt) Mohamed El Shorbagy	5-11, 11-9, 11-8, 12-10
Runner-up	2016	(Egypt) Mohamed El Shorbagy	8-11, 11-6, 11-8, 6-11, 11-6

=== US Open: 4 finals (1 title, 3 runner-up) ===
Outcome	Year	Opponent in the final	Score in the final
Winner	2007	(England) James Willstrop	11–7, 11–4, 11–7
Runner-up	2011	(Egypt) Amr Shabana	11–9, 8–11, 11–2, 11–4
Runner-up	2013	(France) Grégory Gaultier	11–4, 11–5, 11–5
Runner-up	2016	(Egypt) Mohamed El Shorbagy	10-12, 12-14, 11-1, 11-4, 3-0 rtd

=== Windy City Open: 2 finals (1 title, 1 runner-up) ===
Outcome	Year	Opponent in the final	Score in the final
Winner	2015	(Egypt) Mohamed El Shorbagy	11–7, 11–2, 11–7
Runner-up	2016	(Egypt) Mohamed El Shorbagy	11–6, 11–3, 2–0 rtd

== Career statistics ==
=== Singles performance timeline ===
Terms
W–L	Win–loss	NWS	Not a World Series event
NG50	Not an international event	NH	Not held
A	Absent	LQ/#Q	Lost in qualifying draw and round number
RR	Lost at round robin stage	#R	Lost in the early rounds
QF	Quarterfinalist	SF	Semifinalist
SF-B	Semifinalist, won bronze medal	F	Runner-up
F	Runner-up, won silver medal	W	Winner

To prevent confusion and double counting, information in this table is updated only once a tournament or the player's participation in the tournament has concluded.

Tournament	2001	2002	2003	2004	2005	2006	2007	2008	2009	2010	2011	2012	2013	2014	2015	2016	Career SR	Career W-L
PSA World Series Tournaments
World Open	NH	2R	QF	1R	2R	2R	SF	QF	QF	W	W	SF	W	SF	QF		3 / 14	44–11
British Open	Absent			QF	A	W	QF	A	W	Not Held		W	SF	F	SF		3 / 8	29–5
Hong Kong Open	2R	A	NH	F	NH	2R	QF	2R	A	QF	QF	SF	W	A	SF		1 / 10	24–9
Qatar Classic	1R	1R	SF	NH	2R	SF	QF	SF	W	SF	2R	NH	F	NH	A		1 / 11	25–10
PSA Masters	Absent		1R	1R	QF	QF	Not Held		F	W	A	Not Held					1 / 6	13–5
Tournament of Champions	Absent		1R	QF	QF	F	Absent		F	SF	F	W	SF	QF	F	F	1 / 12	37–11
North American Open	Not Held			Not World Series		Absent			F	W	W	SF	F	Not Held			2 / 5	21–3
Kuwait PSA Cup	Not Held			Absent		NH	QF	A	NH	2R	QF	NH	3R	Not Held			0 / 4	6–4
US Open	NH	A	QF	QF	SF	QF	W	NH	Absent		F	SF	F	SF	SF		1 / 10	31–9
Saudi International	Not Held				SF	QF	QF	SF	F	Not Held							0 / 5	14–5
Pakistan International	NH	A	NH	SF	QF	A	NH	NWS	Not Held					Not World Series			0 / 2	5–2
Windy City Open				NWS				Not Held			Not World Series			SF	W	F	1 / 3	12–2
El Gouna International	Not Held									A	NH	SF	NH	A	SF		0 / 2	6–2
Australian Open									NWS	W	F	NWS	Not Held		NWS		1 / 2	9–1
British Grand Prix	Not Held							Not Held		1R	F	NWS	NH	Not World Series			0 / 2	4–2
Sky Open	Not Held							A	2R	W	Not Held		NWS	Not Held			1 / 2	6–1
Win Ratio	0 / 2	0 / 2	0 / 5	0 / 7	0 / 7	1 / 8	1 / 7	0 / 4	2 / 8	5 / 10	2 / 9	2 / 7	2 / 8	0 / 5	1 / 7	0 / 2	16 / 98	NA
Win–loss	1–2	1–2	8–5	13–7	14–7	20–7	18–6	10–4	30–6	35–5	32–7	26–5	30–6	16–5	24–6	8-2	NA	286–82

Note: NA = Not Available

== See also ==
- Official Men's Squash World Ranking

Sporting positions
Preceded by Ramy Ashour; Ramy Ashour; James Willstrop; Ramy Ashour	World No. 1 June 2010 – August 2010; January 2011 – December 2011; February 2012; January 2014 – March 2014	Succeeded by Ramy Ashour; James Willstrop; James Willstrop; Grégory Gaultier
Awards and achievements
Preceded by Karim Darwish; Ramy Ashour	PSA Player of the Year; 2008; 2013	Succeeded by Ramy Ashour; Ramy Ashour
