= Aaron Frankcomb =

Australian squash player (born 1985)

Personal information
- Born: 4 April 1985 (age 41) Hobart, Tasmania, Australia
- Height: 1.76 m (5 ft 9 in)
- Weight: 72 kg (159 lb)
- Website: www.eastcoastsquashacademy.com.au; www.aaronfrankcomb.com.au

Sport
- Country: Australia
- Turned pro: 2002
- Coached by: David Pearson, Geoff Hunt & Rodney Martin
- Retired: Active
- Racquet used: Dunlop

Men's singles
- Highest ranking: No. 38 (November 2009)
- Current ranking: Retired (Retired)
- Title: 4
- Tour final: 8
Medal record
Men's squash
Representing Australia
World Team Championships
Bronze medal – third place	2009 Odense	Team
Bronze medal – third place	2011 Paderborn	Team
- Updated on November 2012

Aaron Frankcomb (born 4 April 1985) is an Australian professional squash player.
