= Robbie Temple =

English squash player (born 1986)

Personal information
- Full name: Robbie Temple
- Born: 20 August 1986 (age 39) Gloucester, England
- Height: 5 ft 10 in (1.78 m)

Sport
- Country: England
- Handedness: Left Handed
- Turned pro: 2005
- Coached by: Peter Genever
- Retired: Active
- Racquet used: Wilson

Men's singles
- Highest ranking: No. 52 (December 2012)
- Current ranking: No. 62 (march 2013)
- Updated on 9 February 2010

Robbie Temple (born 20 August 1986) is a professional squash player who represents England. He reached a career-high world ranking of World No. 52 in December 2012 .

Temple is the holder of the 1st and 4th British Squash Professional Association (BSPA) Elite Events. He is the semi-finalist of the 2008 Australian Open; losing to David Palmer of Australia.

Robbie is currently playing his squash in and around London.
