= Stéphane Galifi =

Italian squash player (born 1978)

Personal information
- Born: 14 January 1978 (age 48) Nogent-sur-Marne, France
- Height: 1.84 m (6 ft 0 in)
- Weight: 75 kg (165 lb)

Sport
- Country: Italy
- Handedness: Right Handed
- Turned pro: 1997
- Coached by: Richard Davis
- Racquet used: Tecnifibre

Men's singles
- Highest ranking: No. 40 (July 2005)
- Title: 8
- Tour final: 13
- Updated on April 2013

Stéphane Galifi (born 14 January 1978 in Nogent-sur-Marne) is a professional squash player who represents Italy. He reached a career-high world ranking of World No. 40 in July 2005.
