= Jan Koukal (squash player) =

Czech squash player (born 1983)

Personal information
- Born: 20 June 1983 (age 43) Prague, Czech Republic
- Height: 1.80 m (5 ft 11 in)
- Weight: 72 kg (159 lb)

Sport
- Country: Czech Republic
- Turned pro: 2004
- Coached by: Michael Fitteni; Antonin Felfel
- Retired: Active
- Racquet used: Tecnifibre, Supreme 130

Men's singles
- Highest ranking: No. 39 (January 2005)
- Current ranking: No. 71 (February 2014)
- Title: 21
- Tour final: 37
- Updated on February 2014

Jan Koukal (born 20 June 1983 in Prague) is a professional squash player who represented Czech Republic.

Koukal joined the Professional Squash Association (PSA) in 2000 and turned pro in 2004. He reached a career-high world ranking of World No. 39 in January 2005.
