= Laurens Jan Anjema =

Dutch squash player (born 1982)

Personal information
- Full name: Laurens Jan Anjema
- Nickname: L.J.
- Born: 1 December 1982 (age 43) The Hague, Netherlands
- Years active: 17
- Height: 1.89 m (6 ft 2 in)
- Weight: 86.6 kg (191 lb)
- Website: www.laurensanjema.com

Sport
- Country: Netherlands
- Handedness: Left Handed
- Turned pro: 1999
- Retired: 2016
- Racquet used: Harrow

Men's singles
- Highest ranking: No. 9 (December, 2010)
- Title: 12
- Tour final: 32

Laurens Jan Anjema (born 1 December 1982 in The Hague) is a former professional squash player from the Netherlands. He reached a career-high world ranking of World No. 9, after breaking the top 20 in January 2008.

== Career overview ==
Laurens Jan Anjema won the Bluenose Classic in 2008 in a huge match against Borja Golán in 5 games in the final 8–11, 12–10, 11–5, 4–11, 13–11.

In 2011, Anjema reached the final of the US Open and won the Netsuite Open in San Francisco against Omar Mosaad in the final. At the end of the year, he qualified for the 2011 PSA World Series Finals, the top 8 players of the PSA World Series in 2011.

In December 2010, Anjema became the first Dutch player to reach the top 10 of the PSA World Rankings. He is a 10-time Dutch national champion, only second to his father Robert Jan Anjema, who won 12 national titles. He retired in June 2016 after a disappointing season coming back from injury.

In July 2018, Anjema won the World Masters Squash Championships Men's Over-35 title in Charlottesville, Virginia, defeating fellow former professional Alister Walker 3-1 (11-7, 11-5, 7-11, 11-2).

== Major World Series final appearances ==
=== US Open: 1 final (1 title, 0 runner-up) ===
Outcome	Year	Opponent in the final	Score in the final
Runner-up	2010	(Egypt) Wael El Hindi	11-8, 5-11, 11-7, 11-7
