= Alan Clyne =

Scottish squash player (born 1986)

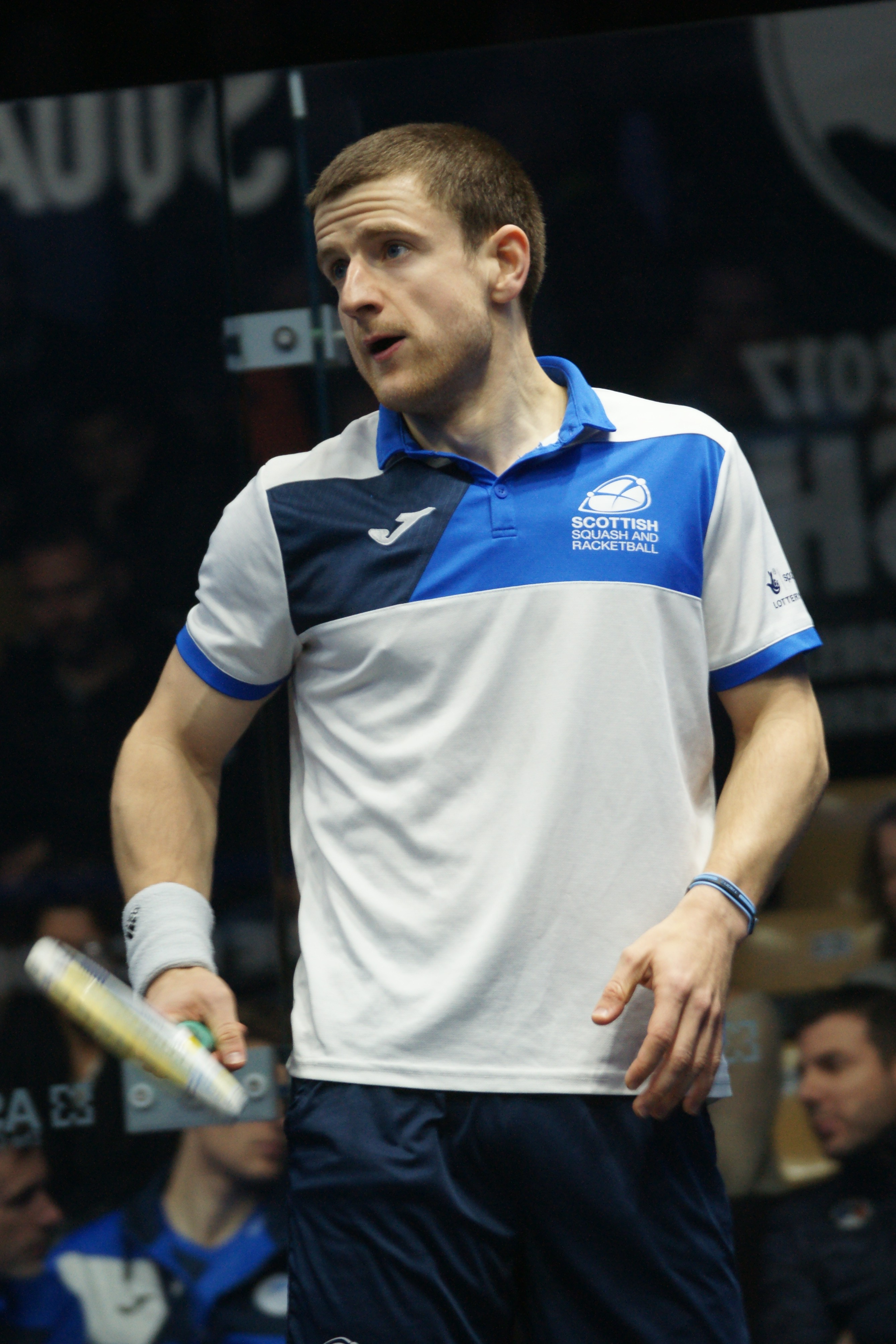
- Alan Clyne at the 2017 Men's World Team Squash Championships

Personal information
- Nationality: British (Scottish)
- Born: 25 July 1986 (age 40) Inverness, Scotland
- Height: 1.73 m (5 ft 8 in)

Sport
- Turned pro: 2007
- Coached by: Paul Bell, Martin Heath
- Retired: 2022
- Racquet used: Harrow Vapor

Men's singles
- Highest ranking: No. 24 (November 2017)
- Current ranking: No. 38 (April 2021)
- Title: 4
- Tour final: 10
Medal record
Men's squash
Representing Scotland
World Doubles Championships
Gold medal – first place	2016 Darwin	Doubles
Silver medal – second place	2017 Manchester	Doubles
Bronze medal – third place	2022 Glasgow	Doubles
National Championships
Gold medal – first place	2008, 2010, 2014–2020	singles

Alan Clyne (born 25 July 1986) is a Scottish former professional squash player. He reached a world ranking of 24 in November 2017. He attended four Commonwealth Games, was a ten-time national champion and world doubles champion.

== Biography ==
Clyne represented the Scottish team at the 2010 Commonwealth Games in Delhi, India, where he competed in the squash events reaching the semi-finals of the men's doubles with Harry Leitch.

Clyne attended his second Commonwealth Games after being selected by the Scottish team at the 2014 Commonwealth Games in Glasgow, where he competed in the singles and doubles events reaching the semi-finals of the men's doubles with Harry Leitch again. Four years later a third appearance ensued, representing the 2018 Scottish team at the 2018 Commonwealth Games in the Gold Coast, Australia, where he competed in the singles and doubles events reaching the semi-finals of the men's doubles with Greg Lobban.

In between his second and third Games, he won the 2016 World Squash Doubles Championships with Greg Lobban. He went to his fourth Commonwealth Games in 2022 in Birmingham.

Clyne was a ten-time national singles champion at the Scottish National Squash Championships in 2008, 2010, and from 2014 to 2020.

He was the Scottish number one, following in the footsteps of greats such as Peter Nicol and John White.
