= Jonathan Kemp =

English squash player (born 1981)

Personal information
- Born: 18 March 1981 (age 45) Wolverhampton, England
- Height: 1.83 m (6 ft 0 in)
- Weight: 77 kg (170 lb)

Sport
- Country: England
- Handedness: Left Handed
- Turned pro: 1999
- Retired: 2014
- Racquet used: Harrow

Men's singles
- Highest ranking: No. 20 (July, 2010)
- Title: 12
- Tour final: 15
Medal record
Men's squash
Representing England
European Team Championships
Gold medal – first place	2011 Espoo	Team

Jonathan Kemp (born 18 March 1981]) is a former professional squash player who represented England. He reached a career-high world ranking of World No. 20 in July 2010.

== Biography ==
Kemp won a gold medal for the England men's national squash team at the 2011 European Squash Team Championships in Espoo.
