= Alister Walker =

Botswana squash player (born 1982)

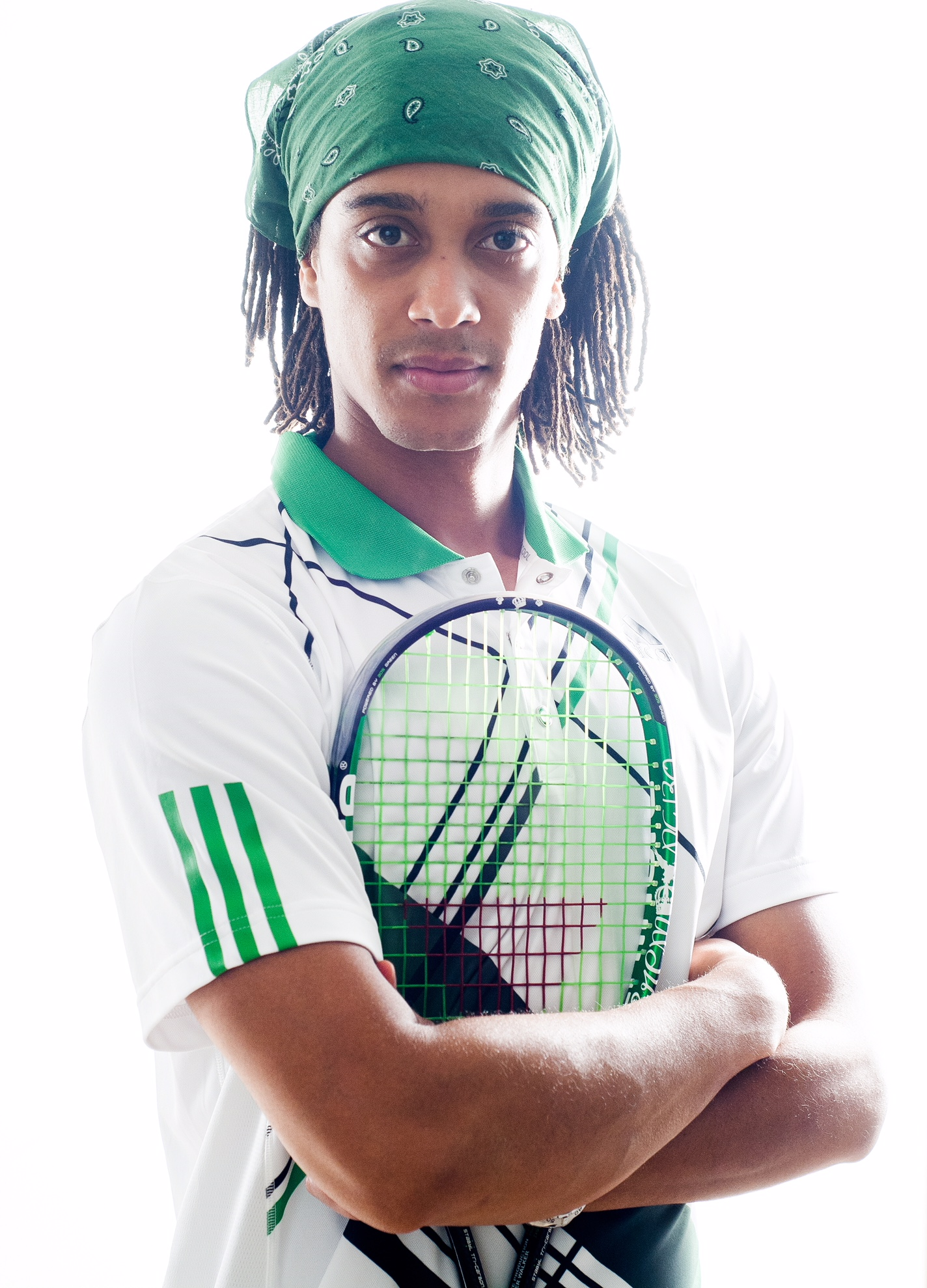

Personal information
- Born: September 19, 1982 (age 43) Gaborone, Botswana
- Height: 1.75 m (5 ft 9 in)
- Weight: 75 kg (165 lb)

Sport
- Country: Botswana; England
- Handedness: Right Handed
- Turned pro: 2002
- Coached by: David Pearson
- Racquet used: Tecnifibre

Men's singles
- Highest ranking: No. 12 (September 2009)
- Title: 10
- Tour final: 16
Medal record
Men's squash
Representing England
European Team Championships
Gold medal – first place	2009 Malmö	Team

Alister Walker (born 19 September 1982) is a former professional squash player who represented England and then Botswana. He reached a career-high world ranking of World No. 12 in September 2009.

== Biography ==
Walker won a gold medal for the England men's national squash team at the 2009 European Squash Team Championships in Malmö.
