= Mohamed Reda =

Egyptian squash player (born 1989)

Personal information
- Full name: Mohamed Ali Anwar Reda
- Born: April 16, 1989 (age 37) Cairo, Egypt
- Height: 1.77 m (5 ft 10 in)
- Weight: 70 kg (154 lb)

Sport
- Country: Egypt
- Handedness: Right Handed
- Turned pro: 2005
- Coached by: Ahmed El Matany
- Retired: July 2019
- Racquet used: Head

Men's singles
- Highest ranking: No. 23 (October, 2011)
- Current ranking: No. 40 (September, 2013)
- Title: 11
- Tour final: 14
- Updated on September, 2013

Mohamed Ali Anwar Reda (Arabic: محمد علي أنور رضا; born April 16, 1989, in Cairo), known as Mohamed Reda, is a former professional squash player who represented Egypt. He reached a career-high world ranking of World No. 23 in October 2011.

In July 2019, when he was World No. 57, Reda announced his retirement from the PSA Tour.
