= Stewart Boswell =

Australian squash player

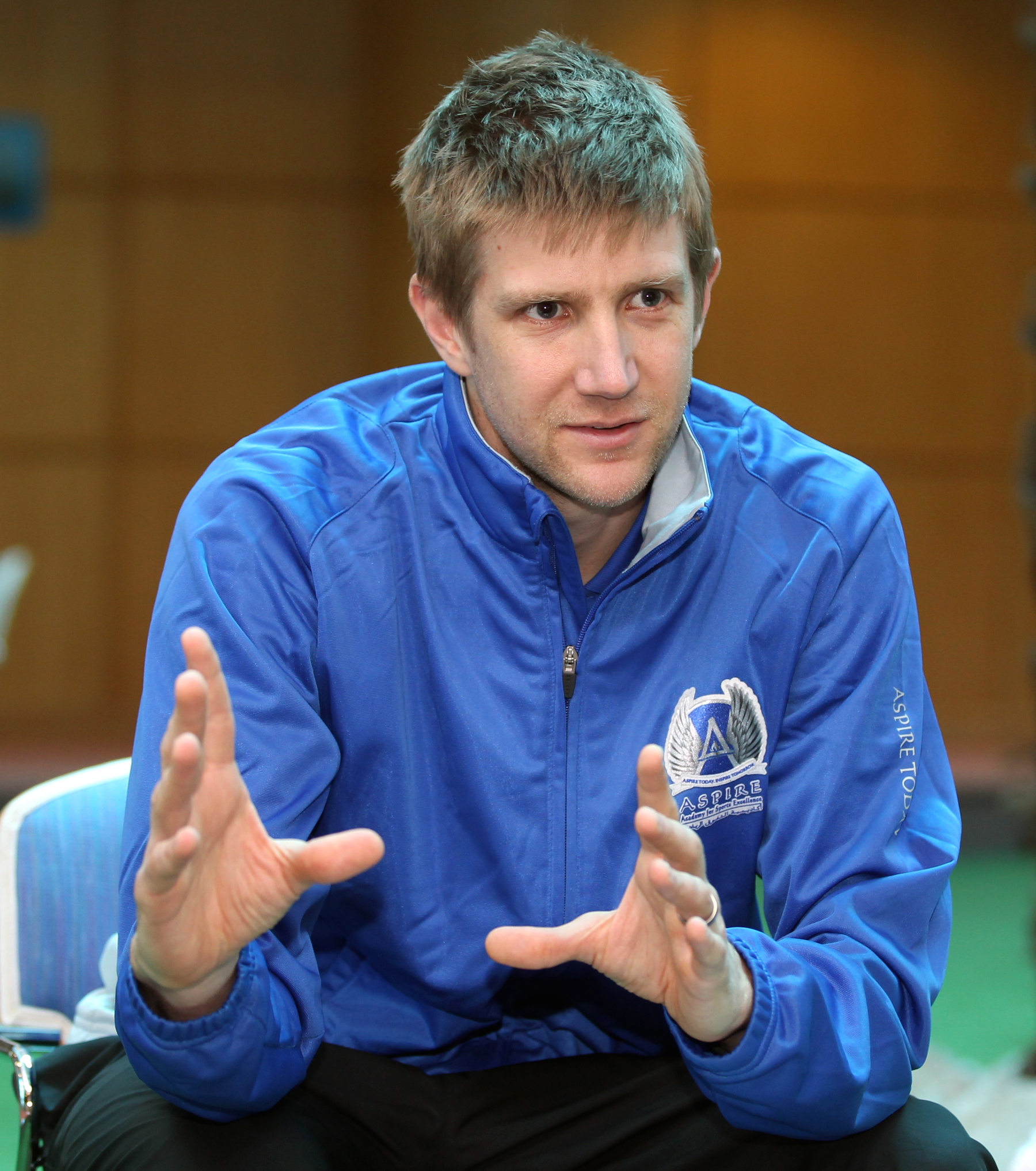

Personal information
- Nicknames: Bozza, The Surgeon
- Born: 29 July 1978 (age 48) Canberra, Australia
- Height: 6 ft 2 in (1.88 m)
- Weight: 78 kg (172 lb)

Sport
- Country: Australia
- Turned pro: 1996
- Coached by: Rodney Martin
- Retired: 2011
- Racquet used: Dunlop

Men's singles
- Highest ranking: No. 4 (May, 2002)
- Title: 8
- Tour final: 18
Medal record
Men's squash
Representing Australia
World Team Championships
Gold medal – first place	2001 Melbourne	Team
Silver medal – second place	2007 Chennai	Team
Bronze medal – third place	2009 Odense	Team
Bronze medal – third place	2011 Paderborn	Team
World Doubles Championships
Gold medal – first place	2006 Melbourne	Doubles
Commonwealth Games
Silver medal – second place	2002 Manchester	Doubles
Silver medal – second place	2006 Melbourne	Doubles
Silver medal – second place	2010 New Delhi	Doubles
Bronze medal – third place	2002 Manchester	Singles

Stewart Boswell (born 29 July 1978 in Canberra, Australian Capital Territory) is an Australian former professional squash player.

== Career Overview ==
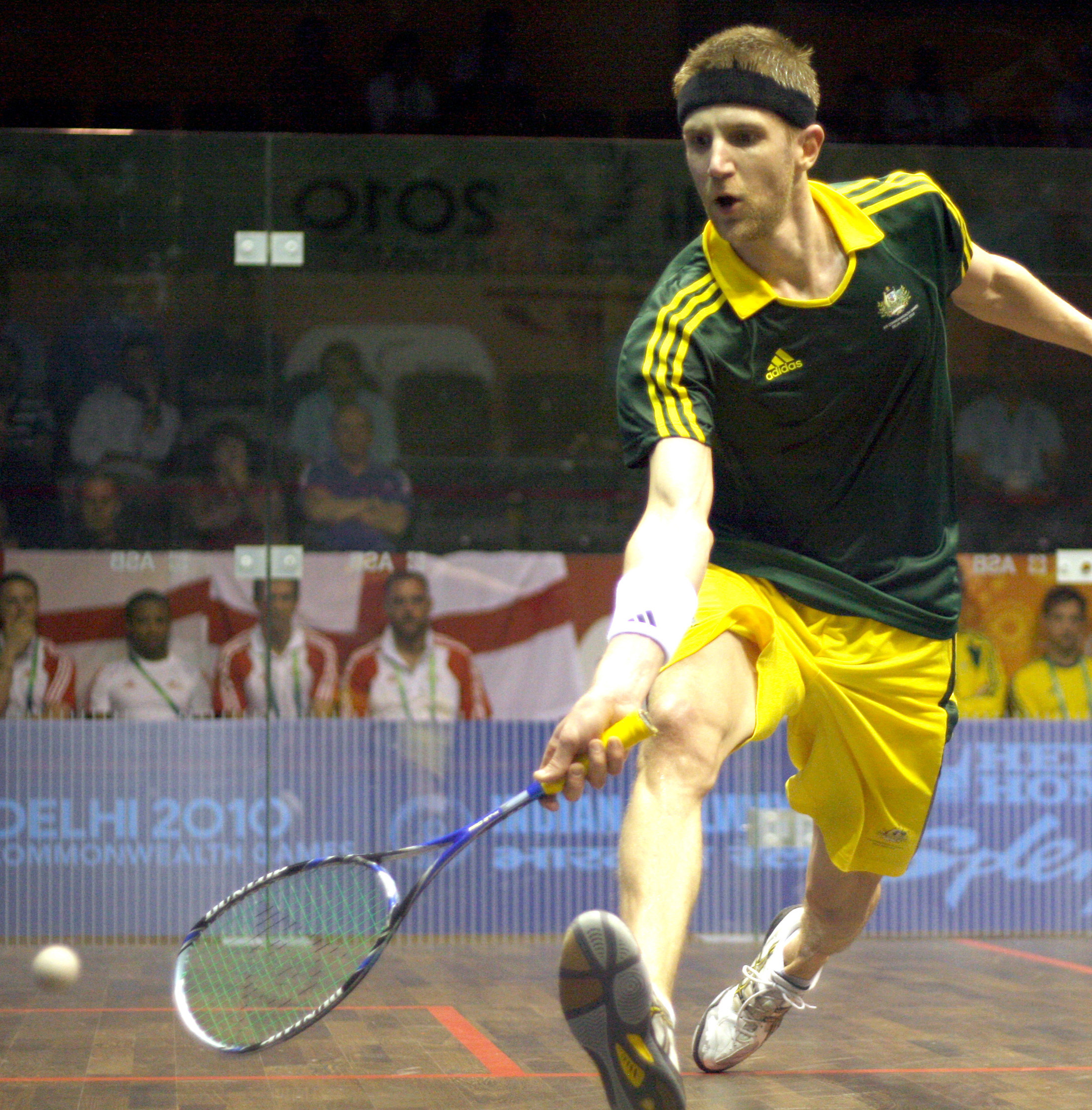
XIX Commonwealth Games-2010 Delhi Squash (Men's) Stewart Boswell of Australia in an action against Peter Barker of England, at Sirifort Sports Complex, in New Delhi on 6 October 2010

In 2003, Boswell had been ranked in the world's top-10 for two years and had reached a career-high ranking of World No. 4, when a mystery back ailment forced him to stop playing. He returned to the professional tour in 2005. On his return, he won six of the tour's lower-ranking tournaments in a row, and two further lower-ranking tournaments later in the year. He broke back into the world's top-20 in 2006 and the top-10 in 2007.

At the 2002 Commonwealth Games, Boswell won a bronze medal in the men's singles, and silver medal in the men's doubles partnering Anthony Ricketts. Boswell and Ricketts again won a men's doubles silver medal at the 2006 Commonwealth Games. The pair won the men's doubles title at the 2006 World Doubles Squash Championships.

During the 2011 Kuwait PSA Cup, where he lost in the quarter-finals to Grégory Gaultier, Boswell announced that he would be retiring as a professional player.

== Major World Series final appearances ==
=== US Open: 1 finals (0 title, 1 runner-up) ===
Outcome	Year	Opponent in the final	Score in the final
Runner-up	2002	(Australia) David Palmer	15–13, 15–10, 15–11
