= Tom Richards (squash player) =

English squash player (born 1986)

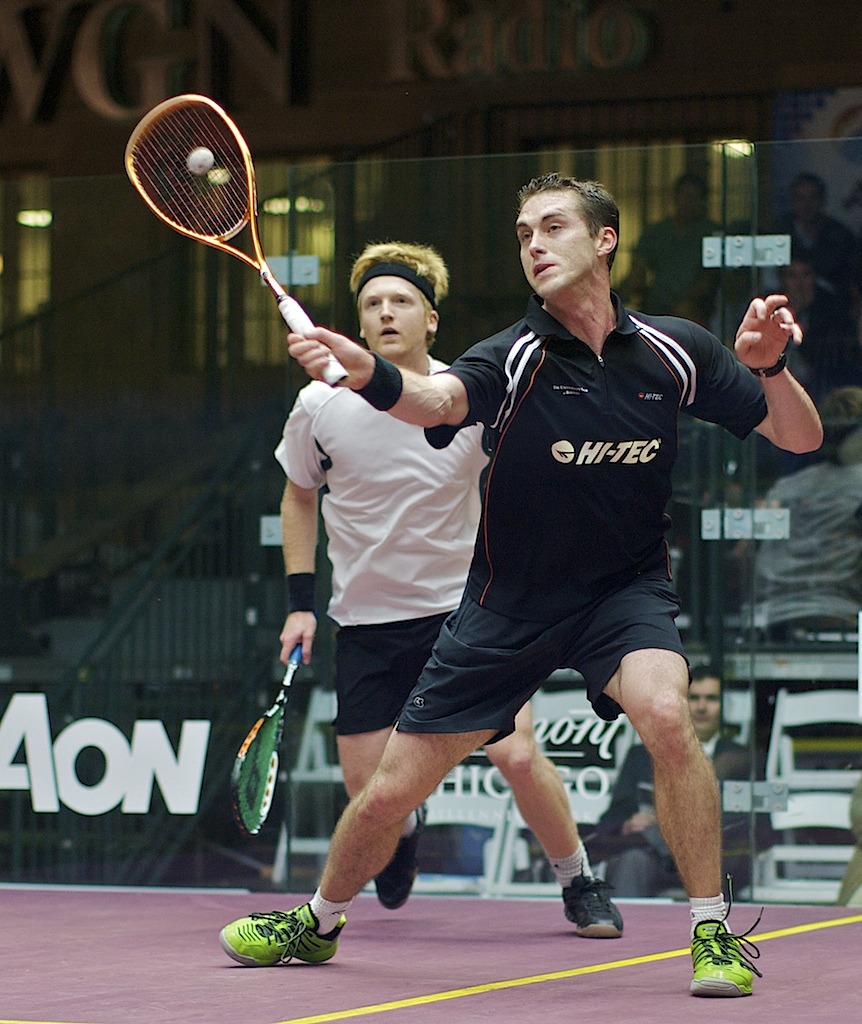
- Tom(left) & David Palmer in action.

Personal information
- Born: 10 July 1986 (age 40) Guildford, England
- Height: 1.83 m (6 ft 0 in)
- Weight: 77 kg (170 lb)

Sport
- Country: England
- Handedness: Right handed
- Turned pro: 2005
- Coached by: Robbie Temple, Stephen Meads
- Retired: 2022
- Racquet used: Karakal

Men's singles
- Highest ranking: No. 12 (September 2012)
- Title: 6
- Tour final: 15
Medal record
Men's squash
Representing England
European Team Championships
Gold medal – first place	2012 Nuremberg	Team
Gold medal – first place	2016 Warsaw	Team
Silver medal – second place	2017 Helsinki	Team
Silver medal – second place	2018 Wrocław	Team
Gold medal – first place	2019 Birmingham	Team

Tom Richards (born 10 July 1986) is a retired Professional Squash player on the PSA World Tour who represented England. He reached a career-high World ranking of No. 12, winning a total of 6 PSA Titles.

== Biography ==
Richards was part of the England Squash set-up since the age of 9, having started playing at the age of 3. He was the Under 12 and Under 13 British National Champion and an Under 15, 17 and 19 European Champion with the England Team. He decided to turn professional at the age of 18 in November 2004 and in 2005 he won his first PSA title becoming the Kenya Open Champion.

At the age of 25, Richards was a member of the England Elite squad and a full England International and won three gold medals for the England men's national squash team at the European Squash Team Championships at the 2012 European Squash Team Championships, 2016 European Squash Team Championships and 2019 European Squash Team Championships.

Richards suffered a series of serious injuries throughout his career, including an ACL tear within the early years of his Professional career and a major Hamstring Tear in the 2012/13 season. After ACL reconstruction surgery Richards climbed to his highest ranking of 12 in the World in the 2012/13 season before suffering a 100% hamstring tear at the Grasshopper Cup in Zurich, slipping on sweat. Choosing rehabilitation instead of surgery, the following 18 months were a gruelling mixture of injury, rehabilitation and set back. After 17 years of competing globally Richards retired, aged 35.
