= Peter Barker (squash player) =

English squash player (born 1983)

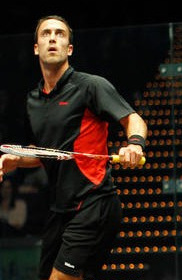
- Barker during the 2011 Australian Open quarter-final.

Personal information
- Nationality: British (English)
- Born: 26 September 1983 (age 42) London, England
- Height: 5 ft 11 in (1.80 m)
- Weight: 82 kg (181 lb)

Sport
- Handedness: Left Handed
- Turned pro: 2002
- Coached by: Lee Davies
- Retired: 2015
- Racquet used: Wilson

Men's singles
- Highest ranking: No. 5 (December, 2012)
- Title: 16
- Tour final: 26
- World Open: SF (2010)
Medal record
Men's squash
Representing England
World Championships
Bronze medal – third place	2010 Khobar	Singles
World Team Championships
Gold medal – first place	2007 Chennai	Team
Silver medal – second place	2011 Paderborn	Team
Commonwealth Games
Silver medal – second place	2014 Glasgow	Mixed doubles
Bronze medal – third place	2010 Delhi	Men's singles
Bronze medal – third place	2014 Glasgow	Men's singles
European Team Championships
Gold medal – first place	2006 Vienna	Team
Gold medal – first place	2007 Riccione	Team
Gold medal – first place	2008 Amsterdam	Team
Gold medal – first place	2009 Malmö	Team
Bronze medal – third place	2010 Aix-en-Provence	Team
Gold medal – first place	2011 Espoo	Team
Gold medal – first place	2012 Nuremberg	Team
Gold medal – first place	2013 Amsterdam	Team
Gold medal – first place	2014 Riccione	Team
Silver medal – second place	2015 Herning	Team

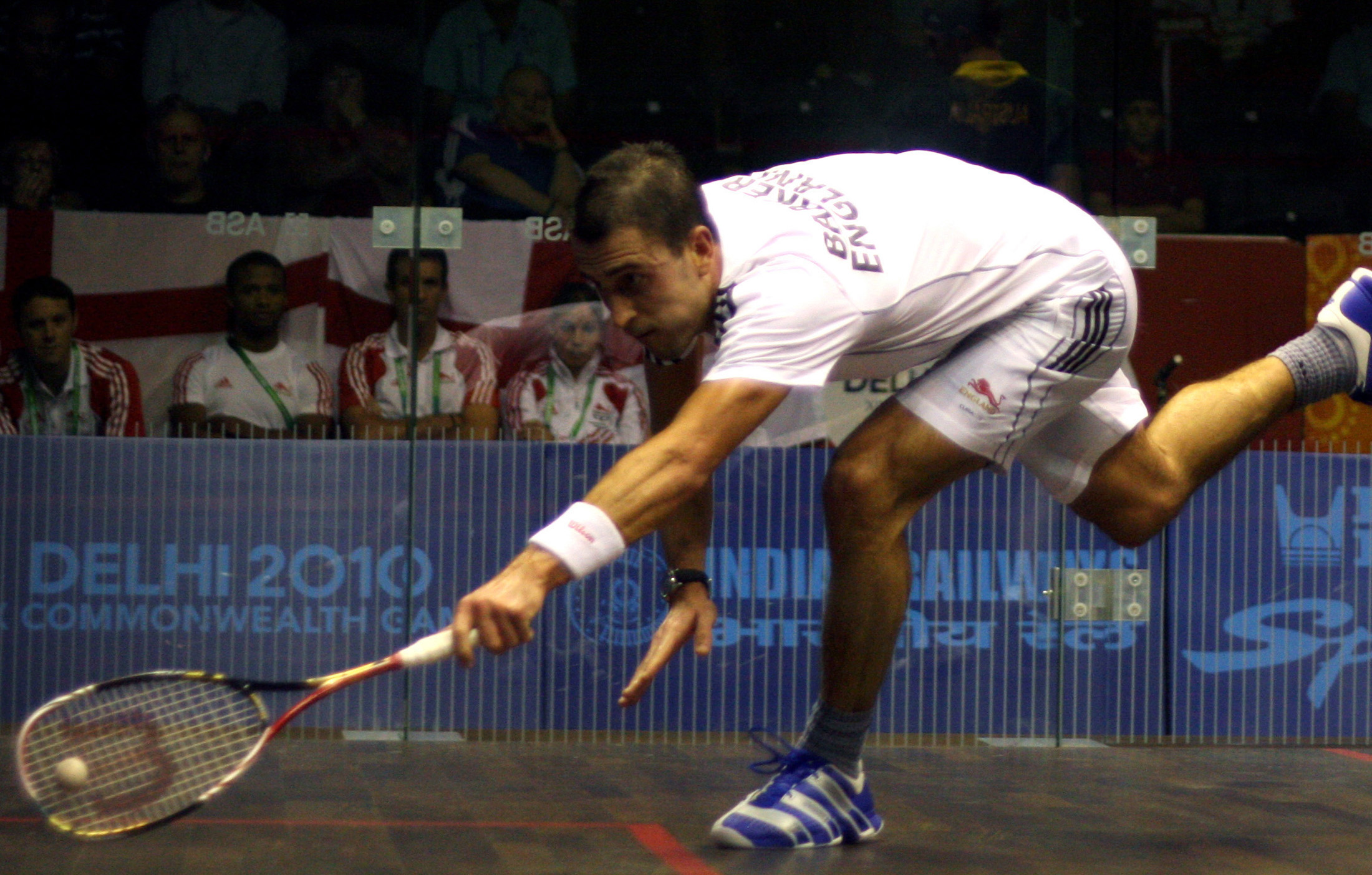
XIX Commonwealth Games-2010 Delhi Squash (Men’s) Peter Barker of England in an action against Stewart Boswell of Australia, at Sirifort Sports Complex, in New Delhi on 6 October 2010

Peter Barker (born 26 September 1983) is a professional squash player from Upminster, England. He reached a career high ranking of 5 in the world, December 2012.

== Biography ==
Barker was born in London and was educated at Brentwood School from 1995 to 2002.

In September 2008, Barker defeated David Palmer twice, with a decisive 3–0 victory over David Palmer in Chicago at the Sweet Home Chicago Open, and a 3–2 victory in Baltimore at the Merrit Properties Open. Barker's highest world ranking of 5 was reached in December 2012. Shortly afterwards he was selected to represent the senior England team at the World Team Championships in December 2008, held in India. and has 12 professional tour titles to his name out of 15 final appearances.

In 2010, Barker represented the 2010 England team and won the bronze medal in the 2010 Commonwealth Games squash men's singles event in Delhi after defeating Mohd Azlan Iskandar from Malaysia in straight sets, 11-5, 11–4, 11–2. The match ended in 45 minutes. Barker had a match point against Ramy Ashour in the quarterfinals of the 2012 U.S. Open, but ended up losing the match. Ashour would go on to win the US Open, beating Gregory Gaultier in the finals.

Barker went to another Commonwealth Games after representing the 2014 England team at the 2014 Commonwealth Games in Glasgow, Scotland, where he competed in the squash events and won two medals.

Barker won eight gold medals for the England men's national squash team at the European Squash Team Championships in 2006, 2007, 2008, 2009, 2011, 2012, 2013 and 2014.

Barker is currently a broker.
