= 2015–16 PSA World Series =

Details
- Event name: 2015–16 PSA World Series
- Website; PSA World Series standings
- Year: PSA World Tour 15–16

The PSA World Series 2015–16 is a series of men's and women's squash tournaments which are part of the Professional Squash Association (PSA) World Tour for the end of the 2015 and the start of the 2016 squash season. The PSA World Series tournaments are some of the most prestigious events on the men's and women's tour. The best-performing players in the World Series events qualify for the annual 2016 Men's PSA World Series Finals and 2016 Women's PSA World Series Finals tournament. Grégory Gaultier won the men's 2016 PSA World Series against Cameron Pilley and Laura Massaro won the women's 2016 PSA World Series against Raneem El Weleily.

== PSA World Series Ranking Points ==
PSA World Series events also have a separate World Series ranking. Points for this are calculated on a cumulative basis after each World Series event. The top eight players at the end of the calendar year are then eligible to play in the PSA World Series Finals.

Tournament			Ranking Points
Rank	Prize Money US$	Ranking Points	Winner	Runner up	3/4	5/8	9/16	17/32
World Series	$150,000-$350,000	625 points	100	65	40	25	15	10

== 2015–16 Men's PSA World Series ==
=== 2015–16 Men's Tournaments ===
Tournament	Country	Location	Rank	Prize money	Date	2015–16 Winner
US Open 2015	United States	Philadelphia	World Series	$150,000	10–17 October 2015	(France) Grégory Gaultier
Qatar Classic 2015	Qatar	Doha	World Series	$150,000	31 October - 6 November 2015	(Egypt) Mohamed El Shorbagy
Hong Kong Open 2015	Hong Kong	Hong Kong	World Series	$150,000	1–6 December 2015	(Egypt) Mohamed El Shorbagy
Tournament of Champions 2016	United States	New York City	World Series	$150,000	7–14 January 2016	(Egypt) Mohamed El Shorbagy
Windy City Open 2016	United States	Chicago, Illinois	World Series	$150,000	25 February - 2 March 2016	(Egypt) Mohamed El Shorbagy
British Open 2016	England	Hull	World Series	$150,000	21–27 March 2016	(Egypt) Mohamed El Shorbagy
El Gouna International 2016	Egypt	El Gouna	World Series	$150,000	24–29 April 2016	(Egypt) Mohamed El Shorbagy

=== Men's World Series Standings 2015–16 ===
Performance Table Legend
10	1st Round	15	2nd Round
25	Quarterfinalist	40	Semifinalist
65	Runner-up	**100**	Winner

**Top 16 Men's World Series Standings 2015–16**
Rank	Player	Number of Tournament	US Open	Qatar Classic	Hong Kong Open	Tournament of Champions	Windy City Open	British Open	El Gouna International	Total Points
Rank	Player	Number of Tournament	USA (United States)	QAT (Qatar)	HKG (Hong Kong)	USA (United States)	USA (United States)	ENG (England)	EGY (Egypt)	Total Points
1	(Egypt) **Mohamed El Shorbagy**	7	40	**100**	**100**	**100**	**100**	**100**	**100**	**640**
2	(France) **Grégory Gaultier**	6	**100**	65	25	40	-	40	65	**335**
3	(England) **Nick Matthew**	5	40	-	40	65	65	15	-	**225**
4	(Egypt) **Omar Mosaad**	7	65	15	40	25	40	10	25	**220**
5	(Colombia) **Miguel Ángel Rodríguez**	7	10	25	25	10	40	25	40	**175**
6	(Germany) **Simon Rösner**	7	25	15	15	25	25	25	25	**155**
7	(France) **Mathieu Castagnet**	7	25	10	25	40	25	10	15	**150**
8	(Australia) **Cameron Pilley**	7	10	10	65	15	10	10	10	**130**
9	(Egypt) Fares Dessouky	6	25	15	-	15	10	15	40	**120**
10	(Egypt) Marwan El Shorbagy	6	-	10	10	25	25	25	25	**120**
11	(Australia) Ryan Cuskelly	7	10	40	10	15	10	15	10	**110**
12	(Egypt) Tarek Momen	7	15	10	25	10	25	10	15	**110**
13	(Egypt) Karim Abdel Gawad	5	-	25	-	15	15	40	15	**110**
14	(England) Daryl Selby	7	25	15	15	10	15	10	10	**100**
15	(Hong Kong) Max Lee	7	10	25	10	15	15	10	10	**95**
16	(Egypt) Ali Farag	5	10	25	-	-	10	25	25	**95**

Bold – Players qualified for the final

Final tournament	Country	Location	Prize money	Date	2016 World Series Champion
PSA World Series Finals 2016	United Arab Emirates	Dubai	$160,000	24-28 May 2016	(France) Grégory Gaultier

== 2015–16 Women's PSA World Series ==
=== 2015–16 Women's Tournaments ===
Tournament	Country	Location	Rank	Prize money	Date	2015–16 Winner
US Open 2015	United States	Philadelphia	World Series	$150,000	10–17 October 2015	(England) Laura Massaro
Qatar Classic 2015	Qatar	Doha	World Series	$115,000	31 October - 6 November 2015	(England) Laura Massaro
Hong Kong Open 2015	Hong Kong	Hong Kong	World Series	$95,000	1–6 December 2015	(Malaysia) Nicol David
Tournament of Champions 2016	United States	New York City	World Series	$150,000	7–14 January 2016	(Egypt) Nour El Sherbini
Metro Squash Windy City Open 2016	United States	Chicago, Illinois	World Series	$150,000	25 February - 2 March 2016	(Egypt) Raneem El Weleily
British Open 2016	England	Hull	World Series	$130,000	21–27 March 2016	(Egypt) Nour El Sherbini

=== Women's World Series Standings 2015–16 ===
Performance Table Legend
10	1st Round	15	2nd Round
25	Quarterfinalist	40	Semifinalist
65	Runner-up	**100**	Winner

**Top 16 Women's World Series Standings 2015–16**
Rank	Player	Number of Tournament	US Open	Qatar Classic	Hong Kong Open	Tournament of Champions	Windy City Open	British Open	Total Points
Rank	Player	Number of Tournament	USA (United States)	QAT (Qatar)	HKG (Hong Kong)	USA (United States)	USA (United States)	ENG (England)	Total Points
1	(England) **Laura Massaro**	6	**100**	**100**	65	25	40	25	**355**
2	(Egypt) **Nour El Sherbini**	5	25	65	-	**100**	65	**100**	**355**
3	(Malaysia) **Nicol David**	6	25	40	**100**	40	25	40	**270**
4	(Egypt) **Raneem El Weleily**	6	25	10	40	15	**100**	25	**215**
5	(Egypt) **Nouran Gohar**	5	15	25	25	40	25	65	**195**
6	(Egypt) **Omneya Abdel Kawy**	6	40	40	40	25	25	25	**195**
7	(France) **Camille Serme**	5	40	25	25	25	40	40	**195**
8	(United States) **Amanda Sobhy**	5	15	15	25	65	25	25	**170**
9	(Hong Kong) Annie Au	6	10	25	10	15	15	15	**90**
10	(England) Jenny Duncalf	6	15	15	15	10	15	10	**80**
11	(India) Joshna Chinappa	5	15	25	15	15	-	10	**80**
12	(England) Emily Whitlock	6	10	10	15	15	15	10	**75**
13	(Hong Kong) Joey Chan	6	10	10	10	10	15	15	**70**
14	(Egypt) Heba El Torky	6	10	10	15	15	10	10	**70**
15	(Malaysia) Delia Arnold	5	15	-	15	15	15	10	**70**
16	(England) Sarah-Jane Perry	5	10	15	-	10	15	15	**65**

Bold – Players qualified for the final

Final tournament	Country	Location	Prize money	Date	2016 World Series Champion
PSA World Series Finals 2016	United Arab Emirates	Dubai	$160,000	24-28 May 2016	(England) Laura Massaro

== See also ==
- PSA World Tour 2015
- PSA World Tour 2016
- Official Men's Squash World Ranking
- Official Women's Squash World Ranking
