= Men's Qatar Classic 2015 =

Qatar Classic 2015
- 14th Men's Qatar Classic

Details
- Event name: Qatar Classic Squash Championship 2015
- Location: Doha, Qatar
- Venue: Aspire Academy
- Website www.squashsite.co.uk/qatar/

Men's Winner
- Category: World Series
- Prize money: $150,000
- Year: World Tour 2015

The Men's Qatar Classic 2015 is the men's edition of the 2015 Qatar Classic squash tournament, which is a PSA World Series event ($150,000 prize money). The event took place in Doha from 31 October to 6 November. Mohamed El Shorbagy won his second Qatar Classic trophy, beating Grégory Gaultier in the final.

== Prize money and ranking points ==
For 2015, the prize purse is $150,000. The prize money and points breakdown is as follows:

Prize Money Qatar Classic (2015)
| Event | W | F | SF | QF | 2R | 1R |
| Points (PSA) | 2625 | 1725 | 1050 | 640 | 375 | 190 |
| Prize money | $23,625 | $15,525 | $9,450 | $5,740 | $3,375 | $1,690 |

== Seeds ==
1. (Egypt) Mohamed El Shorbagy (champion)
2. (France) Grégory Gaultier (final)
3. (Colombia) Miguel Ángel Rodríguez (quarterfinals)
4. (Egypt) Omar Mosaad (second round)
5. (Germany) Simon Rösner (second round)
6. (England) Peter Barker (first round)
7. (France) Mathieu Castagnet (first round)
8. (Egypt) Tarek Momen (first round)

== Draw and results ==
First round
1 | (Egypt) Mohd El Shorbagy * | 11 | 11 | 11
WC | (Qatar) Abdulla Al-Tamimi | 9 | 4 | 9
Q | (Egypt) Mohd Abouelghar | 5 | 9 | 11 | 11 | 11
(England) James Willstrop | 11 | 11 | 9 | 3 | 9
(Hong Kong) Max Lee | 4 | 11 | 11 | 11
Q | (Scotland) Greg Lobban | 11 | 7 | 3 | 4
(South Africa) Stephen Coppinger | 7 | 14 | 11 | 9 | 9
5 | (Germany) Simon Rösner * | 11 | 12 | 6 | 11 | 11
7 | (France) Mathieu Castagnet | 11 | 9 | 4 | 2
Q | (Australia) Ryan Cuskelly * | 3 | 11 | 11 | 11
(Egypt) Marwan Elshorbagy | 11 | 11 | 3 | 12
(England) Chris Simpson | 13 | 6 | 11 | 14
(England) Adrian Waller | 11 | 12 | 6 | 11
(Switzerland) Nicolas Müller | 9 | 10 | 11 | 7
(Australia) Cameron Pilley | 7 | 8 | 14 | 5
3 | (Colombia) Miguel Á. Rodríguez * | 11 | 11 | 12 | 11
4 | (Egypt) Omar Mosaad * | 11 | 11 | 11
Q | (Hong Kong) Leo Au | 9 | 3 | 9
Q | (Malaysia) Mohd Nafi. Adnan | 7 | 6 | 9
(Egypt) Mazen Hesham | 11 | 11 | 11
(England) Daryl Selby | 11 | 11 | 11
Q | (Scotland) Alan Clyne | 9 | 9 | 9
Q | (Egypt) Ali Farag * | 11 | 7 | 11 | 11
6 | (England) Peter Barker | 5 | 11 | 3 | 3
8 | (Egypt) Tarek Momen | 11 | 8 | 11 | 4 | 7
(Egypt) Karim Abdel Gawad * | 5 | 11 | 7 | 11 | 11
Q | (France) Grégoire Marche | 11 | 11 | 11
(England) Tom Richards | 6 | 2 | 6
(Egypt) Fares Dessouky | 11 | 11 | 11
(India) Saurav Ghosal | 7 | 8 | 3
(Spain) Borja Golán | 5 | 8 | 4
2 | (France) Grégory Gaultier * | 11 | 11 | 11

Second round
1 | (Egypt) Mohd El Shorbagy * | 11 | 11 | 11
Q | (Egypt) Mohamed Abouelghar | 6 | 8 | 3
(Hong Kong) Max Lee * | 11 | 11 | 11
5 | (Germany) Simon Rösner | 5 | 8 | 9
Q | (Australia) Ryan Cuskelly * | 11 | 11 | 11
(England) Chris Simpson | 4 | 6 | 7
(England) Adrian Waller | wo
3 | (Colombia) Miguel Á. Rodríguez
4 | (Egypt) Omar Mosaad | 10 | 11 | 7
(Egypt) Mazen Hesham * | 12 | 13 | 11
(England) Daryl Selby | 7 | 8 | 2
Q | (Egypt) Ali Farag * | 11 | 11 | 11
(Egypt) Karim Abdel Gawad * | 11 | 4 | 11 | 10 | 11
Q | (France) Grégoire Marche | 8 | 11 | 5 | 12 | 8
(Egypt) Fares Dessouky | 4 | 10 | 9
2 | (France) Grégory Gaultier * | 11 | 12 | 11

Quarter finals
1 | (Egypt) Mohd El Shorbagy * | 14 | 11 | 11
(Hong Kong) Max Lee | 12 | 6 | 6
Q | (Australia) Ryan Cuskelly * | 9 | 7 | 11 | 11 | 11
3 | (Colombia) Miguel Á. Rodríguez | 11 | 11 | 5 | 5 | 2
(Egypt) Mazen Hesham * | 11 | 12 | 11
Q | (Egypt) Ali Farag | 8 | 10 | 8
(Egypt) Karim Abdel Gawad | 11 | 11 | 4 | 7 | 6
2 | (France) Grégory Gaultier * | 7 | 6 | 11 | 11 | 11

Semi finals
1 | (Egypt) Mohd El Shorbagy * | 11 | 11 | 11
Q | (Australia) Ryan Cuskelly | 7 | 4 | 9
Final
1 | (Egypt) Mohd El Shorbagy * | 11 | 11 | 5 | 12
2 | (France) Grégory Gaultier | 5 | 7 | 11 | 10
(Egypt) Mazen Hesham | 11 | 10 | 9 | 12
2 | (France) Grégory Gaultier * | 4 | 11 | 11 | 14

== See also ==
- Qatar Classic
- Women's Qatar Classic 2015
- 2015–16 PSA World Series

| Preceded by US Open; United States (Philadelphia); 2015 | PSA World Series 2015–16; Qatar Classic; Qatar (Doha); 2015 | Succeeded by Hong Kong Open; Hong Kong; 2015 |
