= Men's Windy City Open 2016 =

Windy City Open 2016
- 17th Men's Windy City Open

Details
- Event name: Guggenheim Partners & Equitrust Windy City Open 2016
- Location: Chicago, United States
- Venue: University Club of Chicago
- Website www.windycityopen.com

Men's Winner
- Category: World Series
- Prize money: $150,000
- Year: World Tour 2016

The Men's Windy City Open 2016 was the men's edition of the 2016 Windy City Open, which was a PSA World Series event (prize money: 150 000 $). The event took place at the University Club of Chicago in the United States from 25 February to 2 March. Mohamed El Shorbagy won his first Windy City Open trophy, beating Nick Matthew in the final.

== Prize money and ranking points ==
For 2016, the prize was $150,000. The prize money and points breakdown is as follows:

Prize money Windy City Open (2016)
Event	W	F	SF	QF	2R	1R
Points (PSA)	2625	1725	1050	640	375	190
Prize money	$23,625	$15,525	$9,450	$5,740	$3,375	$1,690

== Seeds ==
1. (Egypt) Mohamed El Shorbagy (champion)
2. (England) Nick Matthew (final)
3. (Egypt) Omar Mosaad (semifinals)
4. (Colombia) Miguel Ángel Rodríguez (semifinals)
5. (Germany) Simon Rösner (quarterfinals)
6. (Egypt) Tarek Momen (quarterfinals)
7. (Egypt) Karim Abdel Gawad (second round)
8. (France) Mathieu Castagnet (quarterfinals)

== Draw and results ==
First round
1	(Egypt) Mohd El Shorbagy *	11	11	12
Q	(Scotland) Alan Clyne	5	9	10
Q	(Mexico) César Salazar	9	8	11	12	6
(Egypt) Mohd Abouelghar	11	11	6	10	11
(France) Grégoire Marche	11	11	5	10	3
(Hong Kong) Max Lee	9	3	11	12	11
Q	(England) Adrian Waller	5	4	9
5	(Germany) Simon Rösner *	11	11	11
7	(Egypt) Karim Abdel Gawad *	10	11	9	11	11
Q	(New Zealand) Paul Coll	12	5	11	8	7
Q	(Hong Kong) Leo Au	7	13	4	13	9
(Egypt) Marwan El Shorbagy	11	11	11	11	11
(England) Tom Richards	11	8	11	11
Q	(Germany) Raphael Kandra	5	11	9	7
(England) Chris Simpson	4	11	8	10
4	(Colombia) Miguel Á. Rodríguez *	11	6	11	12
3	(Egypt) Omar Mosaad *	11	9	11	11
(England) James Willstrop	8	11	4	9
Q	(Egypt) Omar Abdel Meguid	13	8	8	11	8
(India) Saurav Ghosal	11	11	11	7	11
(England) Daryl Selby	12	11	11
(Australia) Cameron Pilley	10	8	5
(Egypt) Ali Farag	11	11	6	11	1
8	(France) Mathieu Castagnet *	8	7	11	13	11
6	(Egypt) Tarek Momen *	12	11	7	11	11
(Switzerland) Nicolas Müller	14	9	11	8	9
Q	(Peru) Diego Elías	7	11	11	11
(Egypt) Fares Dessouky	11	3	6	9
(Spain) Borja Golán	11	13	5	11
(Australia) Ryan Cuskelly	5	11	11	4
WC	(United States) Chris Hanson	6	5	6
2	(England) Nick Matthew *	11	11	11

Second round
1	(Egypt) Mohd El Shorbagy *	11	11	18
(Egypt) Mohamed Abouelghar	9	6	16
(Hong Kong) Max Lee	7	4	12	10
5	(Germany) Simon Rösner *	11	11	10	12
7	(Egypt) Karim Abdel Gawad	8	8	11	11	6
(Egypt) Marwan El Shorbagy *	11	11	4	5	11
(England) Tom Richards	8	11	10	10
4	(Colombia) Miguel Á. Rodríguez *	11	6	12	12
3	(Egypt) Omar Mosaad *	13	11	11	11
(India) Saurav Ghosal	15	1	7	1
(England) Daryl Selby	7	5	11	9
8	(France) Mathieu Castagnet *	11	11	3	11
6	(Egypt) Tarek Momen *	8	11	11	11
Q	(Peru) Diego Elías	11	6	7	7
(Spain) Borja Golán	12	11	3	11	12
2	(England) Nick Matthew *	10	9	11	13	14

Quarter finals
1	(Egypt) Mohd El Shorbagy *	11	11	9	11
5	(Germany) Simon Rösner	8	6	11	7
(Egypt) Marwan El Shorbagy	9	5	8
4	(Colombia) Miguel Á. Rodríguez *	11	11	11
3	(Egypt) Omar Mosaad *	11	12	11	11
8	(France) Mathieu Castagnet	8	14	8	8
6	(Egypt) Tarek Momen	4	5	11
2	(England) Nick Matthew *	11	11	13

Semi finals
1	(Egypt) Mohd El Shorbagy *	11	12	11
4	(Colombia) Miguel Á. Rodríguez	5	10	7
Final
1	(Egypt) Mohd El Shorbagy *	11	11	2
2	(England) Nick Matthew	6	3	0	rtd
3	(Egypt) Omar Mosaad	4	9	11	8
2	(England) Nick Matthew *	11	11	7	11

== See also ==
- Women's Windy City Open 2016
- Windy City Open

Preceded by Tournament of Champions; United States (New York); 2016	2015–16 PSA World Series; Windy City Open; United States (Chicago); 2016	Succeeded by British Open; England (Hull); 2016
