= Men's Tournament of Champions 2016 =

- 82nd Tournament of Champions

Details
- Event name: J. P. Morgan Tournament of Champions 2016
- Location: New York City United States
- Venue: Grand Central Terminal
- Website www.tocsquash.com

Men's Winner
- Category: World Series
- Prize money: $150,000
- Year: World Tour 2016

The Men's J. P. Morgan Tournament of Champions 2016 is the men's edition of the 2016 Tournament of Champions, which is a PSA World Series event (Prize money : 150 000 $). The event took place at the Grand Central Terminal in New York City in the United States from 7 January to 14 January. Mohamed El Shorbagy won his second Tournament of Champions trophy, beating Nick Matthew in the final.

== Prize money and ranking points ==
For 2016, the prize purse was $150,000. The prize money and points breakdown is as follows:

Prize Money Tournament of Champions (2016)
Event	W	F	SF	QF	2R	1R
Points (PSA)	2625	1725	1050	640	375	190
Prize money	$23,625	$15,525	$9,450	$5,740	$3,375	$1,690

== Seeds ==
1. (Egypt) Mohamed El Shorbagy (champion)
2. (England) Nick Matthew (final)
3. (France) Grégory Gaultier (semifinals)
4. (Colombia) Miguel Ángel Rodríguez (first round)
5. (Egypt) Omar Mosaad (quarterfinals)
6. (Germany) Simon Rösner (quarterfinals)
7. (France) Mathieu Castagnet (semifinals)
8. (Egypt) Marwan El Shorbagy (quarterfinals)

== Draw and results ==
First round
1	(Egypt) Mohd El Shorbagy *	11	11	11
Q	(England) Adrian Waller	5	8	2
(Australia) Cameron Pilley *	11	11	11
(Egypt) Tarek Momen	4	3	3
(Switzerland) Nicolas Müller *	11	8	11	11
Q	(Germany) Raphael Kandra	6	11	5	1
Q	(France) Lucas Serme	8	6	4
5	(Egypt) Omar Mosaad *	11	11	11
7	(France) Mathieu Castagnet *	7	11	11	11
(South Africa) Stephen Coppinger	11	4	7	6
Q	(Pakistan) Farhan Zaman	11	6	4	9
(Hong Kong) Max Lee *	9	11	11	11
(Hong Kong) Leo Au *	11	11	11
Q	(France) Grégoire Marche	6	9	7
(Spain) Borja Golán *	11	11	11
4	(Colombia) Miguel Á. Rodríguez	6	6	5
3	(France) Grégory Gaultier *	11	11	11
Q	(India) Ramit Tandon	4	6	3
WC	(United States) Todd Harrity	6	11	6	8
(Egypt) Fares Dessouky *	11	8	11	11
(England) James Willstrop *	11	2
(Botswana) Alister Walker	7	0	rtd
(England) Tom Richards	8	7	1
6	(Germany) Simon Rösner *	11	11	11
8	(Egypt) Marw. El Shorbagy *	11	11	11
(Mexico) César Salazar	5	1	3
Q	(Pakistan) Nasir Iqbal	6	11	7	7
(Australia) Ryan Cuskelly *	11	9	11	11
(Egypt) Karim Abdel Gawad *	11	9	11	3	11
(England) Daryl Selby	7	11	4	11	8
Q	(Peru) Diego Elías	5	11	3	8
2	(England) Nick Matthew *	11	8	11	11

Second round
1	(Egypt) Mohd El Shorbagy *	11	11	11
(Australia) Cameron Pilley	5	9	9
(Switzerland) Nicolas Müller	5	4	14	7
5	(Egypt) Omar Mosaad *	11	11	12	11
7	(France) Mathieu Castagnet *	10	11	10	11	11
(Hong Kong) Max Lee	12	8	12	2	4
(Hong Kong) Leo Au	6	5	13	11	4
(Spain) Borja Golán *	11	11	11	4	11
3	(France) Grégory Gaultier *	11	11	11
(Egypt) Fares Dessouky	5	9	2
(England) James Willstrop	11	4	3	14
6	(Germany) Simon Rösner *	9	11	11	16
8	(Egypt) Marw. El Shorbagy *	12	12	11	12
(Australia) Ryan Cuskelly	10	14	9	10
(Egypt) Karim Abdel Gawad	8	9	3
2	(England) Nick Matthew *	11	11	11

Quarter finals
1	(Egypt) Mohd El Shorbagy *	9	11	11	12
5	(Egypt) Omar Mosaad	11	8	5	10
7	(France) Mathieu Castagnet *	11	13	11
(Spain) Borja Golán	9	11	4
3	(France) Grégory Gaultier *	11	8	14	12
6	(Germany) Simon Rösner	8	11	12	10
8	(Egypt) Marwan El Shorbagy	12	11	7	6	6
2	(England) Nick Matthew *	10	7	11	11	11

Semi finals
1	(Egypt) Mohd El Shorbagy *	11	11	3	11
7	(France) Mathieu Castagnet	9	6	11	7
Final
1	(Egypt) Mohd El Shorbagy *	8	11	11	6	11
2	(England) Nick Matthew	11	6	8	11	6
3	(France) Grégory Gaultier	3	rtd
2	(England) Nick Matthew *	3

== See also ==
- 2015–16 PSA World Series
- 2016 PSA World Tour
- Women's Tournament of Champions 2016
- Tournament of Champions (squash)

Preceded by Hong Kong Open; Hong Kong; 2015	2015–16 PSA World Series; Tournament of Champions; USA (New York); 2016	Succeeded by Windy City Open; United States (Chicago); 2016
