= El Gouna International 2016 =

Squash tournament

- 5th El Gouna International

Details
- Event name: El Gouna International Squash Open 2016
- Location: El Gouna Egypt
- Venue: Abu Tig Marina
- Website www.elgounasquashopen.com

Men's Winner
- Category: World Series
- Prize money: $150,000
- Year: World Tour 2016

The El Gouna International 2016 is the men's edition of the 2016 El Gouna International, which is a PSA World Series event. The event took place at the Abu Tig Marina in El Gouna in Egypt from 24 to 29 April 2016. Mohamed El Shorbagy won his third El Gouna International trophy, beating Grégory Gaultier in the final.

== Prize money and ranking points ==
For 2016, the prize purse was $150,000. The prize money and points breakdown is as follows:

Prize Money El Gouna International (2016)
Event	W	F	SF	QF	2R	1R
Points (PSA)	2625	1725	1050	640	375	190
Prize money	$23,625	$15,525	$9,450	$5,740	$3,375	$1,690

== Seeds ==
1. (Egypt) Mohamed El Shorbagy (champion)
2. (France) Grégory Gaultier (final)
3. (Egypt) Omar Mosaad (quarterfinals)
4. (Egypt) Ramy Ashour (first round)
5. (Egypt) Tarek Momen (second round)
6. (Egypt) Karim Abdel Gawad (second round)
7. (Colombia) Miguel Ángel Rodríguez (semifinals)
8. (Germany) Simon Rösner (quarterfinals)

== Draw and results ==
First round
1	(Egypt) Mohd El Shorbagy	12	11	13
(Egypt) Mazen Hesham	10	9	11
Q	(New Zealand) Paul Coll	11	7	6
(England) Chris Simpson	13	11	11
(Egypt) Mohamed Abouelghar	8	11	12	7	6
Q	(Mexico) César Salazar	11	1	10	11	11
Q	(Scotland) Greg Lobban	9	4	2
8	(Germany) Simon Rösner	11	11	11
7	(Colombia) Miguel Á. Rodríguez	14	11	11
Q	(Malaysia) Mohd Nafiizwan Adnan	12	6	5
(India) Saurav Ghosal	11	4	11	12
(Hong Kong) Leo Au	7	11	13	14
(France) Mathieu Castagnet	6	11	11	11
WC	(Egypt) Zahed Mohamed	11	5	8	7
(Australia) Cameron Pilley	11	6	8	2
3	(Egypt) Omar Mosaad	9	11	11	11
4	(Egypt) Ramy Ashour	10	6	rtd
(Egypt) Marwan El Shorbagy	12	11
Q	(Egypt) Omar Abdel Meguid	2	12	4	16	11
(Hong Kong) Max Lee	11	10	11	14	6
(England) Daryl Selby	11	5	3	11	8
(Egypt) Fares Dessouky	8	11	11	5	11
(Australia) Ryan Cuskelly	11	7	7	5
6	(Egypt) Karim Abdel Gawad	8	11	11	11
5	(Egypt) Tarek Momen	6	12	11	11
Q	(France) Grégoire Marche	11	10	9	6
Q	(Switzerland) Nicolas Müller	7	6	7
(Egypt) Ali Farag	11	11	11
(South Africa) Stephen Coppinger	11	11	9	3	11
Q	(Qatar) Abdulla Al-Tamimi	9	9	11	11	3
(England) Tom Richards	6	8	4
2	(France) Grégory Gaultier	11	11	11

Second round
1	(Egypt) Mohd El Shorbagy	11	11	12
(England) Chris Simpson	8	8	10
Q	(Mexico) César Salazar	6	11	2	7
8	(Germany) Simon Rösner	11	6	11	11
7	(Colombia) Miguel Á. Rodríguez	11	11	11
(Hong Kong) Leo Au	6	6	7
(France) Mathieu Castagnet	13	4	4
3	(Egypt) Omar Mosaad	15	11	11
(Egypt) Marwan El Shorbagy	11	11	11
Q	(Egypt) Omar Abdel Meguid	6	7	5
(Egypt) Fares Dessouky	11	11	11
6	(Egypt) Karim Abdel Gawad	8	6	6
5	(Egypt) Tarek Momen	5	4	rtd
(Egypt) Ali Farag	11	8
(South Africa) Stephen Coppinger	2	8	6
2	(France) Grégory Gaultier	11	11	11

Quarter finals
1	(Egypt) Mohd El Shorbagy	11	11	7	11
8	(Germany) Simon Rösner	8	6	11	4
7	(Colombia) Miguel Á. Rodríguez	9	11	11	12
3	(Egypt) Omar Mosaad	11	6	7	10
(Egypt) Marwan El Shorbagy	12	13	3	12	10
(Egypt) Fares Dessouky	10	11	11	14	12
(Egypt) Ali Farag	11	6	11	4	4
2	(France) Grégory Gaultier	4	11	6	11	11

Semi finals
1	(Egypt) Mohd El Shorbagy	11	11	11
7	(Colombia) Miguel Á. Rodríguez	7	4	5
Final
1	(Egypt) Mohd El Shorbagy	7	9	11	11	11
2	(France) Grégory Gaultier	11	11	3	9	8
(Egypt) Fares Dessouky	11	4	7	3
2	(France) Grégory Gaultier	7	11	11	11

Preceded by British Open; England (Hull); 2015	2015–16 PSA World Series; El Gouna International; Egypt (El Gouna); 2016	Succeeded by Hong Kong Open; Hong Kong; 2016
