= 2016 Men's British Open Squash Championship =

British Open
- 76th Men's British Open

Details
- Event name: Allam British Open 2016
- Location: Hull, England
- Venue: Sports Arena
- Dates: 21–27 March 2016
- Website britishopensquash.net

Men's Winner
- Category: World Series
- Prize money: $150,000
- Year: World Tour 2016

The Men's Allam British Open 2016 is the men's edition of the 2016 British Open Squash Championships, which is a PSA World Series event (Prize money : 150,000 $). The event took place at the Sports Arena in Hull in England from 21–27 March 2016. Mohamed El Shorbagy won his second British Open trophy, beating Ramy Ashour in the final.

== Prize money and ranking points ==
For 2016, the prize purse was $150,000. The prize money and points breakdown is as follows:

Prize Money British Open (2016)
Event	W	F	SF	QF	2R	1R
Points (PSA)	2625	1725	1050	640	375	190
Prize money	$23,625	$15,525	$9,450	$5,740	$3,375	$1,690

== Seeds ==
1. (Egypt) Mohamed El Shorbagy (champion)
2. (France) Grégory Gaultier (semi-finals)
3. (England) Nick Matthew (second round)
4. (Egypt) Omar Mosaad (first round)
5. (Egypt) Ramy Ashour (final)
6. (Colombia) Miguel Ángel Rodríguez (quarter-finals)
7. (Germany) Simon Rösner (quarter-finals)
8. (France) Mathieu Castagnet (first round)

== Draw and results ==
First round
1	(Egypt) Mohd El Shorbagy	11	12	11
Q	(Switzerland) Nicolas Müller	7	10	4
(England) James Willstrop	5	11	11	11
(Egypt) Tarek Momen	11	4	6	7
(England) Daryl Selby	5	7	5
Q	(Egypt) Mohamed Abouelghar	11	11	11
Q	(Germany) Raphael Kandra	8	4	6
6	(Colombia) Miguel Á. Rodríguez	11	11	11
8	(France) Mathieu Castagnet	6	11	10	6
(India) Saurav Ghosal	11	8	12	11
(Egypt) Marwan El Shorbagy	11	6	6	11	11
(Spain) Borja Golán	3	11	11	5	4
(Egypt) Mazen Hesham	2	4	11	9
(Egypt) Fares Dessouky	11	11	6	11
(Egypt) Karim Abdel Gawad	11	11	14	11
4	(Egypt) Omar Mosaad	13	7	12	4
3	(England) Nick Matthew	11	11	11
Q	(England) Adrian Waller	7	4	8
WC	(England) Tom Richards	6	5	5
(Egypt) Ali Farag	11	11	11
(Australia) Ryan Cuskelly	12	13	9	12
Q	(New Zealand) Paul Coll	10	11	11	10
Q	(Mexico) César Salazar	11	11	8	8	3
5	(Egypt) Ramy Ashour	1	6	11	11	11
7	(Germany) Simon Rösner	10	11	11	11
(Hong Kong) Max Lee	12	8	9	8
Q	(Egypt) Zahed Mohamed	5	14	9	11	7
(England) Chris Simpson	11	12	11	9	11
(South Africa) Stephen Coppinger	11	11	11	11
Q	(Malaysia) Mohd Nafiizwan Adnan	3	13	3	5
(Australia) Cameron Pilley	11	6	11	2	7
2	(France) Grégory Gaultier	8	11	7	11	11

Second round
1	(Egypt) Mohd El Shorbagy	11	11	8	11
(England) James Willstrop	6	6	11	5
Q	(Egypt) Mohamed Abouelghar	3	8	8
6	(Colombia) Miguel Á. Rodríguez	11	11	11
(India) Saurav Ghosal	6	6	rtd
(Egypt) Marwan El Shorbagy	11	11
(Egypt) Fares Dessouky	14	3	10	9
(Egypt) Karim Abdel Gawad	12	11	12	11
3	(England) Nick Matthew	11	11	12	7	4
(Egypt) Ali Farag	4	13	10	11	11
(Australia) Ryan Cuskelly	5	9	11	11	11
5	(Egypt) Ramy Ashour	11	11	6	9	13
7	(Germany) Simon Rösner	11	10	10	11	11
(England) Chris Simpson	8	12	12	7	4
(South Africa) Stephen Coppinger	5	1	9
2	(France) Grégory Gaultier	11	11	11

Quarter finals
1	(Egypt) Mohd El Shorbagy	11	11	11
6	(Colombia) Miguel Á. Rodríguez	8	8	9
(Egypt) Marwan El Shorbagy	9	7	11	10
(Egypt) Karim Abdel Gawad	11	11	4	12
(Egypt) Ali Farag	8	8	11	6
5	(Egypt) Ramy Ashour	11	11	9	11
7	(Germany) Simon Rösner	6	6	8
2	(France) Grégory Gaultier	11	11	11

Semi-finals
1	(Egypt) Mohd El Shorbagy	11	11	11
(Egypt) Karim Abdel Gawad	8	7	7
Final
1	(Egypt) Mohd El Shorbagy	11	11	11
5	(Egypt) Ramy Ashour	2	5	9
5	(Egypt) Ramy Ashour	11	12	8	9	11
2	(France) Grégory Gaultier	6	10	11	11	7

== See also ==
- 2016 Women's British Open Squash Championship
- 2016 Men's World Open Squash Championship

Preceded by Windy City Open; United States (Chicago); 2016	2015–16 PSA World Series; British Open; England (Hull); 2016	Succeeded by El Gouna International; Egypt (Cairo); 2016
