= Men's United States Open (squash) 2015 =

US Open 2015
- 28th Men's U.S. Open

Details
- Event name: Delaware Investments US Open 2015
- Location: (United States) Philadelphia, Pennsylvania
- Venue: Daskalakis Athletic Center
- Website www.usopensquash.com

Men's Winner
- Category: World Series
- Prize money: $150,000
- Year: World Tour 2015

The Men's United States Squash Open 2015 was the men's edition of the 2015 United States Open (squash), which is a PSA World Series event (prize money: $150,000). The event took place at the Daskalakis Athletic Center in Philadelphia, Pennsylvania in the United States from the 10th of October to the 17th October. Grégory Gaultier won his third US Open trophy, beating Omar Mosaad in the final.

== Prize money and ranking points ==
For 2015, the prize purse was $150,000. The on-site prize money and points breakdown was as follows:

Prize money US Open (2015)
Event	W	F	SF	QF	2R	1R
Points (PSA)	2625	1725	1050	640	375	190
Prize money	$23,625	$15,525	$9,450	$5,740	$3,375	$1,690

== Seeds ==
1. (Egypt) Mohamed El Shorbagy (semifinals)
2. (England) Nick Matthew (semifinals)
3. (France) Grégory Gaultier (champion)
4. (Colombia) Miguel Ángel Rodríguez (first round)
5. (Egypt) Ramy Ashour (second round)
6. (Egypt) Omar Mosaad (final)
7. (Germany) Simon Rösner (quarterfinals)
8. (England) Peter Barker (first round)

== Draw and results ==
First round
1	(Egypt) Mohd El Shorbagy *	11	11	11
(Mexico) César Salazar	9	9	8
Q	(Scotland) Greg Lobban	11	7	11	2	11
(Hong Kong) Max Lee	8	11	6	11	7
(France) Mathieu Castagnet	11	11	11
Q	(Australia) Ryan Cuskelly	4	9	5
Q	(Malaysia) Mohd Nafiizwan Adnan	9	3	7
5	(Egypt) Ramy Ashour *	11	11	11
7	(Germany) Simon Rösner *	7	12	13	11
Q	(Egypt) Ali Farag	11	10	11	4
Q	(Scotland) Alan Clyne	8	10	11	11	7
(Botswana) Alister Walker	11	12	4	5	11
(Switzerland) Nicolas Müller	16	7	6	9
(England) Tom Richards	14	11	11	11
(India) Saurav Ghosal	5	6	10
3	(France) Grégory Gaultier *	11	11	12
4	(Colombia) Miguel Á. Rodríguez	10	6	7
(South Africa) Stephen Coppinger *	12	11	11
WC	(United States) Christopher Gordon	5	8	6
(England) Daryl Selby *	11	11	11
(Egypt) Tarek Momen	11	13	11
(England) Adrian Waller	8	11	9
Q	(Netherlands) Laurens Jan Anjema	9	4	8
6	(Egypt) Omar Mosaad	11	11	11
8	(England) Peter Barker	8	7	8
(Egypt) Mazen Hesham *	11	11	11
Q	(Peru) Diego Elías	11	6	11	4	5
(Egypt) Fares Dessouky	9	11	9	11	11
(Australia) Cameron Pilley	10	11	5	9
Q	(Egypt) Zahed Mohamed	12	6	11	11
(England) Chris Simpson	11	3	11	4	4
2	(England) Nick Matthew *	8	11	8	11	11

Second round
1	(Egypt) Mohd El Shorbagy *	11	11	11
Q	(Scotland) Greg Lobban	8	3	8
(France) Mathieu Castagnet *	6
5	(Egypt) Ramy Ashour	1	rtd
7	(Germany) Simon Rösner *	11	11	11
(Botswana) Alister Walker	4	9	8
(England) Tom Richards	4	6	8
3	(France) Grégory Gaultier *	11	11	11
(South Africa) Stephen Coppinger	11	11	4	11	8
(England) Daryl Selby *	2	13	11	5	11
(Egypt) Tarek Momen	13	7	13
6	(Egypt) Omar Mosaad *	15	11	15
(Egypt) Mazen Hesham	12	8	4	5
(Egypt) Fares Dessouky *	10	11	11	11
Q	(Egypt) Zahed Mohamed	3	6	6
2	(England) Nick Matthew *	11	11	11

Quarter finals
1	(Egypt) Mohd El Shorbagy *	15	11	11
(France) Mathieu Castagnet	13	8	8
7	(Germany) Simon Rösner	4	3	9
3	(France) Grégory Gaultier *	11	11	11
(England) Daryl Selby	11	3	6	11	5
6	(Egypt) Omar Mosaad *	6	11	11	5	11
(Egypt) Fares Dessouky	6	2	7
2	(England) Nick Matthew *	11	11	11

Semi finals
1	(Egypt) Mohamed El Shorbagy	12	3	11	4	4
3	(France) Grégory Gaultier *	10	11	5	11	11
Final
3	(France) Grégory Gaultier *	11	11	11
6	(Egypt) Omar Mosaad	6	3	5
6	(Egypt) Omar Mosaad *	11	2	11	11
2	(England) Nick Matthew	9	11	5	7

== See also ==
- United States Open (squash)
- 2015–16 PSA World Series
- Women's United States Open (squash) 2015

Preceded by British Open; England (Hull); 2015	PSA World Series 2015–16; United States Open; United States (Philadelphia); 2015	Succeeded by Qatar Classic; Qatar (Doha); 2015
