= Squash Colombia Open 2016 =

- 1st Squash Colombia Open

Details
- Event name: Squash Colombia Open 2016
- Location: Cartagena Colombia
- Venue: Plaza de la Aduana
- Website www.squashsite.co.uk/2009/colombian2016.htm

Men's Winner
- Category: International 100
- Prize money: $115,000
- Year: World Tour 2016

The Squash Colombia Open 2016 is the men's edition of the 2016 Squash Colombia Open, which is a tournament of the PSA World Tour event International (prize money: $115,000). The event took place at the Plaza de la Aduana in Cartagena in Colombia from 16 to 20 of February. Mohamed El Shorbagy won his first Squash Colombia Open trophy, beating Omar Mosaad in the final.

== Prize money and ranking points ==
For 2016, the prize purse was $115,000. The prize money and points breakdown is as follows:

Prize money Squash Colombia Open (2016)
| Event | W | F | SF | QF | 1R |
| Points (PSA) | 1750 | 1150 | 700 | 430 | 250 |
| Prize money | $20,425 | $13,975 | $9,140 | $5,645 | $3,225 |

== Seeds ==
1. (Egypt) Mohamed El Shorbagy (champion)
2. (Egypt) Omar Mosaad (final)
3. (Colombia) Miguel Ángel Rodríguez (quarterfinals)
4. (Egypt) Tarek Momen (semifinals)
5. (Egypt) Marwan El Shorbagy (semifinals)
6. (Australia) Cameron Pilley (quarterfinals)
7. (Australia) Ryan Cuskelly (first round)
8. (India) Saurav Ghosal (quarterfinals)

== Draw and results ==
First round
1 | (Egypt) Mohd El Shorbagy * | 11 | 11 | 11
WC | (Colombia) Andrés Herrera | 6 | 8 | 5
(England) Tom Richards * | 11 | 11 | 11
7 | (Australia) Ryan Cuskelly | 9 | 4 | 8
5 | (Egypt) Marwan El Shorbagy * | 11 | 13 | 7 | 2 | 11
(Spain) Borja Golán | 9 | 11 | 11 | 11 | 8
Q | (Scotland) Alan Clyne | 11 | 11 | 7 | 11 | 2
3 | (Colombia) Miguel Á. Rodríguez * | 8 | 13 | 11 | 8 | 11
4 | (Egypt) Tarek Momen * | 9 | 11 | 11 | 11
Q | (Mexico) César Salazar | 11 | 9 | 4 | 7
(South Africa) Stephen Coppinger | 7 | 7 | 3
6 | (Australia) Cameron Pilley * | 11 | 11 | 11
8 | (India) Saurav Ghosal * | 11 | 2 | 5 | 11 | 11
Q | (Peru) Diego Elías | 9 | 11 | 11 | 8 | 6
Q | (Egypt) Zahed Mohamed | 4 | 4 | 11
2 | (Egypt) Omar Mosaad * | 11 | 11 | 13

Quarter finals
1 | (Egypt) Mohd El Shorbagy * | 11 | 11 | 11
(England) Tom Richards | 7 | 8 | 5
5 | (Egypt) Marwan El Shorbagy * | 5 | 11 | 11 | 11
3 | (Colombia) Miguel Á. Rodríguez | 11 | 4 | 8 | 4
4 | (Egypt) Tarek Momen * | 11 | 11 | 11
6 | (Australia) Cameron Pilley | 8 | 9 | 7
8 | (India) Saurav Ghosal | 4 | 5 | 10
2 | (Egypt) Omar Mosaad * | 11 | 11 | 12

Semi finals
1 | (Egypt) Mohd El Shorbagy * | 11 | 11 | 9 | 11
5 | (Egypt) Marwan El Shorbagy | 4 | 7 | 11 | 8
4 | (Egypt) Tarek Momen | 11 | 11 | 4 | 5 | 9
2 | (Egypt) Omar Mosaad * | 8 | 7 | 11 | 11 | 11

Final
1 | (Egypt) Mohd El Shorbagy * | 11 | 7 | 11 | 11
2 | (Egypt) Omar Mosaad | 9 | 11 | 3 | 9

== See also ==
- 2016 PSA World Tour
- Squash Colombia Open
