= Women's Hong Kong squash Open 2015 =

Cathay Pacific Hong Kong Open 2015
- 14th Women's Hong Kong Open

Details
- Event name: Cathay Pacific Sun Hung Kai Financial Hong Kong Squash Open 2015
- Location: Hong Kong
- Venue: Hong Kong Squash Centre
- Website http://www.hksquashopen.com

Women's Winner
- Category: World Series
- Prize money: $95,000
- Year: World Tour 2015

The Women's Cathay Pacific Hong Kong Open 2015 is the women's edition of the 2015 Hong Kong Open, which is a PSA World Series event (Prize money : 95 000 $). The event took place in Hong Kong from 1 December to 6 December. Nicol David won her tenth Hong Kong Open trophy, beating Laura Massaro in the final.

== Prize money and ranking points ==
For 2015, the prize purse was $95,000. The prize money and points breakdown is as follows:

Prize Money Hong Kong Open (2015)
Event	W	F	SF	QF	2R	1R
Points (PSA)	4800	3300	1950	1050	525	300
Prize money	$13,600	$8,320	$5,120	$3,040	$1,800	$1,060

== Seeds ==
1. (Egypt) Raneem El Weleily (semifinals)
2. (Malaysia) Nicol David (champion)
3. (England) Laura Massaro (final)
4. (France) Camille Serme (quarterfinals)
5. (Egypt) Omneya Abdel Kawy (semifinals)
6. (Egypt) Nouran Gohar (quarterfinals)
7. (Hong Kong) Annie Au (first round)
8. (United States) Amanda Sobhy (quarterfinals)
9. (Malaysia) Low Wee Wern (second round)
10. (Malaysia) Delia Arnold (second round)
11. (Australia) Rachael Grinham (second round)
12. (England) Jenny Duncalf (second round)
13. (England) Emily Whitlock (second round)
14. (India) Dipika Pallikal (second round)
15. (India) Joshna Chinappa (second round)
16. (Egypt) Heba El Torky (second round)

== Draw and results ==
First round
1	(Egypt) Raneem El Weleily *	11	11	11
Q	(South Africa) Siyoli Waters	7	4	4
Q	(France) Coline Aumard	7	11	11	5	12
9	(Malaysia) Low Wee Wern	11	4	9	11	14
12	(England) Jenny Duncalf	11	11	9	11
(Denmark) Line Hansen	6	7	11	1
(Australia) Donna Urquhart	8	8	5
8	(United States) Amanda Sobhy *	11	11	11
6	(Egypt) Nouran Gohar *	11	11	7	11
(Hong Kong) Joey Chan	6	6	11	4
Q	(Mexico) Samantha Terán	9	1	10
13	(England) Emily Whitlock	11	11	12
16	(Egypt) Heba El Torky	11	11	11
Q	(Hong Kong) Vanessa Chu	7	7	6
Q	(Australia) Christine Nunn	4	4	5
3	(England) Laura Massaro *	11	11	11
4	(France) Camille Serme *	11	13	11
(Wales) Tesni Evans	9	11	6
(Egypt) Habiba Mohamed	9	2	2
14	(India) Dipika Pallikal *	11	11	11
11	(Australia) Rachael Grinham	11	11	11
Q	(Hong Kong) Ho Tze-Lok	9	8	7
Q	(New Zealand) Amanda Land.-Murphy	6	11	6	3
5	(Egypt) Omneya Abdel Kawy	11	9	11	11
7	(Hong Kong) Annie Au *	7	6	11	6
(New Zealand) Joelle King	11	11	6	11
Q	(New Zealand) Megan Craig	8	9	6
15	(India) Joshna Chinappa	11	11	11
10	(Malaysia) Delia Arnold	3	11	4	11	12
(Guyana) Nicolette Fernandes	11	6	11	8	10
WC	(Hong Kong) Liu Tsz Ling	3	6	14
2	(Malaysia) Nicol David *	11	11	16

Second round
1	(Egypt) Raneem El Weleily *	11	11
9	(Malaysia) Low Wee Wern	9	3	rtd
12	(England) Jenny Duncalf	8	7	8
8	(United States) Amanda Sobhy	11	11	11
6	(Egypt) Nouran Gohar	11	11	11
13	(England) Emily Whitlock	6	5	9
16	(Egypt) Heba El Torky	9	5	12
3	(England) Laura Massaro *	11	11	14
4	(France) Camille Serme *	7	11	11	11
14	(India) Dipika Pallikal	11	8	3	8
11	(Australia) Rachael Grinham	6	7	11	11	7
5	(Egypt) Omneya Abdel Kawy	11	11	5	9	11
(New Zealand) Joelle King	9	11	9	12	11
15	(India) Joshna Chinappa	11	8	11	10	6
10	(Malaysia) Delia Arnold	1	4	3
2	(Malaysia) Nicol David *	11	11	11

Quarter finals
1	(Egypt) Raneem El Weleily *	11	11	11
8	(United States) Amanda Sobhy	8	5	8
6	(Egypt) Nouran Gohar	5	11	8	6
3	(England) Laura Massaro *	11	6	11	11
4	(France) Camille Serme	9	4	6
5	(Egypt) Omneya Abdel Kawy *	11	11	11
(New Zealand) Joelle King	6	4	3
2	(Malaysia) Nicol David *	11	11	11

Semi finals
1	(Egypt) Raneem El Weleily	4	5	8
3	(England) Laura Massaro *	11	11	11
Final
3	(England) Laura Massaro	13	9	3
2	(Malaysia) Nicol David *	15	11	11
5	(Egypt) Omneya Abdel Kawy	4	5	2
2	(Malaysia) Nicol David *	11	11	11

== See also ==
- Hong Kong Open (squash)
- Men's Hong Kong squash Open 2015
- 2015–16 PSA World Series

Preceded by Qatar Classic; Qatar (Doha); 2015	PSA World Series 2015–16; Hong Kong Open; Hong Kong; 2015	Succeeded by Tournament of Champions; United States (New York); 2016
