= Pittsburgh Open (squash) =

Details
- Event name: Pittsburgh Open
- Location: Pittsburgh, Pennsylvania, United States

Men's PSA World Tour
- Category: World Tour PSA 25
- Prize money: $75,000

The Three Rivers Capital Pittsburgh Open or simply Pittsburgh Open is a yearly professional squash tournament held in Pittsburgh, Pennsylvania, United States. It is part of the PSA World Tour.

== Results ==
These are the results from 2011 onwards:

| Year | Dates | Winner | Runner-up | References |
|---|---|---|---|---|
| 2011 | 10–13 Nov | (Botswana) Alister Walker | (England) Adrian Grant | |
| 2014 | 31 Jan - 3 Feb | (Egypt) Karim Abdel Gawad | (Botswana) Alister Walker | |
| 2015 | 29 Jan - 1 Feb | (Egypt) Karim Abdel Gawad | (Scotland) Alan Clyne | |
| 2017 | 2–5 Feb | (Egypt) Zahed Mohamed | (Malaysia) Ivan Yuen | |
| 2018 | 25–28 Jan | (Hong Kong) Max Lee | (England) Ben Coleman | |
| 2019 | 6-10 Feb | (France) Gregoire Marche | (Egypt) Zahed Salem | |
| 2020 | 22-26 Jan | (Egypt) Fares Dessouky | (India) Saurav Ghosal | |
| | 2021-2022 not held | | | |
| 2023 | 8-12 Feb | (Peru) Diego Elías | (Egypt) Marwan El Shorbagy | |
| 2024 | 7-11 Feb | (Egypt) Karim Abdel Gawad | (England) Marwan El Shorbagy | |
| 2025 | 12-16 Feb | (Wales) Joel Makin | (Egypt) Youssef Ibrahim | |

== See also ==
- PSA World Tour
- WSA World Tour
