= Men's Hong Kong squash Open 2015 =

Cathay Pacific Hong Kong Open 2015
- 29th Men's Hong Kong Open

Details
- Event name: Cathay Pacific Sun Hung Kai Financial Hong Kong Squash Open 2015
- Location: Hong Kong
- Venue: Hong Kong Squash Centre
- Website http://www.hksquashopen.com/home.php

Men's Winner
- Category: World Series
- Prize money: $150,000
- Year: World Tour 2015

The Men's Cathay Pacific Hong Kong Open 2015 is the men's edition of the 2015 Hong Kong Open, which is a PSA World Series event Platinum (prize money: $150,000). The event took place in Hong Kong from 1 December to 6 December. Mohamed El Shorbagy won his second Hong Kong Open trophy, beating Cameron Pilley in the final.

== Prize money and ranking points ==
For 2015, the prize purse was $150,000. The prize money and points breakdown is as follows:

Prize money Hong Kong Open (2015)
Event	W	F	SF	QF	2R	1R
Points (PSA)	2625	1725	1050	640	375	190
Prize money	$23,625	$15,525	$9,450	$5,740	$3,375	$1,690

== Seeds ==
1. (Egypt) Mohamed El Shorbagy (champion)
2. (England) Nick Matthew (semifinals)
3. (France) Grégory Gaultier (quarterfinals)
4. (Colombia) Miguel Ángel Rodríguez (quarterfinals)
5. (Germany) Simon Rösner (second round)
6. (Egypt) Omar Mosaad (semifinals)
7. (Egypt) Tarek Momen (quarterfinals)
8. (France) Mathieu Castagnet (quarterfinals)

== Draw and results ==
First round
1	(Egypt) Mohd El Shorbagy *	11	11	5	11
(England) Peter Barker	6	7	11	8
(India) Saurav Ghosal	9	11	12	9	11
(South Africa) Stephen Coppinger	11	3	10	11	9
(England) Daryl Selby	12	11	11	11
(Malaysia) Mohd Nafi. Adnan	14	6	6	4
Q	(Scotland) Greg Lobban	5	9	5
8	(France) Mathieu Castagnet *	11	11	11
6	(Egypt) Omar Mosaad *	12	11	7	11
(Hong Kong) Max Lee	10	7	11	5
(Spain) Borja Golán	12	6	10	12
Q	(France) Lucas Serme	10	11	12	14
(Scotland) Alan Clyne	7	5	3
(England) Chris Simpson	11	11	11
Q	(France) Grégoire Marche	11	6	3	3
4	(Colombia) Miguel Á. Rodríguez *	6	11	11	8
3	(France) Grégory Gaultier *	11	5	11	11
WC	(Hong Kong) Leo Au	3	11	6	7
(England) James Willstrop	13	11	11	11
(Australia) Ryan Cuskelly	15	6	4	5
(Australia) Cameron Pilley	11	11	11
Q	(Australia) Rex Hedrick	2	5	2
Q	(Finland) Olli Tuominen	9	9	3
5	(Germany) Simon Rösner *	11	11	11
7	(Egypt) Tarek Momen *	12	11	10	11
Q	(England) Declan James	10	7	12	6
Q	(Hong Kong) Tsz Fung Yip	11	9	11	10	11
(England) Tom Richards	9	11	1	12	9
(Egypt) Mazen Hesham	9	3	12	8
Q	(Egypt) Zahed Mohamed	11	11	10	11
(Egypt) Marwan El Shorbagy	4	4	9
2	(England) Nick Matthew *	11	11	11

Second round
1	(Egypt) Mohd El Shorbagy
(India) Saurav Ghosal	wo
(England) Daryl Selby	8	7	11	5
8	(France) Mathieu Castagnet	11	11	7	11
6	(Egypt) Omar Mosaad	4	11	11	6	11
Q	(France) Lucas Serme	11	8	7	11	6
(England) Chris Simpson	10	11	8	5
4	(Colombia) Miguel Á. Rodríguez *	12	5	11	11
3	(France) Grégory Gaultier *	11	11	3	11
(England) James Willstrop	7	8	11	6
(Australia) Cameron Pilley	9	11	13	11	11
5	(Germany) Simon Rösner	11	5	15	7	6
7	(Egypt) Tarek Momen	4	11	11	11
Q	(Hong Kong) Tsz Fung Yip	11	9	7	9
Q	(Egypt) Zahed Mohamed	13	4	5
2	(England) Nick Matthew *	15	11	11

Quarter finals
1	(Egypt) Mohd El Shorbagy *	11	11	11
8	(France) Mathieu Castagnet	5	6	4
6	(Egypt) Omar Mosaad *	3	3	11	11	13
4	(Colombia) Miguel Á. Rodríguez	11	11	9	9	11
3	(France) Grégory Gaultier	9	10	10
(Australia) Cameron Pilley *	11	12	12
7	(Egypt) Tarek Momen	13	4	11	9
2	(England) Nick Matthew *	15	11	6	11

Semi finals
1	(Egypt) Mohd El Shorbagy *	11	11	11
6	(Egypt) Omar Mosaad	4	6	9
Final
1	(Egypt) Mohd El Shorbagy *	11	11	11
(Australia) Cameron Pilley	8	6	8
(Australia) Cameron Pilley *	11	13	12
2	(England) Nick Matthew	9	11	10

== See also ==
- Hong Kong Open (squash)
- 2015 Men's World Open Squash Championship
- 2015–16 PSA World Series

Preceded by Qatar Classic; Qatar (Doha); 2015	PSA World Series 2015–16; Hong Kong Open; Hong Kong; 2015	Succeeded by Tournament of Champions; United States (New York); 2016
