= Women's Tournament of Champions 2016 =

Tournament of Champions 2016
- 12th Women's Tournament of Champions

Details
- Event name: Tournament of Champions 2016
- Location: New York City United States
- Venue: Grand Central Terminal
- Website www.tocsquash.com

Men's Winner
- Category: World Series
- Prize money: $150,000
- Year: World Tour 2016

The Women's Tournament of Champions 2016 is the women's edition of the 2016 Tournament of Champions, which is a PSA World Series event (Prize money : 150 000 $). The event took place at the Grand Central Terminal in New York City in the United States from 9 January to 14 January. Nour El Sherbini won her first Tournament of Champions trophy, beating Amanda Sobhy in the final.

== Prize money and ranking points ==
For 2016, the prize purse was $150,000. The prize money and points breakdown is as follows:

Prize Money Tournament of Champions (2016)
Event	W	F	SF	QF	2R	1R
Points (PSA)	4800	3300	1950	1050	525	300
Prize money	$22,950	$15,525	$9,115	$5,400	$3,040	$1,685

== Seeds ==
1. (Egypt) Raneem El Weleily (second round)
2. (Malaysia) Nicol David (semifinals)
3. (England) Laura Massaro (quarterfinals)
4. (France) Camille Serme (quarterfinals)
5. (Egypt) Omneya Abdel Kawy (quarterfinals)
6. (England) Alison Waters (quarterfinals)
7. (Egypt) Nour El Sherbini (champion)
8. (Egypt) Nouran Gohar (semifinals)
9. (Hong Kong) Annie Au (second round)
10. (United States) Amanda Sobhy (final)
11. (England) Sarah-Jane Perry (first round)
12. (New Zealand) Joelle King (first round)
13. (India) Dipika Pallikal (first round)
14. (Malaysia) Delia Arnold (second round)
15. (India) Joshna Chinappa (second round)
16. (England) Emily Whitlock (second round)

== Draw and results ==
First round
1	(Egypt) Raneem El Weleily *	11	11	11
Q	(Wales) Tesni Evans	6	6	5
Q	(Wales) Deon Saffery	5	4	9
10	(United States) Amanda Sobhy *	11	11	11
14	(Malaysia) Delia Arnold	7	13	11	11
(Australia) Rachael Grinham	11	11	7	6
(England) Jenny Duncalf	11	7	5	8
6	(England) Alison Waters	8	11	11	11
8	(Egypt) Nouran Gohar	11	11	11
Q	(Egypt) Yathreb Adel	5	7	6
(Egypt) Heba El Torky	9	11	12	11
12	(New Zealand) Joelle King	11	5	10	9
11	(England) Sarah-Jane Perry	12	9	4
Q	(France) Coline Aumard	14	11	11
Q	(United States) Olivia Blatchford	6	3	11	7
3	(England) Laura Massaro *	11	11	5	11
4	(France) Camille Serme	11	11	11
(Australia) Donna Urquhart	7	5	9
Q	(Japan) Misaki Kobayashi	5	6	9
16	(England) Emily Whitlock	11	11	11
13	(India) Dipika Pallikal	7	10	6
Q	(Egypt) Mariam Metwally	11	12	11
Q	(Mexico) Samantha Terán	14	2	1
7	(Egypt) Nour El Sherbini	16	11	11
5	(Egypt) Omneya Abdel Kawy	11	7	9	11	11
(Malaysia) Low Wee Wern	9	11	11	7	7
WC	(Egypt) Kanzy El Defrawy	11	11	8	8	7
15	(India) Joshna Chinappa	8	8	11	11	11
9	(Hong Kong) Annie Au	11	11	12
(Hong Kong) Joey Chan	9	7	10
(England) Victoria Lust	2	3	2
2	(Malaysia) Nicol David *	11	11	11

Second round
1	(Egypt) Raneem El Weleily	5	11	5	6
10	(United States) Amanda Sobhy *	11	6	11	11
14	(Malaysia) Delia Arnold	5	8	6
6	(England) Alison Waters *	11	11	11
8	(Egypt) Nouran Gohar *	7	11	11	11
(Egypt) Heba El Torky	11	7	2	5
Q	(France) Coline Aumard	3	11	2	10
3	(England) Laura Massaro *	11	8	11	12
4	(France) Camille Serme *	11	11	8	13
16	(England) Emily Whitlock	6	5	11	11
Q	(Egypt) Mariam Metwally	9	8	5
7	(Egypt) Nour El Sherbini *	11	11	11
5	(Egypt) Omne. Abdel Kawy *	11	11	11
15	(India) Joshna Chinappa	9	3	9
9	(Hong Kong) Annie Au	2	5	9
2	(Malaysia) Nicol David *	11	11	11

Quarter finals
10	(United States) Amanda Sobhy *	12	11	11
6	(England) Alison Waters	10	3	9
8	(Egypt) Nouran Gohar *	10	11	5	11	11
3	(England) Laura Massaro	12	9	11	8	9
4	(France) Camille Serme	4	9	11	11	8
7	(Egypt) Nour El Sherbini *	11	11	8	8	11
5	(Egypt) Omneya Abdel Kawy	6	12	12	3	5
2	(Malaysia) Nicol David *	11	10	10	11	11

Semi finals
10	(United States) Amanda Sobhy *	11	11	12
8	(Egypt) Nouran Gohar	9	9	10
Final
10	(United States) Amanda Sobhy	4	11	10	8
7	(Egypt) Nour El Sherbini *	11	9	12	11
7	(Egypt) Nour El Sherbini *	11	11	11
2	(Malaysia) Nicol David	8	5	6

== See also ==
- 2016 PSA World Tour
- Men's Tournament of Champions 2016
- Tournament of Champions (squash)

Preceded by Hong Kong Open; Hong Kong; 2015	2015–16 PSA World Series; Tournament of Champions; United States (New York); 2016	Succeeded by Windy City Open; United States (Chicago) 2016
