= 2016 Men's PSA World Series Finals =

PSA World Series Finals 2016
- 21st PSA World Series Finals

Details
- Event name: PSA World Series Finals 2015-2016
- Location: Dubai, United Arab Emirates
- Venue: Burj Park
- Website www.worldseriesfinals.com

Men's Winner
- Category: PSA World Series Finals
- Prize money: $160,000
- Year: World Series 2015–16

The 2016 PSA World Series Finals is the men's edition of the 2016 PSA World Series Finals (Prize money : $160 000). The top 8 players in the 2015–16 PSA World Series are qualified for the event. The event will take place in Dubai in the United Arab Emirates from 24 to 28 May 2016.

== Seeds ==
1. (Egypt) Mohamed El Shorbagy (semifinals)
2. (France) Grégory Gaultier (champion)
3. (England) Nick Matthew (first round)
4. (Egypt) Omar Mosaad (first round)
5. (Colombia) Miguel Ángel Rodríguez (semifinals)
6. (Germany) Simon Rösner (first round)
7. (France) Mathieu Castagnet (first round)
8. (Australia) Cameron Pilley (final)

== Group stage results ==
=== Pool A ===
(Egypt) Mohamed El Shorbagy	11	11		-	4	6		(France) Mathieu Castagnet
(Colombia) Miguel Ángel Rodríguez	8	11	11	-	11	8	9	(England) Nick Matthew

(Egypt) Mohamed El Shorbagy	11	11	-	8	9	(Colombia) Miguel Ángel Rodríguez
(England) Nick Matthew	10	6	-	11	12	(France) Mathieu Castagnet

(Egypt) Mohamed El Shorbagy	10	10	-	12	12	(England) Nick Matthew
(France) Mathieu Castagnet	9	4	-	11	6	(Colombia) Miguel Ángel Rodríguez

Rank	Player	Match	Win	Lost	Games
1	(Egypt) Mohamed El Shorbagy	3	2	1	4
2	(Colombia) Miguel Ángel Rodríguez	3	2	1	4
3	(England) Nick Matthew	3	1	2	3
4	(France) Mathieu Castagnet	3	1	2	2

=== Pool B ===
(Egypt) Omar Mosaad	7	11	6	-	11	5	11	(Australia) Cameron Pilley
(France) Grégory Gaultier	11	11		-	2	9		(Germany) Simon Rösner

(Germany) Simon Rösner	11	11	-	3	7	(Egypt) Omar Mosaad
(France) Grégory Gaultier	11	11	-	3	1	(Australia) Cameron Pilley

(Australia) Cameron Pilley	11	11		-	2	7		(Germany) Simon Rösner
(France) Grégory Gaultier	7	11	11	-	11	8	1	(Egypt) Omar Mosaad

Rank	Player	Match	Win	Lost	Games
1	(France) Grégory Gaultier	3	3	0	6
2	(Australia) Cameron Pilley	3	2	1	4
3	(Germany) Simon Rösner	3	1	2	2
4	(Egypt) Omar Mosaad	3	0	3	2

== Draw and results ==
Semi finals
1	(Egypt) Mohamed El Shorbagy	9	5
8	(Australia) Cameron Pilley	11	11
5	(Colombia) Miguel Ángel Rodríguez	7	7
2	(France) Grégory Gaultier	11	11

Final
8	(Australia) Cameron Pilley	4	5	11	6
2	(France) Grégory Gaultier	11	11	8	11

== See also ==
- 2016 Women's PSA World Series Finals
- PSA World Series 2015–16
- PSA World Series Finals
- PSA World Tour 2015
- PSA World Tour 2016
