= Women's United States Open (squash) 2015 =

US Open 2015
- 16th Women's U.S. Open

Details
- Event name: Delaware Investments United States Open 2015
- Location: (United States) Philadelphia, Pennsylvania
- Venue: Daskalakis Athletic Center
- Website www.usopensquash.com

Women's Winner
- Category: World Series
- Prize money: $150,000
- Year: World Tour 2015

The Women's United States Squash Open 2015 is the women's edition of the 2015 United States Open (squash), which is a WSA World Series event (prize money: $150 000). The event took place at the Daskalakis Athletic Center in Philadelphia, Pennsylvania in the United States from the 10th of October to the 17th of October. Laura Massaro won her second US Open trophy, beating Nour El Tayeb in the final.

== Prize money and ranking points ==
For 2015, the prize purse was $150,000. The prize money and points breakdown was as follows:

Prize money US Open (2015)
| Event | W | F | SF | QF | 2R | 1R |
| Points (PSA) | 4800 | 3300 | 1950 | 1050 | 525 | 300 |
| Prize money | $22,950 | $15,525 | $9,115 | $5,400 | $3,040 | $1,685 |

== Seeds ==
1. (Egypt) Raneem El Weleily (quarterfinals)
2. (Malaysia) Nicol David (quarterfinals)
3. (France) Camille Serme (semifinals)
4. (England) Alison Waters (second round)
5. (England) Laura Massaro (champion)
6. (Egypt) Omneya Abdel Kawy (semifinals)
7. (Egypt) Nour El Sherbini (quarterfinals)
8. (Egypt) Nour El Tayeb (final)
9. (Hong Kong) Annie Au (first round)
10. (England) Emma Beddoes (second round)
11. (Malaysia) Delia Arnold (second round)
12. (Egypt) Nouran Gohar (second round)
13. (Australia) Rachael Grinham (first round)
14. (England) Sarah-Jane Perry (first round)
15. (England) Jenny Duncalf (second round)
16. (India) Dipika Pallikal (quarterfinals)

== Draw and results ==
First round
1 | (Egypt) Raneem El Weleily * | 11 | 11 | 11
(England) Emily Whitlock | 4 | 3 | 5
Q | (Egypt) Yathreb Adel | 10 | 12 | 7 | 8
15 | (England) Jenny Duncalf | 12 | 10 | 11 | 11
10 | (England) Emma Beddoes | 8 | 11 | 11 | 11
Q | (Mexico) Samantha Terán | 11 | 4 | 10 | 5
Q | (Wales) Tesni Evans | 5 | 12 | 8 | 11 | 3
8 | (Egypt) Nour El Tayeb * | 11 | 10 | 11 | 5 | 11
7 | (Egypt) Nour El Sherbini * | 11 | 11 | 11
(Egypt) Salma Hany Ibrahim | 7 | 6 | 6
Q | (Australia) Donna Urquhart | 11 | 11 | 11
13 | (Australia) Rachael Grinham | 9 | 5 | 6
11 | (Malaysia) Delia Arnold | 11 | 11 | 11
(Guyana) Nicolette Fernandes | 3 | 3 | 6
Q | (United States) Olivia Blatchford | 11 | 3 | 5 | 6
3 | (France) Camille Serme * | 8 | 11 | 11 | 11
4 | (England) Alison Waters * | 7 | 11 | 11 | 10 | 11
(England) Victoria Lust | 11 | 7 | 9 | 12 | 7
Q | (New Zealand) Joelle King | 11 | 11 | 11 | 7 | 9
16 | (India) Dipika Pallikal | 8 | 13 | 5 | 11 | 11
9 | (Hong Kong) Annie Au | 6 | 7 | 10
(India) Joshana Chinappa | 11 | 11 | 12
WC | (United States) Sabrina Sobhy | 9 | 11 | 9
6 | (Egypt) Omneya Abdel Kawy | 11 | 13 | 11
5 | (England) Laura Massaro * | 11 | 11 | 11
(Egypt) Heba El Torky | 6 | 8 | 5
(United States) Amanda Sobhy * | 11 | 11 | 11
14 | (England) Sarah-Jane Perry | 6 | 7 | 8
12 | (Egypt) Nouran Gohar | 11 | 11 | 11
Q | (Egypt) Kanzy El Defrawy | 5 | 6 | 7
Q | (Hong Kong) Joey Chan | 6 | 9 | 8
2 | (Malaysia) Nicol David * | 11 | 11 | 11

Second round
1 | (Egypt) Raneem El Weleily * | 4 | 11 | 11 | 11
15 | (England) Jenny Duncalf | 11 | 8 | 6 | 9
10 | (England) Emma Beddoes | 12 | 5 | 3
8 | (Egypt) Nour El Tayeb * | 14 | 11 | 11
7 | (Egypt) Nour El Sherbini * | 9 | 11 | 7 | 11 | 11
Q | (Australia) Donna Urquhart | 11 | 8 | 11 | 3 | 6
11 | (Malaysia) Delia Arnold | 4 | 6 | 4
3 | (France) Camille Serme * | 11 | 11 | 11
4 | (England) Alison Waters | 11 | 5 | 11 | 1 | 6
16 | (India) Dipika Pallikal * | 9 | 11 | 3 | 11 | 11
(India) Joshana Chinappa | 10 | 6 | 5
6 | (Egypt) Omn. Abdel Kawy * | 12 | 11 | 11
5 | (England) Laura Massaro * | 11 | 7 | 11 | 11
(United States) Amanda Sobhy | 8 | 11 | 4 | 9
12 | (Egypt) Nouran Gohar | 6 | 7 | 7
2 | (Malaysia) Nicol David * | 11 | 11 | 11

Quarter finals
1 | (Egypt) Raneem El Weleily | 11 | 7 | 11 | 8 | 9
8 | (Egypt) Nour El Tayeb * | 7 | 11 | 8 | 11 | 11
7 | (Egypt) Nour El Sherbini | 8 | 6 | 8
3 | (France) Camille Serme * | 11 | 11 | 11
16 | (India) Dipika Pallikal | 11 | 6 | 8 | 11 | 3
6 | (Egypt) Omn. Abdel Kawy * | 9 | 11 | 11 | 2 | 11
5 | (England) Laura Massaro * | 8 | 4 | 11 | 11 | 12
2 | (Malaysia) Nicol David | 11 | 11 | 6 | 8 | 10

Semi finals
8 | (Egypt) Nour El Tayeb * | 9 | 11 | 11 | 11
3 | (France) Camille Serme | 11 | 9 | 4 | 7
Final
8 | (Egypt) Nour El Tayeb | 6 | 11 | 11 | 8 | 7
5 | (England) Laura Massaro * | 11 | 9 | 6 | 11 | 11
6 | (Egypt) Omneya Abdel Kawy | 10 | 7 | 9
5 | (England) Laura Massaro * | 12 | 11 | 11

== See also ==
- United States Open (squash)
- 2015–16 PSA World Series
- Men's United States Open (squash) 2015

| Preceded by British Open; England (Hull); 2015 | PSA World Series 2015–16; US Open; United States (Philadelphia); 2015 | Succeeded by Qatar Classic; Qatar (Doha); 2015 |
