= Women's Windy City Open 2016 =

Windy City Open 2016
- 5th Women's Windy City Open

Details
- Event name: Guggenheim Partners & Equitrust Windy City Open 2016
- Location: Chicago United States
- Venue: University Club of Chicago
- Website www.windycityopen.com

Men's Winner
- Category: World Series
- Prize money: $150,000
- Year: World Tour 2016

The Women's Windy City Open 2016 is the women's edition of the 2016 Windy City Open, which is a PSA World Series event (prize money: 150 000 $). The event took place at the University Club of Chicago in Chicago in the United States from the 25 February to 2 March 2016. Raneem El Weleily won her second Windy City Open trophy, beating Nour El Sherbini in the final.

== Prize money and ranking points ==
For 2016, the prize purse was $150,000. The prize money and points breakdown is as follows:

Prize money Windy City Open (2016)
Event	W	F	SF	QF	2R	1R
Points (PSA)	4800	3300	1950	1050	525	300
Prize money	$22,950	$15,525	$9,115	$5,400	$3,040	$1,685

== Seeds ==
1. (England) Laura Massaro (semifinals)
2. (Egypt) Raneem El Weleily (champion)
3. (Malaysia) Nicol David (quarterfinals)
4. (France) Camille Serme (semifinals)
5. (Egypt) Nour El Sherbini (final)
6. (Egypt) Omneya Abdel Kawy (quarterfinals)
7. (United States) Amanda Sobhy (quarterfinals)
8. (Egypt) Nouran Gohar (quarterfinals)
9. (Hong Kong) Annie Au (second round)
10. (New Zealand) Joelle King (second round)
11. (England) Sarah-Jane Perry (second round)
12. (Malaysia) Low Wee Wern (first round)
13. (England) Jenny Duncalf (second round)
14. (Malaysia) Delia Arnold (second round)
15. (England) Emily Whitlock (second round)
16. (England) Victoria Lust (second round)

== Draw and results ==
First round
1	(England) Laura Massaro *	11	11	11
(Denmark) Line Hansen	2	7	5
(Egypt) Heba El Torky	7	4	7
16	(England) Victoria Lust	11	11	11
15	(England) Emily Whitlock	11	8	11	11
Q	(Australia) Christine Nunn	6	11	7	3
WC	(United States) Olivia Blatchford	10	5	9
6	(Egypt) Omneya Abdel Kawy *	12	11	11
5	(Egypt) Nour El Sherbini *	12	11	11
Q	(Mexico) Samantha Terán	10	7	5
(Wales) Tesni Evans	11	7	5	7
14	(Malaysia) Delia Arnold	9	11	11	11
11	(England) Sarah-Jane Perry	11	11	13
Q	(Wales) Deon Saffery	6	5	11
Q	(England) Fiona Moverley	5	1	6
3	(Malaysia) Nicol David *	11	11	11
4	(France) Camille Serme *	11	11	11
Q	(Egypt) Hania El Hammamy	6	9	3
(Hong Kong) Joey Chan	7	12	11	14
12	(Malaysia) Low Wee Wern	11	10	9	12
10	(New Zealand) Joelle King	11	11	6	11
(Australia) Donna Urquhart	8	4	11	5
(Egypt) Salma Hany Ibrahim	2	4	5
7	(United States) Amanda Sobhy *	11	11	11
8	(Egypt) Nouran Gohar *	11	11	11
Q	(Egypt) Mariam Metwally	9	6	4
(Guyana) Nicolette Fernandes	10	7	5
13	(England) Jenny Duncalf	12	11	11
9	(Hong Kong) Annie Au	11	11	11
Q	(Belgium) Nele Gilis	5	8	1
Q	(France) Coline Aumard	3	3	1
2	(Egypt) Raneem El Weleily *	11	11	11

Second round
1	(England) Laura Massaro *	11	11	11
16	(England) Victoria Lust	5	2	9
15	(England) Emily Whitlock	10	11	9	4
6	(Egypt) Omneya Abdel Kawy *	12	5	11	11
5	(Egypt) Nour El Sherbini *	11	11	11
14	(Malaysia) Delia Arnold	5	9	8
11	(England) Sarah-Jane Perry	6	9	5
3	(Malaysia) Nicol David *	11	11	11
4	(France) Camille Serme *	11	11	11
(Hong Kong) Joey Chan	6	5	2
10	(New Zealand) Joelle King	6	4	5
7	(United States) Amanda Sobhy *	11	11	11
8	(Egypt) Nouran Gohar *	11	11	11
13	(England) Jenny Duncalf	9	9	4
9	(Hong Kong) Annie Au	13	11	8	7
2	(Egypt) Raneem El Weleily *	15	7	11	11

Quarter finals
1	(England) Laura Massaro *	11	11	11
6	(Egypt) Omneya Abdel Kawy	7	7	9
5	(Egypt) Nour El Sherbini *	11	12	11
3	(Malaysia) Nicol David	9	10	9
4	(France) Camille Serme *	6	11	5	12	11
7	(United States) Amanda Sobhy	11	4	11	10	9
8	(Egypt) Nouran Gohar	8	8	9
2	(Egypt) Raneem El Weleily *	11	11	11

Semi finals
1	(England) Laura Massaro	7	9	9
5	(Egypt) Nour El Sherbini *	11	11	11
Final
5	(Egypt) Nour El Sherbini	11	6	3	6
2	(Egypt) Raneem El Weleily *	9	11	11	11
4	(France) Camille Serme	9	11	8
2	(Egypt) Raneem El Weleily *	11	13	11

== See also ==
- 2015–16 PSA World Series
- Men's Windy City Open 2016
- Windy City Open

Preceded by Tournament of Champions; United States (New York); 2016	2015–16 PSA World Series; Windy City Open; United States (Chicago); 2016	Succeeded by British Open; England (Hull); 2016
