= 2016 Women's British Open Squash Championship =

British Open Squash Championships
- 86th Women's British Open

Details
- Event name: Allam British Open 2016
- Location: Hull, England
- Venue: Sports Arena
- Website britishopensquash.net

Women's Winner
- Category: World Series
- Prize money: $130,000
- Year: World Tour 2016

The Women's Allam British Open 2016 is the women's edition of the 2016 British Open Squash Championships, which is a PSA World Series event (prize money: $130 000). The event took place at the Sports Arena in Hull in the England from 21 to 27 March. Nour El Sherbini won her first British Open trophy, beating Nouran Gohar in the final.

== Prize money and ranking points ==
For 2016, the prize purse was of $130,000. The prize money and points breakdown is as follows:

Prize Money British Open (2016)
| Event | W | F | SF | QF | 2R | 1R |
| Points (PSA) | 4800 | 3300 | 1950 | 1050 | 525 | 300 |
| Prize money | $19,550 | $11,960 | $7,360 | $4,370 | $2,590 | $1,520 |

== Seeds ==
1. (England) Laura Massaro (quarter-finals)
2. (Malaysia) Nicol David (semi-finals)
3. (Egypt) Raneem El Weleily (quarter-finals)
4. (Egypt) Nour El Sherbini (champion)
5. (France) Camille Serme (semi-finals)
6. (Egypt) Omneya Abdel Kawy (quarter-finals)
7. (United States) Amanda Sobhy (quarter-finals)
8. (Egypt) Nouran Gohar (final)
9. (Hong Kong) Annie Au (second round)
10. (England) Sarah-Jane Perry (second round)
11. (England) Alison Waters (second round)
12. (Malaysia) Low Wee Wern (first round)
13. (India) Joshna Chinappa (first round)
14. (Malaysia) Delia Arnold (second round)
15. (England) Jenny Duncalf (first round)
16. (England) Emily Whitlock (first round)

== Draw and results ==
First round
1 | (England) Laura Massaro | 11 | 11 | 11
Q | (United States) Olivia Blatchford | 2 | 5 | 6
(Denmark) Line Hansen | 9 | 8 | 11 | 11 | 11
14 | (Malaysia) Delia Arnold | 11 | 11 | 8 | 5 | 9
16 | (England) Emily Whitlock | 5 | 7 | 5
(England) Victoria Lust | 11 | 11 | 11
WC | (England) Fiona Moverley | 7 | 6 | 3
5 | (France) Camille Serme | 11 | 11 | 11
8 | (Egypt) Nouran Gohar | 11 | 11 | 11
(Egypt) Heba El Torky | 2 | 1 | 3
Q | (England) Sarah Campion | 5 | 6 | 5
9 | (Hong Kong) Annie Au | 11 | 11 | 11
10 | (England) Sarah-Jane Perry | 11 | 11 | 7
Q | (Egypt) Mariam Metwally | 8 | 3 | 4 | rtd
Q | (Belgium) Nele Gilis | 5 | 3 | 3
3 | (Egypt) Raneem El Weleily | 11 | 11 | 11
4 | (Egypt) Nour El Sherbini | 11 | 11 | 11
(Guyana) Nicolette Fernandes | 3 | 7 | 6
Q | (Hong Kong) Liu Tsz-Ling | 13 | 11 | 4 | 11
15 | (England) Jenny Duncalf | 11 | 8 | 11 | 7
11 | (England) Alison Waters | 11 | 11 | 11
(Australia) Rachael Grinham | 4 | 5 | 6
Q | (France) Coline Aumard | 7 | 7 | 4
7 | (United States) Amanda Sobhy | 11 | 11 | 11
6 | (Egypt) Omneya Abdel Kawy | 9 | 7 | 11 | 11 | 15
Q | (Wales) Tesni Evans | 11 | 11 | 8 | 7 | 13
(Hong Kong) Joey Chan | 11 | 11 | 10 | 10
12 | (Malaysia) Low Wee Wern | 5 | 9 | 12 | 8 | rtd
13 | (India) Joshna Chinappa | 10 | 11 | 9 | 5
(Australia) Donna Urquhart | 12 | 7 | 11 | 11
Q | (Egypt) Mayar Hany | 8 | 9 | 0
2 | (Malaysia) Nicol David | 11 | 11 | 11

Second round
1 | (England) Laura Massaro | 11 | 12 | 11
(Denmark) Line Hansen | 9 | 10 | 5
(England) Victoria Lust | 5 | 8 | 3
5 | (France) Camille Serme | 11 | 11 | 11
8 | (Egypt) Nouran Gohar | 11 | 11 | 11
9 | (Hong Kong) Annie Au | 7 | 3 | 8
10 | (England) Sarah-Jane Perry | 9 | 12 | 6
3 | (Egypt) Raneem El Weleily | 11 | 14 | 11
4 | (Egypt) Nour El Sherbini | 11 | 11 | 6 | 11
Q | (Hong Kong) Liu Tsz-Ling | 3 | 7 | 11 | 1
11 | (England) Alison Waters | 8 | 2 | 3
7 | (United States) Amanda Sobhy | 11 | 11 | 11
6 | (Egypt) Omneya Abdel Kawy | 11 | 11 | 11
(Hong Kong) Joey Chan | 5 | 5 | 9
(Australia) Donna Urquhart | 4 | 7 | 6
2 | (Malaysia) Nicol David | 11 | 11 | 11

Quarter finals
1 | (England) Laura Massaro | 8 | 5 | 7
5 | (France) Camille Serme | 11 | 11 | 11
8 | (Egypt) Nouran Gohar | 11 | 11 | 9 | 11
3 | (Egypt) Raneem El Weleily | 9 | 6 | 11 | 9
4 | (Egypt) Nour El Sherbini | 11 | 11 | 14
7 | (United States) Amanda Sobhy | 4 | 7 | 12
6 | (Egypt) Omneya Abdel Kawy | 4 | 14 | 10 | 2
2 | (Malaysia) Nicol David | 11 | 12 | 12 | 11

Semi-finals
5 | (France) Camille Serme | 10 | 9 | 11 | 11 | 9
8 | (Egypt) Nouran Gohar | 12 | 11 | 9 | 9 | 11
Final
8 | (Egypt) Nouran Gohar | 7 | 11 | 11 | 6 | 8
4 | (Egypt) Nour El Sherbini | 11 | 9 | 7 | 11 | 11
4 | (Egypt) Nour El Sherbini | 11 | 2 | 11 | 11
2 | (Malaysia) Nicol David | 6 | 11 | 9 | 6

== See also ==
- 2015–16 PSA World Series
- 2016 Men's British Open

| Preceded by Windy City Open; United States (Chicago); 2016 | 2015–16 PSA World Series; British Open; England (Hull); 2016 | Succeeded by Hong Kong Open; Hong Kong; 2016 |
