= Women's Qatar Classic 2015 =

Qatar Classic 2015
- 12th Women's Qatar Classic

Details
- Event name: Qatar Classic Squash Championship 2015
- Location: Doha, Qatar
- Venue: Aspire Academy
- Website www.squashsite.co.uk/qatar/

Women's Winner
- Category: World Series
- Prize money: $115,000
- Year: World Tour 2015

The Women's Qatar Classic 2015 is the women's edition of the 2015 Qatar Classic, a squash tournament which is a PSA World Series event ($115,000 prize money). The event took place in Doha from 31 October to 6 November. Laura Massaro won her first Qatar Classic trophy, beating Nour El Sherbini in the final.

== Prize money and ranking points ==
In 2015, the prize purse was $115,000. The prize money and points breakdown is as follows:

Prize Money Qatar Classic (2015)
Event	W	F	SF	QF	2R	1R
Points (PSA)	4800	3300	1950	1050	525	300
Prize money	$17,000	$10,400	$6,400	$3,800	$2,250	$1,325

== Seeds ==
1. (Egypt) Raneem El Weleily (first round)
2. (Malaysia) Nicol David (semifinals)
3. (France) Camille Serme (quarterfinals)
4. (England) Laura Massaro (champion)
5. (Egypt) Omneya Abdel Kawy (semifinals)
6. (Egypt) Nour El Sherbini (final)
7. (Hong Kong) Annie Au (quarterfinals)
8. (Egypt) Nouran Gohar (quarterfinals)
9. (Australia) Rachael Grinham (second round)
10. (England) Sarah-Jane Perry (second round)
11. (England) Jenny Duncalf (second round)
12. (India) Dipika Pallikal (first round)
13. (England) Emily Whitlock (first round)
14. (United States) Amanda Sobhy (second round)
15. (Egypt) Salma Hany Ibrahim (first round)
16. (England) Victoria Lust (second round)

== Draw and results ==
First round
1	(Egypt) Raneem El Weleily	9	6	11	9
(India) Joshna Chinappa *	11	11	4	11
(Egypt) Yathreb Adel	11	11	11
12	(India) Dipika Pallikal	5	7	7
10	(England) Sarah-Jane Perry	11	11	11
(Egypt) Habiba Mohamed	6	4	6
(Denmark) Line Hansen	7	14	11	7
5	(Egypt) Omne. Abdel Kawy *	11	16	4	11
8	(Egypt) Nouran Gohar *	11	11	11
Q	(Egypt) Nadine Shahin	8	7	5
Q	(Egypt) Amina Yousry	13	14	9	9	11
13	(England) Emily Whitlock	11	12	11	11	7
15	(Egypt) Salma Hany Ibrahim	11	8	5	5
Q	(England) Fiona Moverley	7	11	11	11
Q	(Egypt) Menna Nasser	8	7	3
4	(England) Laura Massaro *	11	11	11
3	(France) Camille Serme *	11	11	11
Q	(France) Coline Aumard	5	7	6
Q	(Egypt) Hania El Hammamy	4	3	0
14	(United States) Amanda Sobhy	11	11	11
9	(Australia) Rachael Grinham	11	11	8	11
(Egypt) Heba El Torky	6	9	11	9
Q	(United States) Olivia Blatchford	11	7	3	4
6	(Egypt) Nour El Sherbini *	6	11	11	11
7	(Hong Kong) Annie Au *	11	11	8	12	11
(Hong Kong) Joey Chan	9	13	11	10	7
Q	(Egypt) Mayar Hany	11	11	4	5	7
11	(England) Jenny Duncalf	6	8	11	11	11
16	(England) Victoria Lust	13	11	11	11
(Wales) Tesni Evans	15	7	9	8
(Guyana) Nicolette Fernandes	4	4	5
2	(Malaysia) Nicol David *	11	11	11

Second round
(India) Joshna Chinappa *	16	11	11
(Egypt) Yathreb Adel	14	8	8
10	(England) Sarah-Jane Perry	9	7	13
5	(Egypt) Omne. Abdel Kawy *	11	11	15
8	(Egypt) Nouran Gohar *	11	11	11
Q	(Egypt) Amina Yousry	2	5	2
Q	(England) Fiona Moverley	12	9	11	9
4	(England) Laura Massaro *	14	11	5	11
3	(France) Camille Serme *	4	13	11	5	11
14	(United States) Amanda Sobhy	11	11	8	11	9
9	(Australia) Rachael Grinham	11	7	6
6	(Egypt) Nour El Sherbini *	13	11	11
7	(Hong Kong) Annie Au *	14	12	11
11	(England) Jenny Duncalf	12	10	9
16	(England) Victoria Lust	5	5	5
2	(Malaysia) Nicol David *	11	11	11

Quarter finals
(India) Joshna Chinappa	8	11	11	10	6
5	(Egypt) Omne. Abdel Kawy *	11	9	7	12	11
8	(Egypt) Nouran Gohar	8	8	11	6
4	(England) Laura Massaro *	11	11	8	11
3	(France) Camille Serme	11	8	11	8
6	(Egypt) Nour El Sherbini *	13	11	8	11
7	(Hong Kong) Annie Au	7	4	3
2	(Malaysia) Nicol David *	11	11	11

Semi finals
5	(Egypt) Omneya Abdel Kawy	7	4	6
4	(England) Laura Massaro *	11	11	11
Final
4	(England) Laura Massaro *	11	12	11	8	11
6	(Egypt) Nour El Sherbini	8	14	9	11	9
6	(Egypt) Nour El Sherbini *	11	10	5	11	11
2	(Malaysia) Nicol David	6	11	11	4	9

== See also ==
- Men's Qatar Classic 2015
- Qatar Classic
- 2015–16 PSA World Series

Preceded by US Open; United States (Philadelphia); 2015	PSA World Series 2015–16; Qatar Classic; Qatar (Doha); 2015	Succeeded by Hong Kong Open; Hong Kong; 2015
