= Squash Colombia Open =

Details
- Event name: Squash Colombia Open
- Location: Cartagena Colombia
- Venue: Plaza de la Aduana

Men's PSA World Tour
- Category: World Tour International 100
- Prize money: $115,000
- Most recent champion(s): (Egypt) Mohamed El Shorbagy
- Current: Squash Colombia Open 2016

The Squash Colombia Open is a squash tournament held in Cartagena, Colombia in February. It is part of the PSA World Tour.

== Past results ==
Year	Champion	Runner-up	Score in final
2016	(Egypt) Mohamed El Shorbagy	(Egypt) Omar Mosaad	11-9, 7-11, 11-3, 11-9
