= Women's Qatar Classic 2023 =

Qatar Classic 2023
- 13th Women's Qatar Classic

Details
- Event name: QTerminals Qatar Classic Squash Championship 2023
- Location: Doha, Qatar
- Venue: Aspire Academy
- Website qatarsquash.com

Women's Winner
- Category: World Series
- Prize money: $187,500
- Year: World Tour 2024

The Women's Qatar Classic 2023 is the women's edition of the 2023 Qatar Classic, a squash tournament which is a PSA World Series event ($187,500 prize money). The event took place in Doha from 9 September to 16 September. Hania El Hammamy won her first Qatar Classic trophy, after beating Nour El Sherbini in the final.
