= 2016 Women's PSA World Series Finals =

PSA World Series Finals 2016
- 3rd PSA Women's World Series Finals

Details
- Event name: PSA World Series Finals 2015-2016
- Location: Dubai, United Arab Emirates
- Venue: Burj Park
- Website www.worldseriesfinals.com

Men's Winner
- Category: PSA World Series Finals
- Prize money: $160,000
- Year: World Series 2015–16

The 2016 PSA Women's World Series Finals is the women's edition of the 2016 PSA World Series Finals (Prize money : $160 000). The top 8 players in the 2015–16 PSA World Series are qualified for the event. The event will take place in Dubai in the United Arab Emirates from 24 to 28 May 2016.

== Seeds ==
1. (England) Laura Massaro (champion)
2. (Egypt) Nour El Sherbini (semifinals)
3. (Malaysia) Nicol David (semifinals)
4. (Egypt) Raneem El Weleily (final)
5. (Egypt) Nouran Gohar (first round)
6. (France) Camille Serme (first round)
7. (Egypt) Omneya Abdel Kawy (first round)
8. (United States) Amanda Sobhy (first round)

== Group stage results ==
=== Pool A ===
| (England) Laura Massaro | 11 | 13 | - | 7 | 11 | (Egypt) Nouran Gohar |
| (Malaysia) Nicol David | 11 | 13 | - | 6 | 11 | (United States) Amanda Sobhy |

| (England) Laura Massaro | 11 | 8 | 11 | - | 7 | 11 | 7 | (Malaysia) Nicol David |
| (Egypt) Nouran Gohar | 11 | 5 | 7 | - | 8 | 11 | 11 | (United States) Amanda Sobhy |

| (England) Laura Massaro | 13 | 11 | - | 11 | 9 | (United States) Amanda Sobhy |
| (Malaysia) Nicol David | 11 | 11 | - | 7 | 9 | (Egypt) Nouran Gohar |

| Rank | Player | Match | Win | Lost | Games |
|---|---|---|---|---|---|
| 1 | (England) Laura Massaro | 3 | 3 | 0 | 6 |
| 2 | (Malaysia) Nicol David | 3 | 2 | 1 | 5 |
| 3 | (United States) Amanda Sobhy | 3 | 1 | 2 | 2 |
| 4 | (Egypt) Nouran Gohar | 3 | 0 | 3 | 1 |

=== Pool B ===
| (France) Camille Serme | 11 | 13 | - | 9 | 11 | (Egypt) Omneya Abdel Kawy |
| (Egypt) Nour El Sherbini | 10 | 15 | - | 12 | 17 | (Egypt) Raneem El Weleily |

| (France) Camille Serme | 11 | 10 | 9 | - | 9 | 12 | 11 | (Egypt) Raneem El Weleily |
| (Egypt) Nour El Sherbini | 11 | 11 | | - | 4 | 8 | | (Egypt) Omneya Abdel Kawy |

| (Egypt) Raneem El Weleily | 15 | 11 | - | 13 | 9 | (Egypt) Omneya Abdel Kawy |
| (Egypt) Nour El Sherbini | 11 | 11 | - | 4 | 6 | (France) Camille Serme |

| Rank | Player | Match | Win | Lost | Games |
|---|---|---|---|---|---|
| 1 | (Egypt) Raneem El Weleily | 3 | 3 | 0 | 6 |
| 2 | (Egypt) Nour El Sherbini | 3 | 2 | 1 | 4 |
| 3 | (France) Camille Serme | 3 | 1 | 2 | 3 |
| 4 | (Egypt) Omneya Abdel Kawy | 3 | 0 | 3 | 0 |

== Draw and results ==
Semi finals
1 | (England) Laura Massaro | 12 | 11
2 | (Egypt) Nour El Sherbini | 10 | 6
3 | (Malaysia) Nicol David | 5 | 11 | 8
4 | (Egypt) Raneem El Weleily | 11 | 8 | 11

Final
1 | (England) Laura Massaro | 9 | 11 | 5 | 12 | 11
4 | (Egypt) Raneem El Weleily | 11 | 6 | 11 | 10 | 5

== See also ==
- 2016 Men's PSA World Series Finals
- PSA World Series 2015–16
- PSA World Series Finals
- PSA World Tour 2015
- PSA World Tour 2016
