= Qatar Classic =

Squash tournament

Details
- Event name: Qatar Classic Squash Championship
- Location: Doha, Qatar
- Venue: Kahlifa Tennis and Squash Centre
- Website www.squashsite.co.uk/qatar/

Men's Winner
- Category: PSA World Tour Platinum
- Prize money: $187,500

Women's Winner
- Category: World Series
- Prize money: $187,500

The Qatar Classic is an annual international squash tournament that takes place in Doha, Qatar in October or November. The event was re-established in 2001. Between 1992 and 1997, the tournament was formerly known as the Qatar International. The tournament features both men and women, the men's event is part of the PSA World Series and the women's event is part of the WSA World Series.

== Past winners ==
=== Men's ===
Year	Winner	Runner-up	score	Notes/Ref
2001	(England) Peter Nicol	(Australia) David Palmer	15-12, 15-5, 10-15, 12-15, 15-10	
2002	(England) Peter Nicol	(Australia) David Palmer	15-9, 13-15, 15-6, 13-15, 15-7	
2003	(England) Lee Beachill	(Scotland) John White	15-12, 15-5, 11-15, 12-15, 15-9	
2004 not held due to the 2004 World Open
2005	(England) James Willstrop	(Australia) David Palmer	11-1, 11-7, 11-7	
2007	(Egypt) Ramy Ashour	(Australia) David Palmer	8-11, 11-9, 11-9, 11-6	(April)
2007	(Egypt) Amr Shabana	(France) Grégory Gaultier	11-4, 8-11, 11-6, 11-5	(October)
2008	(Egypt) Karim Darwish	(Egypt) Amr Shabana	11-4, 11-5, 11-3	
2009	(England) Nick Matthew	(Egypt) Karim Darwish	11-5, 12-10, 11-6	
2010	(Egypt) Karim Darwish	(Egypt) Amr Shabana	8-11, 11-2, 11-7, 11-6	
2011	(France) Grégory Gaultier	(England) James Willstrop	11-8, 11-7, 2-11, 11-8	
2012 not held due to the 2012 World Championships
2013	(Egypt) Mohamed El Shorbagy	(England) Nick Matthew	11-5, 5-11, 11-6, 6-11, 11-4	
2014 not held due to the 2014 World Championships
2015	(Egypt) Mohamed El Shorbagy	(France) Grégory Gaultier	11-5, 11-7, 5-11, 12-10	
2016	(Egypt) Karim Abdel Gawad	(Egypt) Mohamed El Shorbagy	12-10, 15-13, 11-7	
2017	(Egypt) Mohamed El Shorbagy	(Egypt) Tarek Momen	11-8, 10-12, 11-7, 11-7	
2018	(Egypt) Ali Farag	(Germany) Simon Rösner	11-9, 11-7, 11-5	
2019 not held due to the 2019–20 World Championships
2020	(Egypt) Ali Farag	(New Zealand) Paul Coll	11–8, 6–11, 11–9, 11–9	
2021	(Peru) Diego Elías	(New Zealand) Paul Coll	13–11, 5–11, 13–11, 11–9	
2022	(England) Mohamed El Shorbagy	(France) Victor Crouin	11–4, 11–6, 7–11, 11–8	
2023	(Egypt) Ali Farag	(Peru) Diego Elías	15-13 11-5 8-11 11-9	
2024	(Peru) Diego Elías	(Egypt) Mostafa Asal	12-10 12-10 14-12	
2025	(New Zealand) Paul Coll	(Egypt) Mostafa Asal	11–9, 6–11, 11–8, 11–5	
2026	(Egypt) Mostafa Asal	(France) Victor Crouin	11-5 11-6 11-2	

=== Men's champions by country ===
Champions		Runner-up	
Egypt	12	Egypt	7
England	6	Australia	4
Peru	2	France	3
France	1	England	2
New Zealand	1	Scotland	1
Netherlands	0	Germany	1
Germany	0	Peru	1

=== Women ===
Year	Winner	Runner-up	score	Notes/Ref
2001	(Australia) Sarah Fitz-Gerald	(New Zealand) Leilani Joyce	9-0 9-2 9-1	
2002 not held due to the 2002 World Open
2003	(United States) Natalie Grainger	(New Zealand) Carol Owens	10-9, 9-7, 9-10, 9-4	
2004	(Netherlands) Vanessa Atkinson	(Australia) Rachael Grinham	9-4, 9-7, 9-6	
2005	(Netherlands) Vanessa Atkinson	(England) Vicky Botwright	9-7, 9-4, 9-2	
2007	(Malaysia) Nicol David	(Australia) Natalie Grinham	9-7, 2-9, 9-7, 9-2	(April)
2007	(Malaysia) Nicol David	(United States) Natalie Grainger	9-6, 9-4, 10-9	(October)
2008	(Malaysia) Nicol David	(Netherlands) Natalie Grinham	11-7, 11-3, 11-9	
2009	(England) Jenny Duncalf	(Australia) Rachael Grinham	11-5, 11-3, 11-3	
2010	(Malaysia) Nicol David	(Australia) Rachael Grinham	11-5, 11-8, 11-9	
2011	(Malaysia) Nicol David	(Republic of Ireland) Madeline Perry	11-2, 11-7, 11-3	
2012–2014 No competition
2015	(England) Laura Massaro	(Egypt) Nour El Sherbini	11-8, 12-14, 11-9, 8-11, 11-9	
2016–2022 No competition
2023	(Egypt) Hania El Hammamy	(Egypt) Nour El Sherbini	9-11, 11-9, 9-11, 11-9, 11-6	
2024	(Egypt) Nour El Sherbini	(Egypt) Nouran Gohar	10-12, 5-11, 11-6, 11-9, 11-6	
2025	(Egypt) Hania El Hammamy	(Egypt) Nour El Sherbini	11–6, 15–13, 11–8	
2026	(Egypt) Amina Orfi	(Egypt) Hania El Hammamy	7-11, 11–7, 11–8, 7–11, 12-10	

=== Women's champions by country ===
Champions		Runner-up	
Malaysia	5	Egypt	5
Egypt	4	Australia	4
England	2	New Zealand	2
Netherlands	2	England	1
United States	1	United States	1
Australia	1	Ireland	1
Germany	0	Netherlands	1
