= Mohamed El Shorbagy =

Egyptian/English squash player

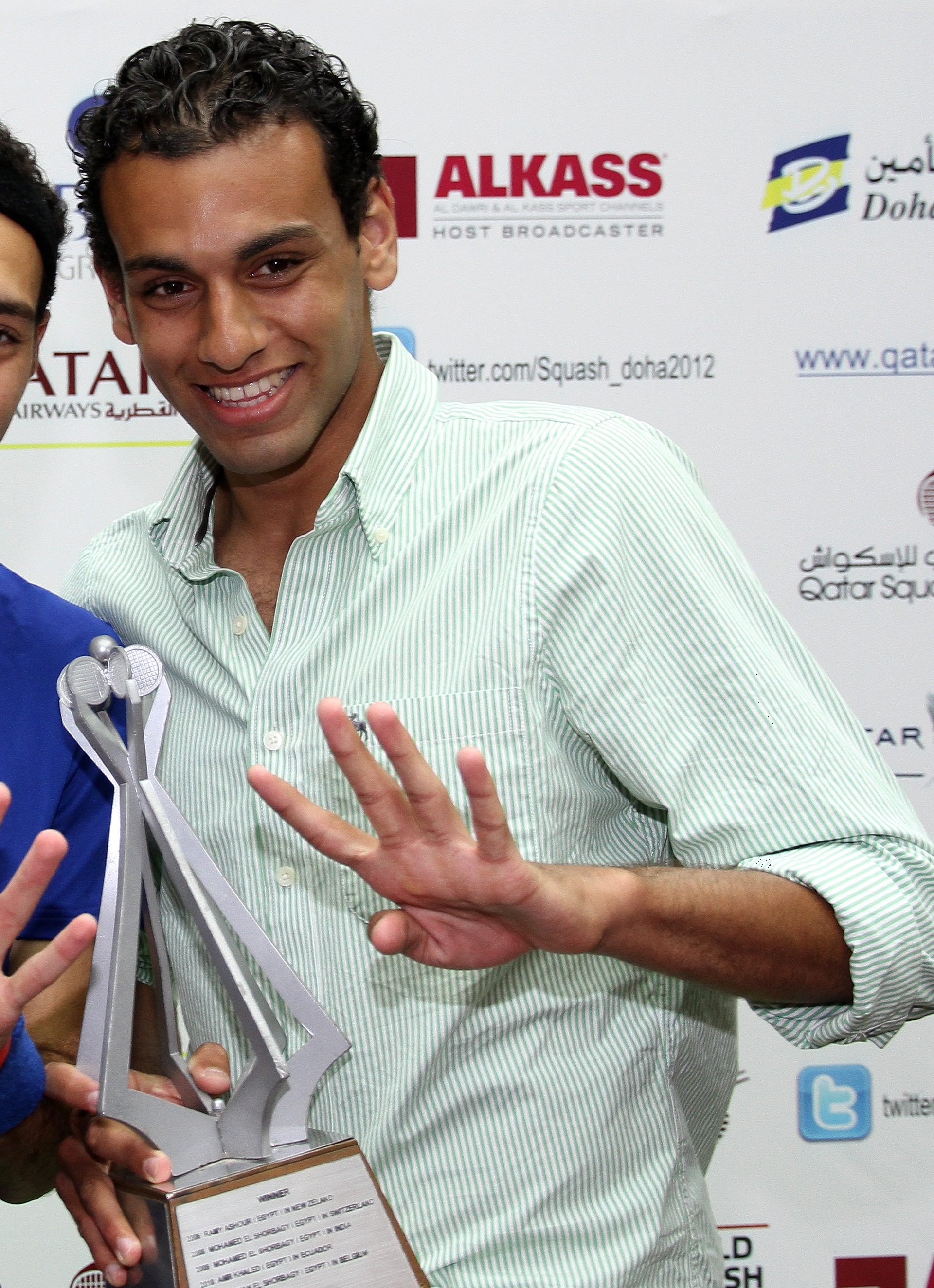
- El Shorbagy in 2009

Personal information
- Nickname: The Beast of Alexandria
- Born: 12 January 1991 (age 35) Alexandria, Egypt
- Height: 185 cm (6 ft 1 in)
- Weight: 82 kg (181 lb)
- Website: Mohamed El Shorbagy on Facebook

Sport
- Country: England since 2022; Egypt until 2022
- Handedness: Right-handed
- Turned pro: 2006
- Coached by: Jonah Barrington, David Palmer, Hadrian Stiff, Graeme Williams, Rodney Martin, Grégory Gaultier
- Retired: Active
- Racquet used: Tecnifibre Carboflex 125 X-top V2

Men's singles
- Highest ranking: World No. 1 (November 2014)
- Current ranking: World No. 7 (4 August 2025)
- Title: 52
- Tour final: 79
- World Open: F (2012, 2014) W (2017)
Medal record
Men's squash
Representing Egypt
World Championships
Gold medal – first place	2017 Manchester	Singles
Silver medal – second place	2012 Doha	Singles
Silver medal – second place	2014 Doha	Singles
Silver medal – second place	2020–21 Chicago	Singles
Bronze medal – third place	2013 Manchester	Singles
Bronze medal – third place	2016 Cairo	Singles
Bronze medal – third place	2018–19 Chicago	Singles
Bronze medal – third place	2019–20 Doha	Singles
World Team Championships
Gold medal – first place	2011 Paderborn	Team
British Open
Gold medal – first place	2015 Hull	Singles
Gold medal – first place	2016 Hull	Singles
Gold medal – first place	2019 Hull	Singles
Representing England
World Championships
Silver medal – second place	2022 Cairo	Singles
Bronze medal – third place	2023 Chicago	Singles
World Team Championships
Silver medal – second place	2023 Tauranga	Team
Silver medal – second place	2024 Hong Kong	Team
European Team Championships
Gold medal – first place	2025 Wrocław	Team

Mohamed El Shorbagy (Arabic: محمد الشوربجي, born 12 January 1991) is an English professional squash player. He represented Egypt from a young age until June 2022, when he switched to represent England. He reached a career-high world ranking of World No. 1 in November 2014, March 2018, February 2020, and again in July 2021 and was the 2017 World Squash champion.

== Early life ==
El Shorbagy attended Millfield School from 2006 to 2009.

== Career overview ==
El Shorbagy joined the PSA tour in 2006, as a 15-year old schoolboy under the tutelage of the legendary Jonah Barrington. The Alexandria-born star rose to prominence in 2007 after he became the first player in history to secure a maiden PSA World Tour title at a five star event.

He became only the second man after fellow Egyptian Ramy Ashour to win the World Junior Championship twice, in 2008 and 2009. The Egyptian came close to winning the senior World Championship in 2012 after beating James Willstrop in a five-game semi-final thriller but lost out to compatriot Ashour in the final.

In 2013, he made it to the semi-finals at the Kuwait PSA Cup, a now defunct World Series Platinum event. He also claimed his first World Series win in the Qatar Classic and exhibited supreme form throughout 2014, winning five events including World Series tournaments at the Hong Kong and US Opens.

In 2014, El Shorbagy opened his year by making the semi-finals of Tournament of Champions, where he lost to Grégory Gaultier in four games. In the 2013 PSA World Series Finals (held in March 2014) El Shorbagy recorded his first win over Ramy Ashour, beating him 11–5, 11–5 in the round-robin stage. In the semifinals El Shorbagy beat Nick Matthew in five games to reach the final but this time lost to Ashour in a tough 4 games. El Shorbagy made the semifinals of the Windy City Open, again losing to Gaultier in four games. El Shorbagy continued good form by making the final of the 2014 El Gouna International.

In November 2014, El Shorbagy became the world number 1 for the first time at the age of 23, courtesy of his victory over Grégory Gaultier in the semi-finals of the 2014 Delaware Investments US Open. "It feels unbelievable right now," said El Shorbagy. "It's been a dream to get to that spot and I can't believe I'm there right now. I came into this tournament knowing there was a big chance to get that World No.1 ranking for the first time in my life."

He was the second seed for the 2014 Men's World Open Squash Championship and reached his second World Championship final, against compatriot Ramy Ashour. The final during the 2014 tournament in Qatar was regarded as one of the greatest squash matches ever.

The Egyptian recovered from his World Championship heartbreak to lift the Tournament of Champions title in January 2015 and, after finishing runner-up at both the Windy City Open and the El Gouna International, he also won the British Open for the first time in his career, beating Gaultier in the 2015 final. El Shorbagy lifted the British Grand Prix title in September 2015 before celebrating 12 months at the summit of the World Rankings the following month. After claiming another PSA World Series triumph at the Qatar Classic in November, he dropped out of the World Championship at third round stage after a shock exit to James Willstrop as his search for the sport's biggest prize continued.

However, a significant run of form from December 2015 to April 2016 saw El Shorbagy dominate the PSA World Tour, bringing him up to six successive World Series title wins, including defending his crown at the British Open after ending a four-match winless run against Ramy Ashour. During that period, El Shorbagy also broke Ashour's record for the highest ever World Rankings points average in April, a record he then shattered again a month later. A superb season was rounded off in style when he was crowned the 2016 PSA Men's Player of the Year.

ElShorbagy started the 2016/17 season strongly with another victory at the U.S. Open, but he missed out on becoming the first player to win the Qatar Classic on three successive occasions after a final defeat to compatriot Karim Abdel Gawad - just a month after Gawad had beaten him in the World Championship semi-final. However, the following month saw ElShorbagy become only the third Egyptian player to spend a whole year at the summit of the World Rankings after he topped the December 2016 World Rankings.

ElShorbagy reached his third world final in November 2017 but this time became the world champion after winning the 2017 Men's World Squash Championship in Manchester. As the third seed he defeated his brother Marwan El Shorbagy in the final.

ElShorbagy dominated the early part of the 2017/2018 season, winning seven of his first nine tournaments including the Netsuite Open, the Channel VAS Championships, the Qatar Classic, the Hong Kong Open, the Canary Wharf Classic, and the Windy City Open. In 2019, he won his third British Open after winning the 2019 Men's British Open Squash Championship.

He won the Manchester Open on 22 September 2020 after 192 days of recess due to the COVID-19 pandemic, for his 42nd PSA title, and won the El Gouna Classic on 28 May 2021 for his 43rd PSA title, moving him to fifth on the all-time squash win list. In July 2021, he lost the World final to Ali Farag during the 2020–21 PSA Men's World Squash Championship. In May 2022, he lost his second consecutive World Championship final, after losing to Farag again in the 2022 PSA Men's World Squash Championship.

On 6 June 2022, ElShorbagy decided to change allegiance to represent England. On 8 June 2022, he won his first game since allegiance change at the Mauritius Open defeating compatriot James Willstrop.

ElShorbagy's victory in New Zealand in November 2022, for his 47th PSA title, also sees him become the youngest man ever to reach 500 PSA wins at the age of 31 years and 10 months. While he is only the third man to achieve that milestone after his coach Gregory Gaultier (587) and Nick Matthew (518), he backed up his New Zealand win with a win over Diego Elias at the MARIGOLD Singapore open on the 20th of November, 2022, to mark his 505th PSA win, and his 48th title in 75 finals. He has since surpassed this feat, recording his 49th title (joint 4th in titles) in the 2023 black ball gold tournament.

In May 2023, he reached the semi final of the 2023 PSA Men's World Squash Championship before being knocked out by Karim Abdel Gawad. In December 2023, El Shorbay won a silver medal with England, at the 2023 Men's World Team Squash Championships in New Zealand.

After winning the 2024 European Team Championships in Switzerland and reaching the quarter-final of the 2024 PSA Men's World Squash Championship in May, he won another silver medal with England at the December 2024 Men's World Team Squash Championships in Hong Kong.

In May 2025 he was part of the England team that won the gold medal at the 2025 European Squash Team Championships in Wrocław, Poland. In January 2026 he secured a 52nd career title during the 2025–26 PSA Squash Tour, after winning the Washington Open.

== Titles and Finals ==
=== Major Finals ===
Major tournaments include:

- PSA World Championships
- PSA World Tour Finals
- Top-tier PSA World Tour tournaments (Platinum/World Series/Super Series)

Year/Season	Tournament	Opponent	Result	Score
2012	PSA World Championships	Ramy Ashour	Loss (1)	11-2 6-11 5-11 11-9 8–11
2013	Qatar Classic	Nick Matthew	Win (1)	11-5 5-11 11-6 6-11 11–4
2013	PSA World Series Finals	Ramy Ashour	Loss (2)	17-15 7-11 4-11 5–11
2014	El Gouna International	Ramy Ashour	Loss (3)	7-11 10-12 11-8 8–11
2014	Hong Kong Open	Grégory Gaultier	Win (2)	11-9 11-2 4-11 8-11 11–4
2014	U.S. Open	Amr Shabana	Win (3)	8-11 11-9 11-3 11–3
2014	PSA World Championships	Ramy Ashour	Loss (4)	11-13 11-7 11-5 5-11 12–14
2015	Tournament of Champions	Nick Matthew	Win (4)	5-11 11-9 11-8 12–10
2015	Windy City Open	Nick Matthew	Loss (5)	7-11 2-11 7–11
2015	El Gouna International	Ramy Ashour	Loss (6)	9-11 6-11 11-4 12-10 10–12
2015	British Open	Grégory Gaultier	Win (5)	11-9 6-11 5-11 11-8 11–5
2015	Qatar Classic (2)	Grégory Gaultier	Win (6)	11-5 11-7 5-11 12–10
2015	Hong Kong Open (2)	Cameron Pilley	Win (7)	11-8 11-6 11–8
2016	Tournament of Champions (2)	Nick Matthew	Win (8)	8-11 11-6 11-8 6-11 11–6
2016	Windy City Open	Nick Matthew	Win (9)	11-6 11-3 2-0 (retired)
2016	British Open (2)	Ramy Ashour	Win (10)	11-2 11-5 11–9
2016	El Gouna International	Grégory Gaultier	Win (11)	7-11 9-11 11-3 11-9 11–8
2016	U.S. Open (2)	Nick Matthew	Win (12)	10-12 12-14 11-1 11-4 3-0 (retired)
2016	Qatar Classic	Karim Abdel Gawad	Loss (7)	10-12 13-15 7–11
2016-17	PSA World Series Finals	James Willstrop	Win (13)	12-10 11-9 11–8
2017	U.S. Open	Ali Farag	Loss (8)	10-12 9-11 8–11
2017	Qatar Classic (3)	Tarek Momen	Win (14)	11-8 10-12 11-7 11–7
2017	Hong Kong Open (3)	Ali Farag	Win (15)	11-6 5-11 11-4 7-11 11–3
2017	PSA World Championships	Marwan El Shorbagy	Win (16)	11-5 9-11 11-7 9-11 11–6
2018	Windy City Open	Marwan El Shorbagy	Win (17)	11-8 11-8 11–6
2018	British Open	Miguel Ángel Rodríguez	Loss (9)	7-11 11-6 11-8 2-11 9–11
2017-18	PSA World Series Finals (2)	Ali Farag	Win (18)	9-11 11-3 11-9 11–8
2018	U.S. Open (3)	Simon Rösner	Win (19)	8-11 11-8 6-11 11-8 11–4
2018	Hong Kong Open (4)	Ali Farag	Win (20)	11-6 11-7 11–7
2019	Tournament of Champions	Ali Farag	Loss (10)	12-10 11-6 6-11 3-11 8–11
2019	British Open (3)	Ali Farag	Win (21)	11-9 5-11 11-5 11–9
2019	U.S. Open	Ali Farag	Loss (11)	4-11 7-11 2–11
2020	Tournament of Champions (3)	Tarek Momen	Win (22)	9-11 11-7 11-7 11–5
2021	El Gouna International (2)	Paul Coll	Win (23)	11-5 11-2 11–7
2020-21	PSA World Tour Finals	Mostafa Asal	Loss (12)	14-12 4-11 7-11 3–11
2020-21	PSA World Championships	Ali Farag	Loss (13)	11-7 10-12 9-11 4–11
2021	Egyptian Open	Ali Farag	Loss (14)	11-6 11-9 2-11 6-11 5–11
2022	PSA World Championships	Ali Farag	Loss (15)	11-9 8-11 11-7 9-11 2–11
2022	Qatar Classic (4)	Victor Crouin	Win (24)	11-4 11-6 7-11 11–8

Sporting positions
Preceded by Grégory Gaultier Grégory Gaultier Ali Farag	World No. 1 November 2014 - November 2015; January 2016 - March 2017; March 2018 - January 2019; February 2020 - October 2020	Succeeded by Grégory Gaultier Ali Farag Ali Farag
Awards and achievements
Preceded by Omar Mosaad	PSA Young Player of the Year; 2009-10	Succeeded by Nicolas Müller
