= Heba El Torky =

Egyptian squash player (born 1991)

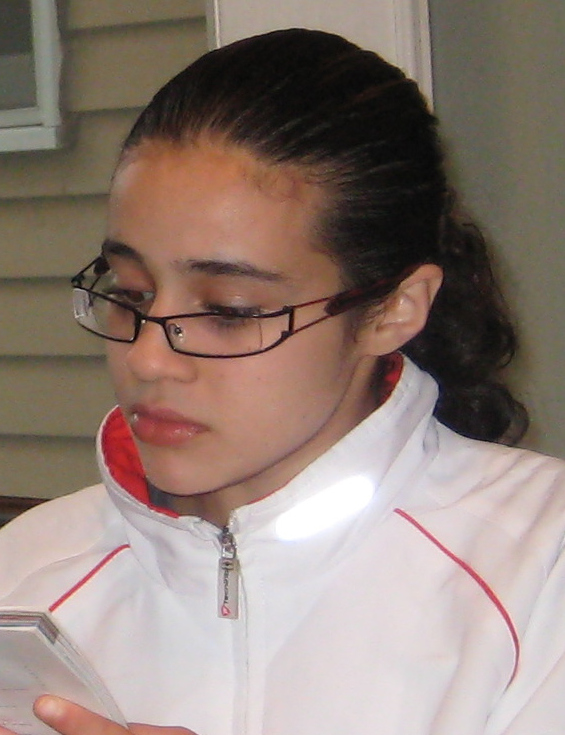
- Heba El Torky in 2008

Personal information
- Born: 15 January 1991 (age 35) Alexandria, Egypt

Sport
- Country: Egypt
- Handedness: Right Handed
- Turned pro: 2005
- Coached by: Emad Kourit; Nasser Abdel Monium
- Retired: Active
- Racquet used: Tecnifibre

Women's singles
- Highest ranking: No. 19 (December 2016)
- Current ranking: No. 19 (December 2016)
- Title: 5
- Tour final: 5
- Updated on December 2016

Heba El Torky (born 15 January 1991 in Alexandria) is an Egyptian professional squash player.

== Career ==
El Torky has represented Egypt at the international level. She reached a career-high world ranking of World No. 19 in December 2016.

Heba's sister Nouran is also a professional squash player.
