= Emily Whitlock =

English squash player (born 1994)

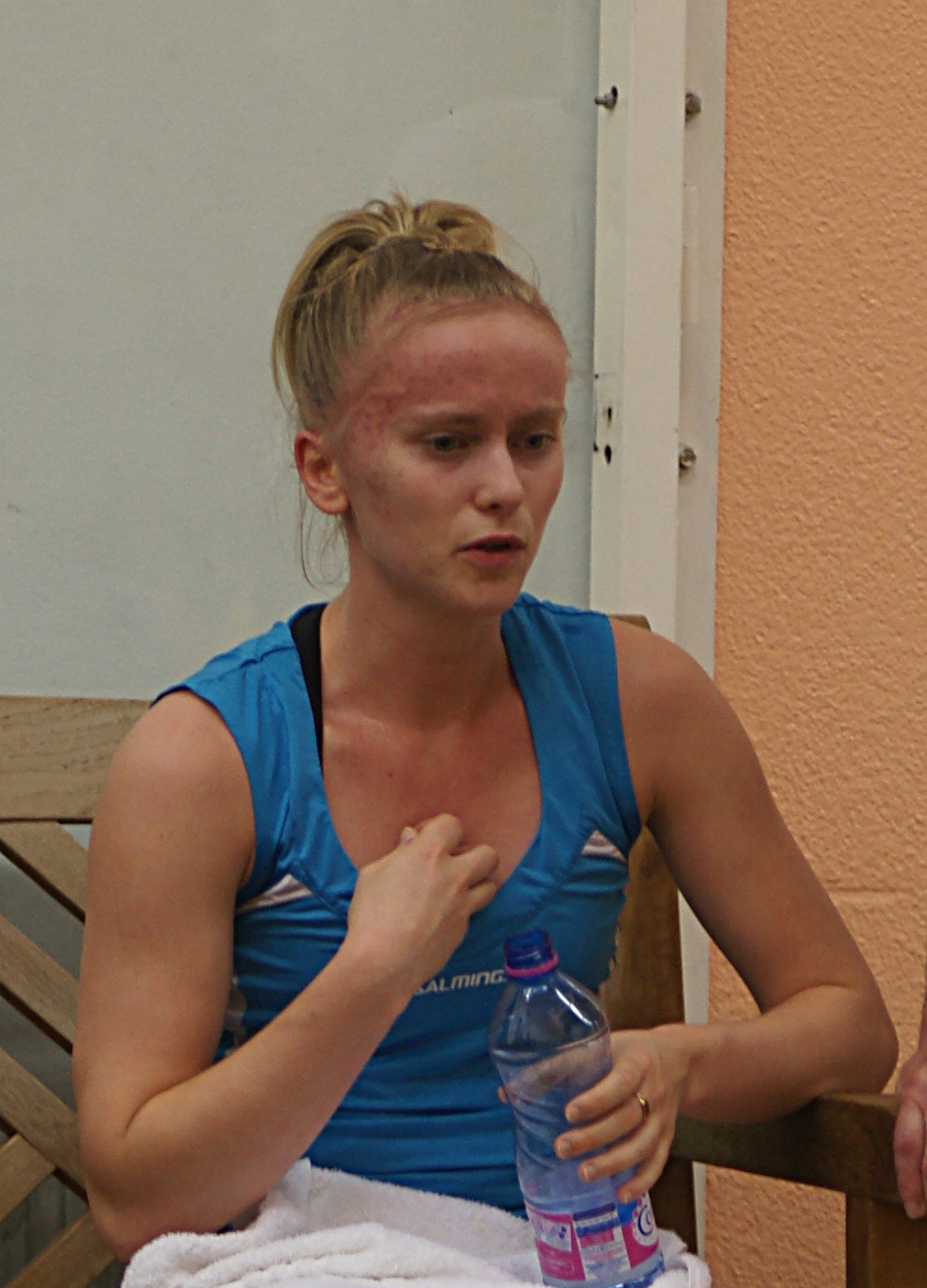
- Emily Whitlock, Monte-Carlo squash classic 2015

Personal information
- Nationality: British
- Born: 15 February 1994 (age 32) Macclesfield, England

Sport
- Handedness: Right Handed
- Coached by: Phil Whitlock
- Retired: Active
- Racquet used: Prince

Women's singles
- Highest ranking: No. 12 (November 2017)
- Current ranking: No. 49 (14 July 2025)
- Title: 4
- Tour final: 7
Medal record
European Team Championships
Silver medal – second place	2022 Eindhoven	Team
Bronze medal – third place	2023 Helsinki	Team
Bronze medal – third place	2024 Uster	Team

Emily Whitlock (born 15 February 1994) is an English-born professional squash player who represented Wales at the Commonwealth Games. She reached a career-high world ranking of World No. 12 in November 2017.

== Career ==
Whitlock made solid progress up the world rankings, capturing three successive titles at the start of 2012 and repeated the feat at the end of the year. Five titles followed in 2013 and 2014 before she lifted her first PSA Challenger 15 title at the Courtcare Open in May 2015. Her performances there did not go unnoticed and she joined the elite top 20 players in the world a month later.

Whitlock represented the Welsh team at the 2022 Commonwealth Games in Birmingham, England, where she participated in the women's singles and mixed doubles with Peter Creed. In the singles she reached the quarter-finals before being eliminated by Sarah-Jane Perry of England.
