= Fares Dessouky =

Egyptian squash player (born 1994)

Personal information
- Nickname: Fearless Fares
- Born: September 29, 1994 (age 31) Alexandria, Egypt
- Height: 5 ft 10 in (178 cm)
- Weight: 80 kg (180 lb)

Sport
- Country: Egypt
- Turned pro: 2011
- Coached by: Ahmed Effat; Samy Farrag
- Retired: Active
- Racquet used: tecnifibre carboflex 125

Men's singles
- Highest ranking: No. 7 (April 2021)
- Current ranking: No. 15 (14 July 2025)
- Title: 3

Fares Mohamed Dessouky (born 29 September 1994) is an Egyptian professional squash player who represented Egypt. He reached a career-high ranking of World No. 7 in April 2021.

== Biography ==
During the 2014 PSA World Series he reached the quarter-finals of the 2014 British Open, beating Karim Abdel Gawad 3–2 in the first round, Karim Darwish 3–2 in the second round before losing out to Nick Matthew 0–3 in the quarter-final match.

Dessouky won his biggest PSA title in December 2020 at the CIB Black Ball Open in Egypt, defeating Ali Farag in five games.

In March 2022, he won his 5th PSA title after securing victory in the Canary Wharf Squash Classic during the 2021–22 PSA World Tour.

== Titles and Finals ==
=== Major Finals (1) ===
Major tournaments include:

- PSA World Championships
- PSA World Tour Finals
- Top-tier PSA World Tour tournaments (Platinum/World Series/Super Series)

Year/Season	Tournament	Opponent	Result	Score
2021	Black Ball Open	Marwan El Shorbagy	Loss (1)	7-11 9-11 11-7 12–14

Sporting positions
Preceded by Karim Abdel Gawad	PSA Men's Young Player of the Year; 2014	Succeeded by Marwan El Shorbagy
