= Cameron Pilley =

Australian squash player (born 1982)

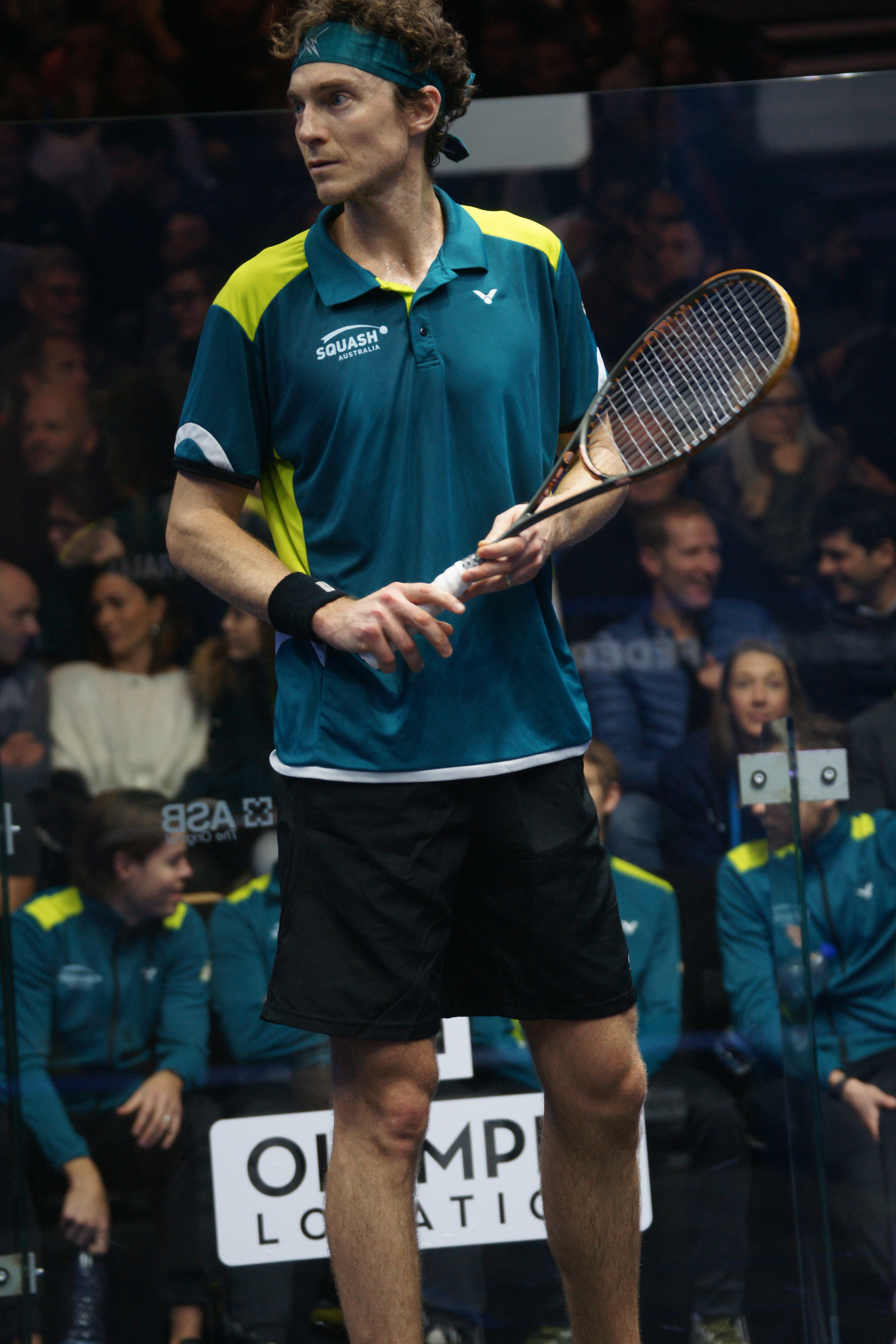
- Cameron Pilley at the 2017 Men's World Team Squash Championships

Personal information
- Born: 27 October 1982 (age 43) Yamba, New South Wales
- Height: 1.91 m (6 ft 3 in)
- Weight: 84 kg (185 lb)

Sport
- Country: Australia
- Handedness: Right Handed
- Turned pro: 2001
- Coached by: Dan Frogan
- Retired: December 2019
- Racquet used: Karakal T-120FF

Men's singles
- Highest ranking: No. 11 (January 2011)
- Title: 13
- Tour final: 27
Medal record
Men's squash
Representing Australia
World Team Championships
Silver medal – second place	2007 Chennai	Team
Bronze medal – third place	2009 Odense	Team
Bronze medal – third place	2011 Paderborn	Team
Bronze medal – third place	2017 Marseille	Team
World Doubles Championships
Gold medal – first place	2017 Manchester	Doubles
Gold medal – first place	2019 Carrara	Doubles
Gold medal – first place	2019 Carrara	Mixed doubles
Silver medal – second place	2006 Melbourne	Mixed doubles
Bronze medal – third place	2016 Darwin	Doubles
Commonwealth Games
Gold medal – first place	2010 Delhi	Mixed doubles
Gold medal – first place	2014 Glasgow	Doubles
Gold medal – first place	2018 Gold Coast	Mixed doubles
Bronze medal – third place	2010 New Delhi	Doubles
Bronze medal – third place	2014 Glasgow	Mixed doubles
Commonwealth Youth Games
Silver medal – second place	2000 Edinburgh	Team

Cameron Pilley (born 27 October 1982) is an Australian former professional squash player. He reached a career-high world ranking of World No. 11 in January 2011.

Pilley was born in Grafton, New South Wales. From 2001 to 2005, he attended the Australian Institute of Sport on a squash scholarship, where he trained under Geoff Hunt and Rodney Martin. He announced his retirement from professional squash on 27 December 2019.

== Career overview ==
As a junior player, Pilley won the Australian under-19 title twice and represented Australia in the World Junior Championships. In 2006, he finished runner-up in the mixed doubles event at the World Doubles Squash Championships, partnering with Amelia Pittock.

In 2008, he reached the final of the Canary Wharf Squash Classic, losing to James Willstrop in the final 9–11, 11–9, 8–11, 11–6, 11–3.

In November 2010, he won the Dutch Open against Laurens Jan Anjema in the final 11–7, 11–9, 11–13, 14–12.

On 3 October 2011, Pilley hit a squash ball recorded as 177 mph, breaking the previous record set by John White by 3 miles per hour.

In May 2016, he reached the PSA World Series Finals. He beat Mohamad El Shorbagy in the semi-finals by a score of 2–0. He lost to Grégory Gaultier in the finals 3–1 on 28 May 2016.

== Titles and Finals ==
=== Major Finals (2) ===
Major tournaments include:

- PSA World Championships
- PSA World Tour Finals
- Top-tier PSA World Tour tournaments (Platinum/World Series/Super Series)

Year/Season	Tournament	Opponent	Result	Score
2015	Hong Kong Open	Mohamed El Shorbagy	Loss (1)	8-11 6-11 8-11
2015-16	PSA World Series Finals	Grégory Gaultier	Loss (2)	4-11 5-11 11-8 6-11

== Commonwealth Games ==
Cameron Pilley is a three-time Commonwealth Games gold medallist for Australia. In Delhi in 2010 Pilley with Ryan Cuskelly won bronze in the men’s doubles, and gold in the mixed doubles with Kasey Brown. In Glasgow in 2014, Pilley and Brown won bronze in the mixed doubles, and he won a gold in the men’s doubles with David Palmer. In the Gold Coast games in 2018 he won gold with Donna Lobban in the mixed doubles.
