= Mathieu Castagnet =

French squash player (born 1986)

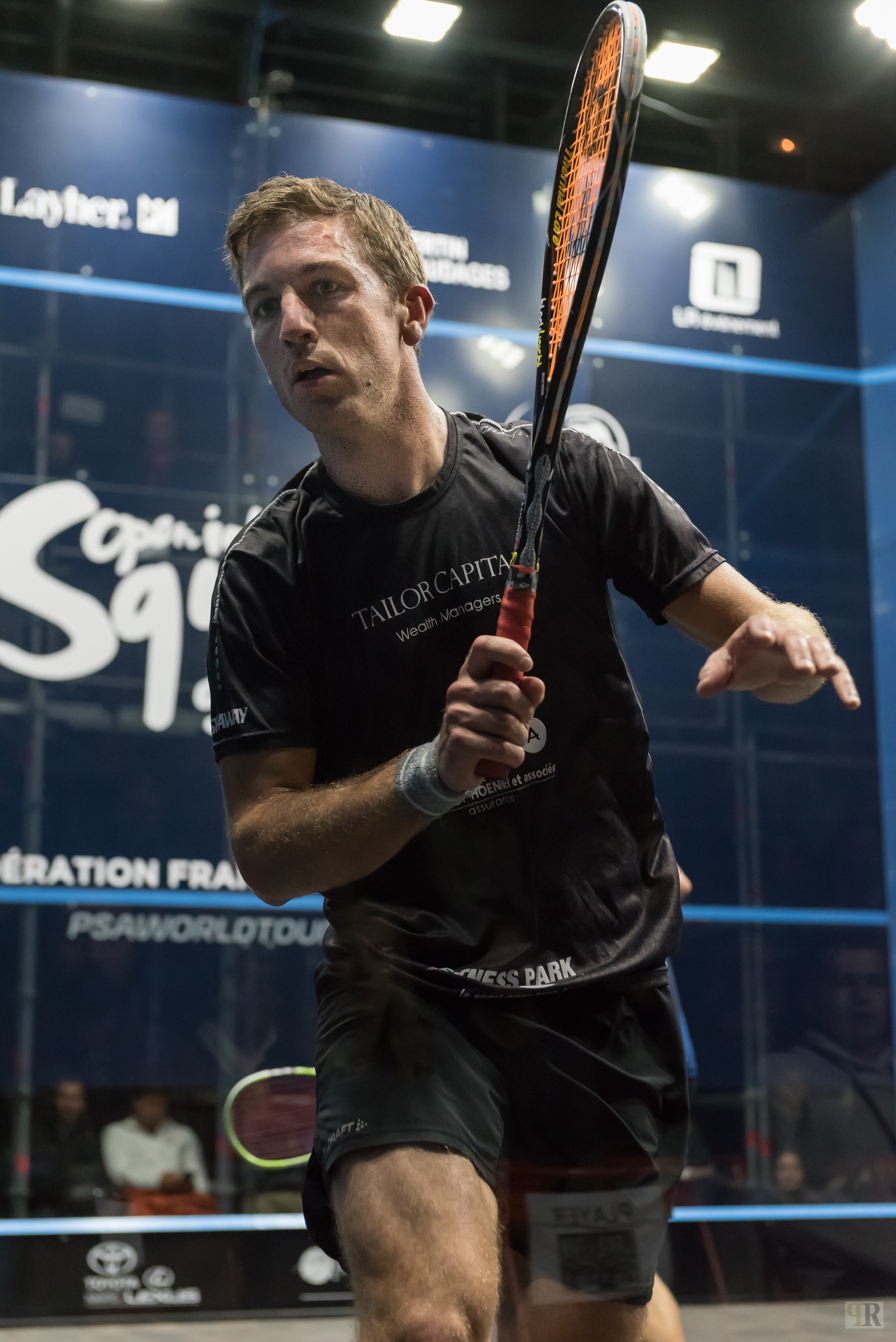

Personal information
- Nicknames: The French Warrior, The Musketeer
- Born: 14 November 1986 (age 39) Saintes, France
- Height: 1.79 m (5 ft 10 in)
- Weight: 79 kg (174 lb)
- Website: www.mathieucastagnet.com

Sport
- Country: France
- Turned pro: 2005
- Retired: 2022
- Racquet used: Black Knight

Men's singles
- Highest ranking: No. 6 (May 2016)
- Title: 4
- Tour final: 10
- World Open: Rnd 3
Medal record
Men's squash
Representing France
World Team Championships
Bronze medal – third place	2013 Mulhouse	Team
Bronze medal – third place	2019 Washington D.C.	Team
The World Games
Bronze medal – third place	2017 Wroclaw	Single
- Updated on December 2022

Mathieu Castagnet (born 14 November 1986) is a professional squash player who represented France. He reached a career-high world ranking of World No. 6 in May 2016.

He reached the quarterfinals of the US Open in 2013 and the quarterfinals of the British Open in 2014, and entered the world Top 20 in June 2014.

In December 2014, he beat the world number one Mohamed El Shorbagy in four games during the British Grand Prix 2014, where he reached the final against Nick Matthew.

In March 2016, he won in the Canary Wharf Classic beating the No. 1 seed Omar Mosaad in four games, the biggest achievement of his career.

In July 2017, he won the bronze medal at the 2017 World Games in Wrocław, Poland.
