= Marwan El Shorbagy =

Egyptian squash player (born 1993)

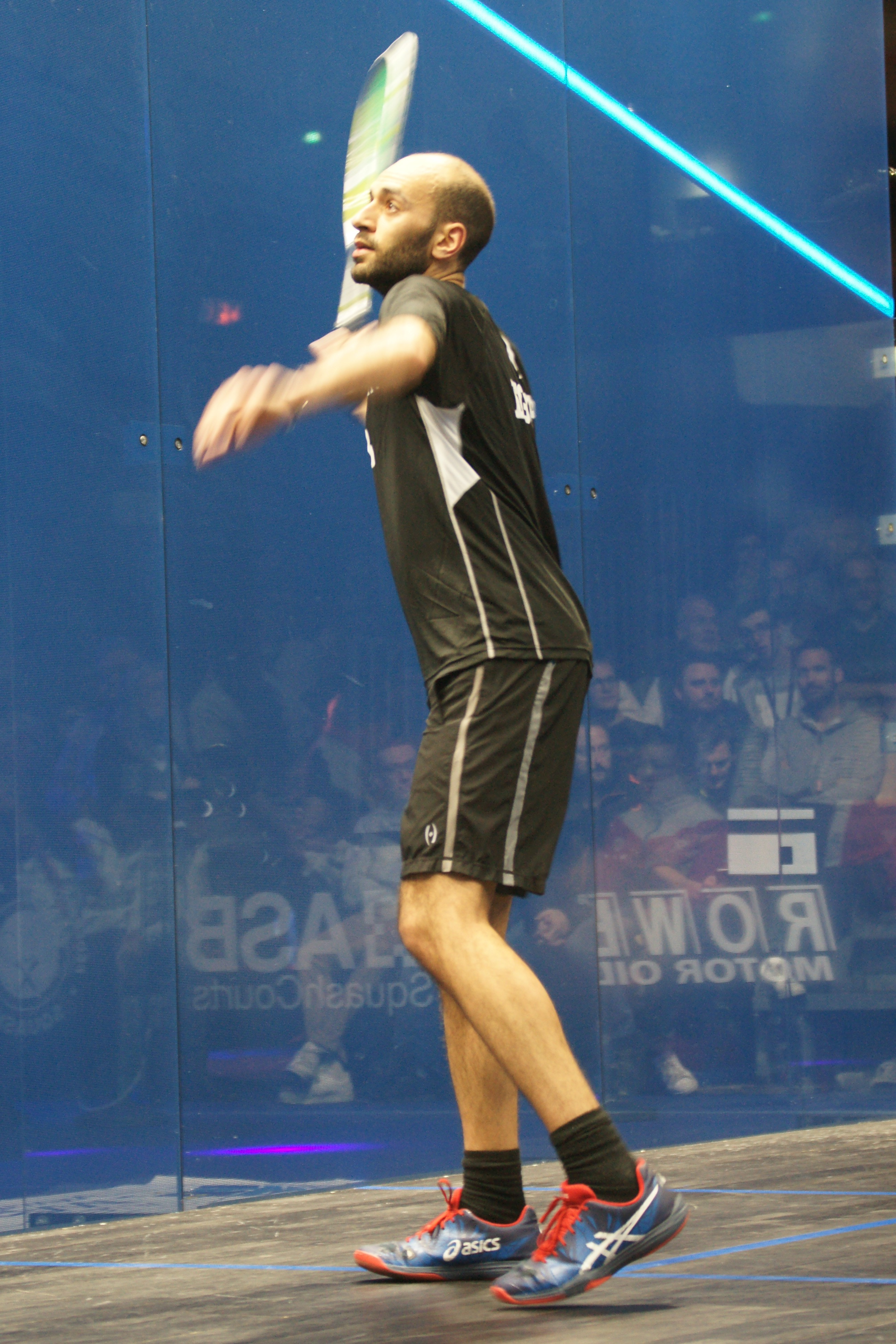

Personal information
- Nickname: The Jackal
- Born: July 30, 1993 (age 33) Alexandria, Egypt
- Height: 1.83 m (6 ft 0 in)
- Weight: 73 kg (161 lb)

Sport
- Country: England; Egypt
- Handedness: Right Handed
- Turned pro: 2010
- Coached by: Hadrian Stiff, Haitham Effat, Ian Thomas
- Retired: Active
- Racquet used: Tecnifibre Carboflex X-Top 130

Men's singles
- Highest ranking: No. 3 (May 2018)
- Current ranking: No. 8 (February 2026)
- Title: 17
Medal record
Men's squash
Representing Egypt
World Championships
Silver medal – second place	2017 Manchester	Singles
World Team Championships
Gold medal – first place	2017 Marseille	Team
Representing England
World Team Championships
Silver medal – second place	2023 Tauranga	Team
Silver medal – second place	2024 Hong Kong	Team
European Team Championships
Gold medal – first place	2025 Wrocław	Team
Gold medal – first place	2026 Amsterdam	Team

Marwan Hossam El Shorbagy (born 30 July 1993) is an Egyptian-English professional squash player. He is a former world team champion and reached his career-high ranking reaching World No. 3 in May 2018, while playing for his native Egypt. He won the World Juniors in 2011 & 2012 and became the third player in history to win the World Junior twice.

== Career overview ==
He was born and raised in the Egyptian city of Alexandria and started playing squash at the age of eight. In 2010, he joined the PSA as a 17-year-old and became a student at Millfield School in England (where he was coached by Jonah Barrington and Ian Thomas). He is the younger brother of Mohamed El Shorbagy who also plays on the PSA tour and is a former World No. 1.

Despite now combining his squash career with that of a student at a university in the UK, 19-year-old El Shorbagy celebrated his world top 30 debut in July. In July 2012 he won his second successive World Junior Open title – to become only the third man in history to win the world junior title for a second time. He is also the first player in history to win two individual and two teams world titles.

"I had never thought growing up that I would win a U19 British Open Junior title, or a World Junior title. And here I am. With two of each. And I feel so honored that I can add my name to the two prestigious ones that have 2 world junior titles, Ramy and my brother. It’s such an honour."

But it was in July 2011 that the youngster made his first major impact on the senior stage. After winning his first ever World Junior title in Herentals the 17-year-old, after qualifying, beat World No. 28 Aamir Atlas Khan in the quarter-finals of an international 25 event in Cairo, he then went to beat World No. 14 Omar Mosaad in the semis after a marathon match and then finally being stopped by another Egyptian Mohd Ali Anwar Reda losing 17–15 in the 5th.

It was in November 2011 that the 17-year-old made his first-ever appearance in the World Open, after qualifying the 17-year-old beat Pakistani Farhan Mehboob before upsetting 11th seed and former English national champion Daryl Selby 11–8, 11–7, 5–11, 4–11, 13–11 in 85 minutes and then finally being stopped in the last 16 round by the number three seed and current World number one James Willstrop.

He reached his first PSA Tour final at the Crocodile Cup in Hong Kong in October 2010 only his second appearance in a PSA tournament – then in April 2011 netted his first Tour title at the Aramex Open in Jordan.

After winning his 2nd British Open Junior title, El Shorbagy began his 2012 campaign in January in the US, after qualifying in his first ever appearance in the Tournament of Champions. The 18-year-old beat experienced Frenchman Thierry Lincou World Number ten in four games before upsetting World Number 18 Tom Richards 9-11 11-5 6-11 11-6 12–10 in 85 minutes to reach the quarter finals of a Super Series tournament for the first time and to become the first qualifier to reach the quarter finals of the ToC in 10 years.

"I am so happy with my performance in this tournament, I never expected to beat the top players at such a young age but now I have the confidence that I can, and I am hungry to go on court with the top player."

On 30 July 2023, ElShorbagy decided to change allegiance to represent the England team. In December 2023, El Shorbagy won a silver medal with England, at the 2023 Men's World Team Squash Championships in New Zealand.

After winning the 2024 European Team Championships in Switzerland and reaching the third round of the 2024 PSA Men's World Squash Championship in May, where he lost to his brother, he won another silver medal with England, at the December 2024 Men's World Team Squash Championships in Hong Kong.

In January 2025, El Shorbagy won his 15th PSA title after securing victory in Cleveland's Squash in the Land during the 2024–25 PSA Squash Tour and won a 16th title after securing victory in the Squash On Fire Open. In May 2025 he was part of the England team that won the gold medal at the 2025 European Squash Team Championships in Wrocław, Poland.

In January 2026, he won his 17th PSA title after securing victory in the Motor City Open during the 2025–26 PSA Squash Tour.

== Titles and Finals ==
=== Major Finals (7) ===
Major tournaments include:

- PSA World Championships
- PSA World Tour Finals
- Top-tier PSA World Tour tournaments (Platinum/World Series/Super Series)

Year/Season	Tournament	Opponent	Result	Score
2017	Windy City Open	Grégory Gaultier	Loss (1)	11-5 8-11 2-11 4–11
2017	PSA World Championships	Mohamed El Shorbagy	Loss (2)	5-11 11-9 7-11 11-9 6–11
2018	Windy City Open	Mohamed El Shorbagy	Loss (3)	8-11 8-11 6–11
2018	El Gouna International	Ali Farag	Win (1)	11-8 11-5 11–4
2019-20	PSA World Tour Finals	Karim Abdel Gawad	Win (2)	11-6 11-5 11–3
2021	Black Ball Open	Fares Dessouky	Win (3)	11-7 11-9 7-11 14–12
2023	Tournament of Champions	Diego Elías	Loss (4)	2-11 6-11 4–11

Sporting positions
Preceded by Nicolas Müller	PSA Young Player of the Year; 2012	Succeeded by Karim Abdel Gawad
