= Ryan Cuskelly =

Australian squash player (born 1987)

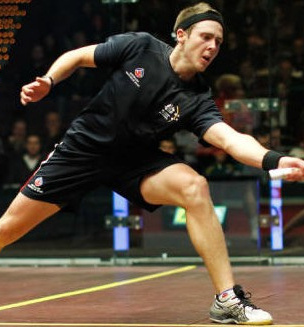
- Cuskelly during 2011 Australian Open

Personal information
- Born: 15 July 1987 (age 39) Lismore, New South Wales
- Height: 5 ft 11 in (1.80 m)
- Weight: 75 kg (165 lb)

Sport
- Country: Australia
- Handedness: Left Handed
- Turned pro: 2006
- Coached by: Rodney Martin
- Retired: January 2020
- Racquet used: Harrow

Men's singles
- Highest ranking: No. 12 (March 2017)
- Title: 8
- Tour final: 13
Medal record
Men's squash
Representing Australia
World Team Championships
Bronze medal – third place	2017 Marseille	Team
World Doubles Championships
Gold medal – first place	2017 Manchester	Doubles
Gold medal – first place	2019 Carrara	Doubles
Bronze medal – third place	2016 Darwin	Doubles
Commonwealth Games
Bronze medal – third place	2010 New Delhi	Doubles

Ryan Cuskelly (born 15 July 1987 in Lismore) is an Australian professional squash player. He reached a career-high world ranking of World No. 12 in March 2017. He reached his first semi-final of a World Series tournament in the 2015 Qatar Classic. On 11 January 2020 Cuskelly announced his retirement from professional squash.
