= 2003 Men's World Open Squash Championship =

Men's World Open 2003
- 25th PSA World Squash Championship
- Location: Lahore, Pakistan
- Date: December 14–21, 2003
- Website www.squashtalk.com/mensworld/2003/draw.htm

PSA World Tour
- Category: PSA World Open
- Prize money: $175,000

Results
- Champion: (Egypt) Amr Shabana
- Runner-up: (France) Thierry Lincou
- Semi-finalists: (Australia) Joseph Kneipp (Egypt) Karim Darwish

The 2003 PSA Men's World Open Squash Championship is the men's edition of the 2003 World Open, which serves as the individual world championship for squash players. The event took place in Lahore in Pakistan from 14 December to 21 December 2003. Amr Shabana won his first World Open title, defeating Thierry Lincou in the final.

== Seeds ==
1. (England) Peter Nicol (second round)
2. (Scotland) John White (third round)
3. (Australia) David Palmer (third round)
4. (France) Thierry Lincou (final)
5. (Australia) Anthony Ricketts (quarterfinals)
6. (Malaysia) Ong Beng Hee (second round)
7. (Egypt) Karim Darwish (semifinals)
8. (England) Lee Beachill (quarterfinals)
9. (Egypt) Amr Shabana (champion)
10. (France) Grégory Gaultier (third round)
11. (Australia) Joseph Kneipp (semifinals)
12. (Scotland) Martin Heath (first round)
13. (Pakistan) Mansoor Zaman (second round)
14. (Canada) Graham Ryding (second round)
15. (England) Simon Parke (second round)
16. (England) Mark Chaloner (second round)

== Draw and results ==
=== Finals ===
Quarter finals
30	(Italy) Davide Bianchetti	16	9	5
7	(Egypt) Karim Darwish	17	15	15
9	(Egypt) Amr Shabana	14	15	15	12	17
5	(Australia) Anthony Ricketts	15	14	12	15	16
19	(England) Nick Matthew	15	7	3	11
4	(France) Thierry Lincou	14	15	15	15
8	(England) Lee Beachill	15	10	8	15	10
11	(Australia) Joseph Kneipp	10	15	15	11	15

Semi finals
7	(Egypt) Karim Darwish	11	15	8	14
9	(Egypt) Amr Shabana	15	11	15	15
4	(France) Thierry Lincou	15	15	15
11	(Australia) Joseph Kneipp	12	10	7

Final
9	(Egypt) Amr Shabana	15	9	15	15
4	(France) Thierry Lincou	14	15	11	7

=== Top half ===
==== Section 1 ====
First round
1	(England) Peter Nicol	15	16	15	15
(Egypt) Hisham Ashour	14	17	7	6
30	(Italy) Davide Bianchetti	15	15	15
(Wales) Gavin Jones	8	11	13
10	(France) Grégory Gaultier	15	15	15
(England) Jonathan Kemp	11	8	4
26	(South Africa) Rodney Durbach	15	15	15
Q	(Australia) Raj Nanda	13	2	7
7	(Egypt) Karim Darwish	15	15	15
Q	(Pakistan) Safeerullah Khan	13	11	9
29	(England) James Willstrop	15	15	15
(England) Lee Drew	8	8	8
13	(Pakistan) Mansoor Zaman	15	15	15
(Switzerland) Lars Harms	11	5	9
21	(Finland) Olli Tuominen	15	15	15
(Australia) Cameron White	11	6	6

Second round
1	(England) Peter Nicol	15	15	7	4	10
30	(Italy) Davide Bianchetti	11	12	15	15	15
10	(France) Grégory Gaultier	15	5	15	10	15
26	(South Africa) Rodney Durbach	10	15	11	15	11
7	(Egypt) Karim Darwish	15	15	8	7	15
29	(England) James Willstrop	11	13	15	15	9
13	(Pakistan) Mansoor Zaman	15	10	8	15
21	(Finland) Olli Tuominen	11	15	15	17

Third round
30	(Italy) Davide Bianchetti	15	15	5	5	15
10	(France) Grégory Gaultier	12	14	15	15	7
7	(Egypt) Karim Darwish	15	15	5	7	15
21	(Finland) Olli Tuominen	8	8	15	15	10

Quarter finals
30	(Italy) Davide Bianchetti	16	9	5
7	(Egypt) Karim Darwish	17	15	15

==== Section 2 ====
First round
3	(Australia) David Palmer	15	15	15
(Egypt) Mohd Essam Hafiz	12	5	12
28	(Malaysia) Mohd Azlan Iskandar	15	15	15
(Australia) Glenn Keenan	3	6	8
9	(Egypt) Amr Shabana	15	15	15
(England) Bradley Ball	14	11	16
22	(England) Adrian Grant	16	13	15	5
(England) Peter Genever	17	15	4	15
5	(Australia) Anthony Ricketts	15	15	15
(Australia) Cameron Pilley	8	5	11
31	(Egypt) Wael El Hindi	15	15	15
(England) Alister Walker	9	12	12
15	(England) Simon Parke	15	15	15
(England) Ben Garner	13	16	14
20	(Egypt) Mohammed Abbas	15	15	9	15
(Canada) Viktor Berg	7	11	15	13

Second round
3	(Australia) David Palmer	15	15	15
28	(Malaysia) Mohd Azlan Iskandar	8	9	11
9	(Egypt) Amr Shabana	15	8	15	14	15
(England) Peter Genever	10	15	5	17	2
5	(Australia) Anthony Ricketts	15	15	15
31	(Egypt) Wael El Hindi	5	6	10
15	(England) Simon Parke	15	7	7	5
20	(Egypt) Mohammed Abbas	5	15	15	15

Third round
3	(Australia) David Palmer	6	9	15	7
9	(Egypt) Amr Shabana	15	15	11	15
5	(Australia) Anthony Ricketts	15	15	11	15
20	(Egypt) Mohammed Abbas	11	13	15	8

Quarter finals
9	(Egypt) Amr Shabana	14	15	15	12	17
5	(Australia) Anthony Ricketts	15	14	12	15	16

=== Bottom half ===
==== Section 1 ====
First round
(Australia) Dan Jenson	10	6	12
25	(France) Renan Lavigne	15	15	15
(Australia) Mike Corren	7	10	15	12
16	(England) Mark Chaloner	15	15	12	15
Q	(Pakistan) Saeed Hassan	11	10	11
19	(England) Nick Matthew	15	15	15
(Netherlands) Laurens Jan Anjema	9	7	4
6	(Malaysia) Ong Beng Hee	15	15	15
Q	(Pakistan) Arshad Iqbal Burki	15	3	10	17	15
24	(Canada) Shahier Razik	13	15	15	14	8
(Netherlands) Tommy Berden	17	15	16	15
12	(Scotland) Martin Heath	16	9	17	8
Q	(Pakistan) Shamsul Islam Khan	6	11	17	8
18	(Egypt) Omar El Borolossy	15	15	16	15
(Pakistan) Shahid Zaman	9	4	8
4	(France) Thierry Lincou	15	15	15

Second round
25	(France) Renan Lavigne	15	15	13	15
16	(England) Mark Chaloner	16	9	15	10
19	(England) Nick Matthew	15	10	3	15	15
6	(Malaysia) Ong Beng Hee	13	15	15	12	5
Q	(Pakistan) Arshad Iqbal Burki	15	15	6	13	9
(Netherlands) Tommy Berden	12	10	15	15	15
18	(Egypt) Omar El Borolossy	9	12	7
4	(France) Thierry Lincou	15	15	15

Third round
25	(France) Renan Lavigne	11	8	13
19	(England) Nick Matthew	15	15	15
(Netherlands) Tommy Berden	16	13	12
4	(France) Thierry Lincou	17	15	15

Quarter finals
19	(England) Nick Matthew	15	7	3	11
4	(France) Thierry Lincou	14	15	15	15

==== Section 2 ====
First round
(Australia) John Williams	13	12	11
23	(England) Nick Taylor	15	15	15
Q	(England) Peter Barker	15	7	13	11
14	(Canada) Graham Ryding	12	15	15	15
(Spain) Borja Golán	15	15	6	15
32	(Pakistan) Farrukh Zaman	13	6	15	7
Q	(India) Ritwik Bhattacharya	7	15	13	10
8	(England) Lee Beachill	15	10	15	15
(England) Joey Barrington	9	12	15	11
17	(Wales) Alex Gough	15	15	12	15
(Republic of Ireland) Liam Kenny	8	11	9
11	(Australia) Joseph Kneipp	15	15	15
Q	(Republic of Ireland) John Rooney	9
27	(Belgium) Stefan Casteleyn	3
(France) Jean-Michel Arcucci	11	12	13
2	(Scotland) John White	15	15	15

Second round
23	(England) Nick Taylor	15	15	15
14	(Canada) Graham Ryding	12	6	9
(Spain) Borja Golán	5	7	6
8	(England) Lee Beachill	15	15	15
17	(Wales) Alex Gough	7	12	15	7
11	(Australia) Joseph Kneipp	15	15	10	15
Q	(Republic of Ireland) John Rooney	13	6	12
2	(Scotland) John White	15	15	15

Third round
23	(England) Nick Taylor	7	7	6
8	(England) Lee Beachill	15	15	15
11	(Australia) Joseph Kneipp	15	15	15
2	(Scotland) John White	11	14	3

Quarter finals
8	(England) Lee Beachill	15	10	8	15	10
11	(Australia) Joseph Kneipp	10	15	15	11	15

== See also ==
- PSA World Open
- 2003 Women's World Open Squash Championship

Preceded by Belgium (Antwerp); 2002	PSA World Open; Pakistan (Lahore); 2003	Succeeded by Qatar (Doha); 2004
