= 2006 Men's British Open Squash Championship =

British Open Squash Championships
- 68th British Open Championships

Details
- Location: Nottingham, England
- Venue: University of Nottingham
- Dates: 4–19 November 2006

The 2006 Dunlop British Open Championships was held at the University of Nottingham from 14–19 November 2006.
Nick Matthew won the title defeating Thierry Lincou in the final.

== Seeds ==
1. (Egypt) Amr Shabana
2. (Australia) David Palmer
3. (France) Thierry Lincou
4. (England) James Willstrop
5. (Australia) Anthony Ricketts
6. (England) Nick Matthew
7. (France) Grégory Gaultier
8. (Egypt) Karim Darwish

== Draw and results ==
=== First qualifying round ===
Player One	Player Two	Score
(Malaysia) Ong Beng Hee	(Canada) Shawn Delierre	11-8 11-4 11-4
(Egypt) Mohammed Abbas	(England) Laurence Delasaux	11-3 11-3 11-6
(England) Peter Barker	(England) Tom Richards	11-6 11-7 11-6
(Australia) Stewart Boswell	(England) Alex Stait	11-7 11-7 5-11 11-3
(Italy) Davide Bianchetti	(England) Tom Pashley	11-8 11-4 11-3
(Netherlands) Laurens Jan Anjema	(Wales) Jethro Binns	11-4 11-5 11-3
(England) Adrian Grant	(South Africa) Shaun le Roux	11-4 11-2 11-5
(England) Simon Parke	(England) Scott Handley	11-5 11-7 11-5
(Australia) Joseph Kneipp	(England) Andrew Whipp	11-6 11-9 10-11 11-7
(Pakistan) Mansoor Zaman	(England) Joe Lee	11-2 11-2 11-4
(England) Lee Drew	(Pakistan) Shahid Zaman	11-2 8-11 11-10 11-9
(Pakistan) Aamir Atlas Khan	(Egypt) Wael El Hindi	7-11 8-11 11-10 11-10 11-7
(England) Alister Walker	(England) Jonathan Harford	11-2 4-11 11-3 11-1
(England) Joey Barrington	(Zimbabwe) Jesse Engelbrecht	11-8 11-9 11-7
(Wales) Alex Gough	(England) Bradley Ball	11-6 11-5 11-10
(England) Daryl Selby	(England) Stacey Ross	2-0 ret

=== Second qualifying round ===
Player One	Player Two	Score
(Malaysia) Ong Beng Hee	(England) Simon Parke	11-7 11-7 11-8
(Egypt) Mohammed Abbas	(Australia) Joseph Kneipp	11-6 11-7 11-5
(England) Peter Barker	(Pakistan) Mansoor Zaman	11-9 11-7 11-4
(Australia) Stewart Boswell	(England) Lee Drew	11-5 11-3 11-7
(Italy) Davide Bianchetti	(Pakistan) Aamir Atlas Khan	11-6 11-7 6-11 10-11 11-4
(Netherlands) Laurens Jan Anjema	(England) Alister Walker	11-5 7-11 11-9 11-10
(England) Adrian Grant	(England) Joey Barrington	11-10 11-5 8-11 11-8
(Wales) Alex Gough	(England) Daryl Selby	11-1 11-1 ret

=== Final qualifying round ===
Player One	Player Two	Score
(Malaysia) Ong Beng Hee	(Italy) Davide Bianchetti	11-10 11-6 10-11 11-5
(Egypt) Mohammed Abbas	(Netherlands) Laurens Jan Anjema	11-7 11-5 11-9
(England) Peter Barker	(England) Adrian Grant	11-6 11-10 2-11 2-11 11-7
(Australia) Stewart Boswell	(Wales) Alex Gough	11-7 11-5 10-11 4-11 11-4

=== Main draw ===
First round
1	(Egypt) Amr Shabana	7	15	11	10	5
(Scotland) John White	11	13	9	12	11
Q	(England) Peter Barker	8	11	4	5
8	(Egypt) Karim Darwish	11	9	11	11
6	(England) Nick Matthew	11	11	11
Q	(Australia) Stewart Boswell	7	4	7
(Malaysia) Mohd Azlan Iskandar	4	10	11	8
4	(England) James Willstrop	11	12	8	11
3	(France) Thierry Lincou	5	11	11	13
(England) Lee Beachill	11	7	5	11
Q	(Egypt) Mohammed Abbas	6	3	10
7	(France) Grégory Gaultier	11	11	12
5	(Australia) Anthony Ricketts	10	10	8
Q	(Malaysia) Ong Beng Hee	12	12	11
WC	(England) Chris Simpson	5	1	4
2	(Australia) David Palmer	11	11	11

Quarter-finals
(Scotland) White	11	11	8	8	4
8	(Egypt) Darwish	6	9	11	11	11
6	(England) Matthew	11	11
4	(England) Willstrop	7	5	r
3	(France) Lincou	11	5	9	11	11
7	(France) Gaultier	1	11	11	7	6
Q	(Malaysia) Beng Hee	9	10	6
2	(Australia) Palmer	11	12	11

Semi-finals
8	(Egypt) Darwish	9	11	6	6
6	(England) Matthew	11	9	11	11
3	(France) Lincou	8	10	11	11	15
2	(Australia) Palmer	11	12	9	4	13

Final
6	(England) Matthew	11	5	11	9	11
3	(France) Lincou	8	11	4	11	6

Preceded by 2005	British Open Squash Championships; England (Nottingham); 2006	Succeeded by 2007
