= 2015 in squash sport =

This article lists the results for the sport of Squash in 2015.

== International squash events ==
- March 28 – April 5: 2015 European Junior Squash Championships (U19) in (Czech Republic) Prague
  - Men's winner: (England) George Parker
  - Women's winner: (England) Georgina Kennedy
  - Team winners: England
- May 14 – 17: 2015 European Junior U15 & U17 Team Championships in (Portugal) Lisbon
  - U15 and U17 team winners: England
- May 27 – 30: 2015 European Squash Individual Championships in (Slovakia) Bratislava
  - Men: (France) Grégory Gaultier defeated (Spain) Borja Golán 11–3, 5–11, 11–7, 11–5, to win his third consecutive and his ninth overall European Squash Individual Championships title. (Germany) Raphael Kandra took third place.
  - Women: (France) Camille Serme defeated (Denmark) Line Hansen 12–10, 11–6, 11–6, to win her fourth consecutive European Squash Individual Championships title. (France) Coline Aumard took third place.
- July 31 – August 4: 2015 Women's World Junior Team Squash Championships in Cairo
  - Egypt defeated the United States, 2–0 in matches played, to win their sixth Women's World Junior Team Squash Championships title. England and Malaysia shared third place each.
- August 27 – 30: 2015 European Masters Individual Championships in (Sweden) Malmö
  - For results, click here.
- September 16 – 19: 2015 European Club Championships in (Poland) Kraków
  - Men: Team (Germany) Black & White Worms defeated fellow German club, Paderborner, 7–6 in games countback and after a 2–2 score in regular play, in the final. Team (France) Mulhouse took third place.
  - Women: Team (France) US Créteil defeated fellow French club, Mulhouse, 3–1 in matches played, in the final. Team (Germany) Paderborner took third place.
- December 12 – 18: 2015 Men's World Team Squash Championships in (Egypt) Cairo
  - Event postponed, due to national security concerns.

== 2015 PSA World Series ==
=== Men ===
- January 16 – 23: Tournament of Champions 2015 in (United States) New York City
  - (Egypt) Mohamed El Shorbagy defeated (England) Nick Matthew 5–11, 11–9, 11–8, 12–10, to win his first Tournament of Champions title.
- February 26 – March 4: Windy City Open 2015 in (United States) Chicago
  - (England) Nick Matthew defeated (Egypt) Mohamed El Shorbagy 11–7, 11–2, 11–7, to win his second Windy City Open title.
- April 5 – 10: El Gouna International 2015 in Egypt
  - (Egypt) Ramy Ashour defeated fellow Egyptian, Mohamed El Shorbagy, 11–9, 11–6, 4–11, 10–12, 12–10, to win his third El Gouna International title.
- May 13 – 17: 2015 Men's British Open in (England) Kingston upon Hull
  - (Egypt) Mohamed El Shorbagy defeated (France) Grégory Gaultier 11–9, 6–11, 5–11, 11–8, 11–5, to win his first Men's British Open title.
- October 10 – 17: US Open 2015 in (United States) Philadelphia
  - (France) Grégory Gaultier defeated (Egypt) Omar Mosaad 11–6, 11–3, 11–5, to win his third US Open title.
- October 31 – November 6: Men's Qatar Classic 2015 in Doha
  - (Egypt) Mohamed El Shorbagy defeated (France) Grégory Gaultier 11–5, 11–7, 5–11, 12–10, to win his second Men's Qatar Classic title.
- December 1 – 6: Hong Kong Open in Hong Kong
  - (Egypt) Mohamed El Shorbagy defeated (Australia) Cameron Pilley 11–8, 11–6, 11–8, to win his second consecutive Hong Kong Open title.

=== Women ===
- February 26 – March 4: Women's Windy City Open 2015 in (United States) Chicago
  - (Egypt) Raneem El Weleily defeated (Malaysia) Nicol David 14–16, 12–10, 11–7, 11–7, to win her first Women's Windy City Open title.
- May 10 – 17: 2015 Women's British Open Squash Championship in (United Kingdom) Kingston upon Hull
  - (France) Camille Serme defeated (England) Laura Massaro 11–3, 11–5, 8–11, 11–8, to win her first Women's British Open Squash Championship title.
- October 10 – 17: Women's United States Open (squash) 2015 in Philadelphia
  - (England) Laura Massaro defeated (Egypt) Nour El Tayeb 11–6, 9–11, 6–11, 11–8, 11–7, to win her second Women's United States Open title.
- October 31 – November 6: Women's Qatar Classic 2015 in Doha
  - (England) Laura Massaro defeated (Egypt) Nour El Sherbini 11–8, 12–14, 11–9, 8–11, 11–9, to win her first Women's Qatar Classic title.
- December 1 – 6: Women's Hong Kong squash Open 2015 in Hong Kong
  - (Malaysia) Nicol David defeated (England) Laura Massaro 15–13, 11–9, 11–3, to win her tenth consecutive Women's Hong Kong Squash Open title.
- December 11 – 18: 2015 Women's World Open Squash Championship in (Malaysia) Kuala Lumpur
  - Event cancelled, due to conflicting allegations of internal blackmailing between organizers and the federal government.
