= 2002 Men's World Open Squash Championship =

Men's World Open 2002
- 24th PSA World Squash Championship
- Location: Antwerp, Belgium
- Date: December 6–14, 2002
- Website www.squashtalk.com/mensworld/2002/draw.htm

PSA World Tour
- Category: PSA World Open
- Prize money: $155,000

Results
- Champion: (Australia) David Palmer
- Runner-up: (Scotland) John White
- Semi-finalists: (England) Peter Nicol (Canada) Jonathon Power

The 2002 PSA Men's World Open Squash Championship is the men's edition of the 2002 World Open, which serves as the individual world championship for squash players. The event took place in Antwerp in Belgium from 6 December to 14 December 2002. David Palmer won his first World Open title, defeating John White in the final.

== Seeds ==
1. (England) Peter Nicol (semifinals)
2. (Canada) Jonathon Power (semifinals)
3. (Australia) David Palmer (champion)
4. (Australia) Stewart Boswell (third round)
5. (Scotland) John White (final)
6. (France) Thierry Lincou (quarterfinals)
7. (Malaysia) Ong Beng Hee (third round)
8. (England) Lee Beachill (third round)
9. (Australia) Anthony Ricketts (quarterfinals)
10. (England) Mark Chaloner (third round)
11. (Scotland) Martin Heath (quarterfinals)
12. (Egypt) Karim Darwish (third round)
13. (Australia) Joseph Kneipp (second round)
14. (England) Chris Walker (third round)
15. (Egypt) Amr Shabana (third round)
16. (Wales) Alex Gough (second round)

== Draw and results ==
=== Finals ===
Quarter finals
1	(England) Peter Nicol	12	15	11	15	15
9	(Australia) Anthony Ricketts	15	11	15	10	8
26	(England) Simon Parke	15	10	6	7
5	(Scotland) John White	15	15	15	15
8	(England) Lee Beachill	9	11	10
3	(Australia) David Palmer	15	15	15
6	(France) Thierry Lincou	8	14	8
2	(Canada) Jonathon Power	15	15	15

Semi finals
1	(England) Peter Nicol	9	7	10
5	(Scotland) John White	15	15	15
3	(Australia) David Palmer	13	10
2	(Canada) Jonathon Power	15	10	rtd

Final
5	(Scotland) John White	15	15	6	14	11
3	(Australia) David Palmer	13	12	15	15	15

=== Top half ===
==== Section 1 ====
First round
1	(England) Peter Nicol	15	15	15
Q	(Wales) Gavin Jones	4	8	7
(Republic of Ireland) Derek Ryan	11	13	7
Q	(Italy) Davide Bianchetti	15	15	15
16	(Wales) Alex Gough	15	12	15	15
(England) Lee Drew	11	15	5	12
21	(Pakistan) Mansoor Zaman	15	13	10	15	10
(England) Scott Handley	6	15	15	13	5
7	(Malaysia) Ong Beng Hee	15	15	15
(Denmark) Mikkel Korsbjerg	7	11	13
30	(Egypt) Wael El Hindi	15	13	15	9	15
(Netherlands) Tommy Berden	12	15	12	15	8
9	(Australia) Anthony Ricketts	15	15	15
(France) Jean-Michel Arcucci	5	10	9
32	(England) Nick Matthew	15	17	15
(England) Peter Genever	2	16	11

Second round
1	(England) Peter Nicol	15	15	15
Q	(Italy) Davide Bianchetti	4	8	7
16	(Wales) Alex Gough	4	17	15	14	7
21	(Pakistan) Mansoor Zaman	15	16	12	17	15
7	(Malaysia) Ong Beng Hee	17	10	9	15	15
30	(Egypt) Wael El Hindi	14	15	15	4	10
9	(Australia) Anthony Ricketts	15	15	15
32	(England) Nick Matthew	10	13	5

Third round
1	(England) Peter Nicol	15	15	15
21	(Pakistan) Mansoor Zaman	8	8	11
7	(Malaysia) Ong Beng Hee	8	8	5
9	(Australia) Anthony Ricketts	15	15	15

Quarter finals
1	(England) Peter Nicol	12	15	11	15	15
9	(Australia) Anthony Ricketts	15	12	15	10	8

==== Section 2 ====
First round
4	(Australia) Stewart Boswell	15	15	15
(Egypt) Mohammed Abbas	6	1	6
28	(Pakistan) Shahid Zaman	17	15	15
(Republic of Ireland) Liam Kenny	14	7	6
13	(Australia) Joseph Kneipp	15	15	15
(Australia) John Williams	9	7	11
26	(England) Simon Parke	15	15	17
Q	(Czech Republic) Jan Koukal	11	7	15
5	(Scotland) John White	15	15	15
Q	(England) Alex Stait	6	8	9
24	(Belgium) Stefan Casteleyn	15	8	15	15
Q	(England) Ben Howell	10	15	7	11
10	(England) Mark Chaloner	15	17	15
(Egypt) Mohd Essam Hafiz	10	15	9
17	(England) Nick Taylor	15	15	11	7	15
(Switzerland) Lars Harms	6	9	15	15	11

Second round
4	(Australia) Stewart Boswell	15	15	15
28	(Pakistan) Shahid Zaman	7	9	4
13	(Australia) Joseph Kneipp	15	15	7	15	11
26	(England) Simon Parke	9	17	15	13	15
5	(Scotland) John White	17	15	15
24	(Belgium) Stefan Casteleyn	15	10	12
10	(England) Mark Chaloner	17	15	15
17	(England) Nick Taylor	15	9	10

Third round
4	(Australia) Stewart Boswell	7	15	5	17	12
26	(England) Simon Parke	15	13	15	15	15
5	(Scotland) John White	15	15	10	15
10	(England) Mark Chaloner	9	13	15	9

Quarter finals
26	(England) Simon Parke	17	10	6	7
5	(Scotland) John White	15	15	15	15

=== Bottom half ===
==== Section 1 ====
First round
(Australia) Cameron White	7	2	14
18	(Finland) Olli Tuominen	15	15	17
Q	(Australia) Cameron Pilley	7	15	6	7
11	(Scotland) Martin Heath	15	9	15	15
(Canada) Viktor Berg	15	7	15	15
20	(France) Renan Lavigne	12	15	13	13
(Pakistan) Ajaz Azmat	6	4	8
8	(England) Lee Beachill	15	15	15
(South Africa) Rodney Durbach	17	15	13	12	5
23	(Canada) Graham Ryding	14	10	15	15	15
(England) Ben Garner	11	9	10
15	(Egypt) Amr Shabana	15	15	15
(Finland) Mika Monto	10	15	5	7
29	(Wales) David Evans	15	11	15	15
(Canada) Shahier Razik	7	4	12
3	(Australia) David Palmer	15	15	15

Second round
18	(Finland) Olli Tuominen	15	15	9	5	13
11	(Scotland) Martin Heath	9	12	15	15	15
(Canada) Viktor Berg	9	6	2
8	(England) Lee Beachill	15	15	15
23	(Canada) Graham Ryding	12	13	11
15	(Egypt) Amr Shabana	15	15	15
29	(Wales) David Evans	15	12	15	7	12
3	(Australia) David Palmer	13	15	8	15	15

Third round
11	(Scotland) Martin Heath	10	15	12	1
8	(England) Lee Beachill	15	6	15	7
15	(Egypt) Amr Shabana	15	11	3	11
3	(Australia) David Palmer	6	15	15	15

Quarter finals
8	(England) Lee Beachill	9	11	10
3	(Australia) David Palmer	15	15	15

==== Section 2 ====
First round
(Malaysia) Mohd Azlan Iskandar	wo
31	(England) Stephen Meads
(England) Jonathan Kemp	11	13	3
12	(Egypt) Karim Darwish	15	15	15
(England) Bradley Ball	10	15	3	8
22	(Egypt) Omar El Borolossy	15	10	15	15
(England) Andrew Whipp	12	9	11
6	(France) Thierry Lincou	15	15	15
(England) Del Harris	15	10	2	15	8
26	(France) Grégory Gaultier	12	15	15	9	15
(Australia) Mike Corren	13	9	9
14	(England) Chris Walker	15	15	15
(England) Tim Garner	15	15	15
(Australia) Glenn Keenan	6	14	6
(Pakistan) Farrukh Zaman	8	10	5
2	(Canada) Jonathon Power	15	15	15

Second round
31	(England) Stephen Meads	15	9	8	4
12	(Egypt) Karim Darwish	8	15	15	15
22	(Egypt) Omar El Borolossy	12	15	10	11
6	(France) Thierry Lincou	15	13	15	15
26	(France) Grégory Gaultier	17	8	4	15	8
14	(England) Chris Walker	14	15	15	5	15
(England) Tim Garner	4	3	4
2	(Canada) Jonathon Power	15	15	15

Third round
12	(Egypt) Karim Darwish	9	15	6	12
6	(France) Thierry Lincou	15	3	15	15
14	(England) Chris Walker	15	5	3	7
2	(Canada) Jonathon Power	12	15	15	15

Quarter finals
6	(France) Thierry Lincou	8	14	8
2	(Canada) Jonathon Power	15	15	15

== See also ==
- PSA World Open
- 2002 Women's World Open Squash Championship

Preceded by Egypt (Cairo); 1999	PSA World Open; Antwerp (Belgium); 2002	Succeeded by Pakistan (Lahore); 2003
