= 2005 Men's British Open Squash Championship =

British Open Squash Championships
- 67th British Open Championships

Details
- Location: Manchester, England
- Venue: National Squash Centre
- Dates: 9–17 October 2005

The 2005 Dunlop British Open Championships was held at the National Squash Centre from 9–17 October 2005.
Anthony Ricketts won the title defeating James Willstrop in the final.

== Seeds ==
1. (France) Thierry Lincou
2. (England) Lee Beachill
3. (Australia) David Palmer
4. (Canada) Jonathon Power
5. (England) Peter Nicol
6. (Australia) Anthony Ricketts
7. (England) James Willstrop
8. (Scotland) John White
9. (France) Grégory Gaultier
10. (Canada) Graham Ryding
11. (England) Adrian Grant
12. (Australia) Joseph Kneipp
13. (Finland) Olli Tuominen
14. (Pakistan) Shahid Zaman
15. (Malaysia) Ong Beng Hee
16. (Pakistan) Mansoor Zaman

== Draw and results ==
=== Main draw ===
First round
1	(France) Thierry Lincou	11	11	11
Q	(England) Stacey Ross	8	8	5
(Wales) Alex Gough	4	11	11	11
12	(Australia) Joseph Kneipp	11	1	6	5
14	(Pakistan) Shahid Zaman	11	8	11	5	11
Q	(England) Ben Garner	9	11	3	11	6
WC	(England) Laurence Delasaux	6	6	2
5	(England) Peter Nicol	11	11	11
6	(Australia) Anthony Ricketts	11	11	11
Q	(South Africa) Rodney Durbach	9	8	3
(England) Peter Barker	9	9	6
10	(Canada) Graham Ryding	11	11	11
15	(Malaysia) Ong Beng Hee	6	11	11	11
(England) Simon Parke	11	8	8	5
(England) Joey Barrington	12	11	3	8
3	(Australia) David Palmer	14	8	11	11
4	(Canada) Jonathon Power	11	11	11
(Australia) Cameron Pilley	3	2	2
(England) Mark Chaloner	8	6	6
9	(France) Grégory Gaultier	11	11	11
13	(Finland) Olli Tuominen	4	11	11	6	6
Q	(England) Alister Walker	11	9	7	11	11
Q	(India) Saurav Ghosal	6	7	2
8	(Scotland) John White	11	11	11
7	(England) James Willstrop	11	11	11
(Netherlands) Laurens Jan Anjema	7	5	7
Q	(Italy) Davide Bianchetti	10	11	10	0	r
11	(England) Adrian Grant	11	10	11	8
16	(Pakistan) Mansoor Zaman	2	8	2
Q	(Australia) Stewart Boswell	11	11	11
Q	(England) Phillip Barker	8	9	2
2	(England) Lee Beachill	11	11	11

Second round
1	(France) Lincou	8	11	13	11
(Wales) Gough	11	4	11	3
14	(Pakistan) Zaman	7	6	11
5	(England) Nicol	11	11	13
6	(Australia) Ricketts	11	6	11	11
10	(Canada) Ryding	7	11	6	6
15	(Malaysia) Beng Hee	11	4	11	8	11
3	(Australia) Palmer	7	11	6	11	9
4	(Canada) Power	11	7	7	11	11
9	(France) Gaultier	4	11	11	1	6
Q	(England) Walker	11	8	6	9
8	(Scotland) White	8	11	11	11
7	(England) Willstrop	11	11	11	11
11	(England) Grant	13	6	6	8
Q	(Australia) Boswell	6	11	11	5	11
2	(England) Beachill	11	8	8	11	6

Quarter-finals
1	(France) Lincou	6	11	7	7
5	(England) Nicol	11	8	11	11
6	(Australia) Ricketts	11	11	11
15	(Malaysia) Beng Hee	2	8	5
4	(Canada) Power	11	11	11
8	(Scotland) White	4	6	4
7	(England) Willstrop	11	11	11	11
Q	(Australia) Boswell	13	8	5	4

Semi-finals
5	(England) Nicol	11	7	11	2	10
6	(Australia) Ricketts	9	11	7	11	12
Final
6	(Australia) Ricketts	11	11	11
7	(England) Willstrop	7	9	7
4	(Canada) Power	11	10	11	6	7
7	(England) Willstrop	5	12	3	11	11

Preceded by 2004	British Open Squash Championships; England (Manchester); 2005	Succeeded by 2006
