= 2008 Men's British Open Squash Championship =

British Open Squash Championships
- 70th British Open Championships

Details
- Location: Liverpool, England
- Venue: Echo Arena Liverpool
- Dates: 6–12 May 2008

The 2008 Dunlop British Open Championships was held at the Echo Arena Liverpool from 6–12 May 2008.
David Palmer won his fourth British Open career title by defeating James Willstrop in the final.

== Seeds ==
1. (Egypt) Amr Shabana
2. (Egypt) Ramy Ashour
3. (France) Grégory Gaultier
4. (England) James Willstrop
5. (Australia) David Palmer
6. (France) Thierry Lincou
7. (Egypt) Karim Darwish
8. (England) Peter Barker
9. (England) Lee Beachill
10. (Malaysia) Ong Beng Hee
11. (Malaysia) Mohd Azlan Iskandar
12. (England) Adrian Grant
13. (Scotland) John White
14. (Finland) Olli Tuominen
15. (Netherlands) Laurens Jan Anjema
16. (Wales) Alex Gough

== Draw and results ==
=== Main draw ===
First round
1	(Egypt) Amr Shabana	11	11	11
(Italy) Davide Bianchetti	5	8	5
Q	(Australia) Aaron Frankcomb	4	7	5
13	(Scotland) John White	11	11	11
5	(Australia) David Palmer	11	11	11
Q	(Egypt) Mohd Nafiizwan Adnan	3	5	6
Q	(England) Tom Richards	10	2	11	9
12	(England) Adrian Grant	12	11	4	11
3	(France) Grégory Gaultier	11	11	11
(Pakistan) Mansoor Zaman	8	3	8
(England) Joey Barrington	11	5	9	11	7
14	(Finland) Olli Tuominen	9	11	11	3	11
7	(Egypt) Karim Darwish	13	11	11
(England) Jonathan Kemp	11	8	7
Q	(South Africa) Jesse Engelbrecht	6	11	6	2
15	(Netherlands) Laurens Jan Anjema	11	4	11	11
9	(England) Lee Beachill	11	11	11
(England) Daryl Selby	8	4	5
WC	(England) Tom Pashley	4	9	8
8	(England) Peter Barker	11	11	11
10	(Malaysia) Ong Beng Hee	11	7	11	11
Q	(Pakistan) Farhan Mehboob	5	11	8	2
(Pakistan) Aamir Atlas Khan	5	11	8	2
4	(England) James Willstrop	11	7	11	11
16	(Wales) Alex Gough	6	11	11	0	11
Q	(Australia) Scott Arnold	11	1	1	11	9
Q	(England) Jonathan Harford	10	5	3
6	(France) Thierry Lincou	12	11	11
11	(Malaysia) Mohd Azlan Iskandar	11	11	11
Q	(Australia) Wade Johnstone	4	5	5
(England) Alister Walker	8	11	10	7
2	(Egypt) Ramy Ashour	11	7	12	11

Second round
1	(Egypt) Shabana	11	7	11	12
13	(Scotland) White	9	11	5	10
5	(Australia) Palmer	11	11	9	11
12	(England) Grant	6	8	11	6
3	(France) Gaultier	11	11	11
14	(Finland) Tuominen	4	4	5
7	(Egypt) Darwish	11	11	12
15	(Netherlands) Anjema	7	5	10
9	(England) Beachill	9	11	10	11	8
8	(England) Barker	11	4	12	9	11
10	(Malaysia) Beng Hee	9	9	7
4	(England) Willstrop	11	11	11
16	(Wales) Gough	6	3	5
6	(France) Lincou	11	11	11
11	(Malaysia) Iskandar	11	5	11	11
2	(Egypt) Ashour	1	11	8	8

Quarter-finals
1	(Egypt) Shabana	6	11	5	8
5	(Australia) Palmer	11	3	11	11
3	(France) Gaultier	9	7	3
7	(Egypt) Darwish	11	11	11
8	(England) Barker	9	11	9	8
4	(England) Willstrop	11	4	11	11
6	(France) Lincou	11	11	11
11	(Malaysia) Iskandar	8	7	8

Semi-finals
5	(Australia) Palmer	11	3	4
7	(Egypt) Darwish	7	11	8	r
Final
5	(Australia) Palmer	11	11	8	6	13
4	(England) Willstrop	9	9	11	11	11
4	(England) Willstrop	11	11	11
6	(France) Lincou	7	3	7

Preceded by 2007	British Open Squash Championships; England (Liverpool); 2008	Succeeded by 2009
