= 2007 Men's British Open Squash Championship =

British Open Squash Championships
- 69th British Open Championships

Details
- Location: Manchester, England
- Venue: National Squash Centre
- Dates: 18–24 September 2007

The 2007 Dunlop British Open Championships was held at the National Squash Centre from 18 to 24 September 2007.
Grégory Gaultier won the title defeating Thierry Lincou in the final.

== Seeds ==
1. (Egypt) Amr Shabana
2. (Australia) David Palmer
3. (France) Grégory Gaultier
4. (France) Thierry Lincou
5. (England) James Willstrop
6. (England) Nick Matthew
7. (Egypt) Wael El Hindi
8. (Australia) Stewart Boswell
9. (Egypt) Karim Darwish
10. (England) Lee Beachill
11. (Egypt) Mohammed Abbas
12. (England) Peter Barker
13. (England) Adrian Grant
14. (Malaysia) Mohd Azlan Iskandar
15. (Finland) Olli Tuominen
16. (Malaysia) Ong Beng Hee

== Draw and results ==
=== Main draw ===
First round
1	(Egypt) Amr Shabana	11	11	11
Q	(Italy) Davide Bianchetti	7	7	8
Q	(England) Stacey Ross	6	4	4
10	(England) Lee Beachill	11	11	11
6	(England) Nick Matthew	11	11	11
Q	(England) Daryl Selby	5	7	8
(Spain) Borja Golán	10	4	11	7
14	(Malaysia) Mohd Azlan Iskandar	12	11	3	11
3	(France) Grégory Gaultier	11	11	11
Q	(England) Jonathan Kemp	7	4	8
(England) Alister Walker	13	7	1	8
13	(England) Adrian Grant	11	11	11	11
12	(England) Peter Barker	11	11	11
Q	(Pakistan) Farhan Mehboob	5	5	6
(Australia) Cameron Pilley	6	12	11	7	7
7	(Egypt) Wael El Hindi	11	10	5	11	11
8	(Australia) Stewart Boswell	11	11	11
Q	(India) Saurav Ghosal	8	3	9
(Wales) Alex Gough	11	5	9	12	9
16	(Malaysia) Ong Beng Hee	8	11	11	10	11
11	(Egypt) Mohammed Abbas	11	6	7	11	11
(England) Joey Barrington	4	11	11	4	8
(Pakistan) Mansoor Zaman	7	4	6
4	(France) Thierry Lincou	11	11	11
9	(Egypt) Karim Darwish	11	11	11	11
(Pakistan) Aamir Atlas Khan	13	5	9	8
Q	(Republic of Ireland) John Rooney	7	5	4
5	(England) James Willstrop	11	11	11
15	(Finland) Olli Tuominen	11	12	11
WC	(England) Andrew Whipp	8	10	5
Q	(France) Julien Balbo	2	8	4
2	(Australia) David Palmer	11	11	11

Second round
1	(Egypt) Shabana	11	2	14	11
10	(England) Beachill	5	11	12	3
6	(England) Matthew	11	11	11
14	(Malaysia) Iskandar	9	5	4
3	(France) Gaultier	11	11	4	11
13	(England) Grant	5	9	11	8
12	(England) Barker	9	3	11	11	11
7	(Egypt) El Hindi	11	11	9	8	4
8	(Australia) Boswell	6	7	11	8
16	(Malaysia) Beng Hee	11	11	9	11
11	(Egypt) Abbas	11	3	9	11	9
4	(France) Lincou	3	11	11	8	11
9	(Egypt) Darwish	5	7	11	9
5	(England) Willstrop	11	11	9	11
15	(Finland) Tuominen	10	5	9
2	(Australia) Palmer	12	11	11

Quarter-finals
1	(Egypt) Shabana	6	11	11	11
6	(England) Matthew	11	8	9	7
3	(France) Gaultier	11	11	11
12	(England) Barker	7	8	3
16	(Malaysia) Beng Hee	8	2	10
4	(France) Lincou	11	11	12
5	(England) Willstrop	10	11	10	11	5
2	(Australia) Palmer	12	6	12	6	11

Semi-finals
1	(Egypt) Shabana	9	11	5	9
3	(France) Gaultier	11	5	11	11
Final
3	(France) Gaultier	11	10	11	11
4	(France) Lincou	4	12	6	3
4	(France) Lincou	5	11	11	11
2	(Australia) Palmer	11	8	4	7

Preceded by 2006	British Open Squash Championships; England (Manchester); 2007	Succeeded by 2008
