= 2004 Men's British Open Squash Championship =

Squash tournament in Nottingham

British Open Squash Championships
- 66th British Open Championships

Details
- Location: Nottingham, England
- Venue: Albert Hall, Nottingham
- Dates: 31 October – 6 November 2004

The 2004 Harris British Open Championships was held at the Albert Hall, Nottingham from 31 October – 6 November 2004.
David Palmer retained his title defeating Amr Shabana in the final.

== Seeds ==
1. (England) Lee Beachill
2. (France) Thierry Lincou
3. (Australia) David Palmer
4. (England) Nick Matthew
5. (Egypt) Amr Shabana
6. (Scotland) John White
7. (Australia) Joseph Kneipp
8. (France) Grégory Gaultier
9. (England) James Willstrop
10. (England) Adrian Grant
11. (Australia) Anthony Ricketts
12. (Egypt) Mohammed Abbas
13. (France) Renan Lavigne
14. (Canada) Graham Ryding
15. (England) Mark Chaloner
16. (Malaysia) Ong Beng Hee

== Draw and results ==
=== Main draw ===
First round
1	(England) Lee Beachill	11	11	11
(South Africa) Rodney Durbach	2	3	9
Q	(Spain) Borja Golán	4	9	5
9	(England) James Willstrop	11	11	11
7	(Australia) Joseph Kneipp	4	11	12	5	11
(Egypt) Wael El Hindi	11	6	10	11	3
Q	(England) Alex Stait	5	8	11	7
16	(Malaysia) Ong Beng Hee	11	11	9	11
8	(France) Grégory Gaultier	12	3	11	11
(Wales) Alex Gough	10	11	9	6
Q	(England) Joey Barrington	8	11	13	2	3
13	(France) Renan Lavigne	11	4	11	11	11
12	(Egypt) Mohammed Abbas	9	5	10
(Finland) Olli Tuominen	11	11	12
Q	(Australia) Raj Nanda	6	9	4
3	(Australia) David Palmer	11	11	11
4	(England) Nick Matthew	11	15	11
(Italy) Davide Bianchetti	9	13	4
(Malaysia) Mohd Azlan Iskandar	11	11	6	11
15	(England) Mark Chaloner	7	4	11	8
14	(Canada) Graham Ryding	11	11	11
Q	(England) Jonathan Kemp	9	4	7
Q	(England) Alister Walker	7	11	11	4
5	(Egypt) Amr Shabana	11	13	6	11
6	(Scotland) John White	11	11	2
(Pakistan) Mansoor Zaman	7	3	0	r
Q	(England) Stacey Ross	9	3	9
11	(Australia) Anthony Ricketts	11	11	11
10	(England) Adrian Grant	7	11	12	4	11
(England) Simon Parke	11	9	10	11	9
Q	(Pakistan) Shahid Zaman	7	10	9
2	(France) Thierry Lincou	11	12	11

Second round
1	(England) Beachill	8	11	11	11
9	(England) Willstrop	11	8	9	9
7	(Australia) Kneipp	11	11	11
16	(Malaysia) Beng Hee	3	6	8
8	(France) Gaultier	11	11	11
13	(France) Lavigne	4	6	8
(Finland) Tuominen	8	8	6
3	(Australia) Palmer	11	11	11
4	(England) Matthew	11	11	12
(Malaysia) Iskandar	2	9	10
14	(Canada) Ryding	11	6	9	5
5	(Egypt) Shabana	9	11	11	11
6	(Scotland) White	7	11	7	11	9
11	(Australia) Ricketts	11	6	11	6	11
10	(England) Grant	6	6	9
2	(France) Lincou	11	11	11

Quarter-finals
1	(England) Beachill	11	11	9	11
7	(Australia) Kneipp	8	7	11	7
8	(France) Gaultier	6	11	2	2
3	(Australia) Palmer	11	4	11	11
4	(England) Matthew	3	8	8
5	(Egypt) Shabana	11	11	11
11	(Australia) Ricketts	11	9	4	6
2	(France) Lincou	7	11	11	11

Semi-finals
1	(England) Beachill	8	11	12	4	9
3	(Australia) Palmer	11	6	10	11	11
Final
3	(Australia) Palmer	14	11	13	11
5	(Egypt) Shabana	16	7	11	7
5	(Egypt) Shabana	12	12	11
2	(France) Lincou	10	10	7

Preceded by 2003	British Open Squash Championships; England (Nottingham); 2004	Succeeded by 2005
