= 1998 Men's World Open Squash Championship =

Men's World Open 1998
- 22nd PSA World Squash Championship
- Location: Doha, Qatar
- Date: November 27 – December 5, 1998

PSA World Tour
- Category: PSA World Open
- Prize money: $ 175,000

Results
- Champion: (Canada) Jonathon Power
- Runner-up: (Scotland) Peter Nicol
- Semi-finalists: (Australia) Anthony Hill (Belgium) Stefan Casteleyn

The 1998 PSA Men's Mahindra World Open Squash Championship is the men's edition of the 1998 World Open, which serves as the individual world championship for squash players. The event took place in Doha in Qatar from 27 November to 5 December 1998. Jonathon Power won his first World Open title, defeating Peter Nicol in the final.

== Seeds ==
1. (Scotland) Peter Nicol (final)
2. (Canada) Jonathon Power (champion)
3. (Australia) Rodney Eyles (second round)
4. (Wales) Alex Gough (quarterfinals)
5. (Egypt) Ahmed Barada (quarterfinals)
6. (England) Paul Johnson (third round)
7. (Australia) Anthony Hill (semifinals)
8. (England) Simon Parke (third round)
9. (England) Mark Chaloner (first round)
10. (England) Chris Walker (third round)
11. (Australia) Dan Jenson (second round)
12. (England) Mark Cairns (second round)
13. (England) Del Harris (third round)
14. (Australia) Byron Davis (second round)
15. (Canada) Graham Ryding (third round)
16. (Republic of Ireland) Derek Ryan (first round)

== Draw and results ==
=== Finals ===
Quarter finals
1	(Scotland) Peter Nicol	13	15	17	15
6	(England) Paul Johnson	15	4	16	9
(Scotland) John White	15	13	9	15
(Belgium) Stefan Casteleyn	10	15	15	17
4	(Wales) Alex Gough	15	11	10	7
7	(Australia) Anthony Hill	13	15	15	15
5	(Egypt) Ahmed Barada	5	2	3
2	(Canada) Jonathon Power	15	15	15

Semi finals
1	(Scotland) Nicol	15	15	15
(Belgium) Casteleyn	8	13	7
7	(Australia) Hill	3	15	10	8
2	(Canada) Power	15	13	15	15

Final
1	(Scotland) Nicol	17	7	9	10
2	(Canada) Power	15	15	15	15

=== Top half ===
==== Section 1 ====
First round
1	(Scotland) Peter Nicol	15	15	15
(Pakistan) Kumail Mahmood	11	6	8
(Pakistan) Shamsul Islam Khan	5	9	7
(Egypt) Amir Wagih	15	15	15
(England) Julian Wellings	17	11	15	15
(Australia) Paul Price	15	15	11	11
(Australia) Billy Haddrell	13	16	15	15	15
9	(England) Mark Chaloner	15	17	11	10	5
13	(England) Del Harris	15	15	15
(Pakistan) Mir Zaman Gul	5	11	7
(England) Chris Tomlinson	17	15	15
(Australia) Stewart Boswell	16	8	13
(Italy) Davide Bianchetti	17	15	6	6	8
(Australia) Craig Rowland	15	8	15	15	15
(England) Adam Toes	12	15	4	11
6	(England) Paul Johnson	15	3	15	15

Second round
1	(Scotland) Nicol	15	15	15
(Egypt) Wagih	6	9	13
(England) Wellings	12	15	15	11	14
(Australia) Haddrell	15	13	9	15	15
13	(England) Harris	15	15	15
(England) Tomlinson	9	5	6
(Australia) Rowland	14	10	12
6	(England) Johnson	17	15	15

Third round
1	(Scotland) Nicol	15	15	12	15
(Australia) Haddrell	13	5	15	12
13	(England) Harris	15	10	10	17	5
6	(England) Johnson	8	15	15	15	15

Quarter finals
1	(Scotland) Nicol	13	15	17	15
6	(England) Johnson	15	4	16	9

==== Section 2 ====
First round
11	(Australia) Dan Jenson	15	15	15
(Pakistan) Zubair Jahan Khan	6	6	13
(Scotland) John White	15	15	15
(Pakistan) Humayum Khan	11	6	11
(Egypt) Omar El Borolossy	15	15	15
(Finland) Mika Monto	13	7	12
(Australia) John Williams	5	15	8	10
8	(England) Simon Parke	15	10	15	15
10	(England) Chris Walker	15	15	15
(Egypt) Karim El Mistikawi	6	13	8
(Finland) Janne Kyttanen	7	8	11
(Wales) David Evans	15	15	15
(Belgium) Stefan Casteleyn	15	15	15
(Pakistan) Kashif Shuja	8	4	12
(England) Paul Hargrave	7	14	17	10
3	(Australia) Rodney Eyles	15	15	14	15

Second round
11	(Australia) Jenson	11	12	15	17	10
(Scotland) White	15	15	12	16	15
(Egypt) El Borolossy	12	10	13
8	(England) Parke	15	15	15
10	(England) Walker	15	13	15	15
(Wales) Evans	11	15	8	9
(Belgium) Casteleyn	12	15	15	17
3	(Australia) Eyles	15	10	13	16

Third round
(Scotland) White	6	15	13	15	15
8	(England) Parke	15	11	15	5	11
10	(England) Walker	17	13	12	8
(Belgium) Casteleyn	15	15	15	15

Quarter finals
(Scotland) White	15	13	9	15
(Belgium) Casteleyn	10	15	15	17

=== Bottom half ===
==== Section 1 ====
First round
4	(Wales) Alex Gough	15	15	15
(Hong Kong) Abdul Faheem Khan	10	10	13
(England) Nick Taylor	15	15
(Egypt) Amr Shabana	7	6	rtd
(England) Lee Beachill	15	6	15	15
(France) Julien Bonetat	11	15	9	8
(South Africa) Glenn Whittaker	13	7	15	12
12	(England) Mark Cairns	15	15	13	15
7	(Australia) Anthony Hill	15	17	12	10	15
(Finland) Juha Raumolin	7	15	15	15	9
(Pakistan) Zarak Jahan Khan	17	5	12	12
(France) Thierry Lincou	14	15	15	15
(England) Marcus Berrett	15	15	13	5	15
(England) Stephen Meads	9	11	15	15	13
(England) Nathan Dugan	15	15	15	7	11
14	(Australia) Byron Davis	9	9	17	15	15

Second round
4	(Wales) Gough	15	15	15
(England) Taylor	6	13	5
(England) Beachill	15	15	15
12	(England) Cairns	13	11	8
7	(Australia) Hill	15	15	13	12	15
(France) Lincou	5	8	15	15	14
(England) Berrett	15	15	15
13	(Australia) Davis	9	12	5

Third round
4	(Wales) Gough	15	15	15
(England) Beachill	12	9	11
7	(Australia) Hill	15	15	15
(England) Berrett	4	8	6

Quarter finals
4	(Wales) Gough	15	11	10	7
7	(Australia) Hill	13	15	15	15

==== Section 2 ====
First round
5	(Egypt) Ahmed Barada	15	12	15	15
(Australia) Joseph Kneipp	13	15	13	11
(Australia) Anthony Ricketts	17	14	15	13	7
(Scotland) Martin Heath	16	15	1	15	15
(England) Tony Hands	15	15	15
(Egypt) Mohd Medhat Morsi	12	8	5
(Australia) David Palmer	13	15	17	15
16	(Republic of Ireland) Derek Ryan	15	8	16	13
15	(Canada) Graham Ryding	15	8	17	15
(Egypt) Ahmed Faizy	11	15	15	11
(Sweden) Daniel Forslund	15	12	12	15	11
(Pakistan) Amjad Khan	11	15	15	5	15
(England) Tim Garner	15	12	15	15
(Pakistan) Mohammed Hussain	11	15	7	6
(Pakistan) Mansoor Zaman	12	8	5
2	(Canada) Jonathon Power	15	15	15

Second round
5	(Egypt) Barada	15	14	15	15
(Scotland) Heath	6	17	11	7
(England) Hands	13	15	15	15
(Australia) Palmer	15	13	7	7
15	(Canada) Ryding	15	15	15
(Pakistan) A Khan	10	13	11
(England) Garner	13	13	8
2	(Canada) Power	15	15	15

Third round
5	(Egypt) Barada	15	15	14	15
(England) Hands	7	8	15	9
15	(Canada) Ryding	4	4	11
2	(Canada) Power	15	15	15

Quarter finals
5	(Egypt) Barada	5	2	3
2	(Canada) Power	15	15	15

== See also ==
- PSA World Open
- 1998 Women's World Open Squash Championship

Preceded by Malaysia (Petaling Jaya); 1997	PSA World Open; Qatar (Doha); 1998	Succeeded by Egypt (Cairo); 1999
