= 2009 Men's British Open Squash Championship =

British Open Squash Championships
- 71st British Open Championships

Details
- Location: Manchester, England
- Venue: National Squash Centre
- Dates: 8–14 September 2009

The 2009 Dunlop British Open Championships was held at the National Squash Centre from 8–14 September 2009.
Nick Matthew won his second British Open title by defeating James Willstrop in the final. This was the first all English final since the pre-war challenge system.

== Seeds ==
1. (Egypt) Karim Darwish
2. (France) Grégory Gaultier
3. (Egypt) Amr Shabana
4. (England) Nick Matthew
5. (Australia) David Palmer
6. (England) Peter Barker
7. (France) Thierry Lincou
8. (England) Adrian Grant
9. (Egypt) Wael El Hindi
10. (England) James Willstrop
11. (England) Alister Walker
12. (Malaysia) Mohd Azlan Iskandar
13. (Egypt) Mohamed El Shorbagy
14. (Pakistan) Aamir Atlas Khan
15. (Australia) Cameron Pilley
16. (Malaysia) Ong Beng Hee

== Draw and results ==
=== Main draw ===
First round
1	(Egypt) Karim Darwish	11	11	11
(England) Jonathan Kemp	7	6	1
Q	(New Zealand) Campbell Grayson	4	5	7
10	(England) James Willstrop	11	11	11
7	(France) Thierry Lincou	11	11	11
Q	(New Zealand) Martin Knight	7	2	7
Q	(Pakistan) Yasir Butt	11	8	11	4
12	(Malaysia) Mohd Azlan Iskandar	13	11	9	11
3	(Egypt) Amr Shabana	11	11	11
WC	(Germany) Jens Schoor	4	4	5
Q	(France) Renan Lavigne	5	11	6	11	10
11	(England) Alister Walker	11	7	11	9	12
5	(Australia) David Palmer	11	11	11
(England) Tom Richards	6	6	5
(England) Joey Barrington	11	10	7	10
9	(Egypt) Wael El Hindi	5	12	11	12
14	(Pakistan) Aamir Atlas Khan	1	4	r
(England) Daryl Selby	11	9
Q	(Germany) Simon Rösner	10	10	5
8	(England) Adrian Grant	12	12	11
15	(Australia) Cameron Pilley	13	11	11
(Pakistan) Farhan Mehboob	11	3	9
Q	(England) Chris Simpson	10	2	5
4	(England) Nick Matthew	12	11	11
16	(Malaysia) Ong Beng Hee	11	11	7	5	11
(Italy) Davide Bianchetti	8	7	11	11	3
Q	(France) Stéphane Galifi	9	11	5	2
6	(England) Peter Barker	11	4	11	11
13	(Egypt) Mohamed El Shorbagy	7	11	11	11	7
Q	(New Zealand) Kashif Shuja	11	13	9	2	11
(India) Saurav Ghosal	7	6	5
2	(France) Grégory Gaultier	11	11	11

Second round
1	(Egypt) Darwish	11	2	r
10	(England) Willstrop	5	4
7	(France) Lincou	13	4	11	12	5
12	(Malaysia) Iskandar	11	11	5	14	11
3	(Egypt) Shabana	7	11	11	11
11	(England) Walker	11	4	5	7
5	(Australia) Palmer	11	1	8	11	11
9	(Egypt) Hindi	6	11	11	7	5
(England) Selby	11	11	9	11
8	(England) Grant	8	8	11	8
15	(Australia) Pilley	3	3	6
4	(England) Matthew	11	11	11
16	(Malaysia) Beng Hee	7	7	8
6	(England) Barker	11	11	11
Q	(New Zealand) Shuja	5	7	1
2	(France) Gaultier	11	11	11

Quarter-finals
10	(England) Willstrop	11	11	12
12	(Malaysia) Iskandar	5	6	10
3	(Egypt) Shabana	11	14	4	19
5	(Australia) Palmer	8	12	11	17
(England) Selby	7	5	8
4	(England) Matthew	11	11	11
6	(England) Barker	11	7	11	7	11
2	(France) Gaultier	7	11	3	11	8

Semi-finals
10	(England) Willstrop	11	11	11
3	(Egypt) Shabana	5	6	1
Final
10	(England) Willstrop	11	8	11	3	10
4	(England) Matthew	8	11	7	11	12
4	(England) Matthew	11	11	11
6	(England) Barker	6	5	6

Preceded by 2008	British Open Squash Championships; England (Manchester); 2009	Succeeded by 2012
