= Alexandria International 2015 =

- 2nd Alexandria International

Details
- Event name: Alexandria International Squash Open 2015
- Location: Alexandria, Egypt
- Website www.squashsite.co.uk/2009/alexandria20151.htm

Men's Winner
- Category: International 100
- Prize money: $100,000
- Year: World Tour 2015

The Alexandria International 2015 is the women's edition of the 2015 Alexandria International, which is a tournament of the PSA World Tour event International (Prize money : 100 000 $). The event took place at the Library of Alexandria in Alexandria in Egypt from 4 June to 10 June. Raneem El Weleily won her first Alexandria International trophy, beating Omneya Abdel Kawy in the final.

== Prize money and ranking points ==
For 2015, the prize purse was $100,000. The prize money and points breakdown is as follows:

Prize Money Alexandria International (2015)
Event	W	F	SF	QF	2R	1R
Points (PSA)	4100	2800	1675	900	450	255
Prize money	$14,450	$9,775	$5,740	$3,400	$1,910	$1,060

== Seeds ==
1. (Malaysia) Nicol David (semifinals)
2. (Egypt) Raneem El Weleily (champion)
3. (England) Alison Waters (quarterfinals)
4. (England) Laura Massaro (semifinals)
5. (Egypt) Nour El Tayeb (quarterfinals)
6. (France) Camille Serme (quarterfinals)
7. (Egypt) Omneya Abdel Kawy (final)
8. (Egypt) Nour El Sherbini (quarterfinals)
9. (United States) Amanda Sobhy (second round)
10. (England) Sarah-Jane Perry (first round)
11. (Egypt) Nouran Ahmed Gohar (second round)
12. (England) Jenny Duncalf (second round)
13. (India) Dipika Pallikal (second round)
14. (Egypt) Salma Hany Ibrahim (first round)
15. (Guyana) Nicolette Fernandes (second round)
16. (Egypt) Habiba Mohamed (second round)

== Draw and results ==
First round
1	(Malaysia) Nicol David	11	11	11
(England) Victoria Lust	6	4	4
Q	(Egypt) Zeina Farid Mickawy	3	9	2
11	(Egypt) Nouran Ahmed Gohar	11	11	11
10	(England) Sarah-Jane Perry	9	5	6
Q	(Egypt) Kanzy El Dafrawy	11	11	11
(Egypt) Heba El Torky	6	6	9
5	(Egypt) Nour El Tayeb	11	11	11
7	(Egypt) Omneya Abdel Kawy	11	7	11	11	16
(Australia) Donna Urquhart	6	11	13	3	14
Q	(Egypt) Mariam Metwally	12	11	11
14	(Egypt) Salma Hany Ibrahim	10	3	4
16	(Egypt) Habiba Mohamed	12	11	11
Q	(France) Cyrielle Peltier	10	9	4
(Mexico) Samantha Terán	9	6	5
3	(England) Alison Waters	11	11	11
4	(England) Laura Massaro	11	10	11	12
Q	(Egypt) Yathreb Adel	9	12	3	10
Q	(Egypt) Nadin Shahin	2	5	13	5
9	(United States) Amanda Sobhy	11	11	11	11
12	(England) Jenny Duncalf	11	11	11
Q	(France) Coline Aumard	4	9	9
Q	(France) Laura Pomportes	4	5	7
8	(Egypt) Nour El Sherbini	11	11	11
6	(France) Camille Serme	11	14	11
(Wales) Tesni Evans	9	12	5
(India) Joshna Chinappa	8	7	9
15	(Guyana) Nicolette Fernandes	11	11	11
13	(India) Dipika Pallikal	11	11	11
WC	(Egypt) Hana Ramadan	9	8	8
(England) Emily Whitlock	6	13	7	4
2	(Egypt) Raneem El Weleily	11	11	11	11

Second round
1	(Malaysia) Nicol David	13	11	12
11	(Egypt) Nouran Ahmed Gohar	11	3	10
Q	(Egypt) Kanzy El Dafrawy	6	12	7	7
5	(Egypt) Nour El Tayeb	11	10	11	11
7	(Egypt) Omneya Abdel Kawy	11	13	11	11
Q	(Egypt) Mariam Metwally	13	11	7	9
16	(Egypt) Habiba Mohamed	8	7	13	8
3	(England) Alison Waters	11	11	11	11
4	(England) Laura Massaro	11	11	9	11
9	(United States) Amanda Sobhy	7	8	11	7
12	(England) Jenny Duncalf	3	6	5
8	(Egypt) Nour El Sherbini	11	11	11
6	(France) Camille Serme	11	11	11
15	(Guyana) Nicolette Fernandes	7	6	3
13	(India) Dipika Pallikal	9	12	10	3
2	(Egypt) Raneem El Weleily	11	9	12	11

Quarter finals
1	(Malaysia) Nicol David	11	11	11
5	(Egypt) Nour El Tayeb	5	8	9
7	(Egypt) Omneya Abdel Kawy	8	11	2	11	11
3	(England) Alison Waters	11	9	11	3	3
4	(England) Laura Massaro	5	11	7	11	11
8	(Egypt) Nour El Sherbini	11	8	11	7	8
6	(France) Camille Serme	11	4	13	5	1
2	(Egypt) Raneem El Weleily	8	11	11	11	11

Semi finals
1	(Malaysia) Nicol David	7	7	11	11	10
7	(Egypt) Omneya Abdel Kawy	11	11	8	1	12
Final
7	(Egypt) Omneya Abdel Kawy	6	5	9
2	(Egypt) Raneem El Weleily	11	11	11
4	(England) Laura Massaro	8	11	5	11	5
2	(Egypt) Raneem El Weleily	11	8	11	8	11

== See also ==
- 2015 PSA World Series
- El Gouna International 2015
