= Women's Windy City Open 2015 =

Windy City Open 2015
- 4th Women's Windy City Open

Details
- Event name: Guggenheim Partners MetroSquash Windy City Open
- Location: Chicago United States
- Venue: University Club of Chicago
- Website www.windycityopen.com

Men's Winner
- Category: World Series
- Prize money: $150,000
- Year: World Tour 2015

The Women's Windy City Open 2015 is the women's edition of the 2015 Windy City Open, which is a PSA World Series event (prize money: 150 000 $). The event took place at the University Club of Chicago in Chicago in the United States from the 26 February to 4 March 2015. Raneem El Weleily won her first Windy City Open trophy, beating Nicol David in the final.

== Prize money and ranking points ==
For 2015, the prize purse was $150,000. The prize money and points breakdown is as follows:

Prize money Windy City Open (2015)
| Event | W | F | SF | QF | 2R | 1R |
| Points (PSA) | 4800 | 3300 | 1950 | 1050 | 525 | 300 |
| Prize money | $22,950 | $15,525 | $9,115 | $5,400 | $3,040 | $1,685 |

== Seeds ==
1. (Malaysia) Nicol David (final)
2. (Egypt) Raneem El Weleily (champion)
3. (England) Laura Massaro (second round)
4. (Egypt) Nour El Sherbini (quarterfinals)
5. (England) Alison Waters (quarterfinals)
6. (France) Camille Serme (semifinals)
7. (Malaysia) Low Wee Wern (quarterfinals)
8. (Egypt) Nour El Tayeb (semifinals)
9. (Egypt) Omneya Abdel Kawy (second round)
10. (Hong Kong) Annie Au (second round)
11. (Australia) Rachael Grinham (second round)
12. (India) Dipika Pallikal (first round)
13. (Republic of Ireland) Madeline Perry (second round)
14. (England) Sarah-Jane Perry (second round)
15. (Egypt) Nouran Ahmed Gohar (first round)
16. (England) Emma Beddoes (quarterfinals)

== Draw and results ==
1* First round 2* 3*
1 | (Malaysia) Nicol David | 11 | 11 | 12
WC | (United States) Olivia Blatchford | 3 | 6 | 10
Q | (Egypt) Heba El Torky | 11 | 11 | 5 | 11
12 | (India) Dipika Pallikal | 9 | 9 | 11 | 6
15 | (Egypt) Nouran Ahmed Gohar | 11 | 9 | 9 | 6
Q | (England) Victoria Lust | 7 | 11 | 11 | 11
(Netherlands) Natalie Grinham | 10 | 3 | 10
5 | (England) Alison Waters | 12 | 11 | 12
8 | (Egypt) Nour El Tayeb | 11 | 11 | 12
(India) Joshna Chinappa | 8 | 3 | 10
Q | (Mexico) Samantha Terán | wo
13 | (Republic of Ireland) Madeline Perry
10 | (Hong Kong) Annie Au | 12 | 11 | 8 | 11
(England) Jenny Duncalf | 10 | 4 | 11 | 8
Q | (New Zealand) Amanda Land.-Murphy | 1 | 4 | 7
4 | (Egypt) Nour El Sherbini | 11 | 11 | 11
3 | (England) Laura Massaro | 7 | 11 | 11 | 13
Q | (Malaysia) Delia Arnold | 11 | 5 | 6 | 11
(Egypt) Salma Hany Ibrahim | 0 | rtd
16 | (England) Emma Beddoes | 4
14 | (England) Sarah-Jane Perry | 11 | 11 | 11
(Guyana) Nicolette Fernandes | 6 | 6 | 7
Q | (Canada) Samantha Cornett | 6 | 5 | 3
6 | (France) Camille Serme | 11 | 11 | 11
7 | (Malaysia) Low Wee Wern | 11 | 9 | 12 | 11
(Egypt) Habiba Mohamed | 8 | 11 | 10 | 6
(Hong Kong) Joey Chan | 6 | 11 | 13 | 6
11 | (Australia) Rachael Grinham | 11 | 2 | 15 | 11
9 | (Egypt) Omneya Abdel Kawy | 11 | 11 | 10 | 11
Q | (Wales) Tesni Evans | 5 | 7 | 12 | 8
Q | (Denmark) Line Hansen | 3 | 5 | 3
2 | (Egypt) Raneem El Weleily | 11 | 11 | 11

1* Second round 2*
1 | (Malaysia) Nicol David | 11 | 11 | 11
Q | (Egypt) Heba El Torky | 5 | 4 | 7
Q | (England) Victoria Lust | 11 | 5 | 4
5 | (England) Alison Waters | 13 | 11 | 11
8 | (Egypt) Nour El Tayeb | 11 | 11 | 11
13 | (Republic of Ireland) Madeline Perry | 6 | 7 | 9
10 | (Hong Kong) Annie Au | 6 | 4 | 11 | 8
4 | (Egypt) Nour El Sherbini | 11 | 11 | 8 | 11
3 | (England) Laura Massaro | 11 | 7 | 11 | 10 | 7
16 | (England) Emma Beddoes | 6 | 11 | 7 | 12 | 11
14 | (England) Sarah-Jane Perry | 9 | 13 | 6 | 5
6 | (France) Camille Serme | 11 | 11 | 11 | 11
7 | (Malaysia) Low Wee Wern | 7 | 11 | 3 | 11 | 11
11 | (Australia) Rachael Grinham | 11 | 2 | 11 | 9 | 6
9 | (Egypt) Omneya Abdel Kawy | 7 | 11 | 9 | 8
2 | (Egypt) Raneem El Weleily | 11 | 7 | 11 | 11

Quarter finals *
1 | (Malaysia) Nicol David | 12 | 12 | 11
5 | (England) Alison Waters | 10 | 10 | 7
8 | (Egypt) Nour El Tayeb | 11 | 11 | 11
4 | (Egypt) Nour El Sherbini | 7 | 9 | 5
16 | (England) Emma Beddoes | 4 | 2 | 5
6 | (France) Camille Serme | 11 | 11 | 11
7 | (Malaysia) Low Wee Wern | 11 | 6 | 3 | 9
2 | (Egypt) Raneem El Weleily | 9 | 11 | 11 | 11

Semi finals *
1 | (Malaysia) Nicol David | 11 | 13 | 12
8 | (Egypt) Nour El Tayeb | 9 | 11 | 10
Final
1 | (Malaysia) Nicol David | 16 | 10 | 7 | 7
2 | (Egypt) Raneem El Weleily * | 14 | 12 | 11 | 11
6 | (France) Camille Serme | 8 | 11 | 11 | 9 | 4
2 | (Egypt) Raneem El Weleily | 11 | 8 | 8 | 11 | 11

Based on Squashsite and WSA sources.

== See also ==
- 2015 PSA World Tour
- Men's Windy City Open 2015
- Metro Squash Windy City Open

| Preceded by Tournament of Champions; United States (New York); 2015 | PSA World Series 2015; Windy City Open; United States (Chicago); 2015 | Succeeded by British Open; England (Hull); 2015 |
