= Windy City Open =

Squash Tournament in Chicago

Details
- Event name: Metro Squash Windy City Open
- Location: Chicago, United States
- Venue: University Club of Chicago
- Website www.windycityopen.com

Men's Winner
- Category: World Series
- Prize money: $250,000
- Most recent champion(s): (Egypt) Mostafa Asal

Women's Winner
- Category: World Series
- Prize money: $250,000
- Most recent champion(s): (Egypt) Nour El Sherbini

The Windy City Open is an annual men's and women's squash tournament held each February in Chicago, United States. It is part of the PSA World Series, the highest level of professional squash competition. The event was first held in 1981.

== Results ==
=== Men's ===
| Year | Champion | Runner-up | Score in final |
|---|---|---|---|
| 1982 | (United States) Mark Talbott | | |
| 1983 | (United States) Mark Talbott | | |
| 1984 | (United States) Mark Talbott | | |
| 1985 | (United States) Mark Talbott | | |
| 1986 | (United States) Mark Talbott | | |
| 1987 | (United States) Mark Talbott | | |
| 1988 | (United States) Mark Talbott | | |
| 1989 | (United States) Mark Talbott | | |
| 1990 | (United States) Mark Talbott | | |
| 1991 | (United States) Mark Talbott | | |
| 1992 | (United States) Mark Talbott | | |
| 1993 | (United States) Mark Talbott | | |
| 1994 | (Canada) Gary Waite | (Australia) Byron Davis | 15–9, 15–13, 15–8 |
| 1995 | (England) Mark Chaloner | (South Africa) Rodney Durbach | |
| 1996 | No competition | | |
| 1997 | No competition | | |
| 1998 | (England) Marcus Berrett | (England) Lee Beachill | |
| 1999 | (England) Stephen Meads | (Canada) Kelly Patrick | 15–11, 15–7, 15–8 |
| 2000 | No competition | | |
| 2001 | (France) Thierry Lincou | (Australia) John Williams | 17–16, 15–12, 13–15, 15–13 |
| 2002 | (England) Nick Taylor | (France) Grégory Gaultier | 15–10, 15–7, 15–4 |
| 2003 | (Australia) Paul Price | (France) Grégory Gaultier | 15–11, 15–14, 15–17, 15–11 |
| 2004 | (England) Nick Matthew | (France) Grégory Gaultier | 12–15, 15–9, 15–12, 15–4 |
| 2005 | (Scotland) John White | (Egypt) Amr Shabana | 11–7, 11–8, 11–4 |
| 2006 | (Australia) David Palmer | (Canada) Jonathon Power | 11–5, 5–11, 11–8, 9–11, 12–10 |
| 2007 | (Egypt) Amr Shabana | (Australia) Anthony Ricketts | 11–8, 11–8, 15–13 |
| 2008 | No competition | | |
| 2009 | No competition | | |
| 2010 | No competition | | |
| 2011 | (England) Oliver Pett | (Czech Republic) Jan Koukal | 13–11, 11–6, 11–4 |
| 2012 | (India) Saurav Ghosal | (Pakistan) Yasir Butt | 11–8, 15–13, 10–12, 11–5 |
| 2013 | (Spain) Borja Golán | (South Africa) Stephen Coppinger | 5–11, 11–8, 11–6, 11–6 |
| 2014 | (France) Grégory Gaultier | (Egypt) Ramy Ashour | 11–7, 11–3, 11–4 |
| 2015 | (England) Nick Matthew | (Egypt) Mohamed El Shorbagy | 11–7, 11–2, 11–7 |
| 2016 | (Egypt) Mohamed El Shorbagy | (England) Nick Matthew | 11–6, 11–3, 2–0 ret. |
| 2017 | (France) Grégory Gaultier | (Egypt) Marwan El Shorbagy | 5–11, 11–8, 11–2, 11–4 |
| 2018 | (Egypt) Mohamed El Shorbagy | (Egypt) Marwan El Shorbagy | 11–8, 11–8, 11–6 |
| 2019 | No competition | | |
| 2020 | (Egypt) Ali Farag | (New Zealand) Paul Coll | 12–14, 9–11, 11–7, 11–6, 11–1 |
| 2021 | No competition | | |
| 2022 | (New Zealand) Paul Coll | (Egypt) Youssef Ibrahim | 7–11, 10–12, 11–4, 11–7, 11–9 |
| 2023 | No competition due to the realization of 2022-2023 PSA World Championships (May 3rd - 11th) | | |
| 2024 | (Egypt) Ali Farag | (New Zealand) Paul Coll | 11–8, 5–11, 11–7, 15–13 |
| 2025 | No competition | | |
| 2026 | (Egypt) Mostafa Asal | (New Zealand) Paul Coll | 11–5, 12–10, 11–7 |

=== Men's champions by country ===
| Champions | | Runner-up | |
|---|---|---|---|
| United States | 12 | Egypt | 6 |
| England | 7 | New Zealand | 3 |
| Egypt | 6 | Australia | 3 |
| France | 3 | France | 3 |
| Australia | 2 | England | 2 |
| Canada | 1 | South Africa | 2 |
| New Zealand | 1 | Canada | 2 |
| India | 1 | Czech Republic | 1 |
| Spain | 1 | Pakistan | 1 |
| Scotland | 1 | United States | 0 |

=== Women's ===
| Year | Champion | Runner-up | Score in final |
|---|---|---|---|
| 2008 | (Mexico) Samantha Terán | (United States) Latasha Khan | 9–2, 9–7, 9–2 |
| 2009 | No competition | | |
| 2010 | No competition | | |
| 2011 | (India) Joshna Chinappa | (India) Dipika Pallikal | 11–4, 6–11, 12–10, 2–11, 11–6 |
| 2012 | No competition | | |
| 2013 | No competition | | |
| 2014 | (England) Laura Massaro | (Egypt) Raneem El Weleily | 9–11, 11–8, 11–9, 3–11, 11–6 |
| 2015 | (Egypt) Raneem El Weleily | (Malaysia) Nicol David | 12–14, 12–10, 11–7, 11–7 |
| 2016 | (Egypt) Raneem El Weleily | (Egypt) Nour El Sherbini | 9–11, 11–6, 11–3, 11–6 |
| 2017 | (Egypt) Raneem El Weleily | (Egypt) Nour El Sherbini | 10–12, 11–7, 11–7, 11–7 |
| 2018 | (Egypt) Nour El Tayeb | (New Zealand) Joelle King | 11–8, 10–12, 11–13, 11–9, 12–10 |
| 2019 | No competition | | |
| 2020 | (Egypt) Nour El Sherbini | (Egypt) Raneem El Welily | 11–8, 8–11, 11–8, 6–11, 11–9 |
| 2021 | No competition | | |
| 2022 | (Egypt) Hania El Hammamy | (Egypt) Nour El Sherbini | 5–11, 15–17, 11–5, 11–6, 11–5 |
| 2023 | No competition due the realization of 2022-2023 PSA World Championships (May 3rd - 11th) | | |
| 2024 | (Egypt) Nour El Sherbini | (Egypt) Nouran Gohar | 11–7, 6–11, 11–4, 11–4 |
| 2025 | No competition | | |
| 2026 | (Egypt) Nour El Sherbini | (Egypt) Amina Orfi | 9–11, 10–12, 13–11, 11–5, 11-8 |

=== Women's champions by country ===
| Champions | | Runner-up | |
|---|---|---|---|
| Egypt | 8 | Egypt | 7 |
| England | 1 | New Zealand | 1 |
| India | 1 | India | 1 |
| Mexico | 1 | Malaysia | 1 |
| United States | 0 | United States | 1 |

== See also ==
- PSA World Tour
- PSA World Series
