= Alexandria International =

Details
- Event name: Alexandria International Squash Open
- Location: Alexandria Egypt
- Website www.squashsite.co.uk/2009/alexandria20151.htm

Women's PSA World Tour
- Category: International 100
- Prize money: $100,000
- Most recent champion(s): (Egypt) Raneem El Weleily
- Current: Alexandria International 2015

The Alexandria International is a women's squash tournament held in Alexandria, Egypt in June. It is part of the Women's PSA World Series, the highest level of women's professional squash competition.

== Past results ==
Year	Champion	Runner-up	Score in final
2015	(Egypt) Raneem El Weleily	(Egypt) Omneya Abdel Kawy	11–6, 11–5, 11-9
2014	No competition		
2013	No competition		
2012	No competition		
2011	(Egypt) Nour El Sherbini	(Egypt) Nour El Tayeb	11–5, 11–8, 7–11, 11-8

== See also ==
- Squash in Egypt
- El Gouna International
