= Men's Windy City Open 2015 =

Windy City Open 2015
- 16th Men's Windy City Open

Details
- Event name: Guggenheim Partners MetroSquash Windy City Open
- Location: Chicago United States
- Venue: University Club of Chicago
- Website www.windycityopen.com

Men's Winner
- Category: World Series
- Prize money: $150,000
- Year: World Tour 2015

The Men's Windy City Open 2015 was the men's edition of the 2015 Windy City Open, which was a PSA World Series event (prize money: 150 000 $). The event took place at the University Club of Chicago in the United States from 26 February to 4 March. Nick Matthew won his second Windy City Open trophy, beating Mohamed El Shorbagy in the final.

== Prize money and ranking points ==
For 2015, the prize purse was $150,000. The prize money and points breakdown is as follows:

Prize money Windy City Open (2015)
Event	W	F	SF	QF	2R	1R
Points (PSA)	2625	1725	1050	640	375	190
Prize money	$23,625	$15,525	$9,450	$5,740	$3,375	$1,690

== Seeds ==
1. (Egypt) Mohamed El Shorbagy (final)
2. (France) Grégory Gaultier (semifinals)
3. (Egypt) Amr Shabana (second round)
4. (England) Nick Matthew (champion)
5. (England) Peter Barker (quarterfinals)
6. (Egypt) Tarek Momen (quarterfinals)
7. (Colombia) Miguel Ángel Rodríguez (second round)
8. (Egypt) Omar Mosaad (quarterfinals)

== Draw and results ==
1* 2* First round 3* 4*
1	(Egypt) Mohd El Shorbagy	11	3	10	11	13
(Egypt) Fares Dessouky	9	11	12	7	11
(India) Saurav Ghosal	11	4	11	11	13
(Hong Kong) Max Lee	5	11	8	13	11
(Switzerland) Nicolas Müller	9	11	11	11
Q	(Egypt) Omar Abdel Meguid	11	3	5	9
Q	(Scotland) Alan Clyne	5	6	11	9
6	(Egypt) Tarek Momen	11	11	7	11
7	(Colombia) Miguel Á. Rodríguez	11	11	9	11
Q	(Egypt) Zahed Mohamed	7	8	11	4
Q	(France) Grégoire Marche	5	1	11	5
(Egypt) Karim Abdel Gawad	11	11	8	11
(Egypt) Marwan El Shorbagy	6	12	11	11
(France) Mathieu Castagnet	11	10	7	5
(England) Chris Simpson	6	6	8
3	(Egypt) Amr Shabana	11	11	11
4	(England) Nick Matthew	11	11	13
(Spain) Borja Golán	9	6	11
WC	(United States) Chris Hanson	6	4	2
(England) Daryl Selby	11	11	11
(England) James Willstrop	11	8	11	11
Q	(Mexico) César Salazar	9	11	8	5
(South Africa) Stephen Coppinger	11	12	6	3
5	(England) Peter Barker	6	14	11	11
8	(Egypt) Omar Mosaad	7	11	12	13
(Germany) Simon Rösner	11	8	10	11
Q	(Egypt) Mohamed Abouelghar	11	3	5
(Botswana) Alister Walker	13	11	11
(Australia) Cameron Pilley	11	11	11
Q	(Scotland) Greg Lobban	4	3	9
Q	(Finland) Henrik Mustonen	1	1	4
2	(France) Grégory Gaultier	11	11	11

1* 2* Second round 3* 4*
1	(Egypt) Mohd El Shorbagy	11	4	1	11	11
(India) Saurav Ghosal	5	11	11	5	7
(Switzerland) Nicolas Müller	6	12	7	8
6	(Egypt) Tarek Momen	11	10	11	11
7	(Colombia) Miguel Ángel Rodríguez	7	11	11	9	4
(Egypt) Karim Abdel Gawad	11	5	9	11	11
(Egypt) Marwan El Shorbagy	11	7
3	(Egypt) Amr Shabana	7	2	rtd
4	(England) Nick Matthew	11	11	11
(England) Daryl Selby	8	9	9
(England) James Willstrop	6	11	4	11	6
5	(England) Peter Barker	11	9	11	8	11
8	(Egypt) Omar Mosaad	11	11	11
(Botswana) Alister Walker	5	6	7
(Australia) Cameron Pilley	6	6	6
2	(France) Grégory Gaultier	11	11	11

1* Quarter finals 2*
1	(Egypt) Mohd El Shorbagy	11	11	14
6	(Egypt) Tarek Momen	7	9	12
(Egypt) Karim Abdel Gawad	10	11	11	7	9
(Egypt) Marwan El Shorbagy	12	7	5	11	11
4	(England) Nick Matthew	11	11	11
5	(England) Peter Barker	6	8	5
8	(Egypt) Omar Mosaad	5	6	12
2	(France) Grégory Gaultier	11	11	14

Semi finals *
1	(Egypt) Mohd El Shorbagy	12	11	11
(Egypt) Marwan El Shorbagy	10	8	4
Final
1	(Egypt) Mohamed El Shorbagy	7	2	7
4	(England) Nick Matthew*	11	11	11
4	(England) Nick Matthew	11	9	11	11
2	(France) Grégory Gaultier	7	11	6	5

== See also ==
- Women's Windy City Open 2015
- Metro Squash Windy City Open

Preceded by Tournament of Champions; United States (New York); 2015	PSA World Series 2015; Windy City Open; United States (Chicago); 2015	Succeeded by El Gouna International; Egypt (El Gouna); 2015
