= 2015 PSA World Series =

Squash tournaments

PSA World Series 2015

Details
- Event name: PSA World Series 2015
- Website psaworldtour.com/page/SuperSeriesRanking
- Year: World Tour 2015

The PSA World Series 2015 is a series of men's and women's squash tournaments which are part of the Professional Squash Association (PSA) World Tour for the start of 2015 squash season. The PSA World Series tournaments are some of the most prestigious events on the men's and women's tour.

== PSA World Series Ranking Points ==
PSA World Series events also have a separate World Series ranking. Points for this are calculated on a cumulative basis after each World Series event. The top eight players at the end of the calendar year are then eligible to play in the PSA World Series Finals.

Tournament			Ranking Points
Rank	Prize Money US$	Ranking Points	Winner	Runner up	3/4	5/8	9/16	17/32
World Series	$150,000-$350,000	625 points	100	65	40	25	15	10

== 2015 Men's PSA World Series ==
=== 2015 Men's Tournaments ===
Tournament	Country	Location	Rank	Prize money	Date	2015 Winner
Tournament of Champions 2015	United States	New York City	World Series	$150,000	16–23 January 2015	(Egypt) Mohamed El Shorbagy
Metro Squash Windy City Open 2015	United States	Chicago, Illinois	World Series	$150,000	26 February - 4 March 2015	(England) Nick Matthew
El Gouna International 2015	Egypt	El Gouna	World Series	$150,000	5–10 April 2015	(Egypt) Ramy Ashour
British Open 2015	England	Hull	World Series	$150,000	13–17 May 2015	(Egypt) Mohamed El Shorbagy

=== Men's World Series Standings 2015 ===
Performance Table Legend
10	1st Round	15	2nd Round
25	Quarterfinalist	40	Semifinalist
65	Runner-up	100	Winner

Top 16 Men's World Series Standings 2015
Rank	Player	Number of Tournament	Tournament of Champions	Windy City Open	El Gouna International	British Open	Total Points
Rank	Player	Number of Tournament	USA (United States)	USA (United States)	EGY (Egypt)	ENG (England)	Total Points
1	(Egypt) Mohamed El Shorbagy	4	100	65	65	100	330
2	(England) Nick Matthew	4	65	100	40	40	245
3	(France) Grégory Gaultier	4	25	40	40	65	170
4	(Colombia) Miguel Ángel Rodríguez	4	40	15	15	40	110
5	(Egypt) Ramy Ashour	1	-	-	100	-	100
6	(Egypt) Tarek Momen	4	25	25	10	25	85
7	(Egypt) Omar Mosaad	4	15	25	25	15	80
8	(England) Peter Barker	4	15	25	25	10	75
9	(Germany) Simon Rösner	4	25	10	10	25	70
10	(France) Mathieu Castagnet	4	15	10	15	25	65
11	(Egypt) Marwan El Shorbagy	3	-	40	10	15	65
12	(Egypt) Karim Abdel Gawad	4	10	25	15	15	65
13	(Egypt) Amr Shabana	3	40	15	10	-	65
14	(England) Daryl Selby	4	10	15	25	10	60
15	(India) Saurav Ghosal	4	15	15	15	10	55
16	(Australia) Cameron Pilley	4	15	15	10	10	50

== 2015 Women's PSA World Series ==
=== 2015 Women's Tournaments ===
Tournament	Country	Location	Rank	Prize money	Date	2015 Winner
Tournament of Champions 2015	United States	New York City	World Series	$118,000	19–23 January 2015	(Egypt) Raneem El Weleily
Metro Squash Windy City Open 2015	United States	Chicago, Illinois	World Series	$150,000	26 February - 4 March 2015	(Egypt) Raneem El Weleily
British Open 2015	England	Hull	World Series	$100,000	13–17 May 2015	(France) Camille Serme

=== Women's World Series Standings 2015 ===
Performance Table Legend
10	1st Round	15	2nd Round
25	Quarterfinalist	40	Semifinalist
65	Runner-up	100	Winner

Top 16 Women's World Series Standings 2015
Rank	Player	Number of Tournament	Tournament of Champions	Windy City Open	British Open	Total Points
Rank	Player	Number of Tournament	USA (United States)	USA (United States)	ENG (England)	Total Points
1	(Egypt) Raneem El Weleily	3	100	100	25	225
2	(France) Camille Serme	3	25	40	100	165
3	(Malaysia) Nicol David	3	25	65	40	130
4	(England) Laura Massaro	3	40	15	65	120
5	(England) Alison Waters	3	65	25	10	100
6	(Egypt) Nour El Sherbini	3	40	25	25	90
7	(Egypt) Nour El Tayeb	3	25	40	10	75
8	(England) Emma Beddoes	3	10	25	15	50
9	(Malaysia) Delia Arnold	2	-	10	40	50
10	(Hong Kong) Annie Au	3	15	15	15	45
11	(England) Victoria Lust	3	15	15	15	45
12	(Egypt) Omneya Abdel Kawy	3	15	10	10	40
13	(Australia) Rachael Grinham	3	15	15	10	40
14	(England) Sarah-Jane Perry	2	-	15	25	40
15	(Malaysia) Low Wee Wern	2	15	25	-	40
16	(Egypt) Heba El Torky	3	10	15	10	35

== See also ==
- PSA World Tour 2015
- Official Men's Squash World Ranking
- Official Women's Squash World Ranking
