= 2015 Men's British Open Squash Championship =

British Open
- 75th Men's British Open

Details
- Event name: Allam British Open 2015
- Location: (United Kingdom) Hull, England
- Venue: Sports Arena
- Dates: 11–17 May 2015
- Website www.britishopensquash.net

Men's Winner
- Category: World Series
- Prize money: $150,000
- Year: World Tour 2015

The Men's Allam British Open 2015 is the men's edition of the 2015 British Open Squash Championships, which is a PSA World Series event (Prize money : 150,000 $). The event took place at the Sports Arena in Hull in England from 11–17 May 2015. Mohamed El Shorbagy won his first British Open trophy, beating Grégory Gaultier in the final.

== Prize money and ranking points ==
For 2015, the prize purse was $150,000. The prize money and points breakdown is as follows:

Prize Money British Open (2015)
Event	W	F	SF	QF	2R	1R
Points (PSA)	2625	1725	1050	640	375	190
Prize money	$23,625	$15,525	$9,450	$5,740	$3,375	$1,690

== Seeds ==
1. (Egypt) Mohamed El Shorbagy (champion)
2. (France) Grégory Gaultier (final)
3. (England) Nick Matthew (semifinals)
4. (Colombia) Miguel Ángel Rodríguez (semifinals)
5. (Egypt) Tarek Momen (quarterfinals)
6. (England) Peter Barker (first round)
7. (Germany) Simon Rösner (quarterfinals)
8. (Egypt) Omar Mosaad (second round)

== Draw and results ==
1* 2* First round 3*
1	(Egypt) Mohd El Shorbagy	11	5	11	11
(England) James Willstrop	7	11	4	7
(India) Saurav Ghosal	9	9	6
(Spain) Borja Golán	11	11	11
(Egypt) Fares Dessouky	11	10	7	11	11
Q	(Egypt) Omar Abdel Meguid	2	12	11	7	5
Q	(England) Ben Coleman	5	5	7
7	(Germany) Simon Rösner	11	11	11
6	(England) Peter Barker	10	2	rtd
(France) Mathieu Castagnet	11	11
(Egypt) Marwan El Shorbagy	10	11	11	11
(Botswana) Alister Walker	12	6	5	5
(France) Grégoire Marche	11	13	11
Q	(Egypt) Mohamed Abouelghar	3	11	5
Q	(Netherlands) Laurens Jan Anjema	11	4	9	9
3	(England) Nick Matthew	6	11	11	11
4	(Colombia) Miguel Á. Rodríguez	12	11	11
(England) Chris Simpson	10	7	7
(Australia) Cameron Pilley	9	11	11	8	8
(Egypt) Karim Abdel Gawad	11	9	9	11	11
(South Africa) Stephen Coppinger	11	8	5	11	5
Q	(Egypt) Zahed Mohamed	8	11	11	3	11
WC	(England) Adrian Waller	12	9	5	5
5	(Egypt) Tarek Momen	10	11	11	11
8	(Egypt) Omar Mosaad	9	11	11	11
(Hong Kong) Max Lee	11	8	7	7
Q	(Hong Kong) Leo Au	3	6	11	12	6
(Egypt) Mazen Hesham	11	11	6	10	11
(England) Daryl Selby	10	11	1	5
Q	(England) Tom Richards	12	9	11	11
Q	(Malaysia) Mohd Nafiizwan Adnan	6	6	13
2	(France) Grégory Gaultier	11	11	15

1* Second round 2*
1	(Egypt) Mohd El Shorbagy	4	11	11	1	11
(Spain) Borja Golán	11	8	6	11	7
(Egypt) Fares Dessouky	9	4	14	11
7	(Germany) Simon Rösner	11	11	12	13
(France) Mathieu Castagnet	11	11	11
(Egypt) Marwan El Shorbagy	6	3	4
(France) Grégoire Marche	11	7	8	7
3	(England) Nick Matthew	7	11	11	11
4	(Colombia) Miguel Á. Rodríguez	11	11	11
(Egypt) Karim Abdel Gawad	4	2	4
Q	(Egypt) Zahed Mohamed	12	5	4	6
5	(Egypt) Tarek Momen	10	11	11	11
8	(Egypt) Omar Mosaad	12	5	11	7	7
(Egypt) Mazen Hesham	10	11	4	11	11
Q	(England) Tom Richards	3	1	7
2	(France) Grégory Gaultier	11	11	11

Quarter finals *
1	(Egypt) Mohd El Shorbagy	11	11	11
7	(Germany) Simon Rösner	6	6	5
(France) Mathieu Castagnet	7	7	7
3	(England) Nick Matthew	11	11	11
4	(Colombia) Miguel Á. Rodríguez	11	5	11	11
5	(Egypt) Tarek Momen	8	11	5	7
(Egypt) Mazen Hesham	7	7	9
2	(France) Grégory Gaultier	11	11	11

Semi finals *
1	(Egypt) Mohd El Shorbagy	11	11	5	11
3	(England) Nick Matthew	7	7	11	5
Final
1	(Egypt) Mohd El Shorbagy *	11	6	5	11	11
2	(France) Grégory Gaultier	9	11	11	8	5
4	(Colombia) Miguel Ángel Rodríguez	9	3	9
2	(France) Grégory Gaultier	11	11	11

== See also ==
- 2015 Men's World Open Squash Championship
- 2015 Women's British Open Squash Championship

Preceded by El Gouna International; Egypt (El Gouna); 2015	2015 PSA World Series; British Open; England (Hull); 2015	Succeeded by United States Open; United States (Philadelphia); 2015
