= 2015 Women's British Open Squash Championship =

British Open Squash Championships
- 85th Women's British Open

Details
- Event name: Allam British Open 2015
- Location: Hull, England
- Venue: Sports Arena
- Website britishopensquash.net

Women's Winner
- Category: World Series Platinum
- Prize money: $100,000
- Year: World Tour 2015

The Women's Allam British Open 2015 is the women's edition of the 2015 British Open Squash Championships, which is a PSA World Series event Platinum (Prize money: $100 000). The event took place at the Sports Arena in Hull in England from 11 May to 17 May. Camille Serme won her first British Open trophy, beating Laura Massaro in the final.

== Prize money and ranking points ==
For 2015, the prize purse was $100,000. The prize money and points breakdown is as follows:

Prize Money British Open (2015)
Event	W	F	SF	QF	2R	1R
Points (PSA)	4800	3300	1950	1050	525	300
Prize money	$14,450	$9,775	$5,740	$3,400	$1,910	$1,060

== Seeds ==
1. (Malaysia) Nicol David (semi-finals)
2. (Egypt) Raneem El Weleily (quarter-finals)
3. (England) Laura Massaro (final)
4. (Egypt) Nour El Sherbini (quarter-finals)
5. (England) Alison Waters (first round)
6. (France) Camille Serme (champion)
7. (Egypt) Nour El Tayeb (first round)
8. (Egypt) Omneya Abdel Kawy (first round)
9. (India) Dipika Pallikal (second round)
10. (New Zealand) Joelle King (quarter-finals)
11. (Hong Kong) Annie Au (second round)
12. (Australia) Rachael Grinham (first round)
13. (England) Sarah-Jane Perry (quarter-finals)
14. (England) Emma Beddoes (second round)
15. (England) Jenny Duncalf (first round)
16. (Egypt) Nouran Ahmed Gohar (second round)

== Draw and results ==
First round *
1	(Malaysia) Nicol David	11	11	7	11
Q	(Wales) Tesni Evans	2	4	11	9
(Netherlands) Natalie Grinham	wo
14	(England) Emma Beddoes
13	(England) Sarah-Jane Perry	5	11	11	11
(Egypt) Salma Hany Ibrahim	11	8	7	8
Q	(Australia) Donna Urquhart	5	11	12	7	11
7	(Egypt) Nour El Tayeb	11	7	10	11	5
8	(Egypt) Omneya Abdel Kawy	4	8	11
WC	(England) Victoria Lust	11	11	13
Q	(United States) Sabrina Sobhy	8	9	4
10	(New Zealand) Joelle King	11	11	11
16	(Egypt) Nouran Gohar	11	11	9	11
Q	(Canada) Samantha Cornett	7	6	11	7
(India) Joshna Chinappa	11	13	8	5
3	(England) Laura Massaro	13	11	11	11
4	(Egypt) Nour El Sherbini	11	7	11	9	11
(Egypt) Heba El Torky	2	11	2	11	4
Q	(South Africa) Siyoli Waters	11	7	11	0	16
15	(England) Jenny Duncalf	6	11	8	11	14
9	(India) Dipika Pallikal	9	11	11	9	11
(England) Emily Whitlock	11	8	7	11	4
(Hong Kong) Joey Chan	4	5	11	5
6	(France) Camille Serme	11	11	4	11
5	(England) Alison Waters	8	5	4
Q	(Malaysia) Delia Arnold	11	11	11
(Guyana) Nicolette Fernandes	11	6	3	10
11	(Hong Kong) Annie Au	8	11	11	12
12	(Australia) Rachael Grinham	9	5	14	8
Q	(Egypt) Yathreb Adel	11	11	12	11
Q	(Denmark) Line Hansen	6	5	11	11
2	(Egypt) Raneem El Weleily	11	11	7	13

1* Second round 2*
1	(Malaysia) Nicol David	11	9	11	11
14	(England) Emma Beddoes	9	11	8	5
13	(England) Sarah-Jane Perry	11	11	7	11
Q	(Australia) Donna Urquhart	5	7	11	6
WC	(England) Victoria Lust	5	7	2
10	(New Zealand) Joelle King	11	11	11
16	(Egypt) Nouran Ahmed Gohar	9	9	11	1
3	(England) Laura Massaro	11	11	8	11
4	(Egypt) Nour El Sherbini	11	11	11
Q	(South Africa) Siyoli Waters	2	8	5
9	(India) Dipika Pallikal	5	3	2
6	(France) Camille Serme	11	11	11
Q	(Malaysia) Delia Arnold	7	11	12	11
11	(Hong Kong) Annie Au	11	8	10	9
Q	(Egypt) Yathreb Adel	5	5	10
2	(Egypt) Raneem El Weleily	11	11	12

Quarter finals *
1	(Malaysia) Nicol David	11	11	12
13	(England) Sarah-Jane Perry	6	8	10
10	(New Zealand) Joelle King	6	2	7
3	(England) Laura Massaro	11	11	11
4	(Egypt) Nour El Sherbini	11	7	11	9	9
6	(France) Camille Serme	6	11	7	11	11
Q	(Malaysia) Delia Arnold	4	16	10	11	12
2	(Egypt) Raneem El Weleily	11	14	12	6	10

Semi-finals *
1	(Malaysia) Nicol David	11	11	9	10	8
3	(England) Laura Massaro	5	9	11	12	11
Final
3	(England) Laura Massaro	3	5	11	8
6	(France) Camille Serme *	11	11	8	11
6	(France) Camille Serme	11	11	11
Q	(Malaysia) Delia Arnold	3	7	6

== See also ==
- 2015 PSA World Series
- 2015 Men's British Open

Preceded by Windy City Open; United States (Chicago); 2015	2015 PSA World Series; British Open; England (Hull); 2015	Succeeded by United States Open; USA (Philadelphia); 2015
