= Arshad Iqbal Burki =

Pakistani squash player (born 1984)

Arshad Iqbal Burki (born 15 March 1984 in Peshawar) is a Pakistani squash player. Burki is a former Pakistan national squash champion and an Asian junior team gold medalist. His highest world ranking was #52 in January 2004.
