= Men's Tournament of Champions 2015 =

Squash championship

- 81st Tournament of Champions

Details
- Event name: J. P. Morgan Tournament of Champions 2015
- Location: New York City United States
- Venue: Grand Central Terminal
- Website www.tocsquash.com

Men's Winner
- Category: World Series Gold
- Prize money: $150,000
- Year: World Tour 2015

The Men's J. P. Morgan Tournament of Champions 2015 is the men's edition of the 2015 Tournament of Champions, which is a PSA World Series event (Prize money : 150 000 $). The event took place at the Grand Central Terminal in New York City in the United States from 16 January to 23 January. Mohamed El Shorbagy won his first Tournament of Champions trophy, beating Nick Matthew in the final.

== Prize money and ranking points ==
For 2015, the prize purse was $150,000. The prize money and points breakdown is as follows:

Prize Money Tournament of Champions (2015)
Event	W	F	SF	QF	2R	1R
Points (PSA)	2625	1725	1050	640	375	190
Prize money	$23,625	$15,525	$9,450	$5,740	$3,375	$1,690

== Seeds ==
1. (Egypt) Mohamed El Shorbagy (champion)
2. (France) Grégory Gaultier (quarterfinals)
3. (England) Nick Matthew (final)
4. (Egypt) Amr Shabana (semifinals)
5. (England) Peter Barker (second round)
6. (Spain) Borja Golán (quarterfinals)
7. (Egypt) Tarek Momen (quarterfinals)
8. (Germany) Simon Rösner (quarterfinals)

== Draw and results ==
1* 2* First round 3* 4*
1	(Egypt) Mohd El Shorbagy	11	11	11
WC	(United States) Todd Harrity	6	7	8
Q	(New Zealand) Campbell Grayson	11	3	4	9
(Switzerland) Nicolas Müller	9	11	11	11
(England) Chris Simpson	11	8	10	13	11
Q	(Mexico) César Salazar	5	11	12	11	6
Q	(Malaysia) Ong Beng Hee	14	11	6	5	8
6	(Spain) Borja Golán	12	9	11	11	11
7	(Egypt) Tarek Momen	11	11	14
(England) Adrian Waller	5	7	12
Q	(Scotland) Alan Clyne	7	5	10
(India) Saurav Ghosal	11	11	12
(Egypt) Karim Abdel Gawad	10	13	8	10
(Australia) Cameron Pilley	12	11	11	12
(Finland) Olli Tuominen	7	4	3
4	(Egypt) Amr Shabana	11	11	11
3	(England) Nick Matthew	12	11	7	11
(England) Daryl Selby	10	3	11	6
Q	(Egypt) Mohamed Abouelghar	3	11	3	4
(Egypt) Omar Mosaad	11	8	11	11
(France) Mathieu Castagnet	11	11	3	11
Q	(Peru) Diego Elías	3	7	11	5
(South Africa) Stephen Coppinger	12	4	7	10
8	(Germany) Simon Rösner	10	11	11	12
5	(England) Peter Barker	11	11	11
(France) Grégoire Marche	6	5	3
Q	(England) Joe Lee	10	4	7
(Colombia) Miguel Á. Rodríguez	12	11	11
(Botswana) Alister Walker	6	6	5
Q	(England) Tom Richards	11	11	11
(Hong Kong) Max Lee	1	7	2
2	(France) Grégory Gaultier	11	11	11

1* Second round 2* 3*
1	(Egypt) Mohd El Shorbagy	11	5	15	11
(Switzerland) Nicolas Müller	3	11	13	6
(England) Chris Simpson	wo
6	(Spain) Borja Golán
7	(Egypt) Tarek Momen	11	11	6	12
(India) Saurav Ghosal	4	8	11	10
(Australia) Cameron Pilley	8	6	11	9
4	(Egypt) Amr Shabana	11	11	5	11
3	(England) Nick Matthew	7	15	11	13
(Egypt) Omar Mosaad	11	13	6	11
(France) Mathieu Castagnet	13	5	5	6
8	(Germany) Simon Rösner	11	11	11	11
5	(England) Peter Barker	6	11	13	9	7
(Colombia) Miguel Á. Rodríguez	11	8	11	11	11
Q	(England) Tom Richards	6	5	3
2	(France) Grégory Gaultier	11	11	11

1* Quarter finals 2*
1	(Egypt) Mohd El Shorbagy	11	11	11
6	(Spain) Borja Golán	7	9	8
7	(Egypt) Tarek Momen	6	19	8	9
4	(Egypt) Amr Shabana	11	17	11	11
3	(England) Nick Matthew	10	11	11	11
8	(Germany) Simon Rösner	12	4	7	6
(Colombia) Miguel Á. Rodríguez	11	14	8	11	11
2	(France) Grégory Gaultier	13	12	11	8	9

Semi finals *
1	(Egypt) Mohd El Shorbagy	9	11	5	11	11
4	(Egypt) Amr Shabana	11	8	11	9	7
Final
1	(Egypt) Mohd El Shorbagy *	5	11	11	12
3	(England) Nick Matthew	11	9	8	10
3	(England) Nick Matthew	11	11	11
(Colombia) Miguel Á. Rodríguez	7	9	5

== See also ==
- 2015 PSA World Tour
- Women's Tournament of Champions 2015
- Tournament of Champions (squash)

Preceded by World Championship; Qatar (Doha); 2014	PSA World Series 2015; Tournament of Champions; USA (New York); 2015	Succeeded by Windy City Open; United States (Chicago); 2015
