= Women's Tournament of Champions 2015 =

Tournament of Champions 2015
- 11th Women's Tournament of Champions

Details
- Event name: Tournament of Champions 2015
- Location: New York City United States
- Venue: Grand Central Terminal
- Website www.tocsquash.com

Men's Winner
- Category: World Series
- Prize money: $118,000
- Year: World Tour 2015

The Women's Tournament of Champions 2015 is the women's edition of the 2015 Tournament of Champions, which is a PSA World Series event (prize money: 118 000 $). The event took place at the Grand Central Terminal in New York City in the United States from 19 January to 23 January. Raneem El Weleily won her first Tournament of Champions trophy, beating Alison Waters in the final.

== Prize money and ranking points ==
For 2015, the prize purse was $118,000. The prize money and points breakdown is as follows:

Prize money Tournament of Champions (2015)
Event	W	F	SF	QF	1R
Points (PSA)	4100	2800	1675	900	450
Prize money	$21,470	$14,690	$9,605	$5,930	$3,390

== Seeds ==
1. (Malaysia) Nicol David (quarterfinals)
2. (England) Laura Massaro (semifinals)
3. (Egypt) Raneem El Weleily (champion)
4. (Egypt) Nour El Sherbini (semifinals)
5. (England) Alison Waters (final)
6. (France) Camille Serme (quarterfinals)
7. (Malaysia) Low Wee Wern (first round)
8. (Egypt) Nour El Tayeb (quarterfinals)

== Draw and results ==
1* 2* First round 3*
1	(Malaysia) Nicol David	6	11	11	11
(Australia) Rachael Grinham	11	6	5	7
Q	(Mexico) Samantha Terán	11	6	3	5
5	(England) Alison Waters	6	11	11	11
8	(Egypt) Nour El Tayeb	11	11	11
Q	(England) Victoria Lust	5	6	2
(Hong Kong) Annie Au	3	7	7
4	(Egypt) Nour El Sherbini	11	11	11
3	(Egypt) Raneem El Weleily	11	15	11
(Egypt) Omneya Abdel Kawy	7	13	7
(United States) Amanda Sobhy	11	5	6	11	11
7	(Malaysia) Low Wee Wern	7	11	11	8	7
6	(France) Camille Serme	9	11	11	12
Q	(Egypt) Kanzy Emad El Defrawy	11	3	5	10
Q	(Egypt) Salma Hany Ibrahim	4	4	3
2	(England) Laura Massaro	11	11	11

1* Quarter finals 2*
1	(Malaysia) Nicol David	9	12	7	1
5	(England) Alison Waters	11	10	11	11
8	(Egypt) Nour El Tayeb	5	12	3	14	9
4	(Egypt) Nour El Sherbini	11	10	11	12	11
3	(Egypt) Raneem El Weleily	11	11	2	11
(United States) Amanda Sobhy	5	5	11	4
6	(France) Camille Serme	11	11	7	7	7
2	(England) Laura Massaro	3	4	11	11	11

Semi finals *
5	(England) Alison Waters	8	12	5	11	13
4	(Egypt) Nour El Sherbini	11	10	11	9	11
3	(Egypt) Raneem El Weleily	11	11	11	11
2	(England) Laura Massaro	7	2	13	6

Final
5	(England) Alison Waters	11	10	4	4
3	(Egypt) Raneem El Weleily *	9	12	11	11

== See also ==
- 2015 PSA World Tour
- Men's Tournament of Champions 2015
- Tournament of Champions (squash)
