= Jonathon Power =

Canadian squash player

Personal information
- Full name: Jonathon Tyler Power
- Nickname: The Magician
- Born: August 9, 1974 (age 52) Comox, British Columbia
- Height: 1.83 m (6 ft 0 in)
- Weight: 82 kg (181 lb)

Sport
- Country: Canada
- Handedness: Right handed
- Turned pro: 1991
- Coached by: Mike Way
- Retired: 2006
- Racquet used: Harrow, Dunlop

Men's singles
- Highest ranking: No. 1 (May, 1999)
- Title: 36
- Tour final: 58
- World Open: W (1998)
Medal record
Men's squash
Representing Canada
World Championships
Gold medal – first place	1998 Doha	Singles
Bronze medal – third place	2002 Antwerp	Singles
World Team Championships
Silver medal – second place	1997 Petaling Jaya	Team
Commonwealth Games
Gold medal – first place	2002 Manchester	Singles
Silver medal – second place	1998 Kuala Lumpur	Singles
Pan American Games
Silver medal – second place	1995 Mar del Plata	Singles
- Updated on September 19, 2010

Jonathon Tyler Power (born August 9, 1974) is a Canadian retired professional squash player. In 1999, he became the first North American squash player to reach the World No. 1 ranking. He won 36 top-level squash events during his career, including the World Open in 1998, and the British Open in 1999.

== Career overview ==
Power began playing squash at the age of seven and turned professional at age 16. After joining the Professional Squash Association (PSA) Tour in May 1991, he went on to win 36 PSA tournaments, and appeared in 58 finals. Career highlights included winning the World Open (1998), the British Open (1999), the Super Series Finals (2003 & 2005), the PSA Masters (2001, 2002 & 2005), the Tournament of Champions (1996, 1999, 2000 & 2002), and the men's singles Gold Medal at the 2002 Commonwealth Games.

In January 2006, Power returned to the World No. 1 ranking, four-and-a-half years after the previous time he was ranked in the top spot (marking the longest gap between periods of holding the World No. 1 ranking of any player in history). He lost the No. 1 ranking in February 2006 to David Palmer, but regained it again on 1 March 2006. One day later, on 2 March, Power announced his retirement from professional squash. His wife, Sita, gave birth to their daughter named Parker on January 23, 2007.

Power played for Canada at the 2007 and 2009 World Team Championships. He defeated several highly ranked players and showed he was still competitive at world level. He also won the 2008 Canadian Championships, defeating Shahier Razik in the final.

== World Open final appearances ==
Wins (1)
Year	Opponent in final	Score in final
1998	Peter Nicol	15–11, 15–12, 15–12

== British Open final appearances ==
Wins (1)
Year	Opponent in final	Score in final
1999	Peter Nicol	15–17, 15–12 (retired)

== Commonwealth Games final appearances ==
Wins (1)
Year	Opponent in final	Score in final
2002	Peter Nicol	9–4, 4–9, 9–3, 9–0
Runners-up (1)
Year	Opponent in final	Score in final
1998	Peter Nicol	3–9, 9–2, 9–1, 2–9, 9–2

Sporting positions
Preceded by Peter Nicol; Peter Nicol; Peter Nicol; Thierry Lincou; David Palmer	World No. 1 May 1999 - September 1999; November 1999 - January 2000; April 2001 - July 2001; January 2006; March 2006	Succeeded by Peter Nicol; Peter Nicol; Peter Nicol; David Palmer; Amr Shabana
