= Stefan Casteleyn =

Belgian squash player (born 1974)

Personal information
- Born: February 25, 1974 (age 52) Brussels, Belgium

Sport
- Country: Belgium
- Handedness: Right Handed
- Turned pro: 1993
- Retired: October 2015
- Racquet used: Feather

Men's singles
- Highest ranking: No. 7 (December, 1999)
Medal record
Men's squash
Representing Belgium
World Championships
Bronze medal – third place	1998 Doha	Singles
- Updated on December 22, 2009

Stefan Casteleyn (born February 25, 1974, in Brussels) is a professional squash player who represented Belgium. He is the 1998 Men's World Open Squash Championships bronze medalist. He reached a career-high world ranking of World No. 7 in December 1999.

He married fellow Belgian squash player Kim Hannes in 2014.
