= El Gouna International 2015 =

- 4th El Gouna International

Details
- Event name: El Gouna International Squash Open 2015
- Location: El Gouna Egypt
- Venue: Abu Tig Marina
- Website www.elgounasquashopen.com

Men's Winner
- Category: World Series
- Prize money: $150,000
- Year: World Tour 2015

The El Gouna International 2015 is the men's edition of the 2015 El Gouna International, which is a PSA World Series event Gold (Prize money : 150 000 $). The event took place at the Abu Tig Marina in El Gouna in Egypt from 5 April to 10 April. Ramy Ashour won his third El Gouna International trophy, beating Mohamed El Shorbagy in the final.

== Prize money and ranking points ==
For 2015, the prize purse was $150,000. The prize money and points breakdown is as follows:

Prize Money El Gouna International (2015)
Event	W	F	SF	QF	2R	1R
Points (PSA)	2625	1725	1050	640	375	190
Prize money	$23,625	$15,525	$9,450	$5,740	$3,375	$1,690

== Seeds ==
1. (Egypt) Mohamed El Shorbagy (final)
2. (France) Grégory Gaultier (semifinals)
3. (England) Nick Matthew (semifinals)
4. (Egypt) Ramy Ashour (champion)
5. (Egypt) Amr Shabana (first round)
6. (Colombia) Miguel Ángel Rodríguez (second round)
7. (Egypt) Tarek Momen (first round)
8. (England) Peter Barker (quarterfinals)

== Draw and results ==
1* 2* First round 3* 4*
1	(Egypt) Mohd El Shorbagy	11	13	11
Q	(Egypt) Ali Farag	9	11	5
Q	(Egypt) Mazen Hesham	12	11	11	11
(Germany) Simon Rösner	10	7	13	7
(Hong Kong) Max Lee	7	8	11	11	11
Q	(Malaysia) Mohd Nafiizwan Adnan	11	11	5	5	8
(England) Adrian Waller	5	7	3
8	(England) Peter Barker	11	11	11
7	(Egypt) Tarek Momen	10	1	11	14	9
(India) Saurav Ghosal	12	11	7	12	11
Q	(Finland) Olli Tuominen	5	8	1
(Egypt) Omar Mosaad	11	11	11
(France) Mathieu Castagnet	7	6	11	12	11
Q	(Egypt) Omar Abdel Meguid	11	11	5	10	9
WC	(Egypt) Zahed Mohamed	7	6	6
3	(England) Nick Matthew	11	11	11
4	(Egypt) Ramy Ashour	10	11	11	11
(Egypt) Marwan El Shorbagy	12	8	6	6
Q	(Hong Kong) Leo Au	5	4	7
(Egypt) Fares Dessouky	11	11	11
(England) James Willstrop	4	14	11	11
(South Africa) Stephen Coppinger	11	12	7	8
(England) Chris Simpson	5	7	11	11	11
5	(Egypt) Amr Shabana	11	11	5	4	5
6	(Colombia) Miguel Á. Rodríguez	11	11	11
Q	(Egypt) Karim Ali Fathi	5	2	11
(Switzerland) Nicolas Müller	11	9	9	14	8
(England) Daryl Selby	8	11	11	12	11
(Egypt) Karim Abdel Gawad	13	8	11	3	11
Q	(Egypt) Mohamed Abouelghar	11	11	9	11	7
(Australia) Cameron Pilley	12	7	4	4
2	(France) Grégory Gaultier	10	11	11	11

1* Second round 2*
1	(Egypt) Mohd El Shorbagy	8	11	11	11
Q	(Egypt) Mazen Hesham	11	5	6	6
(Hong Kong) Max Lee	2	13	5
8	(England) Peter Barker	11	15	11
(India) Saurav Ghosal	4	3	11	8
(Egypt) Omar Mosaad	11	11	9	11
(France) Mathieu Castagnet	11	5	5	5
3	(England) Nick Matthew	6	11	11	11
4	(Egypt) Ramy Ashour	6	11	11	11
(Egypt) Fares Dessouky	11	8	7	8
(England) James Willstrop	11	6	11	11
(England) Chris Simpson	8	11	6	6
6	(Colombia) Miguel Á. Rodríguez	8	11	13	9	4
(England) Daryl Selby	11	9	11	11	11
(Egypt) Karim Abdel Gawad	8	8	3
2	(France) Grégory Gaultier	11	11	11

1* Quarter finals 2*
1	(Egypt) Mohd El Shorbagy	11	11	11
8	(England) Peter Barker	7	8	9
(Egypt) Omar Mosaad	11	4	9	10
3	(England) Nick Matthew	8	11	11	12
4	(Egypt) Ramy Ashour	11	14	9	11
(England) James Willstrop	7	12	11	4
(England) Daryl Selby	4	3	1
2	(France) Grégory Gaultier	11	11	11

Semi finals *
1	(Egypt) Mohd El Shorbagy	6	6
3	(England) Nick Matthew	11	3	rtd
Final
1	(Egypt) Mohamed El Shorbagy	9	6	11	12	10
4	(Egypt) Ramy Ashour *	11	11	4	10	12
4	(Egypt) Ramy Ashour	7	11	11	11
2	(France) Grégory Gaultier	11	9	9	9

== See also ==
- El Gouna International
- PSA World Series 2015

Preceded by Windy City Open; United States (Chicago); 2015	PSA World Series 2015; El Gouna International; Egypt (El Gouna); 2015	Succeeded by British Open; England (Hull); 2015
