= Kashif Shuja =

New Zealand squash player (born 1979)

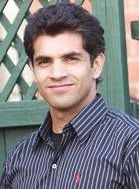

Personal information
- Born: 20 July 1979 (age 47) Abbottabad, Pakistan
- Height: 1.77 m (5 ft 10 in)
- Weight: 77 kg (170 lb)
- Website: www.kashifshuja.blogspot.com

Sport
- Country: New Zealand Pakistan
- Handedness: Right Handed
- Turned pro: 2005
- Retired: Active
- Racquet used: Salming Forza

Men's singles
- Highest ranking: No. 36 (April 2009)
- Titles: 5 National & 11 International
- Updated on December 2017

Kashif Shuja, (Urdu: کاشف شجاع; born 20 July 1979 in Abbottabad, Pakistan) is a New Zealand former professional squash player.

== Biography ==
Kashif Shuja is a Pakistan-born Kiwi from Taupō, New Zealand. Kashif was national junior champion of Pakistan and represented his country of birth in the Asian and World Junior Championships winning gold and bronze medals. He also represented Pakistan at the Commonwealth Games in 1998. He was ranked 5 in the national men's ranking list which was then led by the legendary Jansher Khan.

Kashif graduated in Information Technology from Singapore and shifted residence to New Zealand in 2001 where he worked for the University of Auckland for 3 years. He turned pro at the end of 2005 when he led New Zealand in the World Men's Team Championships in Islamabad, Pakistan. Kashif won 5 National Championships maintaining his top ranking in New Zealand for 5 consecutive years from 2004 to 2009. Kashif is a winner of 11 PSA World Tour titles - including the Spanish Open in 2009, the South Australian and Swiss Opens in 2011 and the PSA Manawatu Classic in New Zealand in 2014. His best PSA World series results were top 16 in the British and World Opens and a top 10 placing for New Zealand at the World Men's Teams Championships in Denmark 2009.

In 2015 Kashif won the New Zealand Masters Open in Napier as well as the National Champion of Champions title at home in Palmerston North. Kashif added a World Masters Games gold medal in the over 35s age category to his lit of titles in Auckland in April 2017. The same year, he was appointed coach of the New Zealand men for the World Team Championships in France. The team finished 6th - NZ's highest placing in over 25 years.

He won his 11th national title - O40 masters in Whangarei 2020 to become one of the most decorated squash player in New Zealand. After hip surgery in November 2020, Kashif has made a successful return to tournaments, taking out the Hawkes Bay Easter Open as well as the Havelock North Open. He continues to play and coach squash in Taupō and travels frequently to tournaments around the country.
