= Lars Harms (squash player) =

Swiss squash player (born 1977)

Personal information
- Born: 13 September 1977 (age 48) Basel, Switzerland

Sport
- Country: Switzerland
- Handedness: Right Handed
- Turned pro: 2000
- Racquet used: Wilson

Men's singles
- Highest ranking: No. 41 (September 2002)
- Updated on June 2018

Lars Harms (born 13 September 1977 in Basel) is a Swiss former professional squash player. He reached a career-high world ranking of 41 in September 2002.
