= Tom Pashley =

English squash player (born 1988)

Personal information
- Born: 14 April 1988 (age 38) Cuckfield, England

Sport
- Country: England
- Handedness: Left Handed
- Turned pro: 2006
- Retired: yes
- Racquet used: Black Knight

Men's singles
- Highest ranking: No. 105 (October 2010)
- Updated on June 2018

Tom Pashley (born 14 April 1988 in Cuckfield) is an English former professional squash player. He reached a career-high world ranking of 105 in October 2010.
