= Liam Kenny =

Irish squash player (born 1977)

Personal information
- Nationality: Australian/Irish
- Born: 2 November 1977 (age 48) Perth, Western Australia
- Height: 1.83 m (6 ft 0 in)
- Weight: 82 kg (181 lb)

Sport
- Turned pro: 1996
- Coached by: Eoin Ryan
- Retired: 2009
- Racquet used: Dunlop

Men's singles
- Highest ranking: No. 31 (April 2007)
Medal record
Irish Championships
Gold medal – first place	2001, 2004–08	singles

Liam Kenny (born 2 November 1977) is an Australian-born former professional squash player who represented Ireland by virtue of having dual residency. He reached a career-high world ranking of World No. 31 in April 2007 and won six Irish national titles from 2001 to 2008.

== Biography ==
Kenny represented the Irish national team for the European Team Championship from 2001 to 2008 as well as the World Team Championship in 2001, 2003, 2005 and 2007.

Kenny won his first national title in 2001 and his sixth and last national title in 2008.

In 2018, he won a World Masters title (40+ division).
