= University Club of Chicago =

Private social club in Illinois, US

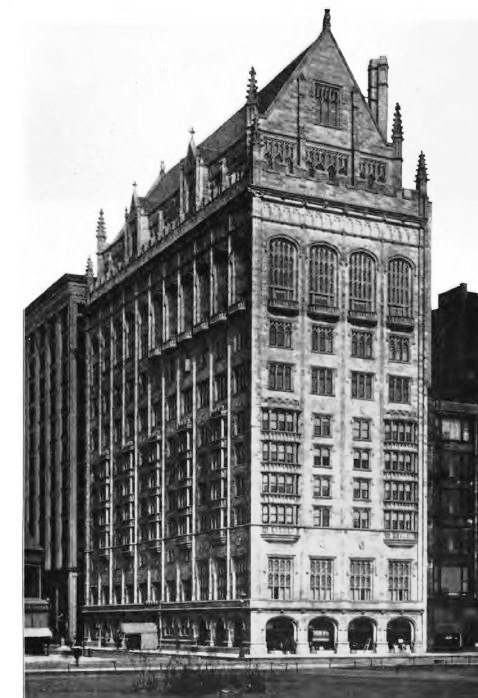
- The building shortly after completion in 1909

General information
- Architectural style: Gothic Revival architecture
- Location: Chicago
- Construction started: 1907
- Topped-out: 1909
- Opened: 1909; 117 years ago

Design and construction
- Architect: Martin Roche

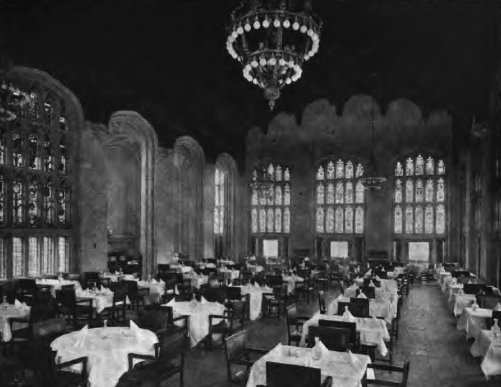
The dining room, 1909

The University Club of Chicago is a private social club located at 76 East Monroe Street at the corner of Michigan Avenue & Monroe Street in downtown Chicago, Illinois. It received its charter in 1887, when a group of college friends, principally alumni of Harvard, Yale, and Princeton, founded the club hoping to further their collegial ties and enjoy intellectual pursuits.

The club operates under laws for 501(c)(7) Social and Recreation Clubs; in 2024 it claimed total revenue of $32,845,428 and total assets of $44,272,256. The University Club Foundation at the same address is a 501(c)(3) Public Charity. In 2025 it claimed total revenue of $637,977, total giving of $405,683, and total assets of $3,750,468.

== History ==
It was officially chartered in 1887 by university graduates for "the promotion of literature and art, by establishing and maintaining a library, reading room and gallery of art, and by such other means as shall be expedient and proper for such purposes." The University Club of Chicago's history began in 1885 when a group of Harvard men formed an association of college alumni in a similar fashion to the University Club of New York.

== Building ==
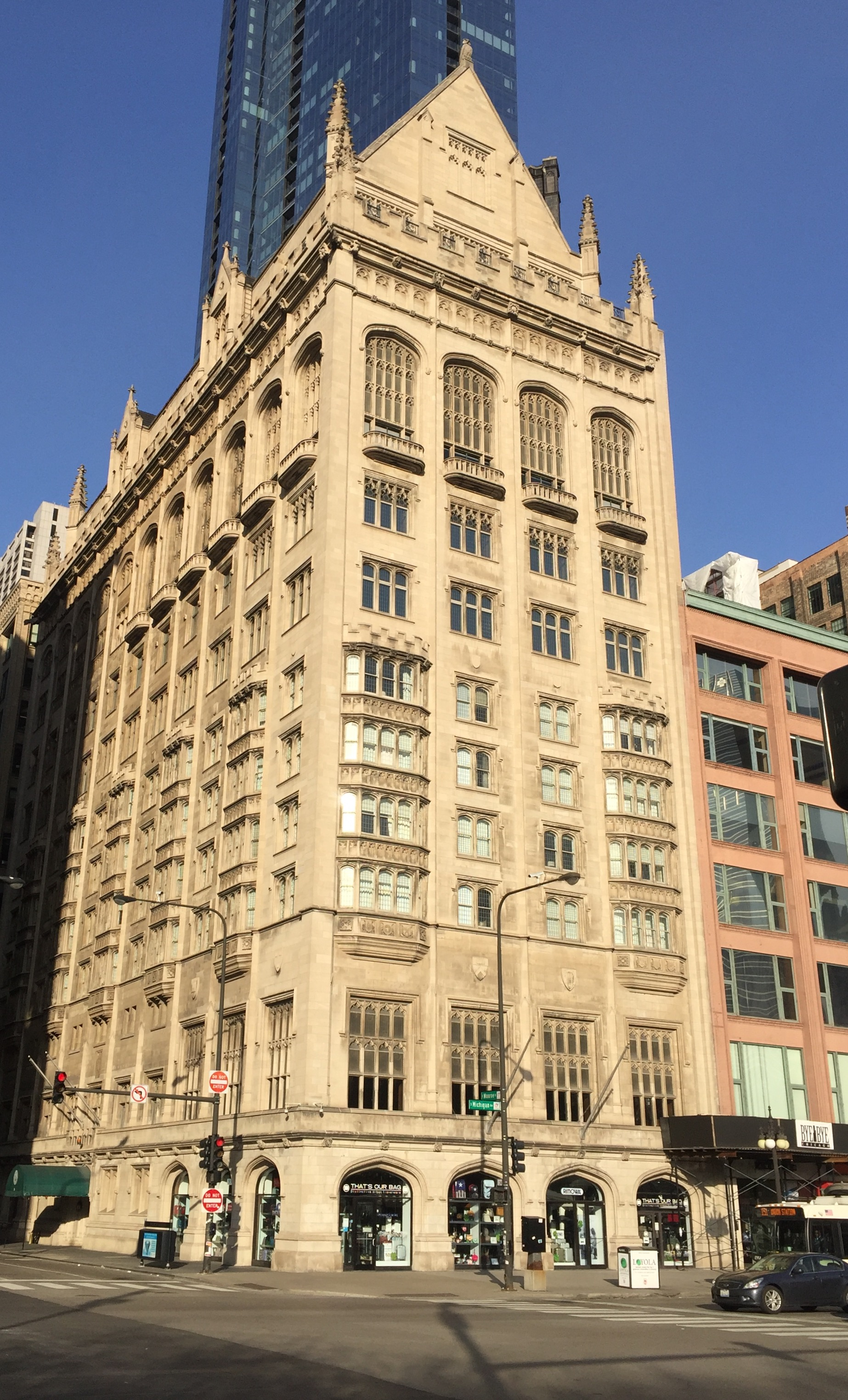
University Club, February 2017

The club's first home was on the third and fourth floors of the Henning & Speed Building at 22 West Madison Street. The second club home was a stand-alone building at 30 North Dearborn. The first committee on literature and art was established in 1895, the library in 1897 with 1000 volumes. Honored guests included Admiral George Dewey (1900) and Winston Churchill (1901).

The club's present building, begun in 1907 and completed in 1909, is a historic landmark designed by architect Martin Roche. At a cost of over $1.1 million (over 39.4 million in 2025), it was one of the club buildings of its day.

The club's centerpiece, Cathedral Hall, was based by Roche on Crosby Hall in London. It is adorned with stained glass windows by artist Frederic Clay Bartlett and seals representing distinguished universities in the United States and Europe, including Harvard, Yale, Princeton, Brown, Columbia and Northwestern. According to one writer:

There are other historically great interiors in town: Auditorium Theater of Adler & Sullivan and Mies van der Rohe's Crown Hall are only two of the first to come to mind. But among places where people convene to enjoy good food and companionship, I can think of no single room in this wonderfully composed and constructed city that is more stunning, that clears the sinuses more speedily or whips the viewer more persuasively into social attention than Martin Roche's Cathedral Hall.

In 2014, the club purchased the neighboring 32 Michigan Avenue building, and expanded their facilities, including adding a new restaurant.

Other club facilities include: private dining rooms, restaurants, squash courts, bath department and pool, fitness facilities, library, business center, outdoor terrace, art gallery, and overnight accommodations available to members and their guests. The club has played a key role in the development of squash in Chicago and the U.S., including hosting the annual Windy City Open each year.

== See also ==
- List of American gentlemen's clubs
