= Tommy Berden =

Dutch squash player (born 1979)

Personal information
- Born: 22 April 1979 (age 47) Hilversum, Netherlands
- Spouse: Natalie Grinham

Sport
- Country: Netherlands
- Handedness: right-handed
- Racquet used: Head

men's singles
- Highest ranking: 22 (December 2001)

Tommy Berden (born 22 April 1979) is a retired Dutch professional squash player and an entrepreneur. He achieved his highest career ranking of 22 in December 2001.

== Career ==
Tommy Berden was crowned as the European Junior Squash champion in 1998 before becoming a renowned professional squash player.

He has won eight PSA World Tour titles in his career including PSA World Tour title wins came in 2001 at the Australian Open, Kuala Lumpur Open Squash Championships and Motor City Open which led to improve his record career singles ranking of 22 in the same year. Tommy Berden retired from playing in professional squash tournaments in late 2006 at the age of 27 due to undergoing surgeries in his playing hand (right-handed) to repair snapped tendons and decided to take part in event management of PSA World Tours.

== Personal life ==
He married fellow popular Dutch squash player, Natalie Grinham in March 2006 who has represented both Netherlands and Australia at the international level. His wife, Natalie Grinham achieved her highest career ranking of World No.2 position in women's singles in February 2007.

Both Tommy and Natalie became the first husband and wife team to win a joint championship in squash after winning the respective trophies at the inaugural edition of the Tranzparanz Open in June 2006 which was held in Almere, Netherlands.

== Career with PSA ==
After his retirement in 2006, he is currently serving as the Chief commercial officer of the Professional Squash Association. He has been seen as a promoter for several squash championships and also played a key role in collaborating both men's and women's PSA World Tours from 2011.

He was also later appointed as the CEO of the Women's Squash Association in 2014 for his great efforts in developing and improving women's squash tournaments.
