= Andy Whipp =

English squash player (born 1981)

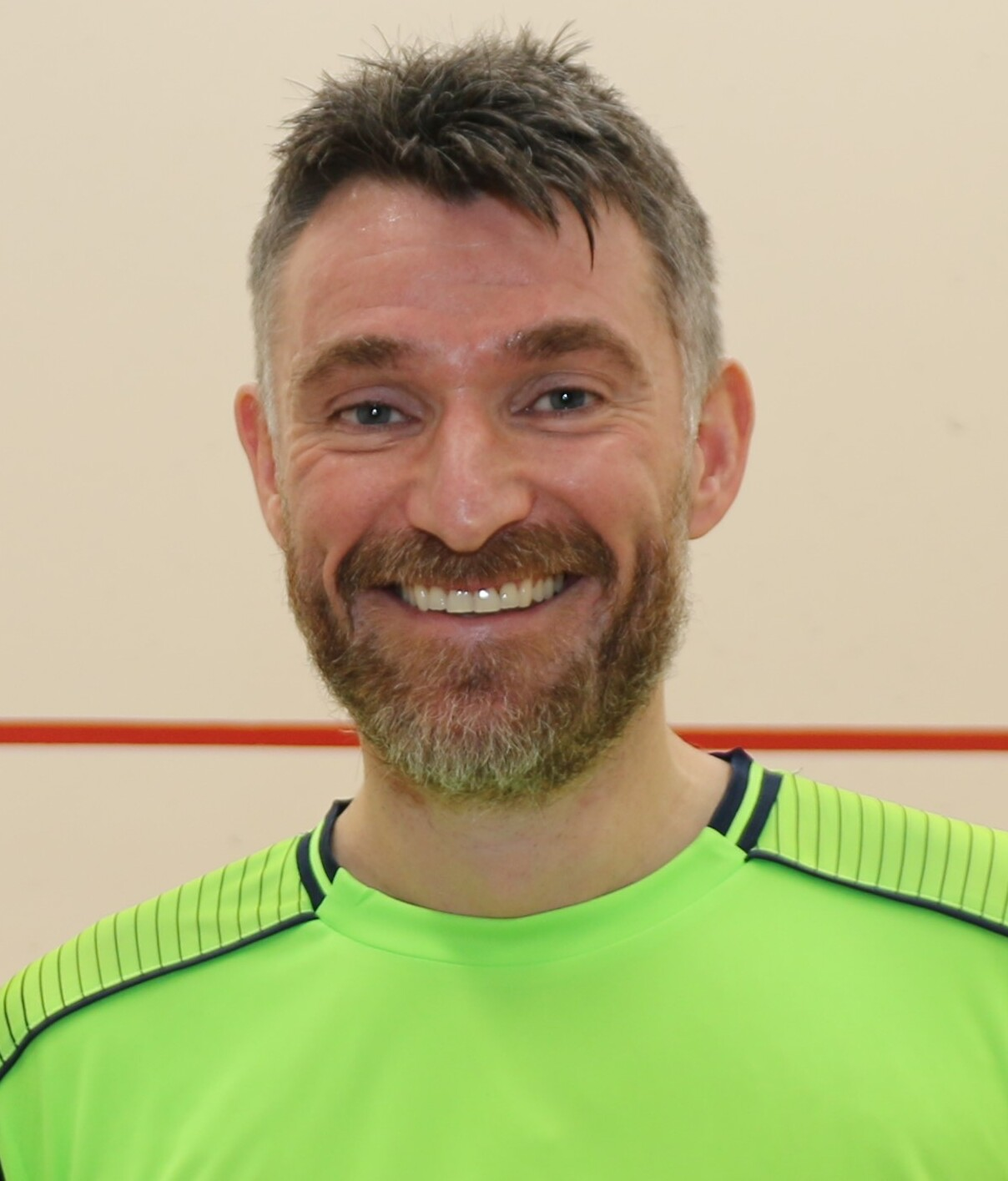
- Andy Whipp (2022)

Personal information
- Full name: Andrew Whipp
- Born: 11 March 1981 (age 45) Leamington Spa, England
- Height: 175 cm (5 ft 9 in)
- Children: Lucy Whipp, Alice Whipp

Sport
- Country: England
- Turned pro: 2000
- Coached by: Phil Whitlock, David Campion
- Retired: yes

Men's singles
- Highest ranking: No. 64 (June 2003)
- Title: 2
- Tour final: 7
- Updated on June 2018

Andy Whipp (born 11 March 1981 in Leamington Spa) is an English former professional squash player. He reached a career-high world ranking of 64 in June 2003. He competed multiple times in the World Open and the British Open.
