= Lee Drew =

English squash player, coach and admin

Personal information
- Born: 30 May 1976 (age 50) Truro, Cornwall, England
- Height: 1.83 m (6 ft 0 in)

Sport
- Country: England
- Handedness: Left-handed
- Turned pro: 1993
- Highest ranking: No. 45 (September 2003)
- Title: 1
- Tour final: 5
- Updated on July 2026

Lee Drew (born 30 May 1976) is an English former professional squash player, coach and sports administrator. He reached a career-high world ranking of 45 in September 2003 and competed in the main draw of the World Open in 2002 and 2003. After retiring from the professional tour, he spent twelve years as national junior coach at England Squash, served as the first Referee Director of the Professional Squash Association (PSA), and was Head of World Squash Officiating (WSO) from 2023 to 2026.

== Playing career ==
Drew, a left-handed player from Truro, Cornwall, began playing squash at the age of four and represented England as a junior international before joining the PSA in 1993. He is based in Colchester and is attached to Essex at county level. On the PSA World Tour he won one title, at the Snowflake Open in Dartmouth, and reached four further finals, the last two of them at the Italian Open and the Wolverhampton Open. He achieved his highest world ranking of 45 on 1 September 2003. He appeared in the main draw of the World Open in 2002 and 2003.

== Coaching career ==
After retiring from competition, Drew moved into coaching and joined England Squash, where he worked as national junior coach for twelve years until May 2021. During his tenure, England junior teams achieved podium finishes at the World Team Championships, World Individual Championships, British Junior Open and European Team Championships, including a silver medal at the 2018 WSF World Junior Team Championships and six consecutive European under-19 team gold medals. He was named England Squash and Racketball Elite Coach of the Year. Drew has also produced instructional coaching video series for the online coaching platform SquashSkills, and wrote a regular coaching analysis column, "Drew's Diagnosis", for Squash Player magazine.

== Officiating and broadcasting ==
In January 2014, the PSA appointed Drew as its first Referee and Refereeing Director, a role in which he developed a video database of match clips intended to standardise the interpretation of the rules among referees and players. He has also worked as a television commentator on the PSA World Tour's SQUASHTV broadcasts.

Drew was involved in World Squash Officiating, a joint officiating programme of the World Squash Federation and the PSA, from its launch in 2021, and became its head in July 2023. Under his leadership, WSO appointed squash's first full-time professional referees, expanded support for female referees, and grew its training platform to more than 14,500 users across 135 countries, with 44 partner federations. He stepped down from the role at the end of January 2026 to return to coaching.
