= Stacey Ross =

English squash player (born 1973)

Personal information
- Born: 21 October 1973 (age 52) London, England

Sport
- Country: England
- Handedness: Right handed
- Turned pro: 2001
- Retired: 2008
- Racquet used: Prince

Men's singles
- Highest ranking: No. 39 (June 2007)
- Title: 1
- Tour final: 2
- Updated on June 2018

Stacey Ross (born 21 October 1973 in London) is an English former professional squash player. He won his first professional tournament in May 2005 and reached a career-high world ranking of 39 in June 2007. He competed multiple times in the British Open. He is currently director of squash at the Wimbledon Club.
