= Joey Barrington =

English squash player and commentator

Personal information
- Born: 18 January 1980 (age 46) Solihull, England
- Height: 1.84 m (6 ft 0 in)
- Weight: 78 kg (172 lb)

Sport
- Country: England
- Turned pro: 2001
- Coached by: Jonah Barrington
- Retired: 2012
- Racquet used: Dunlop

Men's singles
- Highest ranking: 24 (January 2007)
Medal record
Men's squash
Representing England
European Team Championships
Gold medal – first place	2008 Amsterdam	Team

Joey Barrington (born 18 January 1980) is a former professional squash player from England. He reached a career high ranking of 24 in the world during January 2007. He is the son of the squash player Jonah Barrington.

== Biography ==
Barrington attended Millfield and studied Sport and Exercise Science at Birmingham University, graduating in 2000.

Barrington won a gold medal for the England men's national squash team at the 2008 European Squash Team Championships.

He is currently the lead commentator for the PSA World Tour.
