= John White (squash player) =

Squash player

Personal information
- Nicknames: Great White, The Rocket, and The Legend
- Nationality: Australian/Scottish
- Born: 15 June 1973 (age 53) Mount Isa, Queensland, Australia
- Height: 1.86 m (6 ft 1 in)

Sport
- Handedness: Right-Handed
- Racquet used: Prince O3 Black

Men's Singles
- Highest ranking: 1 (March 2004)
- Title: 13
- Tour final: 32
- World Open: F (2002)
Medal record
Men's squash
Representing Scotland
World Championships
Silver medal – second place	2002 Antwerp	Singles

John White (born 15 June 1973) is a former squash player who represented Australia and Scotland at international level, he was ranked world number one and reached the World Championship final in 2002.

== Career overview ==
White finished runner-up at both the World Open and the British Open in 2002. White was twice the winner of the Scottish National Championships in 1998 and 2000.

He won the PSA Masters title in 2003 (beating Thierry Lincou in the final 15–8, 17–15, 17–16). He also won the British National Championships in 2004 (beating Lee Beachill in the final 17–16, 17–14, 14–15, 15–8). White reached the World No. 1 ranking in March 2004.

In 2006 he represented the Scottish team at the 2006 Commonwealth Games in Melbourne, Australia, where he competed in the squash events reaching the quarter-finals of the singles and doubles.

White was known as the hardest hitter of the ball in the sport of squash. Quite frequently, he achieved speeds of over 165 miles per hour (266 km/h). One of his shots was clocked at 172 miles per hour, a record until 3 October 2011 when Cameron Pilley hit a shot that was recorded at 175 miles per hour. White was brought up in Australia, but represented Scotland in international squash.

In 2007, White was appointed Director of Squash and head squash coach at Franklin & Marshall College in Lancaster, Pennsylvania. He retired from the PSA tour after losing to James Willstrop in the second round of World Squash Championships in 2008. In 2011, White was appointed as the head coach of the varsity men's and women's squash teams at Drexel University in Philadelphia, Pennsylvania.

== World Open final appearances ==
=== 0 title & 1 runner-up ===
Outcome	Year	Location	Opponent in the final	Score in the final
Runner-up	2002	Antwerp, Belgium	(Australia) David Palmer	13–15, 12–15, 15–6, 15–14, 15–11

== Major World Series final appearances ==
=== British Open: 1 final (0 title, 1 runner-up) ===
Outcome	Year	Opponent in the final	Score in the final
Runner-up	2002	(England) Peter Nicol	15–9, 15–8, 15–8

=== Qatar Classic: 1 finals (0 title, 1 runner-up) ===
Outcome	Year	Opponent in the final	Score in the final
Runner-up	2003	(England) Lee Beachill	15–12, 15–5, 11–15, 12–15, 15–9

Sporting positions
Preceded by Thierry Lincou	World No. 1 March 2004 – April 2004	Succeeded by Peter Nicol
