= Davide Bianchetti =

Italian squash player (born 1977)

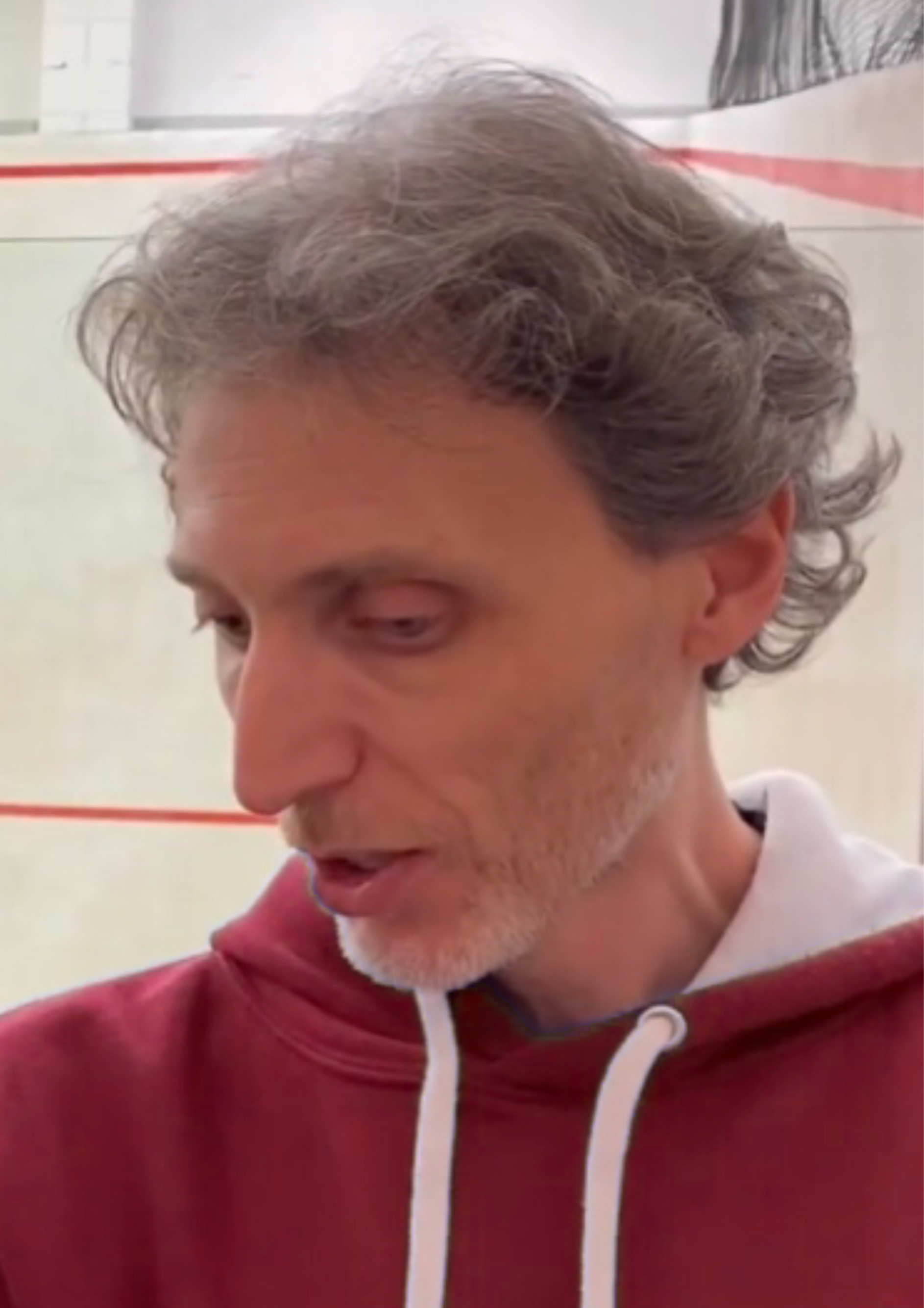
- Davide Bianchetti (2021)

Personal information
- Born: 8 March 1977 (age 49) Brescia, Italy
- Height: 6 ft 1 in (1.85 m)
- Weight: 74 kg (163 lb)

Sport
- Country: Italy
- Handedness: Right Handed
- Turned pro: 1996
- Coached by: Hesham El Attar
- Retired: 2012
- Racquet used: Dunlop

Men's singles
- Highest ranking: No. 24 (October 2004)
- World Open: QF (2003)
- Updated on 19 December 2011

Davide Bianchetti (born 8 March 1977 in Brescia) is a professional squash player who represents Italy. He reached a career-high world ranking of World No. 24 in October 2004.
