= 2017 in squash sport =

This article lists the results for the sport of Squash in 2017.

== 2016–17 PSA World Series ==
- August 23 – 28: 2016 Hong Kong Open for Men and Women in Hong Kong
  - Men: (Egypt) Ramy Ashour defeated (Egypt) Karim Abdel Gawad, 11–9, 8–11, 11–6, 5–11, 11–6, to win his third Hong Kong Open title.
  - Women: (Egypt) Nouran Gohar defeated (United States) Amanda Sobhy, 6–11, 12-10, 11–7, 11–8, to win her first Hong Kong Open title.
- October 6 – 15: 2016 US Open for Men and Women in (United States) Philadelphia
  - Men: (Egypt) Mohamed El Shorbagy defeated (England) Nick Matthew, 10–12, 12–14, 11–1, 11–4, 3–0 (Retired), to win his second US Open title.
  - Women: (France) Camille Serme defeated (Egypt) Nour El Sherbini, 11–8, 7–11, 12–10, 11–9, to win her first US Open title.
- November 13 – 18: 2016 Qatar Classic in Doha
  - (Egypt) Karim Abdel Gawad defeated fellow Egyptian, Mohamed El Shorbagy, 12–10, 15–13, 11–7, to win his first Qatar Classic title.
- January 12 – 19: 2017 Tournament of Champions for Men and Women in (United States) New York City
  - Men: (Egypt) Karim Abdel Gawad defeated (France) Grégory Gaultier, 6–11, 11–6, 12–10, 11–6, to win his first Tournament of Champions title.
  - Women: (France) Camille Serme defeated (England) Laura Massaro, 13–11, 8–11, 4–11, 11–3, 11–7, to win her first Tournament of Champions title.
- February 23 – March 1: Windy City Open for Men and Women in (United States) Chicago
  - Men: (France) Grégory Gaultier defeated (Egypt) Marwan El Shorbagy, 5–11, 11–8, 11–2, 11–4, to win his second Windy City Open title.
  - Women: (Egypt) Raneem El Weleily defeated fellow Egyptian, Nour El Sherbini, 10–12, 11–7, 11–7, 11–7, to win her third consecutive Windy City Open title.
- March 20 – 26: British Open for Men and Women in (England) Hull
  - Men: (France) Grégory Gaultier defeated (England) Nick Matthew, 8-11, 11-7, 11-3, 11-3, to win his third British Open title.
  - Women: (England) Laura Massaro defeated fellow English woman, Sarah-Jane Perry, 11-8, 11-8, 6-11, 11-6, to win her second British Open title.
- April 9 – 14: El Gouna International in (Egypt) El Gouna
  - (France) Grégory Gaultier defeated (Egypt) Karim Abdel Gawad, 11-6, 11-8, 11-7, to win his first El Gouna International title.
- June 6 – 10: PSA World Series Finals in (United Arab Emirates) Dubai
  - Men: (Egypt) Mohamed El Shorbagy defeated (England) James Willstrop, 12–10, 11–9, 11–8, to win his first Men's PSA World Series Finals title.
  - Women: (England) Laura Massaro defeated (Egypt) Nour El Sherbini, 11–8, 12–10, 11–5, to win her second consecutive Women's PSA World Series Finals title.

== World squash championships ==
- April 7 – 14: 2016 Women's World Open Squash Championship in (Egypt) El Gouna
  - (Egypt) Nour El Sherbini defeated fellow Egyptian, Raneem El Weleily, 11–8, 11–9, 11–9, to win her second consecutive Women's World Open Squash Championship title.
- July 19 – 24: 2017 World Junior Squash Championships in (New Zealand) Tauranga
  - Men: (Egypt) Marwan Tarek defeated (France) Victor Crouin, 11–9, 3–11, 11–6, 3–11, 11–2, to win his first World Junior Squash Championships title.
  - Women: (Egypt) Rowan Reda Araby defeated fellow Egyptian, Hania El Hammamy, 11–7, 11–9, 11–8, to win her first World Junior Squash Championships title.
- July 25 – 29: 2017 Women's World Junior Team Championship in (New Zealand) Tauranga
  - Egypt defeated Malaysia, 2–0 in matches played, to win their sixth consecutive and eighth overall Women's World Junior Team Championship title.
- August 1 – 5: 2017 World Doubles Squash Championships in Manchester
  - Men: Australia (Ryan Cuskelly & Cameron Pilley) defeated Scotland (Alan Clyne & Greg Lobban), 11–6 & 11–3, in the final.
  - Women: New Zealand (Joelle King & Amanda Landers-Murphy) defeated England (Jenny Duncalf & Alison Waters), 9–11, 11–1, & 11–10, in the final.
  - Mixed: New Zealand (Joelle King & Paul Coll) defeated England (Alison Waters & Daryl Selby), 11–8, 9–11, & 11–6, in the final.
- September 21 – 24: 2017 World Hardball Doubles Squash Championships in (United States) St. Louis
  - Men: England (Clive Leach & John Russell) defeated Canada (Thomas Brinkman & Robin Clarke), 15–10, 15–10, 3–15, 7–15, 15–14, in the final.
  - Women: England (Suzie Pierrepont & Georgina Stoker) defeated Australia (Narelle Krizek & Natarsha McElhinny), 12–15, 15–11, 15–3, 15–7, in the final.
- November 27 – December 3: 2017 Men's World Team Squash Championships in (France) Marseille
  - Egypt defeated England, 11–9, 11–3, 11–7 & 11–5, 11–9, 11–5, to win their fourth Men's World Team Squash Championships title.
- December 10 – 17: 2017 World Squash Championships in (England) Manchester
  - Men: (Egypt) Mohamed El Shorbagy defeated fellow Egyptian, Marwan El Shorbagy, 11–5, 9–11, 11–7, 9–11, 11–6, to win his first World Squash Championships title.
  - Women: (Egypt) Raneem El Weleily defeated fellow Egyptian, Nour El Sherbini, 3–11, 12–10, 11–7, 11–5, to win her first World Squash Championships title.

== Other squash events ==
- February 1 – 5: 18th Asian Junior Squash Team Championships in Hong Kong
  - Boys: India defeated Malaysia, 2–0. Hong Kong took third place.
  - Girls: Malaysia defeated Hong Kong, 2–0. Japan took third place.
- February 6 – 11: South American Junior Squash Championship in (Paraguay) Asunción
  - U11 winners: (Colombia) Juan Antonio Irisarri (m) / (Guatemala) Tabita Gaitán (f)
  - U13 winners: (Ecuador) Javier Romo (m) / (Ecuador) María Emilia Falconí (f)
  - U15 winners: (Ecuador) David Costales (m) / (Ecuador) María Caridad Buenaño (f)
  - U17 winners: (Peru) Rafael Gálvez (m) / (Ecuador) María Paula Moya (f)
  - U19 winners: (Colombia) Ronald Palomino (m) / (Colombia) María Paula Tovar (f)
  - Doubles: (Guatemala) Alejandro Enríquez & (Guatemala) Ricardo Toscano (m) / (Colombia) Sophia Giraldo & (Colombia) María Paula Tovar (f)
  - Mixed: (Paraguay) Francesco Marcantonio & (Paraguay) Luján Palacios
- March 10 – 12: 2nd Balkan Junior & 1st Individual Championships in (Serbia) Belgrade
  - Winners: (Slovenia) Martin Mosnik (m) / (Croatia) Paulina Radoš (f)
  - Juniors winners: (Croatia) Ivan Krznaric (m) / (Turkey) Zaynep Kabakçi (f)
- April 4 – 7: European Team Championships Div 3 in Saint Helier
  - Men's: Slovakia defeated Poland, 3–0. Jersey took third place.
  - Women's: Round Robin: 1st. Malta; 2nd. Russia; 3rd. Jersey
- April 8 – 16: European Junior U19 Individual & Team Championships in (Portugal) Lisbon
  - Individual men's winners: 1. (France) Victor Crouin; 2. (England) Kyle Finch; 3. (Switzerland) Roman Allinckx
  - Individual women's winners: 1. (Spain) Cristina Gomez; 2. (England) Elise Lazarus; (England) Lucy Turmel
  - Teams winners: 1. England; 2. Spain 3. Czech Republic
- April 14 – 17: Oceania Junior Championships in (New Zealand) Auckland
  - U11 winners: (New Zealand) Matthew Growcott (b) / (New Zealand) Maia Smales (g)
  - U13 winners: (Singapore) Edward Boon Hwi Thng (b) / (New Zealand) Natalie Sayes (g)
  - U15 winners: (New Zealand) Leo Fatialofa (b) / (Australia) Sze Yu Lee (g)
  - U17 winners: (New Zealand) Matthew Lucente (b) / (New Zealand) Rhiarne Taiapa (g)
  - U19 winners: (New Zealand) Finn Trimble (b) / (New Zealand) Kaitlyn Watts (g)
- April 26 – 29: European Team Championship Div. 1 & 2 in (Finland) Helsinki
  - Men's Division 1: France defeated England, 3–0. Germany and Scotland took third and fourth places.
  - Men's Division 2: Ireland defeated Netherlands, 2–1. Wales and Denmark took third and fourth places.
  - Women's Division 1: England defeated France, 2–0. Wales and Netherlands took third and fourth places.
  - Women's Division 2: Germany defeated Switzerland, 2–0. Scotland and Austria took third and fourth places.
- April 26 – 30: 2017 Asian Individual Squash Championships for Men's and Women's in (India) Chennai
  - Men's: In the final, (Hong Kong) Max Lee defeated (India) Saurav Ghosal, 3–1 (5–11, 11–4, 11–8, 11–7).
  - Women's: In the final, (India) Joshana Chinappa defeated (India) Dipika Pallikal, 3–2 (13–15, 12–10, 11–13, 11–4, 11–4).
- May 11 – 14: European Junior U15/U17 Team Championships in (Czech Republic) Prague
  - U15 winners: England
  - U17 winners: England
- TBD for May: South American Championship in (Argentina) Buenos Aires
- August 15 – 19: 2017 Asian Junior Squash Individual Championships in (Jordan) Amman
  - U13 winners: (Malaysia) Joachim Chuah Han Wen (b) / (Malaysia) Aira Azman (g)
  - U15 winners: (Malaysia) Muhammad Amir Amirul Bin Azhar (b) / (Malaysia) Jessica Keng Jiai Hui (g)
  - U17 winners: (Malaysia) Siow Yee Xian (b) / (Hong Kong) Chan Sin Yuk (g)
  - U19 winners: (Jordan) Mohammad Al-Sarraj (b) / (Japan) Satomi Watanabe (g)
- August 30 – September 2: European Masters Individual Championships in (Poland) Wrocław
  - +35 winners: (Germany) Heiko Schwarzer (m) / (England) Lauren Briggs (f)
  - +40 winners: (Sweden) Christian Drakenberg (m) / (England) Keeley Johnson (f)
  - +45 winners: (Sweden) Christian Borgvall (m) / (Germany) Simone Korell (f)
  - +50 winners: (Sweden) Fredrik Johnson (m) / (France) Mylene de Muylder (f)
  - +55 winners: (England) Mark Woodliffe (m) / (Scotland) Fiona McLean (f)
  - +60 winners: (England) Mark Cowley (m) / (England) Julie Field (f)
  - +65 winners: (Scotland) John Rae (Men's only)
  - +70 winners: (Scotland) Ian Ross (m) / (England) Ann Manley (f)
  - +75 winners: (Finland) Bertil Walli (Men's only)
- September 13 – 16: European Club Championships in (Germany) Paderborn
- September 16 – 22: Oceania Team Championships and Oceania Individual Championships in (French Polynesia) Papeete
- September 22 – 24: 8th Balkan Team Championships in (Croatia) Zagreb
