= 2016–17 PSA World Series =

Details
- Event name: 2016–17 PSA World Series
- Website; PSA World Series standings
- Year: PSA World Tour 16–17

The PSA World Series 2016–17 is a series of men's and women's squash tournaments which are part of the Professional Squash Association (PSA) World Tour for the end of the 2016 and the start of the 2017 squash season. The PSA World Series tournaments are some of the most prestigious events on the men's and women's tour. The best-performing players in the World Series events qualify for the annual 2017 Men's PSA World Series Finals and 2017 Women's PSA World Series Finals tournament.

== PSA World Series Ranking Points ==
PSA World Series events also have a separate World Series ranking. Points for this are calculated on a cumulative basis after each World Series event. The top eight players at the end of the calendar year are then eligible to play in the PSA World Series Finals.

Tournament			Ranking Points
Rank	Prize Money US$	Ranking Points	Winner	Runner up	3/4	5/8	9/16	17/32
World Series	$150,000-$350,000	625 points	100	65	40	25	15	10

== Men's ==
=== Tournaments ===
Tournament	Country	Location	Rank	Prize money	Date	2016–17 Winner
Hong Kong Open 2016	Hong Kong	Hong Kong	World Series	$150,000	23–28 August 2016	(Egypt) Ramy Ashour
US Open 2016	United States	Philadelphia	World Series	$150,000	8–15 October 2016	(Egypt) Mohamed El Shorbagy
Qatar Classic 2016	Qatar	Doha	World Series	$150,000	13–18 November 2016	(Egypt) Karim Abdel Gawad
Tournament of Champions 2017	United States	New York City	World Series	$150,000	12–19 January 2017	(Egypt) Karim Abdel Gawad
Windy City Open 2017	United States	Chicago	World Series	$150,000	23 February–1 March 2017	(France) Grégory Gaultier
British Open 2017	England	Hull	World Series	$150,000	20–26 March 2017	(France) Grégory Gaultier
El Gouna International 2017	Egypt	El Gouna	World Series	$150,000	9–14 April 2017	(France) Grégory Gaultier

=== Standings ===
Performance Table Legend
10	1st Round	15	2nd Round
25	Quarterfinalist	40	Semifinalist
65	Runner-up	**100**	Winner

**Top 16 Men's World Series Standings 2016–17**
Rank	Player	Number of Tournament	Hong Kong Open	US Open	Qatar Classic	Tournament of Champions	Windy City Open	British Open	El Gouna International	Total Points
Rank	Player	Number of Tournament	HKG (Hong Kong)	USA (United States)	QAT (Qatar)	USA (United States)	USA (United States)	ENG (England)	EGY (Egypt)	Total Points
1	(Egypt) **Karim Abdel Gawad**	7	65	40	**100**	**100**	25	15	65	**410**
2	(France) **Grégory Gaultier**	6	15	25	–	65	**100**	**100**	**100**	**405**
3	(Egypt) **Mohamed El Shorbagy**	7	15	**100**	65	40	25	40	25	**310**
4	(Egypt) **Marwan El Shorbagy**	7	15	25	25	25	65	10	40	**205**
5	(England) **Nick Matthew**	5	–	65	40	15	–	65	10	**195**
6	(England) **James Willstrop**	7	25	40	15	40	25	10	15	**170**
7	(Germany) **Simon Rösner**	7	25	15	25	25	25	15	25	**155**
8	(Egypt) Ramy Ashour*	3	**100**	–	–	–	15	40	–	**155**
9	(Egypt) **Ali Farag**	6	15	25	–	15	40	25	10	**130**
10	(Egypt) Fares Dessouky	6	25	15	–	15	15	10	40	**120**
11	(Australia) Ryan Cuskelly	7	40	10	15	15	10	10	15	**115**
12	(Australia) Cameron Pilley	7	25	10	25	15	10	15	15	**115**
13	(Egypt) Mohamed Abouelghar	7	15	15	10	10	15	25	15	**100**
14	(Hong Kong) Max Lee	6	40	15	10	10	10	15	–	**100**
15	(New Zealand) Paul Coll	6	–	15	10	25	10	15	25	**100**
16	(Egypt) Tarek Momen	6	15	–	15	25	10	25	10	**100**

Bold – Players qualified for the final

(*) - did not qualify to finals due to have not played enough World Series tournaments.

Final tournament	Country	Location	Prize money	Date	2016–17 World Series Champion
PSA World Series Finals 2017	United Arab Emirates	Dubai	$160,000	6–10 June 2017	(Egypt) Mohamed El Shorbagy

== Women's ==
=== Tournaments ===
Tournament	Country	Location	Rank	Prize money	Date	2016–17 Winner
Hong Kong Open 2016	Hong Kong	Hong Kong	World Series	$115,000	23–28 August 2016	(Egypt) Nouran Gohar
US Open 2016	United States	Philadelphia	World Series	$150,000	8–15 October 2016	(France) Camille Serme
Tournament of Champions 2017	United States	New York City	World Series	$150,000	12–19 January 2017	(France) Camille Serme
Windy City Open 2017	United States	Chicago	World Series	$150,000	23 February - 1 March 2017	(Egypt) Raneem El Weleily
British Open 2017	England	Hull	World Series	$150,000	20–26 March 2017	(England) Laura Massaro

=== Standings ===
Performance Table Legend
10	1st Round	15	2nd Round
25	Quarterfinalist	40	Semifinalist
65	Runner-up	**100**	Winner

**Top 16 Women's World Series Standings 2016–17**
Rank	Player	Number of Tournament	Hong Kong Open	US Open	Tournament of Champions	Windy City Open	British Open	Total Points
Rank	Player	Number of Tournament	HKG (Hong Kong)	USA (United States)	USA (United States)	USA (United States)	ENG (England)	Total Points
1	(France) **Camille Serme**	5	25	**100**	**100**	40	25	**290**
2	(Egypt) **Nour El Sherbini**	5	40	65	40	65	40	**250**
3	(England) **Laura Massaro**	5	25	25	65	25	**100**	**240**
4	(Egypt) **Raneem El Weleily**	5	15	40	25	**100**	25	**205**
5	(Egypt) **Nouran Gohar**	5	**100**	25	25	40	10	**200**
6	(Malaysia) **Nicol David**	5	40	25	25	25	40	**155**
7	(England) **Sarah-Jane Perry**	5	15	15	40	15	65	**150**
8	(United States) Amanda Sobhy*	4	65	40	15	25	–	**145**
9	(England) **Alison Waters**	5	15	25	10	25	15	**90**
10	(England) Emily Whitlock	5	15	15	10	15	25	**80**
10	(Egypt) Nour El Tayeb	5	25	15	15	10	15	**80**
12	(Hong Kong) Annie Au	5	15	15	15	15	15	**75**
13	(Australia) Donna Urquhart	5	10	15	10	10	25	**70**
14	(India) Joshna Chinappa	5	15	15	15	10	15	**70**
15	(New Zealand) Joelle King	5	15	15	15	10	10	**65**
16	(Hong Kong) Joey Chan	5	10	10	10	15	15	**60**
16	(Wales) Tesni Evans	5	10	10	10	15	15	**60**

Bold – Players qualified for the final

(*) - Did not play Finals due to an injury.

Final tournament	Country	Location	Prize money	Date	2016–17 World Series Champion
PSA World Series Finals 2017	United Arab Emirates	Dubai	$160,000	6–10 June 2017	(England) Laura Massaro

== See also ==
- 2016 PSA World Tour
- 2017 PSA World Tour
- Official Men's Squash World Ranking
- Official Women's Squash World Ranking
