= 2020–21 PSA World Tour Finals =

2020–21 PSA World Tour

Details
- Event name: 2020–21 PSA World Tour Finals
- Location: Cairo
- Venue: Mall of Arabia
- Website; PSA World Tour standings
- Year: 2020–21 PSA World Tour

The 2020–21 PSA World Tour is a series of men's and women's squash tournaments which are part of the Professional Squash Association (PSA) PSA World Tour from August 2020 until July 2021. The PSA World Tour tournaments are some of the most prestigious events on the men's and women's tour. The best-performing players in the World Tour events qualify for the annual Men's and Women's Finals.

Starting in August 2018, PSA replaced World Series tournaments with new PSA World Tour, comprising four new tournament-tiers: Platinum ($164,500–$180,500), Gold ($100,000–$120,500), Silver ($70,000–$88,000) and Bronze ($51,000–$53,000) each one awarding different points.

== PSA World Tour Ranking Points ==
PSA World Tour events also have a separate World Tour ranking. Points for this are calculated on a cumulative basis after each World Tour event. The top eight players at the end of the calendar year are then eligible to play in the PSA World Tour Finals.

Ranking points vary according to tournament tier being awarded as follows:

| Tournament | | | Ranking Points |
|---|---|---|---|---|---|---|---|---|---|
| Rank | Prize Money US$ | Ranking Points | Winner | Runner up | 3/4 | 5/8 | 9/16 | 17/32 | 33/48 |
| World Championship | $500,000 | 25045 points | 3175 | 2090 | 1270 | 780 | 475 | 290 | 177.5 |
| Platinum | $164,500–$180,500 | 19188 points | 2750 | 1810 | 1100 | 675 | 410 | 250 | 152.5 |
| Gold | $100,000–$120,500 | 10660 points | 1750 | 1150 | 700 | 430 | 260 | 160 |
| Silver | $75,000–$88,000 | 7470 points | 1225 | 805 | 490 | 300 | 182.5 | 112.5 |
| Bronze | $47,500–$55,000 | 5330 points | 875 | 575 | 350 | 215 | 130 | 80 |

== Men's ==
=== Tournaments ===
| Tournament | Country | Location | Rank | Prize money | Date | Winner |
|---|---|---|---|---|---|---|
| Manchester Open | England | Manchester | Silver | $85,000 | 16–22 September 2020 | (Egypt) Mohamed El Shorbagy |
| CIB Egyptian Squash Open | Egypt | Cairo | Platinum | $270,000 | 10–17 October 2020 | (Egypt) Ali Farag |
| Qatar Classic | Qatar | Doha | Platinum | $175,000 | 1–7 November 2020 | (Egypt) Ali Farag |
| CIB Black Ball Squash Open | Egypt | New Cairo | Gold | $112,500 | 13–18 December 2020 | (Egypt) Fares Dessouky |
| CIB Black Ball Squash Open | Egypt | New Cairo | Platinum | $175,000 | 19–25 March 2021 | (Egypt) Marwan El Shorbagy |
| El Gouna International | Egypt | El Gouna | Platinum | $181,500 | 20–28 May 2021 | (Egypt) Mohamed El Shorbagy |

=== Standings ===
World Championship
| 177.5 | 1st Round | 290 | 2nd Round |
| 475 | 3rd Round | 780 | Quarterfinalist |
| 1270 | Semifinalist | 2090 | Runner-up |
| **3175** | Winner | | |

Platinum
| 152.5 | 1st Round | 250 | 2nd Round |
| 410 | 3rd Round | 675 | Quarterfinalist |
| 1100 | Semifinalist | 1810 | Runner-up |
| **2750** | Winner | | |

Gold
| 160 | 1st Round | 260 | 2nd Round |
| 430 | Quarterfinalist | 700 | Semifinalist |
| 1150 | Runner-up | **1750** | Winner |

Silver
| 112.5 | 1st Round | 182.5 | 2nd Round |
| 300 | Quarterfinalist | 490 | Semifinalist |
| 805 | Runner-up | **1225** | Winner |

Bronze
| 80 | 1st Round | 130 | 2nd Round |
| 215 | Quarterfinalist | 350 | Semifinalist |
| 575 | Runner-up | **875** | Winner |

Top 16 Men's PSA World Tour Standings 2020–21
| Rank | Player | Tournaments Played | ENG (England) | EGY (Egypt) | QAT (Qatar) | EGY (Egypt) | EGY (Egypt) | EGY (Egypt) | Total Points |
|---|---|---|---|---|---|---|---|---|---|
| 1 | (Egypt) **Ali Farag** | 5 | 300 | **2750** | **2750** | 1150 | 675 | DNP | 7625 |
| 2 | (Egypt) Fares Dessouky‡ | 6 | 182.5 | 250 | 1100 | **1750** | 1810 | 1100 | 6192.5 |
| 3 | (Egypt) **Tarek Momen** | 6 | 300 | 1810 | 1100 | 700 | 1100 | 1100 | 6110 |
| 4 | (New Zealand) **Paul Coll** | 6 | 490 | 675 | 1810 | 260 | 675 | 1810 | 5720 |
| 5 | (Egypt) **Marwan El Shorbagy** | 5 | 490 | 1100 | 675 | DNP | **2750** | 250 | 5265 |
| 6 | (Egypt) **Mohamed El Shorbagy** | 4 | **1225** | DNP | 410 | DNP | 675 | **2750** | 5060 |
| 7 | (Wales) **Joel Makin** | 6 | 300 | 250 | 675 | 430 | 1100 | 675 | 3430 |
| 8 | (Egypt) **Mostafa Asal** | 4 | DNP | 1100 | DNP | 700 | 410 | 675 | 2885 |
| 9 | (France) **Grégoire Marche** | 6 | 182.5 | 410 | 410 | 260 | 410 | 675 | 2347.5 |
| 10 | (Egypt) Karim Abdel Gawad | 5 | 805 | 250 | DNP | 260 | 250 | 675 | 2240 |
| 11 | (Egypt) Youssef Ibrahim | 5 | DNP | 410 | 675 | 160 | 410 | 410 | 2065 |
| 12 | (France) Grégory Gaultier | 5 | DNP | 675 | 250 | 260 | 410 | 250 | 1845 |
| 13 | (Peru) Diego Elías | 3 | DNP | 675 | 675 | 430 | DNP | DNP | 1780 |
| 14 | (Egypt) Mazen Hesham | 4 | DNP | 675 | DNP | 260 | 410 | 410 | 1755 |
| 15 | (Colombia) Miguel Ángel Rodríguez | 5 | DNP | 410 | 410 | 430 | 250 | 250 | 1750 |
| 16 | (Egypt) Mohamed Abouelghar | 5 | 182.5 | DNP | 250 | 430 | 250 | 410 | 1522.5 |

Bold – Players qualified for the final
(*) – Winners of Platinum's tournaments automatically qualifies for Finals.
(‡) – Fares Dessouky did not play World Tour Finals due to a back injury.

| Final tournament | Country | Location | Prize money | Date | 2020–21 World Tour Champion |
|---|---|---|---|---|---|
| PSA World Tour Finals 2021 | Egypt | Cairo | $185,000 | 22–27 June 2021 | (Egypt) Mostafa Asal |

== Women's ==
=== Tournaments ===
| Tournament | Country | Location | Rank | Prize money | Date | Winner |
|---|---|---|---|---|---|---|
| Manchester Open | England | Manchester | Silver | $85,000 | 16–22 September 2020 | (Egypt) Nour El Tayeb |
| CIB Egyptian Squash Open | Egypt | Cairo | Platinum | $270,000 | 10–17 October 2020 | (Egypt) Nour El Sherbini |
| CIB Black Ball Squash Open | Egypt | New Cairo | Gold | $112,500 | 7–12 December 2020 | (England) Sarah-Jane Perry |
| CIB Black Ball Squash Open | Egypt | New Cairo | Platinum | $175,000 | 12–18 March 2021 | (Egypt) Nour El Sherbini |
| El Gouna International | Egypt | El Gouna | Platinum | $181,500 | 20–28 May 2021 | (Egypt) Nour El Sherbini |

=== Standings ===
World Championship
| 177.5 | 1st Round | 290 | 2nd Round |
| 475 | 3rd Round | 780 | Quarterfinalist |
| 1270 | Semifinalist | 2090 | Runner-up |
| **3175** | Winner | | |

Platinum
| 152.5 | 1st Round | 250 | 2nd Round |
| 410 | 3rd Round | 675 | Quarterfinalist |
| 1100 | Semifinalist | 1810 | Runner-up |
| **2750** | Winner | | |

Gold
| 160 | 1st Round | 260 | 2nd Round |
| 430 | Quarterfinalist | 700 | Semifinalist |
| 1150 | Runner-up | **1750** | Winner |

Silver
| 112.5 | 1st Round | 182.5 | 2nd Round |
| 300 | Quarterfinalist | 490 | Semifinalist |
| 805 | Runner-up | **1225** | Winner |

Bronze
| 80 | 1st Round | 130 | 2nd Round |
| 215 | Quarterfinalist | 350 | Semifinalist |
| 575 | Runner-up | **875** | Winner |

Top 16 Women's World Tour Standings 2020–21
| Rank | Player | Tournaments Played | ENG (England) | EGY (Egypt) | EGY (Egypt) | EGY (Egypt) | EGY (Egypt) | Total Points |
|---|---|---|---|---|---|---|---|---|
| 1 | (Egypt) **Nour El Sherbini** | 4 | DNP | **2750** | 430 | **2750** | **2750** | 8680 |
| 2 | (Egypt) **Hania El Hammamy** | 5 | 490 | 1100 | 1150 | 675 | 1100 | 4515 |
| 3 | (Egypt) **Nouran Gohar** | 4 | DNP | 1810 | 430 | 410 | 1810 | 4460 |
| 4 | (United States) **Amanda Sobhy** | 5 | 300 | 250 | 700 | 1810 | 1100 | 4160 |
| 5 | (England) **Sarah-Jane Perry** | 5 | 490 | 250 | **1750** | 675 | 675 | 3840 |
| 6 | (France) **Camille Serme** | 5 | 805 | 675 | 430 | 675 | 675 | 3260 |
| 7 | (New Zealand) **Joelle King** | 5 | 300 | 410 | 700 | 1100 | 410 | 2920 |
| 8 | (Egypt) **Salma Hany** | 5 | 300 | 675 | 160 | 1100 | 675 | 2910 |
| 9 | (Egypt) Nour El Tayeb | 2 | **1225** | 1100 | DNP | DNP | DNP | 2325 |
| 10 | (Canada) Hollie Naughton | 5 | 182.5 | 410 | 260 | 410 | 410 | 1672.5 |
| 11 | (Egypt) Rowan Elaraby | 4 | DNP | 410 | 160 | 410 | 675 | 1655 |
| 12 | (Belgium) Nele Gilis | 5 | 182.5 | 675 | 260 | 250 | 250 | 1617.5 |
| 13 | (India) Joshna Chinappa | 4 | DNP | 675 | 260 | 410 | 250 | 1595 |
| 14 | (Belgium) Tinne Gilis | 5 | 182.5 | 410 | 260 | 410 | 250 | 1512.5 |
| 15 | (United States) Olivia Clyne | 4 | DNP | 250 | 260 | 675 | 250 | 1435 |
| 16 | (Egypt) Nadine Shahin | 5 | 182.5 | 410 | 260 | 410 | 152.5 | 1415 |

Bold – Players qualified for the final
(*) – Winners of Platinum's tournaments automatically qualifies for Finals.

| Final tournament | Country | Location | Prize money | Date | 2020–21 World Tour Champion |
|---|---|---|---|---|---|
| PSA World Tour Finals 2021 | Egypt | Cairo | $185,000 | 22–27 June 2021 | (Egypt) Nouran Gohar |

== See also ==
- 2020–21 PSA World Tour
- Official Men's Squash World Ranking
- Official Women's Squash World Ranking
