= PSA World Series =

Series of men's and women's squash tournament

Details
- Event name: PSA World Series
- Dates: 1992–2018

The PSA World Series (formerly known as the PSA Super Series) was a series of men's and women's squash tournaments which were part of the Professional Squash Association (PSA) World Tour for the squash season. The tournaments were some of the most prestigious events on the men's tour. The best-performing players in the World Series events qualified for the annual PSA World Series Finals tournament.

Each year, several tournaments on the tour were designated World Series events. These included major events such as the World Championship, the British Open, the Hong Kong Open or the Tournament of Champions. Then, early the next year, the eight best-performing players from the Super Series events were invited to compete in the PSA World Series Finals (a similar event to the ATP World Tour Finals).

The World Series Squash Finals were first staged in Vitis Club in Zurich, Switzerland, in 1993 and 1994. The event was then moved to England and held at the Galleria shopping complex in Hatfield from 1996 to 1998. From 1999 to 2006, it was held in the Broadgate Arena in London. In 2007, the event was moved to the National Squash Centre in Manchester. In 2009, the tournament was shortened to a four-day format and played at the Queen's Club in London.

From January 2015, it also included World Series tournaments for women after a merger between PSA and WSA in November 2014.

After 2017–18, the PSA World Series was replaced by the PSA World Tour and PSA World Tour finals.

== Tournaments ==
Here is the list of tournaments that have been at least a season PSA World Series tournament since 1993 :

Tournament	Country	Location (the last)	Notable venue	Began	Sex
World Championship	/	/	/	1976	M/F
British Open	(United Kingdom) Great Britain	Hull	Airco Arena	1930	M/F
Tournament of Champions	United States	New York City	Grand Central Terminal	1930	M/F
US Open	United States	Philadelphia	Daskalakis Athletic Center	1954	M/F
Hong Kong Open	Hong Kong	Hong Kong	Tsim Sha Tsui	1985	M/F
Qatar Classic	Qatar	Doha	Aspire Academy Squash Complex	1992	M
Windy City Open	United States	Chicago	University Club of Chicago	2001	M/F
El Gouna International	Egypt	El Gouna	Abu Tig Marina	2010	M/F
Saudi PSA Masters	Saudi Arabia	Riyadh	PNU Sports Complex	2017	F
North American Open	United States	Richmond, Virginia	Westwood Club	1966	M
Australian Open	Australia	Canberra	National Convention Centre	1980	M/F
Brazil Open	Brazil	Rio	/	1993	M
JSM Super Squash	Japan	Yokohama	/	1994	M
Mahindra International	India	Bombay	/	1994	M
Al-Ahram International	Egypt	Cairo	Giza Plateau (in front of the pyramids)	1996	M/F
Pakistan International	Pakistan	Islamabad	/	1999	M
PSA Masters	(Egypt) / (Qatar) / (Bermuda) / (India)	New Delhi	/	2000	M
Kuwait PSA Cup	Kuwait	Kuwait City	/	2004	M
Saudi International	Saudi Arabia	Al Khobar	/	2005	M
Sky Open	Egypt	Cairo	/	2008	M
British Grand Prix	England	Manchester	National Squash Centre	2010	M

== PSA World Series ranking points ==
PSA World Series events also had a separate World Series ranking. Points for this were calculated on a cumulative basis after each World Series event. The top eight players at the end of the calendar year were then eligible to play in the PSA World Series Finals.

Tournament			World Series ranking points
Rank	Prize money US$	Ranking points	Winner	Runner up	3/4	5/8	9/16	17/32
World Series	150,000 +	625 points	100	65	40	25	15	10

At the same time, the players competing in PSA World Series events earned world ranking points according to the prize money, the classification of the event and the final position in the draw the player reached.

Tournament classification			World ranking points
Rank	Prize money US$	Ranking points	Winner	Runner up	3/4	5/8	9/16	17/32	33/64	Last Rnd Q.
PSA World Championship	$325,000 +	21,660	2,890	1,900	1,155	700	410	205	125	75
PSA World Series	$150,000– $324,999	15,970	2,625	1,725	1,050	640	375	190	-	115
PSA Cup	$170,000– $324,999	16,300	2,200	1,500	900	640	390	200	120	-

== World Series Finals ==
=== Men's ===
Year	Location	Champion	Runner-up	Score in final
1993	(Switzerland) Zurich	(Pakistan) Jansher Khan	(Australia) Chris Dittmar	15–10, 10–15, 15–13, 15–8
1994	(Switzerland) Zurich	(Pakistan) Jansher Khan	(England) Peter Marshall	8–15, 15–8, 15–7, 15–9
1995	No competition			
1996	(United Kingdom) Hatfield	(England) Del Harris	(Australia) Brett Martin	10–8, 7–9, 9–4, 6–9, 9–2
1997	(United Kingdom) Hatfield	(Pakistan) Jansher Khan	(Australia) Brett Martin	9–7, 9–5, 9–2
1998	(United Kingdom) Hatfield	(Pakistan) Jansher Khan	(England) Simon Parke	15–12, 13–15, 15–11, 15–10
1999	(United Kingdom) London	(Scotland) Peter Nicol	(Egypt) Ahmed Barada	15–8, 9–15, 15–9, 15–11
2000	(United Kingdom) London	(Scotland) Peter Nicol	(England) Simon Parke	13–15, 15–9, 15–12, 12–15, 15–12
2001	(United Kingdom) London	(Scotland) Peter Nicol	(Australia) David Palmer	15–7, 15–11, 13–15, 17–14
2002	(United Kingdom) London	(Australia) David Palmer	(France) Thierry Lincou	15–9, 10–15, 15–7, 10–15, 15–4
2003	(United Kingdom) London	(Canada) Jonathon Power	(England) Peter Nicol	15–11, 10–15, 13–15, 15–4, 15–14
2004	(United Kingdom) London	(France) Thierry Lincou	(Australia) Joe Kneipp	10–11 ^{(0–2)}, 11–9, 11–2, 11–1
2005	(United Kingdom) London	(Canada) Jonathon Power	(France) Thierry Lincou	11–7, 11–6, 11–2
2006	(United Kingdom) London	(Australia) Anthony Ricketts	(England) Lee Beachill	11–7, 6–11, 11–4, 11–10 ^{(2-0)}
2007	(United Kingdom) Manchester	(Egypt) Ramy Ashour	(France) Grégory Gaultier	11–10 ^{(2–0)}, 11–8, 4–11, 11–4
2008	(United Kingdom) London	(France) Grégory Gaultier	(Egypt) Amr Shabana	11–9, 11–8, 11–8
2009	(United Kingdom) London	(France) Grégory Gaultier	(France) Thierry Lincou	11–6, 8–11, 11–5, 11–5
2010	(United Kingdom) London	(England) Nick Matthew / (Egypt) Amr Shabana		Not played
2011	(United Kingdom) London	(Egypt) Amr Shabana	(France) Grégory Gaultier	6–11, 12–10, 11–7, 7–11, 11–8
2012	(United Kingdom) London	(Egypt) Amr Shabana	(England) Nick Matthew	4–11, 11–2, 11–4, 11–7
2013	(United States) Richmond	(Egypt) Ramy Ashour	(Egypt) Mohamed El Shorbagy	15–17, 11–7, 11–4, 11–5
2014	World Series Finals were not held			
2015	World Series Finals were not held			
2016	(United Arab Emirates) Dubai	(France) Grégory Gaultier	(Australia) Cameron Pilley	11–4, 11–5, 8–11, 11–6
2017	(United Arab Emirates) Dubai	(Egypt) Mohamed El Shorbagy	(England) James Willstrop	12–10, 11–9, 11–8
2018	(United Arab Emirates) Dubai	(Egypt) Mohamed El Shorbagy	(Egypt) Ali Farag	9–11, 11–3, 11–9, 11–8

=== Women's ===
Year	Location	Champion	Runner-up	Score in final
2011	(United Kingdom) London	(Malaysia) Nicol David	(Republic of Ireland) Madeline Perry	11–9, 11–9, 11–9
2012	(United Kingdom) London	(Malaysia) Nicol David	(England) Laura Massaro	11–3, 11–2, 11–9
2013	World Series Finals were not held			
2014	World Series Finals were not held			
2015	World Series Finals were not held			
2016	(United Arab Emirates) Dubai	(England) Laura Massaro	(Egypt) Raneem El Weleily	9–11, 11–6, 5–11, 12–10, 11–5
2017	(United Arab Emirates) Dubai	(England) Laura Massaro	(Egypt) Nour El Sherbini	11–8, 12–10, 11–5
2018	(United Arab Emirates) Dubai	(Egypt) Nour El Sherbini	(Egypt) Raneem El Weleily	3–11, 8–11, 11–7, 11–4, 11–6

== See also ==
- Professional Squash Association
- WSA World Series
- Official Men's Squash World Ranking
- Official Women's Squash World Ranking
