= 2019–20 PSA World Tour Finals =

2019–20 PSA World Tour

Details
- Event name: 2019–20 PSA World Tour Finals
- Location: Cairo
- Venue: Mall of Arabia
- Website; PSA World Tour standings
- Year: 2019–20 PSA World Tour

The 2019–20 PSA World Tour is a series of men's and women's squash tournaments which are part of the Professional Squash Association (PSA) PSA World Tour from August 2019 until July 2020. The PSA World Tour tournaments are some of the most prestigious events on the men's and women's tour. The best-performing players in the World Tour events qualify for the annual Men's and Women's Finals.

Starting in August 2018, PSA replaced World Series tournaments with new PSA World Tour, comprising four new tournament-tiers: Platinum ($164,500–$180,500), Gold ($100,000–$120,500), Silver ($70,000–$88,000) and Bronze ($51,000–$53,000) each one awarding different points.

== PSA World Tour Ranking Points ==
PSA World Tour events also have a separate World Tour ranking. Points for this are calculated on a cumulative basis after each World Tour event. The top eight players at the end of the calendar year are then eligible to play in the PSA World Tour Finals.

Ranking points vary according to tournament tier being awarded as follows:

Tournament			Ranking Points
Rank	Prize Money US$	Ranking Points	Winner	Runner up	3/4	5/8	9/16	17/32	33/48
World Championship	$500,000	25045 points	3175	2090	1270	780	475	290	177.5
Platinum	$164,500–$180,500	19188 points	2750	1810	1100	675	410	250	152.5
Gold	$100,000–$120,500	10660 points	1750	1150	700	430	260	160
Silver	$75,000–$88,000	7470 points	1225	805	490	300	182.5	112.5
Bronze	$47,500–$55,000	5330 points	875	575	350	215	130	80

== Men's ==
=== Tournaments ===
Tournament	Country	Location	Rank	Prize money	Date	Winner
J.P. Morgan China Squash Open	China	Shanghai	Gold	$112,000	4–8 September 2019	(Egypt) Mohamed El Shorbagy
Open de France – Nantes	France	Nantes	Silver	$73,500	9–14 September 2019	(New Zealand) Paul Coll
Oracle Netsuite Open	United States	San Francisco	Gold	$121,000	24–30 September 2019	(Egypt) Mohamed El Shorbagy
FS Investments U.S. Open	United States	Philadelphia	Platinum	$185,500	5–12 October 2019	(Egypt) Ali Farag
CIB Egyptian Squash Open	Egypt	Cairo	Platinum	$185,000	25 Oct.–1 Nov. 2019	(Egypt) Karim Abdel Gawad
PSA World Championships	Qatar	Doha	W.C.	$335,000	8–15 November 2019	(Egypt) Tarek Momen
Channel VAS Championships	England	Weybridge	Gold	$106,000	19–24 November 2019	(Egypt) Karim Abdel Gawad
J.P. Morgan Tournament of Champions	United States	New York City	Platinum	$195,000	9–17 January 2020	(Egypt) Mohamed El Shorbagy
Pittsburgh Open	United States	Pittsburgh	Bronze	$52,500	22–26 January 2020	(Egypt) Fares Dessouky
Motor City Open	United States	Bloomfield Hills	Silver	$76,000	5–9 February 2020	(Peru) Diego Elías
Troilus Gold Canada Cup	Canada	Toronto	Silver	$79,500	21–25 February 2020	(Egypt) Tarek Momen
The Windy City Open	United States	Chicago	Platinum	$250,000	27 Feb.–4 Mar. 2020	(Egypt) Ali Farag
Canary Wharf Classic	England	London	Gold	$109,500	8–13 March 2020	(Egypt) Mohamed El Shorbagy

=== Standings ===
World Championship
177.5	1st Round	290	2nd Round
475	3rd Round	780	Quarterfinalist
1270	Semifinalist	2090	Runner-up
**3175**	Winner		

Platinum
152.5	1st Round	250	2nd Round
410	3rd Round	675	Quarterfinalist
1100	Semifinalist	1810	Runner-up
**2750**	Winner		

Gold
160	1st Round	260	2nd Round
430	Quarterfinalist	700	Semifinalist
1150	Runner-up	**1750**	Winner

Silver
112.5	1st Round	182.5	2nd Round
300	Quarterfinalist	490	Semifinalist
805	Runner-up	**1225**	Winner

Bronze
80	1st Round	130	2nd Round
215	Quarterfinalist	350	Semifinalist
575	Runner-up	**875**	Winner

Top 16 Men's PSA World Tour Standings 2019–20
Rank	Player	Tournaments Played	CHN (China)	FRA (France)	USA (United States)	USA (United States)	EGY (Egypt)	QAT (Qatar)	ENG (England)	USA (United States)	USA (United States)	USA (United States)	CAN (Canada)	USA (United States)	ENG (England)	Total Points
1	(Egypt) Mohamed El Shorbagy‡	8	**1750**	–	**1750**	1810	–	780	1150	**2750**	–	–	–	675	**1750**	12415
2	(Egypt) **Ali Farag**	6	1150	–	–	**2750**	1810	–	–	1100	–	–	–	**2750**	1150	10710
3	(Egypt) **Tarek Momen**	8	–	–	1150	1100	250	**3175**	–	1810	–	–	**1225**	1100	700	10510
4	(New Zealand) **Paul Coll**	8	–	**1225**	–	675	1100	2090	700	675	–	–	805	1810	–	9080
5	(Egypt) **Karim Abdel Gawad**	7	–	–	–	675	**2750**	475	**1750**	1100	–	–	–	1100	260	8110
6	(Egypt) **Marwan El Shorbagy**	10	700	–	700	250	675	1270	430	250	–	300	–	250	700	5525
7	(Peru) **Diego Elías**	9	–	–	–	1100	250	780	260	250	–	**1225**	490	675	430	5460
8	(Wales) **Joel Makin**	10	–	805	430	410	1100	475	430	675	–	–	300	410	160	5195
9	(Germany) **Simon Rösner**	8	–	300	260	675	250	1270	–	675	–	–	–	675	260	4365
10	(India) Saurav Ghosal	9	700	–	–	250	410	475	430	410	575	–	–	250	430	3930
11	(Egypt) Fares Dessouky	7	–	300	–	250	675	475	–	–	**875**	–	–	250	430	3255
12	(Egypt) Mazen Hesham	9	430	–	–	410	410	290	430	250	–	–	300	410	160	3090
13	(France) Grégoire Marche	9	–	490	–	410	410	177.5	–	410	350	182.5	–	250	160	2840
14	(France) Mathieu Castagnet	9	–	300	260	250	–	290	260	250	–	–	490	410	260	2770
15	(Egypt) Zahed Salem	8	–	490	–	410	250	780	–	250	130	182.5	–	250	–	2742.5
16	(Egypt) Omar Mosaad	8	430	–	–	250	250	475	–	250	350	–	–	410	260	2675

Bold – Players qualified for the Finals
(*) – Winners of Platinum's tournaments automatically qualifies for Finals.
(‡) – Mohamed ElShorbay opts out to not play for personal reasons.

Final tournament	Country	Location	Prize money	Date	2019–20 World Tour Champion
PSA World Tour Finals 2020	Egypt	Cairo	$185,000	28 Sep.–3 Oct.	(Egypt) Marwan El Shorbagy

== Women's ==
=== Tournaments ===
Tournament	Country	Location	Rank	Prize money	Date	Winner
J.P. Morgan China Squash Open	China	Shanghai	Gold	$112,000	4–8 September 2019	(Egypt) Nour El Tayeb
Open de France – Nantes	France	Nantes	Silver	$73,500	9–14 September 2019	(France) Camille Serme
Oracle Netsuite Open	United States	San Francisco	Gold	$121,000	24–30 September 2019	(Egypt) Raneem El Weleily
FS Investments U.S. Open	United States	Philadelphia	Platinum	$169,000	5–12 October 2019	(Egypt) Nouran Gohar
PSA World Championships	Egypt	Cairo	W.C.	$430,000	24 Oct.–1 Nov. 2019	(Egypt) Nour El Sherbini
J.P. Morgan Tournament of Champions	United States	New York City	Platinum	$195,000	9–17 January 2020	(France) Camille Serme
Carol Weymuller Open	United States	New York City	Bronze	$51,250	22–27 January 2020	(Egypt) Nouran Gohar
Cleveland Classic	United States	Cleveland	Bronze	$51,250	30 Jan.–3 Feb. 2020	(Egypt) Nour El Tayeb
Bahl & Gaynor Cincinnati Cup	United States	Cincinnati	Bronze	$51,250	20–24 February 2020	(United States) Amanda Sobhy
The Windy City Open	United States	Chicago	Platinum	$250,000	27 Feb.–4 Mar. 2020	(Egypt) Nour El Sherbini
CIB Black Ball Squash Open	Egypt	New Cairo	Platinum	$180,500	8–14 March 2020	(Egypt) Hania El Hammamy

=== Standings ===
World Championship
177.5	1st Round	290	2nd Round
475	3rd Round	780	Quarterfinalist
1270	Semifinalist	2090	Runner-up
**3175**	Winner		

Platinum
152.5	1st Round	250	2nd Round
410	3rd Round	675	Quarterfinalist
1100	Semifinalist	1810	Runner-up
**2750**	Winner		

Gold
160	1st Round	260	2nd Round
430	Quarterfinalist	700	Semifinalist
1150	Runner-up	**1750**	Winner

Silver
112.5	1st Round	182.5	2nd Round
300	Quarterfinalist	490	Semifinalist
805	Runner-up	**1225**	Winner

Bronze
80	1st Round	130	2nd Round
215	Quarterfinalist	350	Semifinalist
575	Runner-up	**875**	Winner

Top 16 Women's World Tour Standings 2019–20
Rank	Player	Tournaments Played	CHN (China)	FRA (France)	USA (United States)	USA (United States)	EGY (Egypt)	USA (United States)	USA (United States)	USA (United States)	USA (United States)	USA (United States)	EGY (Egypt)	Total Points
1	(Egypt) **Nour El Sherbini**	4	–	–	–	–	**3175**	1810	–	–	–	**2750**	1810	9545
2	(Egypt) Raneem El Weleily‡	7	1150	–	**1750**	1100	2090	675	–	–	–	1810	675	9250
3	(Egypt) **Nour El Tayeb**	9	**1750**	–	1150	1810	780	410	575	**875**	–	250	1100	8700
4	(Egypt) **Nouran Gohar**	7	700	–	–	**2750**	1270	1100	**875**	–	–	1100	410	8205
5	(France) **Camille Serme**	8	–	**1225**	700	1100	780	**2750**	350	–	–	675	410	7990
6	(Egypt) **Hania El Hammamy**	8	700	490	–	410	1270	410	–	–	350	410	**2750**	6790
7	(England) **Sarah-Jane Perry**	9	–	490	430	675	780	675	–	575	575	1100	1100	6400
8	(United States) **Amanda Sobhy**	9	–	805	430	675	177.5	250	130	–	**875**	675	675	4692.5
9	(New Zealand) **Joelle King**	9	430	–	430	410	780	1100	350	350	–	250	250	4350
10	(Egypt) Salma Hany	9	430	–	260	410	475	675	215	130	–	410	250	3255
11	(United States) Olivia Blatchford Clyne	9	–	300	260	250	290	410	–	215	350	675	410	3160
12	(India) Joshna Chinappa	8	–	–	700	410	475	410	130	350	–	250	250	2975
13	(Egypt) Yathreb Adel	7	430	–	–	410	475	410	130	–	–	410	410	2675
14	(Egypt) Rowan Elaraby	6	–	–	–	675	290	250	–	–	215	675	410	2515
15	(Egypt) Nadine Shahin	8	430	182.5	–	250	290	250	–	130	–	410	410	2352.5
16	(Belgium) Nele Gilis	9	–	182.5	260	250	290	250	80	–	215	410	410	2347.5

Bold – Players qualified for the Finals
(*) – Winners of Platinum's tournaments automatically qualifies for Finals.
(‡) – Announced retirement from squash on 25 June 2020.

Final tournament	Country	Location	Prize money	Date	2019–20 World Tour Champion
PSA World Tour Finals 2020	Egypt	Cairo	$185,000	28 Sep.–3 Oct.	(Egypt) Hania El Hammamy

== See also ==
- 2019–20 PSA World Tour
- Official Men's Squash World Ranking
- Official Women's Squash World Ranking
