= 2021 Men's PSA World Tour Finals =

PSA World Tour Finals
- 3rd Men's PSA World Tour Finals
- Location: Cairo, Egypt
- Venue: Mall of Arabia
- Date: 22–27 June 2021
- Website; Official website
- Prize money: $185,000

Results
- Champion: Mostafa Asal (EGY)
- Runner-up: Mohamed El Shorbagy (EGY)
- Semi-finalists: Tarek Momen (EGY); Paul Coll (NZL)

The 2021 CIB Men's PSA World Tour Finals will be the men's third edition of the PSA World Tour Finals (Prize money : $185,000). The top 8 players in the 2020–21 PSA World Tour are qualified for the event. As previous year, the event took place at Mall of Arabia, Cairo in Egypt from 22 to 27 June 2021.

It's the third edition under the PSA World Tour Finals label after the PSA renamed PSA World Series to current PSA World Tour Finals. CIB remains as the title sponsor.

20 years old Mostafa Asal, in his first appearance in a PSA World Tour Finals won the event defeating two-time winner and World Ranking Nº2 Mohamed El Shorbagy 12–14, 11–4, 11–7, 11–3.

== PSA World Ranking Points ==
PSA also awards points towards World Ranking. Points are awarded as follows:

PSA World Tour Finals		Ranking Points				
Rank	Prize money US$	Winner	Runner up	3/4	Round-Robin Match Win	Undefeated bonus
World Tour Finals	$185,000	1000	550	200	150	150

=== Match points distribution ===
Points towards the standings are awarded when the following scores:

Match score	Points
2–0 win	4 points
2–1 win	3 points
1–2 loss	1 point
0–2 loss	0 points

== Qualification & Seeds ==
=== Qualification ===
Top eight players at 2020–21 PSA World Tour standings qualifies to Finals.

World Championship
177.5	1st Round	290	2nd Round
475	3rd Round	780	Quarterfinalist
1270	Semifinalist	2090	Runner-up
**3175**	Winner		

Platinum
152.5	1st Round	250	2nd Round
410	3rd Round	675	Quarterfinalist
1100	Semifinalist	1810	Runner-up
**2750**	Winner		

Gold
160	1st Round	260	2nd Round
430	Quarterfinalist	700	Semifinalist
1150	Runner-up	**1750**	Winner

Silver
112.5	1st Round	182.5	2nd Round
300	Quarterfinalist	490	Semifinalist
805	Runner-up	**1225**	Winner

Bronze
80	1st Round	130	2nd Round
215	Quarterfinalist	350	Semifinalist
575	Runner-up	**875**	Winner

Top 16 Men's PSA World Tour Standings 2020–21
Rank	Player	Tournaments Played	ENG (England)	EGY (Egypt)	QAT (Qatar)	EGY (Egypt)	EGY (Egypt)	EGY (Egypt)	Total Points
1	(Egypt) **Ali Farag**	5	300	**2750**	**2750**	1150	675	DNP	7625
2	(Egypt) Fares Dessouky‡	6	182.5	250	1100	**1750**	1810	1100	6192.5
3	(Egypt) **Tarek Momen**	6	300	1810	1100	700	1100	1100	6110
4	(New Zealand) **Paul Coll**	6	490	675	1810	260	675	1810	5720
5	(Egypt) **Marwan El Shorbagy**	5	490	1100	675	DNP	**2750**	250	5265
6	(Egypt) **Mohamed El Shorbagy**	4	**1225**	DNP	410	DNP	675	**2750**	5060
7	(Wales) **Joel Makin**	6	300	250	675	430	1100	675	3430
8	(Egypt) **Mostafa Asal**	4	DNP	1100	DNP	700	410	675	2885
9	(France) **Grégoire Marche**	6	182.5	410	410	260	410	675	2347.5
10	(Egypt) Karim Abdel Gawad	5	805	250	DNP	260	250	675	2240
11	(Egypt) Youssef Ibrahim	5	DNP	410	675	160	410	410	2065
12	(France) Grégory Gaultier	5	DNP	675	250	260	410	250	1845
13	(Peru) Diego Elías	3	DNP	675	675	430	DNP	DNP	1780
14	(Egypt) Mazen Hesham	4	DNP	675	DNP	260	410	410	1755
15	(Colombia) Miguel Ángel Rodríguez	5	DNP	410	410	430	250	250	1750
16	(Egypt) Mohamed Abouelghar	5	182.5	DNP	250	430	250	410	1522.5

Bold – Players qualified for the final
(*) – Winners of Platinum's tournaments automatically qualifies for Finals.
(‡) – Fares Dessouky did not play World Tour Finals due to a back injury.

=== Seeds ===
1. (Egypt) Ali Farag
2. (Egypt) Tarek Momen
3. (New Zealand) Paul Coll
4. (Egypt) Marwan El Shorbagy
5. (Egypt) Mohamed El Shorbagy
6. (Wales) Joel Makin
7. (Egypt) Mostafa Asal
8. (France) Grégoire Marche

== Group stage results ==
Times are Eastern European Time (UTC+02:00). To the best of three games.

=== Group A ===
Date	Time	Player 1	Player 2	Score
22 June	19:30	Mohamed El Shorbagy (EGY)	Mostafa Asal (EGY)	11–8, 7–11, 11–8
22 June	20:45	Ali Farag (EGY)	Marwan El Shorbagy (EGY)	12–10, 4–11, 11–13
23 June	20:45	Mohamed El Shorbagy (EGY)	Ali Farag (EGY)	11–8, 8–11, 13–11
23 June	22:00	Marwan El Shorbagy (EGY)	Mostafa Asal (EGY)	11–13, 3–11
24 June	22:00	Mohamed El Shorbagy (EGY)	Marwan El Shorbagy (EGY)	11–8, 4–11, 4–11
25 June	19:30	Mostafa Asal (EGY)	Ali Farag (EGY)	11–4, 11–6

==== Standings ====
Pos	Team	Pld	W	L	GF	GA	GD	Pts	Qualification
1	Mostafa Asal (EGY)	3	2	1	5	2	+3	9	Advancing to Semifinals
2	Mohamed El Shorbagy (EGY)	3	2	1	5	4	+1	7	Advancing to Semifinals
3	Marwan El Shorbagy (EGY)	3	2	1	4	4	0	6	
4	Ali Farag (EGY)	3	0	3	2	6	−4	2	

Source: PSA World Tour Finals

=== Group B ===
Date	Time	Player 1	Player 2	Score
22 June	22:00	Paul Coll (NZL)	Tarek Momen (EGY)	12–10, 7–11, 11–4
23 June	19:30	Grégoire Marche (FRA)	Joel Makin (WAL)	8–11, 11–9, 11–3
24 June	19:30	Paul Coll (NZL)	Joel Makin (WAL)	6–11, 11–4, 12–10
24 June	20:45	Grégoire Marche (FRA)	Tarek Momen (EGY)	11–13, 13–11, 7–11
25 June	20:45	Paul Coll (NZL)	Grégoire Marche (FRA)	9–11, 11–1, 11–5
25 June	22:00	Tarek Momen (EGY)	Joel Makin (WAL)	14–12, 11–2

==== Standings ====
Pos	Team	Pld	W	L	GF	GA	GD	Pts	Qualification
1	Paul Coll (NZL)	3	3	0	6	3	+3	9	Advancing to Semifinals
2	Tarek Momen (EGY)	3	2	1	5	3	+2	8	Advancing to Semifinals
3	Grégoire Marche (FRA)	3	1	2	4	5	−1	5	
4	Joel Makin (WAL)	3	0	3	2	6	−4	2	

Source: PSA World Tour Finals

== Knockout stage ==
Semi finals (26 June)
7	Mostafa Asal (EGY)	11	6	11
2	Tarek Momen (EGY)	9	11	4
3	Paul Coll (NZL)	5	11	6
5	Mohamed El Shorbagy (EGY)	11	5	11

Final (27 June)
7	Mostafa Asal (EGY)	12	11	11	11
5	Mohamed El Shorbagy (EGY)	14	4	7	3

=== Semifinal ===
To the best of three games.

Date	Time	Player 1	Player 2	Score
26 June	19:30	Mostafa Asal (EGY)	Tarek Momen (EGY)	11–9, 6–11, 11–4
26 June	20:45	Paul Coll (NZL)	Mohamed El Shorbagy (EGY)	5–11, 11–5, 6–11

=== Final ===
To the best of five games.

Date	Time	Player 1	Player 2	Score
27 June	20:30	Mostafa Asal (EGY)	Mohamed El Shorbagy (EGY)	12–14, 11–4, 11–7, 11–3

2021 Men's PSA World Tour Finals winner
(Egypt)
Mostafa Asal
First title

== See also ==
- 2021 Women's PSA World Tour Finals
- 2020–21 PSA World Tour
