= Men's United States Open (squash) 2016 =

US Open 2016
- 29th Men's U.S. Open

Details
- Event name: Delaware Investments US Open 2016
- Location: (United States) Philadelphia, Pennsylvania
- Venue: Daskalakis Athletic Center
- Website www.usopensquash.com

Men's Winner
- Category: World Series
- Prize money: $150,000
- Year: World Tour 2016

The Men's United States Squash Open 2016 was the men's edition of the 2016 United States Open (squash), which is a PSA World Series event (prize money: $150,000). The event took place at the Daskalakis Athletic Center in Philadelphia, Pennsylvania in the United States from the 8th of October to the 15th October. Mohamed El Shorbagy won his second US Open trophy, beating Nick Matthew in the final.

== Prize money and ranking points ==
For 2016, the prize purse was $150,000. The on-site prize money and points breakdown was as follows:

Prize money US Open (2016)
Event	W	F	SF	QF	2R	1R
Points (PSA)	2625	1725	1050	640	375	190
Prize money	$23,625	$15,525	$9,450	$5,740	$3,375	$1,690

== Seeds ==
1. (Egypt) Mohamed El Shorbagy (champion)
2. (France) Grégory Gaultier (quarterfinals)
3. (Egypt) Omar Mosaad (first round)
4. (England) Nick Matthew (final)
5. (Egypt) Karim Abdel Gawad (semifinals)
6. (Egypt) Marwan El Shorbagy (quarterfinals)
7. (Colombia) Miguel Ángel Rodríguez (first round)
8. (France) Mathieu Castagnet (first round)

== Draw and results ==
First round
1	(Egypt) Mohd El Shorbagy	6	11	8	11	13
(Mexico) César Salazar	11	9	11	7	11
Q	(Egypt) Karim Ali Fathi	7	9	14	11
(England) Chris Simpson	11	11	12	13
(France) Grégoire Marche	11	3	7	6
Q	(Peru) Diego Elías	7	11	11	11
(Australia) Cameron Pilley	4	8	11	8
6	(Egypt) Marwan El Shorbagy	11	11	4	11
7	(Colombia) Miguel Ángel Rodríguez	9	8	9
Q	(Malaysia) Mohd Nafi. Adnan	11	11	11
Q	(Scotland) Alan Clyne	7	11	6	11	11
(South Africa) Stephen Coppinger	11	8	11	2	13
(Egypt) Mohd Abouelghar	11	11	11
Q	(New Zealand) Campbell Grayson	8	9	7
(England) James Willstrop	11	11	11
3	(Egypt) Omar Mosaad	8	8	8
4	(England) Nick Matthew	11	11	11
WC	(United States) Christopher Gordon	4	7	6
(Germany) Simon Rösner	11	7	11	11
Q	(Qatar) Abdulla Al Tamimi	8	11	5	5
(Hong Kong) Leo Au	5	7	11	11	10
(Egypt) Fares Dessouky	11	11	8	5	12
(Egypt) Ali Farag	11	11	11
8	(France) Mathieu Castagnet	8	6	7
5	(Egypt) Karim Abdel Gawad	11	11	11
(England) Tom Richards	8	9	7
Q	(Finland) Henrik Mustonen	4	5	1
(Hong Kong) Max Lee	11	11	11
(Australia) Ryan Cuskelly	11	7	6	4
Q	(New Zealand) Paul Coll	9	11	11	11
(England) Daryl Selby	8	6	3
2	(France) Grégory Gaultier	11	11	11

Second round
1	(Egypt) Mohd El Shorbagy	10	11	12	11
(England) Chris Simpson	12	9	10	5
Q	(Peru) Diego Elías	11	4	4	6
6	(Egypt) Marwan El Shorbagy	3	11	11	11
Q	(Malaysia) Mohd Nafi. Adnan	7	11	11	4	9
(South Africa) Stephen Coppinger	11	5	9	11	11
(Egypt) Mohamed Abouelghar	11	9	6	11	7
(England) James Willstrop	9	11	11	5	11
4	(England) Nick Matthew	11	6	9	11	11
(Germany) Simon Rösner	4	11	11	6	8
(Egypt) Fares Dessouky	7	11	3	rtd
(Egypt) Ali Farag	11	13	8
5	(Egypt) Karim Abdel Gawad	4	11	9	12	11
(Hong Kong) Max Lee	11	8	11	10	6
Q	(New Zealand) Paul Coll	7	7	6
2	(France) Grégory Gaultier	11	11	11

Quarter finals
1	(Egypt) Mohd El Shorbagy	11	11	12
6	(Egypt) Marwan El Shorbagy	7	5	10
(South Africa) Stephen Coppinger	9	11	8	3
(England) James Willstrop	11	5	11	11
4	(England) Nick Matthew	11	11	11
(Egypt) Ali Farag	8	7	8
5	(Egypt) Karim Abdel Gawad	3	11	11	11
2	(France) Grégory Gaultier	11	9	7	5

Semi finals
1	(Egypt) Mohd El Shorbagy	11	11	13
(England) James Willstrop	7	5	11
Final
1	(Egypt) Mohd El Shorbagy	10	12	11	11	3
4	(England) Nick Matthew	12	14	1	4	0
4	(England) Nick Matthew	11	7	16	3	12
2	(France) Grégory Gaultier	4	11	14	11	10

== See also ==
- United States Open (squash)
- 2016–17 PSA World Series
- Women's United States Open (squash) 2016

Preceded by Hong Kong Open; Hong Kong; 2016	PSA World Series 2016–17; United States Open; United States (Philadelphia); 2016	Succeeded by Qatar Classic; Qatar (Doha); 2016
