= 2021 Women's PSA World Tour Finals =

PSA World Tour Finals
- 3rd Women's PSA World Tour Finals
- Location: Cairo, Egypt
- Venue: Mall of Arabia
- Date: 22–27 June 2021
- Website; Official website
- Prize money: $185,000

Results
- Champion: Nouran Gohar (EGY)
- Runner-up: Hania El Hammamy (EGY)
- Semi-finalists: Camille Serme (FRA); Joelle King (NZL)

The 2021 CIB Women's PSA World Series Finals is the third women's edition of the PSA World Tour Finals (Prize money : $185,000) after the renaming of PSA World Series. The top 8 players in the 2020–21 PSA World Tour are qualified for the event. The event takes place at Mall of Arabia, Cairo in Egypt from 22 to 27 June 2021.

It's the third edition under the PSA World Tour Finals label after the PSA renamed PSA World Series to current PSA World Tour Finals. CIB remains as the title sponsor.

Nouran Gohar, in her first World Tour Finals Final appearance, became champion after defeating defending champion Hania El Hammamy 11–9, 11–6, 8–11, 11–8.

== PSA World Ranking Points ==
PSA also awards points towards World Ranking. Points are awarded as follows:

PSA World Tour Finals		Ranking Points				
Rank	Prize money US$	Winner	Runner up	3/4	Round-Robin Match Win	Undefeated bonus
World Tour Finals	$185,000	1000	550	200	150	150

=== Match points distribution ===
Points towards the standings are awarded when the following scores:

Match score	Points
2–0 win	4 points
2–1 win	3 points
1–2 loss	1 point
0–2 loss	0 point

== Qualification & Seeds ==
=== Qualification ===
Top eight players at 2020–21 PSA World Tour standings qualifies to Finals.

World Championship
177.5	1st Round	290	2nd Round
475	3rd Round	780	Quarterfinalist
1270	Semifinalist	2090	Runner-up
**3175**	Winner		

Platinum
152.5	1st Round	250	2nd Round
410	3rd Round	675	Quarterfinalist
1100	Semifinalist	1810	Runner-up
**2750**	Winner		

Gold
160	1st Round	260	2nd Round
430	Quarterfinalist	700	Semifinalist
1150	Runner-up	**1750**	Winner

Silver
112.5	1st Round	182.5	2nd Round
300	Quarterfinalist	490	Semifinalist
805	Runner-up	**1225**	Winner

Bronze
80	1st Round	130	2nd Round
215	Quarterfinalist	350	Semifinalist
575	Runner-up	**875**	Winner

Top 16 Women's World Tour Standings 2020–21
Rank	Player	Tournaments Played	ENG (England)	EGY (Egypt)	EGY (Egypt)	EGY (Egypt)	EGY (Egypt)	Total Points
1	(Egypt) **Nour El Sherbini**	4	DNP	**2750**	430	**2750**	**2750**	8680
2	(Egypt) **Hania El Hammamy**	5	490	1100	1150	675	1100	4515
3	(Egypt) **Nouran Gohar**	4	DNP	1810	430	410	1810	4460
4	(United States) **Amanda Sobhy**	5	300	250	700	1810	1100	4160
5	(England) **Sarah-Jane Perry**	5	490	250	**1750**	675	675	3840
6	(France) **Camille Serme**	5	805	675	430	675	675	3260
7	(New Zealand) **Joelle King**	5	300	410	700	1100	410	2920
8	(Egypt) **Salma Hany**	5	300	675	160	1100	675	2910
9	(Egypt) Nour El Tayeb	2	**1225**	1100	DNP	DNP	DNP	2325
10	(Canada) Hollie Naughton	5	182.5	410	260	410	410	1672.5
11	(Egypt) Rowan Elaraby	4	DNP	410	160	410	675	1655
12	(Belgium) Nele Gilis	5	182.5	675	260	250	250	1617.5
13	(India) Joshna Chinappa	4	DNP	675	260	410	250	1595
14	(Belgium) Tinne Gilis	5	182.5	410	260	410	250	1512.5
15	(United States) Olivia Clyne	4	DNP	250	260	675	250	1435
16	(Egypt) Nadine Shahin	5	182.5	410	260	410	152.5	1415

Bold – Players qualified for the final
(*) – Winners of Platinum's tournaments automatically qualifies for Finals.

=== Seeds ===
1. (Egypt) Nour El Sherbini
2. (Egypt) Hania El Hammamy
3. (Egypt) Nouran Gohar
4. (United States) Amanda Sobhy
5. (England) Sarah-Jane Perry
6. (France) Camille Serme
7. (New Zealand) Joelle King
8. (Egypt) Salma Hany

== Group stage results ==
Times are Eastern European Time (UTC+02:00). To the best of three games.

=== Group A ===
Date	Time	Player 1	Player 2	Score
22 June	19:00	Nouran Gohar (EGY)	Salma Hany (EGY)	9–11, 11–5, 11–2
22 June	20:15	Camille Serme (FRA)	Nour El Sherbini (EGY)	10–12, 11–3, 11–6
23 June	20:15	Salma Hany (EGY)	Nour El Sherbini (EGY)	8–11, 6–11
23 June	21:30	Camille Serme (FRA)	Nouran Gohar (EGY)	8–11, 12–14
24 June	20:15	Camille Serme (FRA)	Salma Hany (EGY)	11–4, 11–2
25 June	19:00	Nour El Sherbini (EGY)	Nouran Gohar (EGY)	12–10, 7–11, 8–11

==== Standings ====
Pos	Team	Pld	W	L	GF	GA	GD	Pts	Qualification
1	Nouran Gohar (EGY)	3	3	0	6	2	+4	10	Advancing to Semifinals
2	Camille Serme (FRA)	3	2	1	4	3	+1	7	Advancing to Semifinals
3	Nour El Sherbini (EGY)	3	1	2	4	4	0	6	
4	Salma Hany (EGY)	3	0	3	1	6	−5	1	

Source: PSA World Tour Finals

=== Group B ===
Date	Time	Player 1	Player 2	Score
22 June	21:30	Hania El Hammamy (EGY)	Sarah-Jane Perry (ENG)	11–7, 11–9
23 June	19:00	Joelle King (NZL)	Amanda Sobhy (USA)	11–5, 11–8
24 June	19:00	Hania El Hammamy (EGY)	Amanda Sobhy (USA)	11–9, 11–7
24 June	21:30	Sarah-Jane Perry (ENG)	Joelle King (NZL)	10–12, 7–11
25 June	20:15	Hania El Hammamy (EGY)	Joelle King (NZL)	12–10, 11–5
25 June	21:30	Amanda Sobhy (USA)	Sarah-Jane Perry (ENG)	8–11, 4–11

==== Standings ====
Pos	Team	Pld	W	L	GF	GA	GD	Pts	Qualification
1	Hania El Hammamy (EGY)	3	3	0	6	0	+6	12	Advancing to Semifinals
2	Joelle King (NZL)	3	2	1	4	2	+2	8	Advancing to Semifinals
3	Sarah-Jane Perry (ENG)	3	1	2	2	4	−2	4	
4	Amanda Sobhy (USA)	3	0	3	0	6	−6	0	

Source: PSA World Tour Finals

== Knockout stage ==
Semi finals (26 June)
3	Nouran Gohar (EGY)	11	10	11
7	Joelle King (NZL)	2	12	6
2	Hania El Hammamy (EGY)	11	3	14
6	Camille Serme (FRA)	6	11	12

Final (27 June)
3	Nouran Gohar (EGY)	11	11	8	11
2	Hania El Hammamy (EGY)	9	6	11	8

=== Semifinal ===
To the best of three games.

Date	Time	Player 1	Player 2	Score
26 June	19:00	Nouran Gohar (EGY)	Joelle King (NZL)	11–2, 10–12, 11–6
26 June	20:15	Hania El Hammamy (EGY)	Camille Serme (FRA)	11–6, 3–11, 14–12

=== Final ===
To the best of five games.

Date	Time	Player 1	Player 2	Score
27 June	19:30	Nouran Gohar (EGY)	Hania El Hammamy (EGY)	11–9, 11–6, 8–11, 11–8

2021 Women's PSA World Tour Finals winner
(Egypt)
Nouran Gohar
First title

== See also ==
- 2021 Men's PSA World Tour Finals
- 2020–21 PSA World Tour
- 2020–21 PSA World Tour Finals
