= 2017 Men's PSA World Series Finals =

PSA World Series Finals 2017
- 22nd PSA World Series Finals

Details
- Event name: PSA World Series Finals 2016–2017
- Location: Dubai, United Arab Emirates
- Venue: Dubai Opera
- Website worldseriesfinals.com

Men's Winner
- Category: PSA World Series Finals
- Prize money: $160,000
- Year: World Series 2016–2017

The 2017 Men's PSA World Series Finals is the men's edition of the 2016 PSA World Series Finals (Prize money : $160 000). The top 8 players in the 2016–17 PSA World Series are qualified for the event. The event will take place in Dubai in the United Arab Emirates from 6 to 10 June 2017.

== Seeds ==
1. (Egypt) Karim Abdel Gawad (semifinals)
2. (France) Grégory Gaultier (first round)
3. (Egypt) Mohamed El Shorbagy (champion)
4. (Egypt) Marwan El Shorbagy (first round)
5. (England) Nick Matthew (first round)
6. (England) James Willstrop (final)
7. (Germany) Simon Rösner (semifinals)
8. (Egypt) Ali Farag (first round)

== Group stage results ==
=== Pool A ===
(Egypt) Marwan El Shorbagy	11	11	11	-	13	8	7	(England) Nick Matthew
(Egypt) Karim Abdel Gawad	9	11	7	-	11	8	11	(Germany) Simon Rösner

(Egypt) Karim Abdel Gawad	11	11		-	7	6		(England) Nick Matthew
(Egypt) Marwan El Shorbagy	11	4	11	-	8	11	6	(Germany) Simon Rösner

(England) Nick Matthew	11	8	-	13	11	(Germany) Simon Rösner
(Egypt) Karim Abdel Gawad	11	12	-	7	10	(Egypt) Marwan El Shorbagy

Rank	Player	Match	Win	Lost	Games
1	(Egypt) Karim Abdel Gawad	3	2	1	5
2	(Germany) Simon Rösner	3	2	1	5
3	(Egypt) Marwan El Shorbagy	3	2	1	4
4	(England) Nick Matthew	3	0	3	1

=== Pool B ===
(Egypt) Mohamed El Shorbagy	11	11	-	8	9	(England) James Willstrop
(France) Grégory Gaultier	5	7	-	11	11	(Egypt) Ali Farag

(France) Grégory Gaultier	9	4		-	11	11		(England) James Willstrop
(Egypt) Mohamed El Shorbagy	8	11	12	-	11	8	10	(Egypt) Ali Farag

(England) James Willstrop	4	11	11	-	11	9	6	(Egypt) Ali Farag
(France) Grégory Gaultier	10	7		-	12	11		(Egypt) Mohamed El Shorbagy

Rank	Player	Match	Win	Lost	Games
1	(Egypt) Mohamed El Shorbagy	3	3	0	6
2	(England) James Willstrop	3	2	1	4
3	(Egypt) Ali Farag	3	1	2	4
4	(France) Grégory Gaultier	3	0	3	0

== Draw and results ==
Semi finals
1	(Egypt) Karim Abdel Gawad	12	6
6	(England) James Willstrop	14	11
7	(Germany) Simon Rösner	11	8	12
3	(Egypt) Mohamed El Shorbagy	9	11	14

Final
6	(England) James Willstrop	10	9	8
3	(Egypt) Mohamed El Shorbagy	12	11	11

== See also ==
- 2017 Men's PSA World Series Finals
- 2016–17 PSA World Series
- PSA World Series Finals
- PSA World Tour 2016
- 2017 PSA World Tour
