= Women's Hong Kong squash Open 2016 =

Cathay Pacific Hong Kong Open 2016
- 15th Women's Hong Kong Open

Details
- Event name: Cathay Pacific Sun Hung Kai Financial Hong Kong Open 2016
- Location: Hong Kong
- Venue: Hong Kong Squash Centre
- Website http://www.hksquashopen.com/

Women's Winner
- Category: World Series
- Prize money: $115,000
- Year: World Tour 2016

The Women's Cathay Pacific Hong Kong Open 2016 is the women's edition of the 2016 Hong Kong Open, which is a PSA World Series event (prize money: 115 000 $). The event took place in Hong Kong from 23 August to 28 August. Nouran Gohar won her first Hong Kong Open trophy, beating Amanda Sobhy in the final.

== Prize money and ranking points ==
For 2016, the prize purse was $115,000. The prize money and points breakdown is as follows:

Prize money Hong Kong Open (2016)
Event	W	F	SF	QF	2R	1R
Points (PSA)	2625	1725	1050	640	375	190
Prize money	$17,000	$10,400	$6,400	$3,800	$2,250	$1,325

== Seeds ==
1. (Egypt) Nour El Sherbini (semifinals)
2. (England) Laura Massaro (quarterfinals)
3. (Egypt) Raneem El Weleily (second round)
4. (Malaysia) Nicol David (semifinals)
5. (Egypt) Nouran Gohar (champion)
6. (France) Camille Serme (quarterfinals)
7. (United States) Amanda Sobhy (final)
8. (Egypt) Omneya Abdel Kawy (quarterfinals)
9. (New Zealand) Joelle King (second round)
10. (India) Joshna Chinappa (second round)
11. (Hong Kong) Annie Au (second round)
12. (England) Sarah-Jane Perry (second round)
13. (England) Alison Waters (second round)
14. (England) Jenny Duncalf (first round)
15. (England) Emily Whitlock (second round)
16. (Egypt) Nour El Tayeb (quarterfinals)

== Draw and results ==
First round
1	(Egypt) Nour El Sherbini	11	11	11
(Egypt) Heba El Torky	8	4	8
Q	(Hong Kong) Liu Tsz-Ling	11	6	5	6
11	(Hong Kong) Annie Au	9	11	11	11
10	(India) Joshna Chinappa	12	11	11
Q	(Egypt) Nadine Shahin	10	3	6
(Denmark) Line Hansen	5	5	7
8	(Egypt) Omn. Abdel Kawy	11	11	11
7	(United States) Amanda Sobhy	11	11	11
(Hong Kong) Joey Chan	3	4	6
(England) Victoria Lust	5	4	11	16	10
12	(England) Sarah-Jane Perry	11	11	7	14	12
16	(Egypt) Nour El Tayeb	8	11	8	13	11
(Australia) Donna Urquhart	11	9	11	11	7
(Australia) Rachael Grinham	11	3	4	6
3	(Egypt) Raneem El Weleily	4	11	11	11
4	(Malaysia) Nicol David	11	8	11	5	11
Q	(Wales) Tesni Evans	8	11	4	11	5
Q	(Guyana) Nicolette Fernandes	5	5	8
9	(New Zealand) Joelle King	11	11	11
14	(England) Jenny Duncalf	11	11	7	16	7
WC	(Hong Kong) Ho Tze-Lok	1	4	11	18	11
(India) Dipika Pallikal	4	5	11	11	7
6	(France) Camille Serme	11	11	8	6	11
5	(Egypt) Nouran Gohar	11	11	11
Q	(United States) Olivia Blatchford	8	7	7
Q	(Malaysia) Low Wee Wern	5	8	7
13	(England) Alison Waters	11	11	11
15	(England) Emily Whitlock	11	11	11
Q	(Egypt) Mariam Metwally	5	4	9
Q	(Egypt) Hania El Hammamy	3	8	11	11	7
2	(England) Laura Massaro	11	11	6	9	11

Second round
1	(Egypt) Nour El Sherbini	18	11	6	11
11	(Hong Kong) Annie Au	16	5	11	7
10	(India) Joshna Chinappa	8	10	4
8	(Egypt) Omn. Abdel Kawy	11	12	11
7	(United States) Amanda Sobhy	11	11	9	11
12	(England) Sarah-Jane Perry	3	6	11	7
16	(Egypt) Nour El Tayeb	11	7	11	11
3	(Egypt) Raneem El Weleily	9	11	7	5
4	(Malaysia) Nicol David	11	7	9	11	11
9	(New Zealand) Joelle King	7	11	11	8	5
WC	(Hong Kong) Ho Tze-Lok	5	5	4
6	(France) Camille Serme	11	11	11
5	(Egypt) Nouran Gohar	11	11	11
13	(England) Alison Waters	5	6	7
15	(England) Emily Whitlock	7	11	5	2
2	(England) Laura Massaro	11	9	11	11

Quarter finals
1	(Egypt) Nour El Sherbini	11	11	11
8	(Egypt) Omn. Abdel Kawy	6	7	5
7	(United States) Amanda Sobhy	11	11	11
16	(Egypt) Nour El Tayeb	6	4	8
4	(Malaysia) Nicol David	11	13	7	11
6	(France) Camille Serme	8	11	11	2
5	(Egypt) Nouran Gohar	11	11	8	8	14
2	(England) Laura Massaro	8	9	11	11	12

Semi finals
1	(Egypt) Nour El Sherbini	10	5	6
7	(United States) Amanda Sobhy	12	11	11
Final
7	(United States) Amanda Sobhy	11	10	7	8
5	(Egypt) Nouran Gohar	6	12	11	11
4	(Malaysia) Nicol David	9	7	13	9
5	(Egypt) Nouran Gohar	11	11	11	11

== See also ==
- Hong Kong Open (squash)
- Men's Hong Kong squash Open 2016
- 2016–17 PSA World Series

Preceded by British Open; England (Hull); 2016	PSA World Series 2016–17; Hong Kong Open; Hong Kong; 2016	Succeeded by United States Open; United States (Philadelphia); 2016
