= 2020 Women's PSA World Tour Finals =

PSA World Tour Finals
- 2nd Women's PSA World Tour Finals
- Location: Cairo, Egypt
- Venue: Mall of Arabia
- Date: 28 Sep.–3 Oct. 2020
- Website worldtourfinals.com
- Prize money: $185,000

Results
- Champion: Hania El Hammamy (EGY)
- Runner-up: Nour El Tayeb (EGY)
- Semi-finalists: Joelle King (NZL); Nour El Sherbini (EGY)

The 2020 CIB Women's PSA World Series Finals was the second women's edition of the PSA World Tour Finals (Prize money : $185,000) after the renaming of PSA World Series. The top 8 players in the 2019–20 PSA World Tour are qualified for the event. The event took place at Mall of Arabia, Cairo in Egypt from 28 September–3 October 2020.

It was the second edition under the PSA World Tour Finals label after the PSA renamed PSA World Series to current PSA World Tour Finals. CIB remains as the title sponsor.

Defending champion Raneem El Weleily could not defend last year title as she announced its retirement on 25 June 2020. Hania El Hammamy won its first PSA Finals in his first Finals appearance after defeating compatriot Nour El Tayeb 3–2 in the Final. El Hammamy went 2–0 down, but managed to turn it around to win 3–2.

== PSA World Ranking Points ==
PSA also awards points towards World Ranking. Points are awarded as follows:

PSA World Tour Finals		Ranking Points				
Rank	Prize money US$	Winner	Runner up	3/4	Round-Robin Match Win	Undefeated bonus
World Tour Finals	$185,000	1000	550	200	150	150

=== Match points distribution ===
Points towards the standings are awarded when the following scores:

Match score	Points
2–0 win	4 points
2–1 win	3 points
1–2 loss	1 point
0–2 loss	0 point

== Qualification & Seeds ==
=== Qualification ===
Top eight players at 2019–20 PSA World Tour standings qualifies to Finals.

World Championship
177.5	1st Round	290	2nd Round
475	3rd Round	780	Quarterfinalist
1270	Semifinalist	2090	Runner-up
**3175**	Winner		

Platinum
152.5	1st Round	250	2nd Round
410	3rd Round	675	Quarterfinalist
1100	Semifinalist	1810	Runner-up
**2750**	Winner		

Gold
160	1st Round	260	2nd Round
430	Quarterfinalist	700	Semifinalist
1150	Runner-up	**1750**	Winner

Silver
112.5	1st Round	182.5	2nd Round
300	Quarterfinalist	490	Semifinalist
805	Runner-up	**1225**	Winner

Bronze
80	1st Round	130	2nd Round
215	Quarterfinalist	350	Semifinalist
575	Runner-up	**875**	Winner

Top 16 Women's World Tour Standings 2019–20
Rank	Player	Tournaments Played	CHN (China)	FRA (France)	USA (United States)	USA (United States)	EGY (Egypt)	USA (United States)	USA (United States)	USA (United States)	USA (United States)	USA (United States)	EGY (Egypt)	Total Points
1	(Egypt) **Nour El Sherbini**	4	–	–	–	–	**3175**	1810	–	–	–	**2750**	1810	9545
2	(Egypt) Raneem El Weleily‡	7	1150	–	**1750**	1100	2090	675	–	–	–	1810	675	9250
3	(Egypt) **Nour El Tayeb**	9	**1750**	–	1150	1810	780	410	575	**875**	–	250	1100	8700
4	(Egypt) **Nouran Gohar**	7	700	–	–	**2750**	1270	1100	**875**	–	–	1100	410	8205
5	(France) **Camille Serme**	8	–	**1225**	700	1100	780	**2750**	350	–	–	675	410	7990
6	(Egypt) **Hania El Hammamy**	8	700	490	–	410	1270	410	–	–	350	410	**2750**	6790
7	(England) **Sarah-Jane Perry**	9	–	490	430	675	780	675	–	575	575	1100	1100	6400
8	(United States) **Amanda Sobhy**	9	–	805	430	675	177.5	250	130	–	**875**	675	675	4692.5
9	(New Zealand) **Joelle King**	9	430	–	430	410	780	1100	350	350	–	250	250	4350
10	(Egypt) Salma Hany	9	430	–	260	410	475	675	215	130	–	410	250	3255
11	(United States) Olivia Blatchford Clyne	9	–	300	260	250	290	410	–	215	350	675	410	3160
12	(India) Joshna Chinappa	8	–	–	700	410	475	410	130	350	–	250	250	2975
13	(Egypt) Yathreb Adel	7	430	–	–	410	475	410	130	–	–	410	410	2675
14	(Egypt) Rowan Elaraby	6	–	–	–	675	290	250	–	–	215	675	410	2515
15	(Egypt) Nadine Shahin	8	430	182.5	–	250	290	250	–	130	–	410	410	2352.5
16	(Belgium) Nele Gilis	9	–	182.5	260	250	290	250	80	–	215	410	410	2347.5

Bold – Players qualified for the Finals
(*) – Winners of Platinum's tournaments automatically qualifies for Finals.
(‡) – Announced retirement from squash on 25 June 2020.

=== Seeds ===
1. (Egypt) Nour El Sherbini
2. (Egypt) Nour El Tayeb
3. (Egypt) Nouran Gohar
4. (France) Camille Serme
5. (Egypt) Hania El Hammamy
6. (England) Sarah-Jane Perry
7. (United States) Amanda Sobhy
8. (New Zealand) Joelle King

== Group stage results ==
Times are Eastern European Time (UTC+02:00). To the best of three games.

=== Group A ===
Date	Time	Player 1	Player 2	Score
28 September	18:00	Nour El Sherbini (EGY)	Joelle King (NZL)	11–9, 11–1
28 September	19:30	Nouran Gohar (EGY)	Sarah-Jane Perry (ENG)	11–7, 12–10
29 September	19:30	Nour El Sherbini (EGY)	Nouran Gohar (EGY)	11–6, 11–7
29 September	21:00	Sarah-Jane Perry (ENG)	Joelle King (NZL)	7–11, 13–11, 8–11
30 September	21:00	Nour El Sherbini (EGY)	Sarah-Jane Perry (ENG)	11–7, 12–10
1 October	18:00	Nouran Gohar (EGY)	Joelle King (NZL)	10–12, 7–11

==== Standings ====
Pos	Team	Pld	W	L	GF	GA	GD	Pts	Qualification
1	Nour El Sherbini (EGY)	3	3	0	67	40	+27	12	Advancing to Semifinals
2	Joelle King (NZL)	3	2	1	66	67	−1	7	Advancing to Semifinals
3	Nouran Gohar (EGY)	3	1	2	53	62	−9	4	
4	Sarah-Jane Perry (ENG)	3	0	3	62	79	−17	1	

Source: PSA World Tour Finals

=== Group B ===
Date	Time	Player 1	Player 2	Score
28 September	21:00	Nour El Tayeb (EGY)	Amanda Sobhy (USA)	11–5, 11–5
29 September	18:00	Camille Serme (FRA)	Hania El Hammamy (EGY)	11–9, 10–12, 7–11
30 September	18:00	Nour El Tayeb (EGY)	Camille Serme (FRA)	8–11, 5–11
30 September	19:30	Hania El Hammamy (EGY)	Amanda Sobhy (USA)	12–10, 11–8
1 October	19:30	Nour El Tayeb (EGY)	Hania El Hammamy (EGY)	8–11, 11–3, 11–7
1 October	21:00	Camille Serme (FRA)	Amanda Sobhy (USA)	9–11, 5–11

==== Standings ====
Pos	Team	Pld	W	L	GF	GA	GD	Pts	Qualification
1	Hania El Hammamy (EGY)	3	2	1	76	76	0	8	Advancing to Semifinals
2	Nour El Tayeb (EGY)	3	2	1	65	53	+12	7	Advancing to Semifinals
3	Camille Serme (FRA)	3	1	2	64	67	−3	5	
4	Amanda Sobhy (USA)	3	1	2	50	59	−9	4	

Source: PSA World Tour Finals

== Knockout stage ==
Semi finals (2 October)
1	Nour El Sherbini (EGY)	11	6	3
2	Nour El Tayeb (EGY)	5	11	11
5	Hania El Hammamy (EGY)	18	11	11
8	Joelle King (NZL)	20	8	2

Final (3 October)
2	Nour El Tayeb (EGY)	11	11	9	4	3
5	Hania El Hammamy (EGY)	9	9	11	11	11

=== Semifinal ===
To the best of three games.

Date	Time	Player 1	Player 2	Score
2 October	18:30	Nour El Sherbini (EGY)	Nour El Tayeb (EGY)	11–5, 6–11, 3–11
2 October	19:45	Hania El Hammamy (EGY)	Joelle King (NZL)	18–20, 11–8, 11–2

=== Final ===
To the best of five games.

Date	Time	Player 1	Player 2	Score
3 October	19:00	Nour El Tayeb (EGY)	Hania El Hammamy (EGY)	11–9, 11–9, 9–11, 4–11, 3–11

2020 Women's PSA World Tour Finals winner
(Egypt)
Hania El Hammamy
First title

== See also ==
- 2020 Men's PSA World Tour Finals
- 2019–20 PSA World Tour
- 2020–21 PSA World Tour
- 2019–20 PSA World Tour Finals
- PSA World Tour Finals
