= Women's United States Open (squash) 2016 =

US Open 2016
- 17th Women's U.S. Open

Details
- Event name: Delaware Investments United States Open 2016
- Location: (United States) Philadelphia, Pennsylvania
- Venue: Daskalakis Athletic Center
- Website www.usopensquash.com

Women's Winner
- Category: World Series
- Prize money: $150,000
- Year: World Tour 2016

The Women's United States Squash Open 2016 is the women's edition of the 2016 United States Open (squash), which is a WSA World Series event (prize money: $150 000). The event took place at the Daskalakis Athletic Center in Philadelphia, Pennsylvania in the United States from the 8th of October to the 15th of October. Camille Serme won her first US Open trophy, beating Nour El Sherbini in the final.

== Prize money and ranking points ==
For 2016, the prize purse was $150,000. The prize money and points breakdown is as follows:

Prize money US Open (2016)
Event	W	F	SF	QF	2R	1R
Points (PSA)	2625	1725	1050	640	375	190
Prize money	$17,000	$10,400	$6,400	$3,800	$2,250	$1,325

== Seeds ==
1. (Egypt) Nour El Sherbini (final)
2. (England) Laura Massaro (quarterfinals)
3. (Malaysia) Nicol David (quarterfinals)
4. (Egypt) Nouran Gohar (quarterfinals)
5. (Egypt) Raneem El Weleily (semifinals)
6. (France) Camille Serme (champion)
7. (United States) Amanda Sobhy (semifinals)
8. (England) Alison Waters (quarterfinals)
9. (India) Joshna Chinappa (second round)
10. (New Zealand) Joelle King (second round)
11. (Egypt) Nour El Tayeb (second round)
12. (Hong Kong) Annie Au (second round)
13. (England) Sarah-Jane Perry (second round)
14. (England) Emily Whitlock (second round)
15. (England) Victoria Lust (first round)
16. (England) Jenny Duncalf (first round)

== Draw and results ==
First round
1	(Egypt) Nour El Sherbini	13	11	11
Q	(Japan) Misaki Kobayashi	11	9	2
(Australia) Rachael Grinham	7	5	8
13	(England) Sarah-Jane Perry	11	11	11
16	(England) Jenny Duncalf	8	11	8	15	5
Q	(Egypt) Salma Hany Ibrahim	11	7	11	13	11
WC	(United States) Sabrina Sobhy	8	5	3
8	(England) Alison Waters	11	11	11
5	(Egypt) Raneem El Weleily	11	11	11
Q	(Belgium) Nele Gilis	6	4	3
Q	(Egypt) Nadine Shahin	8	7	10
10	(New Zealand) Joelle King	11	11	12
11	(Egypt) Nour El Tayeb	11	11	14
Q	(England) Fiona Moverley	4	8	12
(Denmark) Line Hansen	3	6	6
3	(Malaysia) Nicol David	11	11	11
4	(Egypt) Nouran Gohar	11	11	11
Q	(France) Coline Aumard	6	5	5
Q	(Wales) Tesni Evans	13	11	10	8	7
14	(England) Emily Whitlock	11	6	12	11	11
15	(England) Victoria Lust	9	11	5	11	6
(Australia) Donna Urquhart	11	7	11	6	11
(India) Dipika Pallikal	11	3	1	4
7	(United States) Amanda Sobhy	7	11	11	11
6	(France) Camille Serme	11	11	11
(Malaysia) Delia Arnold	4	6	3
(Hong Kong) Joey Chan	6	4	6
12	(Hong Kong) Annie Au	11	11	11
9	(India) Joshna Chinappa	7	4	11	11	11
(Egypt) Heba El Torky	11	11	7	10	7
Q	(Egypt) Kanzy El Defrawy	6	9	7
2	(England) Laura Massaro	11	11	11

Second round
1	(Egypt) Nour El Sherbini	11	11	8	11
13	(England) Sarah-Jane Perry	5	4	11	6
Q	(Egypt) Salma Hany Ibrahim	14	1	11	4	12
8	(England) Alison Waters	12	11	7	11	14
5	(Egypt) Raneem El Weleily	1	11	11	11
10	(New Zealand) Joelle King	11	9	7	8
11	(Egypt) Nour El Tayeb	11	11	4	6	7
3	(Malaysia) Nicol David	4	9	11	11	11
4	(Egypt) Nouran Gohar	11	11	18
14	(England) Emily Whitlock	7	8	16
(Australia) Donna Urquhart	7	11	5	5
7	(United States) Amanda Sobhy	11	5	11	11
6	(France) Camille Serme	11	11	11
12	(Hong Kong) Annie Au	5	6	6
9	(India) Joshna Chinappa	5	5	6
2	(England) Laura Massaro	11	11	11

Quarter finals
1	(Egypt) Nour El Sherbini	11	11	11
8	(England) Alison Waters	7	2	6
5	(Egypt) Raneem El Weleily	8	11	12	11
3	(Malaysia) Nicol David	11	8	10	9
4	(Egypt) Nouran Gohar	7	11	7	4
7	(United States) Amanda Sobhy	11	6	11	11
6	(France) Camille Serme	11	8	11	6	11
2	(England) Laura Massaro	8	11	2	11	6

Semi finals
1	(Egypt) Nour El Sherbini	8	11	11	11
5	(Egypt) Raneem El Weleily	11	6	8	3
Final
1	(Egypt) Nour El Sherbini	8	11	10	9
6	(France) Camille Serme	11	7	12	11
7	(United States) Amanda Sobhy	6	9	12	5
6	(France) Camille Serme	11	11	10	11

== See also ==
- United States Open (squash)
- 2016–17 PSA World Series
- Men's United States Open (squash) 2016

Preceded by Hong Kong Open; Hong Kong; 2016	PSA World Series 2016–17; US Open; United States (Philadelphia); 2016	Succeeded by Tournament of Champions; United States (New York); 2017
