= 2017 Women's PSA World Series Finals =

PSA World Series Finals 2017
- 4th PSA Women's World Series Finals

Details
- Event name: PSA World Series Finals 2016–2017
- Location: Dubai, United Arab Emirates
- Venue: Dubai Opera
- Website www.worldseriesfinals.com

Men's Winner
- Category: PSA World Series Finals
- Prize money: $160,000
- Year: World Series 2016–2017

The 2017 Women's PSA World Series Finals is the women's edition of the 2017 PSA World Series Finals (Prize money : $160 000). The top 8 players in the 2016–17 PSA World Series are qualified for the event. The event took place in Dubai in the United Arab Emirates from 6 to 10 June 2017.

== Seeds ==
1. (France) Camille Serme (semifinals)
2. (Egypt) Nour El Sherbini (final)
3. (England) Laura Massaro (champion)
4. (Egypt) Raneem El Weleily (first round)
5. (Egypt) Nouran Gohar (semifinals)
6. (Malaysia) Nicol David (first round)
7. (England) Sarah-Jane Perry (first round)
8. (England) Alison Waters (first round)

== Group stage results ==
=== Pool A ===
(Egypt) Raneem El Weleily	11	11	3	-	13	3	11	(Egypt) Nouran Gohar
(France) Camille Serme	9	11	11	-	11	5	3	(England) Alison Waters

(France) Camille Serme	11	12	14	-	6	14	12	(Egypt) Nouran Gohar
(Egypt) Raneem El Weleily	16	11		-	14	7		(England) Alison Waters

(Egypt) Nouran Gohar	11	14		-	7	12		(England) Alison Waters
(France) Camille Serme	11	7	12	-	7	11	10	(Egypt) Raneem El Weleily

Rank	Player	Match	Win	Lost	Games
1	(France) Camille Serme	3	3	0	6
2	(Egypt) Nouran Gohar	3	2	1	5
3	(Egypt) Raneem El Weleily	3	1	2	4
4	(England) Alison Waters	3	0	3	1

=== Pool B ===
(England) Laura Massaro	12	12		-	10	10		(Malaysia) Nicol David
(Egypt) Nour El Sherbini	11	9	4	-	9	11	11	(England) Sarah-Jane Perry

(Egypt) Nour El Sherbini	11	11	-	6	9	(Malaysia) Nicol David
(Egypt) Laura Massaro	11	14	-	6	12	(England) Sarah-Jane Perry

(Malaysia) Nicol David	11	4	8	-	6	11	11	(England) Sarah-Jane Perry
(Egypt) Nour El Sherbini	6	12	11	-	11	10	2	(England) Laura Massaro

Rank	Player	Match	Win	Lost	Games
1	(England) Laura Massaro	3	2	1	5
2	(Egypt) Nour El Sherbini	3	2	1	5
3	(England) Sarah-Jane Perry	3	2	1	4
4	(Malaysia) Nicol David	3	0	3	1

== Draw and results ==
Semi finals
1	(France) Camille Serme	17	3	10
2	(Egypt) Nour El Sherbini	15	11	12
5	(Egypt) Nouran Gohar	14	10	7
3	(England) Laura Massaro	12	12	11

Final
2	(Egypt) Nour El Sherbini	8	10	5
3	(England) Laura Massaro	11	12	11

== See also ==
- 2016–17 PSA World Series
- PSA World Series Finals
- PSA World Tour 2016
- 2017 PSA World Tour
