= 2020 Men's PSA World Tour Finals =

PSA World Tour Finals
- 2nd Men's PSA World Tour Finals
- Location: Cairo, Egypt
- Venue: Mall of Arabia
- Date: 28 Sep.–3 Oct. 2020
- Website worldtourfinals.com
- Prize money: $185,000

Results
- Champion: Marwan El Shorbagy (EGY)
- Runner-up: Karim Abdel Gawad (EGY)
- Semi-finalists: Ali Farag (EGY); Joel Makin (WAL)

The 2020 CIB Men's PSA World Series Finals was the men's edition of the PSA World Tour Finals (Prize money : $185,000). The top 8 players in the 2019–20 PSA World Tour are qualified for the event. The event took place at Mall of Arabia, Cairo in Egypt from 28 September–3 October 2020.

It's the second edition under the PSA World Tour Finals label after the PSA renamed PSA World Series to current PSA World Tour Finals. CIB remains as the title sponsor.

Karim Abdel Gawad was the defending champion but was beaten in the Final to Marwan El Shorbagy. Marwan won the Final 3–0 (11–6, 11–5, 11–3) (47min) in his only second World Tour Finals appearance.

== PSA World Ranking Points ==
PSA also awards points towards World Ranking. Points are awarded as follows:

PSA World Tour Finals		Ranking Points				
Rank	Prize money US$	Winner	Runner up	3/4	Round-Robin Match Win	Undefeated bonus
World Tour Finals	$185,000	1000	550	200	150	150

=== Match points distribution ===
Points towards the standings are awarded when the following scores:

Match score	Points
2–0 win	4 points
2–1 win	3 points
1–2 loss	1 point
0–2 loss	0 point

== Qualification & Seeds ==
=== Qualification ===
Top eight players at 2019–20 PSA World Tour standings qualifies to Finals.

World Championship
177.5	1st Round	290	2nd Round
475	3rd Round	780	Quarterfinalist
1270	Semifinalist	2090	Runner-up
**3175**	Winner		

Platinum
152.5	1st Round	250	2nd Round
410	3rd Round	675	Quarterfinalist
1100	Semifinalist	1810	Runner-up
**2750**	Winner		

Gold
160	1st Round	260	2nd Round
430	Quarterfinalist	700	Semifinalist
1150	Runner-up	**1750**	Winner

Silver
112.5	1st Round	182.5	2nd Round
300	Quarterfinalist	490	Semifinalist
805	Runner-up	**1225**	Winner

Bronze
80	1st Round	130	2nd Round
215	Quarterfinalist	350	Semifinalist
575	Runner-up	**875**	Winner

Top 16 Men's PSA World Tour Standings 2019–20
Rank	Player	Tournaments Played	CHN (China)	FRA (France)	USA (United States)	USA (United States)	EGY (Egypt)	QAT (Qatar)	ENG (England)	USA (United States)	USA (United States)	USA (United States)	CAN (Canada)	USA (United States)	ENG (England)	Total Points
1	(Egypt) Mohamed El Shorbagy‡	8	**1750**	–	**1750**	1810	–	780	1150	**2750**	–	–	–	675	**1750**	12415
2	(Egypt) **Ali Farag**	6	1150	–	–	**2750**	1810	–	–	1100	–	–	–	**2750**	1150	10710
3	(Egypt) **Tarek Momen**	8	–	–	1150	1100	250	**3175**	–	1810	–	–	**1225**	1100	700	10510
4	(New Zealand) **Paul Coll**	8	–	**1225**	–	675	1100	2090	700	675	–	–	805	1810	–	9080
5	(Egypt) **Karim Abdel Gawad**	7	–	–	–	675	**2750**	475	**1750**	1100	–	–	–	1100	260	8110
6	(Egypt) **Marwan El Shorbagy**	10	700	–	700	250	675	1270	430	250	–	300	–	250	700	5525
7	(Peru) **Diego Elías**	9	–	–	–	1100	250	780	260	250	–	**1225**	490	675	430	5460
8	(Wales) **Joel Makin**	10	–	805	430	410	1100	475	430	675	–	–	300	410	160	5195
9	(Germany) **Simon Rösner**	8	–	300	260	675	250	1270	–	675	–	–	–	675	260	4365
10	(India) Saurav Ghosal	9	700	–	–	250	410	475	430	410	575	–	–	250	430	3930
11	(Egypt) Fares Dessouky	7	–	300	–	250	675	475	–	–	**875**	–	–	250	430	3255
12	(Egypt) Mazen Hesham	9	430	–	–	410	410	290	430	250	–	–	300	410	160	3090
13	(France) Grégoire Marche	9	–	490	–	410	410	177.5	–	410	350	182.5	–	250	160	2840
14	(France) Mathieu Castagnet	9	–	300	260	250	–	290	260	250	–	–	490	410	260	2770
15	(Egypt) Zahed Salem	8	–	490	–	410	250	780	–	250	130	182.5	–	250	–	2742.5
16	(Egypt) Omar Mosaad	8	430	–	–	250	250	475	–	250	350	–	–	410	260	2675

Bold – Players qualified for the Finals
(*) – Winners of Platinum's tournaments automatically qualifies for Finals.
(‡) – Mohamed ElShorbay opts out to not play for personal reasons.

=== Seeds ===
1. (Egypt) Ali Farag
2. (Egypt) Tarek Momen
3. (New Zealand) Paul Coll
4. (Egypt) Karim Abdel Gawad
5. (Egypt) Marwan El Shorbagy
6. (Peru) Diego Elías
7. (Wales) Joel Makin
8. (Germany) Simon Rösner

== Group stage results ==
Times are Eastern European Time (UTC+02:00). To the best of three games.

=== Group A ===
Date	Time	Player 1	Player 2	Score
28 September	18:45	Ali Farag (EGY)	Simon Rösner (GER)	12–10, 11–6
28 September	20:15	Karim Abdel Gawad (EGY)	Diego Elías (PER)	11–9, 3–11, 5–11
29 September	20:15	Ali Farag (EGY)	Karim Abdel Gawad (EGY)	8–11, 11–4, 8–11
29 September	21:45	Diego Elías (PER)	Simon Rösner (GER)	11–8, 9–11, 6–11
30 September	20:15	Ali Farag (EGY)	Diego Elías (PER)	14–16, 11–5, 11–3
1 October	18:45	Karim Abdel Gawad (EGY)	Simon Rösner (GER)	13–11, 11–8

==== Standings ====
Pos	Team	Pld	W	L	GF	GA	GD	Pts	Qualification
1	Karim Abdel Gawad (EGY)	3	2	1	69	77	−8	8 (Note: Head-to-head: Gawad (11–8, 4–11, 11–8) Farag)	Advancing to Semifinals
2	Ali Farag (EGY)	3	2	1	86	66	+20	8	Advancing to Semifinals
3	Diego Elías (PER)	3	1	2	81	85	−4	5	
4	Simon Rösner (GER)	3	1	2	65	73	−8	3	

Source: PSA World Tour Finals

=== Group B ===
Date	Time	Player 1	Player 2	Score
28 September	21:45	Tarek Momen (EGY)	Joel Makin (WAL)	5–11, 11–6, 9–11
29 September	20:30	Paul Coll (NZL)	Marwan El Shorbagy (EGY)	6–11, 5–11
30 September	18:45	Tarek Momen (EGY)	Paul Coll (NZL)	9–11, 8–11
30 September	21:45	Marwan El Shorbagy (EGY)	Joel Makin (WAL)	11–8, 11–6
1 October	20:15	Tarek Momen (EGY)	Marwan El Shorbagy (EGY)	11–8, 11–3
1 October	21:45	Paul Coll (NZL)	Joel Makin (WAL)	3–11, 5–11

==== Standings ====
Pos	Team	Pld	W	L	GF	GA	GD	Pts	Qualification
1	Marwan El Shorbagy (EGY)	3	2	1	55	47	+8	8	Advancing to Semifinals
2	Joel Makin (WAL)	3	2	1	64	55	+9	7	Advancing to Semifinals
3	Tarek Momen (EGY)	3	1	2	64	61	+3	5	
4	Paul Coll (NZL)	3	1	2	41	61	−20	4	

Source: PSA World Tour Finals

== Knockout stage ==
Semi finals (2 October)
4	Karim Abdel Gawad (EGY)	11	11
7	Joel Makin (WAL)	9	8
5	Marwan El Shorbagy (EGY)	11	7	12
1	Ali Farag (EGY)	9	11	10

Final (3 October)
4	Karim Abdel Gawad (EGY)	6	5	3
5	Marwan El Shorbagy (EGY)	11	11	11

=== Semifinal ===
To the best of three games.

Date	Time	Player 1	Player 2	Score
2 October	19:15	Karim Abdel Gawad (EGY)	Joel Makin (WAL)	11–9, 11–8
2 October	20:30	Marwan El Shorbagy (EGY)	Ali Farag (EGY)	11–9, 7–11, 12–10

=== Final ===
To the best of five games.

Date	Time	Player 1	Player 2	Score
3 October	20:00	Karim Abdel Gawad (EGY)	Marwan El Shorbagy (EGY)	6–11, 5–11, 3–11

2020 Men's PSA World Tour Finals winner
(Egypt)
Marwan El Shorbagy
First title

== See also ==
- 2020 Women's PSA World Tour Finals
- 2019–20 PSA World Tour
- 2020–21 PSA World Tour
- 2019–20 PSA World Tour Finals
- PSA World Tour Finals
