= The Galleria, Hatfield =

Coordinates: 51.7611°N 0.2405°W

The Galleria

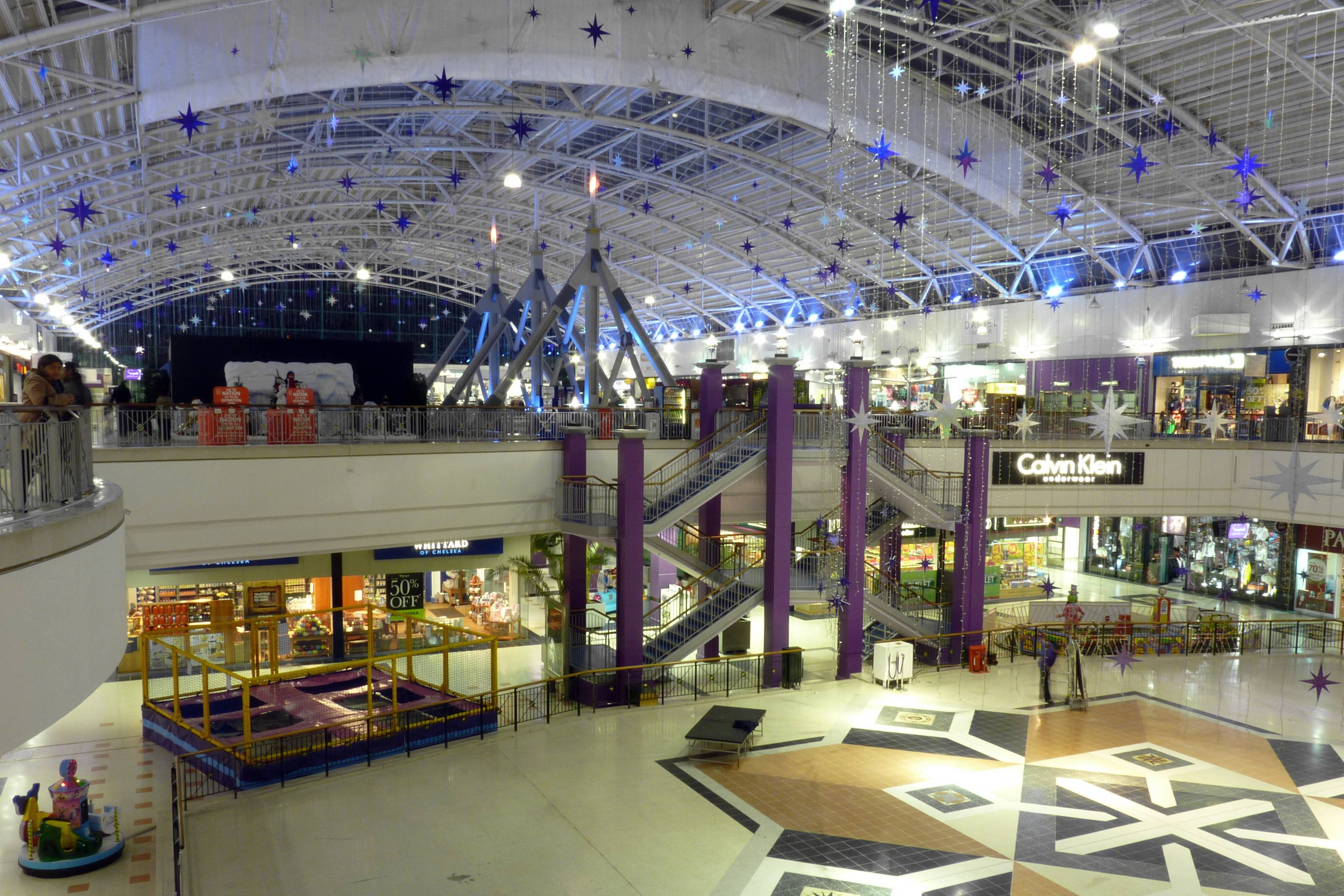
- The interior of the south wing
- Location: Hatfield, Hertfordshire, England
- Opened: circa 1991 or 1992
- Owner: Land Securities
- Num. of stores: > 80
- Floors: 2
- Parking: 1,700 spaces
- Website: www.thegalleria.co.uk

The Galleria is a designer outlet centre in Hatfield, Hertfordshire in South-East England.

== History ==
The Galleria was constructed in 1991 as part of a plan to increase retail space in Hatfield. The A1(M), a bypass of the old Great North Road from London, was built as a cut-and-cover tunnel with The Galleria on top, while also intentionally making an all-glass building to celebrate the aeronautic history of Hatfield.

It was a project of Gerald Carroll's Carroll Group and was budgeted at £50 million but cost £90 million by the time it was finished, 18 months late. Carroll refinanced the project and injected £30 million. It opened in 1991, but banker Samuel Montagu placed the scheme in receivership in 1992. Afterwards, records were found showing the purchase of bugging equipment and the employment of private detectives to watch the bankers involved.

The centre was converted to an outlet-led centre in 1996. Land Securities acquired the centre from Galleria Jersey Ltd in 2005 and took full control of the asset management of the centre in September 2006.

== Features ==
The centre occupies 311,000 sq ft of space. There are more than 80 retail outlets trading at The Galleria.

== Location and transport links ==
The centre is located 6 miles north of London's orbital motorway, the M25. It is situated on top of the Hatfield Tunnel which houses the A1(M) motorway.

The centre can be reached from Junctions 3 or 4 of the A1(M), which provides connections to the M25, or by the A414 from Hertford or St Albans. By public transport, the centre can be accessed from Hatfield railway station or St Albans City railway station. Both stations have bus links to the centre. Buses run from multiple places, such as Hemel Hempstead and Watford to the west, Stevenage and Welwyn Garden City to the north, Hertford to the east, and Barnet and Potters Bar in the south.

== Gallery ==
Outside view of The Galleria

Inside view of The Galleria

Inside view of The Galleria

Aerial view of The Galleria, from the north-west

Aerial view of The Galleria, from the south-west

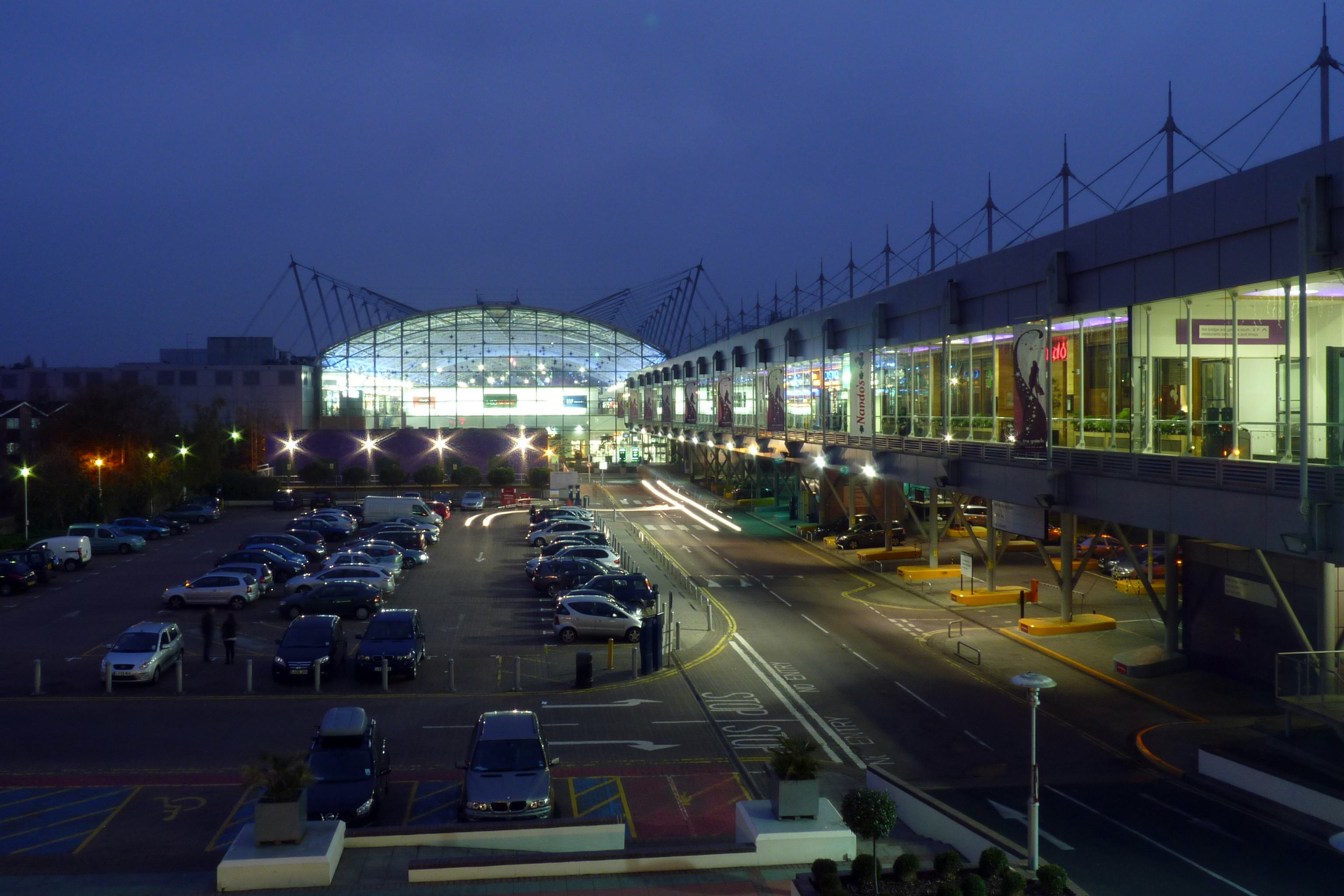
The south wing of The Galleria with the connecting bridge on the right

== See also ==
- List of shopping centres in the United Kingdom
- Gunwharf Quays - another outlet centre owned by Land Securities in Portsmouth, Hampshire
