= Hong Kong Open (squash) =

Annual squash tournament held in Hong Kong

Hong Kong Squash Open

Details
- Event name: Hong Kong Open
- Location: Hong Kong
- Venue: Hong Kong Squash Centre; Tsim Sha Tsui
- Website www.hksquash.org.hk

Men's Winner
- Category: World Series Platinum
- Prize money: $224,500

The Hong Kong Squash Open is an annual squash tournament held in Hong Kong in November. The tournament has both men and women's sections. The opening sections of the tournament are held at the Hong Kong Squash Centre, while the finals are contested in a glass show court outside the Hong Kong Cultural Centre.

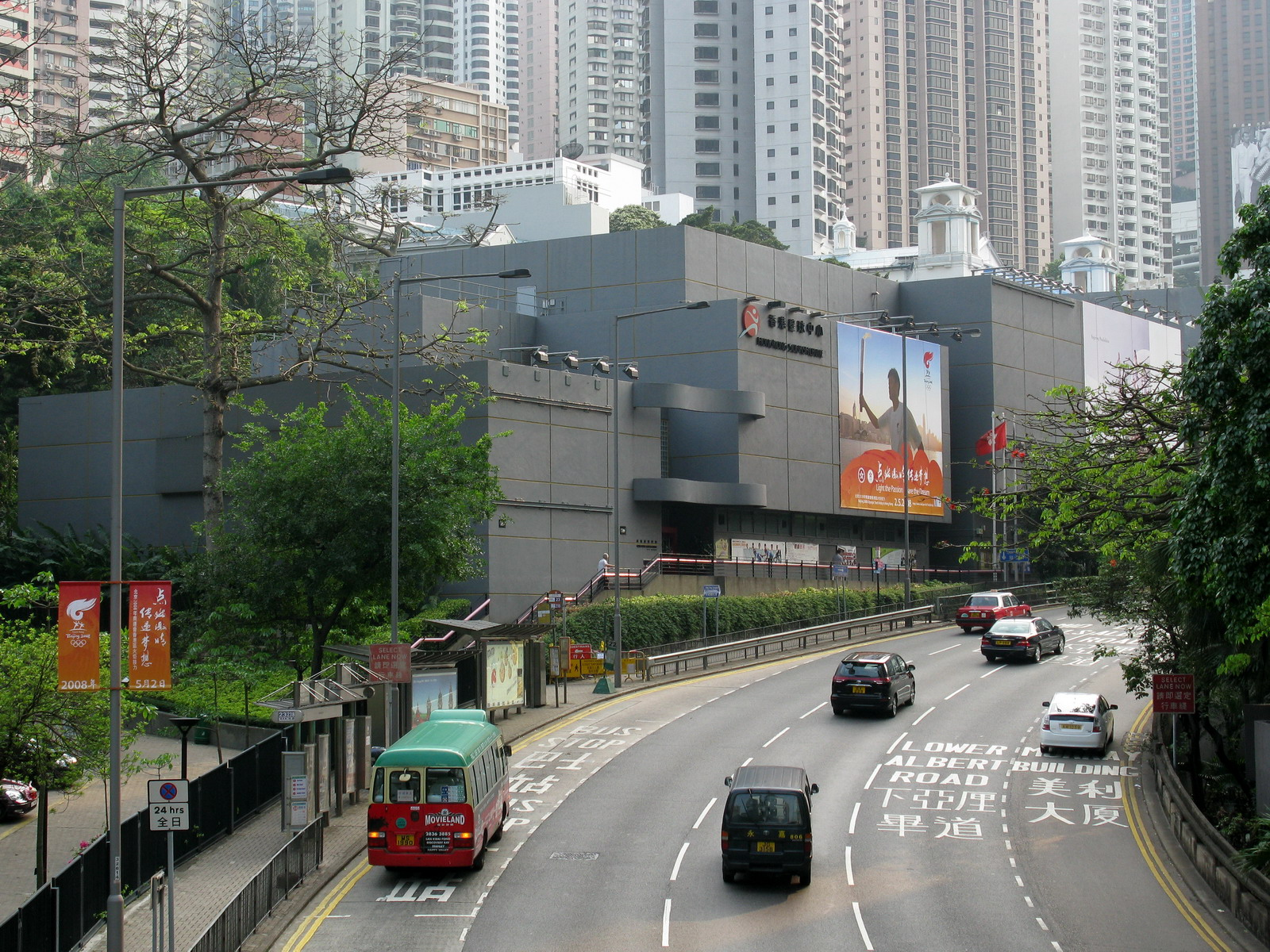
Hong Kong Squash Centre

== Past winners ==
=== Men's ===
Year	Winner	Runner-up	score	Notes/Ref
1985	(England) Phil Kenyon	(Australia) Steve Bowditch	9-3, 6-9, 9-3, 9-7	
1986	(Australia) Rodney Martin	(Australia) Tristan Nancarrow	9-6, 9-5, 9-2	
1987	(Pakistan) Jansher Khan	(Australia) Chris Dittmar	9-6, 9-2, 9-5	
1988	(Pakistan) Jansher Khan	(Australia) Chris Dittmar	15-11, 9-15, 15-6, 12-15, 15-1	
1989	(Pakistan) Jansher Khan	(Australia) Chris Dittmar	15-8, 16-17, 15-2, 15-6	
1990	(Pakistan) Jansher Khan	(Australia) Chris Robertson	15-6, 14-15, 15-10, 15-5	
1991	(Pakistan) Jansher Khan	(Australia) Tristan Nancarrow	16-17, 15-6, 15-17, 15-4, 15-5	
1992	(Australia) Rodney Martin	(Australia) Chris Dittmar	12-15, 15-13, 15-14, 15-9	
1993	(Australia) Brett Martin	(Australia) Rodney Martin	12-15, 15-12, 15-4, 15-6	
1994	(Pakistan) Jansher Khan	(Scotland) Peter Nicol	15-7, 15-10, 15-6	
1995	(Pakistan) Jansher Khan	(Australia) Brett Martin	15-12, 15-7, 15-3	
1996	(Australia) Rodney Eyles	(Pakistan) Jansher Khan	15-10, 15-10, 15-5	
1997	(Pakistan) Jansher Khan	(Canada) Jonathon Power	14-15, 15-12, 15-7, 15-2	
1998	(Canada) Jonathon Power	(Scotland) Peter Nicol	15-14, 15-11, 15-14	
1999	(Scotland) Peter Nicol	(Canada) Jonathon Power	15-10, 15-8, 15-8	
2000	(Scotland) Peter Nicol	(Canada) Jonathon Power	15-11, 15-10, 15-6	
2001	(Australia) David Palmer	(France) Thierry Lincou	15-13, 15-6, 15-9	
2002	(England) Peter Nicol	(Canada) Jonathon Power	15-13, 15-9, 14-15, 15-10	
2003 No competition
2004	(France) Thierry Lincou	(England) Nick Matthew	11-8, 11-4, 13-11	
2005 not held due to the 2005 World Open
2006	(Egypt) Amr Shabana	(Egypt) Ramy Ashour	13-11, 3-11, 11-5, 13-11	
2007	(Egypt) Amr Shabana	(France) Grégory Gaultier	11-13, 11-3, 11-6, 13-11	
2008	(Egypt) Amr Shabana	(France) Grégory Gaultier	11-9, 13-15, 8-11, 11-2, 11-3	
2009	(Egypt) Amr Shabana	(France) Grégory Gaultier	11-9, 9-11, 11-3, 5-2	
2010	(Egypt) Ramy Ashour	(France) Grégory Gaultier	10-12, 11-9, 11-9, 9-11, 11-9	
2011	(England) James Willstrop	(Egypt) Karim Darwish	11-9, 11-5, 11-4	
2012	(Egypt) Ramy Ashour	(England) James Willstrop	11-8, 3-11, 11-7, 11-6	
2013	(England) Nick Matthew	(Spain) Borja Golán	11-1, 11-8, 5-11, 11-5	
2014	(Egypt) Mohamed El Shorbagy	(France) Grégory Gaultier	11-9, 11-2, 4-11, 8-11, 11-4	
2015	(Egypt) Mohamed El Shorbagy	(Australia) Cameron Pilley	11-8, 11-6, 11-8	
2016	(Egypt) Ramy Ashour	(Egypt) Karim Abdel Gawad	11-9, 8-11, 11-6, 5-11, 11-6	
2017	(Egypt) Mohamed El Shorbagy	(Egypt) Ali Farag	11-6 5-11 11-4 7-11 11-3	
2018	(Egypt) Mohamed El Shorbagy	(Egypt) Ali Farag	11-6, 11-7, 11-7	
2019–2021 not held due to 2019–20 Hong Kong protests and COVID-19 pandemic
2022	(Egypt) Mostafa Asal	(Peru) Diego Elías	6-11, 6-11, 12-10, 11-9, 11-4	
2023	(New Zealand) Paul Coll	(Egypt) Ali Farag	10–12, 11–3, 11–8, 8–11, 11–9	
2024	(Egypt) Mostafa Asal	(Egypt) Ali Farag	11–5, 4–11, 11–8, 11–5	
2025	(Egypt) Mostafa Asal	(Egypt) Youssef Ibrahim	11-6, 11-8, 11-6	

=== Women's ===
Year	Winner	Runner-up	score	Notes/Ref
1993	(Australia) Michelle Martin	(Australia) Liz Irving	4-9, 9-0, 6-9, 9-4, 9-3	
1994	(Australia) Michelle Martin	(England) Cassie Jackman	9-6, 9-5, 7-9, 10-8	
1995–2000 No competition
2001	(New Zealand) Leilani Rorani	(Australia) Carol Owens	9-7, 9-6, 9-0	
2002	(Australia) Rachael Grinham	(United States) Natalie Grainger	9-3, 9-5, 9-7	
2003–2005 not held
2006	(Malaysia) Nicol David	(England) Tania Bailey	9-1, 10-8, 9-5	
2007	(Malaysia) Nicol David	(Australia) Natalie Grinham	9-3, 9-5, 10-8	
2008	(Malaysia) Nicol David	(Australia) Rachael Grinham	14-12, 11-13, 11-8, 11-8	
2009	(Malaysia) Nicol David	(Egypt) Omneya Abdel Kawy	11-4, 11-7, 11-7	
2010	(Malaysia) Nicol David	(England) Jenny Duncalf	11-6, 12-10, 12-10	
2011	(Malaysia) Nicol David	(Egypt) Raneem El Weleily	11-5, 11-4, 11-9	
2012	(Malaysia) Nicol David	(France) Camille Serme	11-9, 11-6, 8-11, 11-7	
2013	(Malaysia) Nicol David	(Egypt) Raneem El Weleily	11-7, 11-7, 12-10	
2014	(Malaysia) Nicol David	(Egypt) Nour El Tayeb	11-4, 12-10, 11-8	
2015	(Malaysia) Nicol David	(England) Laura Massaro	15-13, 11-5, 11-3	
2016	(Egypt) Nouran Gohar	(United States) Amanda Sobhy	6-11, 12-10, 11-7, 11-8	
2017	(Egypt) Nour El Sherbini	(Egypt) Raneem El Weleily	11-5, 11-8, 11-5	
2018	(New Zealand) Joelle King	(Egypt) Raneem El Weleily	11-4, 12-10, 19-17	
2019–2021 not held due to 2019–20 Hong Kong protests and COVID-19 pandemic
2022	(Egypt) Hania El Hammamy	(Egypt) Nour El Sherbini	15–13, 9–11, 11–3, 8–11, 11–9	
2023	(Egypt) Hania El Hammamy	(United States) Amanda Sobhy	6–5 retired	
2024	(Egypt) Nouran Gohar	(Egypt) Nour El Sherbini	6–11, 11–5, 11–9, 11–9	
2025	(Egypt) Nour El Sherbini	(United States) Olivia Weaver	11-5, 11-5, 11-7	
