= Men's Hong Kong squash Open 2016 =

Cathay Pacific Hong Kong Open 2016
- 30th Men's Hong Kong Open

Details
- Event name: Cathay Pacific Sun Hung Kai Financial Hong Kong Open 2016
- Location: Hong Kong
- Venue: Hong Kong Squash Centre
- Website http://www.hksquashopen.com/

Men's Winner
- Category: World Series
- Prize money: $150,000
- Year: World Tour 2016

The Men's Cathay Pacific Hong Kong Open 2016 is the men's edition of the 2016 Hong Kong Open, which is a PSA World Series event Platinum (Prize money: $150,000). The event took place in Hong Kong from 23 August to 28 August. Ramy Ashour won his third Hong Kong Open trophy, beating Karim Abdel Gawad in the final.

== Prize money and ranking points ==
For 2016, the prize purse was $150,000. The prize money and points breakdown is as follows:

Prize Money Hong Kong Open (2016)
Event	W	F	SF	QF	2R	1R
Points (PSA)	2625	1725	1050	640	375	190
Prize money	$23,625	$15,525	$9,450	$5,740	$3,375	$1,690

== Seeds ==
1. (Egypt) Mohamed El Shorbagy (second round)
2. (France) Grégory Gaultier (second round)
3. (Colombia) Miguel Ángel Rodríguez (first round)
4. (Egypt) Marwan El Shorbagy (second round)
5. (France) Mathieu Castagnet (second round)
6. (Egypt) Karim Abdel Gawad (final)
7. (Egypt) Ali Farag (quarterfinals)
8. (Egypt) Tarek Momen (second round)

== Draw and results ==
First round
1	(Egypt) Mohd El Shorbagy	11	12	7	11
(England) Chris Simpson	8	10	11	8
(Hong Kong) Leo Au	6	5	5
(Australia) Cameron Pilley	11	11	11
(Egypt) Mazen Hesham	11	11	11
Q	(Malaysia) Mohd Nafi. Adnan	5	8	7
(Spain) Borja Golán	4	5	9
6	(Egypt) Karim Abdel Gawad	11	11	11
8	(Egypt) Tarek Momen	16	11	11
Q	(Scotland) Alan Clyne	14	9	9
(England) Tom Richards	13	5	11	4
(England) James Willstrop	15	11	9	11
(Australia) Ryan Cuskelly	11	12	11
Q	(Egypt) Omar Abdel Meguid	7	10	2
WC	(Hong Kong) Tsz Fung Yip	13	10	2	11	11
3	(Colombia) Miguel Á. Rodríguez	12	11	11	3	6
4	(Egypt) Marwan El Shorbagy	11	11	6	9	11
Q	(Switzerland) Nicolas Müller	3	8	11	11	7
(Egypt) Ramy Ashour	11	11	12
(India) Saurav Ghosal	7	6	10
(Mexico) César Salazar	10	4	2
(Germany) Simon Rösner	12	11	11
Q	(Egypt) Zahed Mohamed	9	6	9
5	(France) Mathieu Castagnet	11	11	11
7	(Egypt) Ali Farag	11	11	10	11
Q	(Germany) Raphael Kandra	9	5	12	7
Q	(England) Joe Lee	6	4	7
(Hong Kong) Max Lee	11	11	11
(Egypt) Fares Dessouky	11	11	11
(Egypt) Mohd Abouelghar	8	9	6
Q	(France) Grégoire Marche	7	4	4
2	(France) Grégory Gaultier	11	11	11

Second round
1	(Egypt) Mohd El Shorbagy	9	11	11	12	9
(Australia) Cameron Pilley	11	8	9	14	11
(Egypt) Mazen Hesham	5	6	12	7
6	(Egypt) Karim Abdel Gawad	11	11	10	11
8	(Egypt) Tarek Momen	11	10	3	5
(England) James Willstrop	5	12	11	11
(Australia) Ryan Cuskelly	11	11	11
WC	(Hong Kong) Tsz Fung Yip	5	9	4
4	(Egypt) Marwan El Shorbagy	11	15	8	8	8
(Egypt) Ramy Ashour	9	13	11	11	11
(Germany) Simon Rösner	11	11	10	11
5	(France) Mathieu Castagnet	6	8	12	4
7	(Egypt) Ali Farag	8	11	11	9
(Hong Kong) Max Lee	11	7	13	11
(Egypt) Fares Dessouky	6	15	9	11	12
2	(France) Grégory Gaultier	11	13	11	6	10

Quarter finals
(Australia) Cameron Pilley	3	11	6	7
6	(Egypt) Karim Abdel Gawad	11	7	11	11
(England) James Willstrop	9	8	11	7
(Australia) Ryan Cuskelly	11	11	9	11
(Egypt) Ramy Ashour	12	7	11	11
(Germany) Simon Rösner	10	11	4	9
(Hong Kong) Max Lee	11	8	11	11
(Egypt) Fares Dessouky	6	11	9	8

Semi finals
6	(Egypt) Karim Abdel Gawad	11	11	6	12
(Australia) Ryan Cuskelly	7	6	11	10
Final
6	(Egypt) Karim Abdel Gawad	9	11	6	11	6
(Egypt) Ramy Ashour	11	8	11	5	11
(Egypt) Ramy Ashour	11	11	11
(Hong Kong) Max Lee	8	9	6

== See also ==
- Hong Kong Open (squash)
- 2016 Men's World Open Squash Championship
- 2016–17 PSA World Series

Preceded by El Gouna International; El Gouna (Egypt); 2016	PSA World Series 2016–17; Hong Kong Open; Hong Kong; 2016	Succeeded by United States Open; United States (Philadelphia); 2016
