= PSA Squash Tour Finals =

World squash event

Details
- Event name: PSA Squash Tour Finals
- Location: Paris (2026)
- Venue: Vitis Club (1994–1995); The Galleria, Hatfield (1996–1999); Broadgate Arena (1999–2006); National Squash Centre (2007–2008); Queen's Club (2009–2013); Westwood Club (2014); Burj Park (2016); Dubai Opera (2017); Emirates Golf Club (2018); Mall of Arabia (2019–2022); EDNC SODIC (2023); Hidden Valley Fieldhouse & Sports Park (2024); Revival Film Studios (2025); Centquatre-Paris (2026)
- Dates: 1993–
- Website worldtourfinals.com

Men's Winner
- Most recent champion(s): (Peru) Diego Elias (men's) (Egypt) Hania El Hammamy (women's)

The PSA Squash Tour Finals is the end of season championship of the PSA Squash Tour of male and female professional squash players. The top eight players in the current PSA World Events ranking is qualified for the event.

The eight players compete in two groups of four and play a round robin to determine the semi-finalists. The competition then becomes a knock-out competition to determine the World Series Finals champions. The event has been staged since 1993 in Zürich, Hatfield, London and Manchester and then London again before switching to Dubai in 2016. The event has prize money of $160,000. In 2012 the event added a women's section 2011 and 2013 has seen the women compete again during the day session, with the men competing in the evening session. The first edition of the women's competition was won by Nicol David.

Before the 2018–19 PSA World Tour season, it was named PSA World Series Finals. Starting from August 2024 onwards it was renamed PSA Squash Tour Finals.

== Venues ==
Location	Years	Venue
Zürich	1993–1994	Vitis Club
Hatfield	1996–1999	The Galleria, Hatfield
London	1999–2006	Broadgate Arena
Manchester	2007–2008	National Squash Centre
London	2009–2013	Queen's Club
Richmond, Virginia	2014	Westwood Club
Dubai	2016	Burj Park
Dubai	2017	Dubai Opera
Dubai	2018	Emirates Golf Club
Cairo	2019–2022	Mall of Arabia
New Cairo	2023	EDNC SODIC
Bellevue	2024	Hidden Valley Fieldhouse & Sports Park
Toronto	2025	Revival Film Studios
Paris	2026	Centquatre-Paris

== Results ==
=== Men's ===
Year	Location	Champion	Runner-up	Score in final	ref
1993	Zürich	Jansher Khan (PAK)	Chris Dittmar (AUS)	15–10, 10–15, 15–13, 15–8	
1994	Zürich	Jansher Khan (PAK)	Peter Marshall (ENG)	8–15, 15–8, 15–7, 15	
1995 Not held					
1996	Hatfield	Del Harris (ENG)	Brett Martin (AUS)	10–8, 7–9, 9–4, 6–9, 9–2	
1997	Hatfield	Jansher Khan (PAK)	Brett Martin (AUS)	9–7, 9–5, 9–2	
1998	Hatfield	Jansher Khan (PAK)	Simon Parke (ENG)	15–12, 13–15, 15–11, 15–10	
1999	London	Peter Nicol (SCO)	Ahmed Barada (EGY)	15–8, 9–15, 15–9, 15–11	
2000	London	Peter Nicol (SCO)	Simon Parke (ENG)	13–15, 15–9, 15–12, 12–15, 15–12	
2001	London	Peter Nicol (SCO)	David Palmer (AUS)	15–7, 15–11, 13–15, 17–14	
2002	London	David Palmer (AUS)	Thierry Lincou (FRA)	15–9, 10–15, 15–7, 10–15, 15–4	
2003	London	Jonathon Power (CAN)	Peter Nicol (SCO)	15–11, 10–15, 13–15, 15–4, 15–14	
2004	London	Thierry Lincou (FRA)	Joe Kneipp (AUS)	10–11 ^{(0–2)}, 11–9, 11–2, 11–1	
2005	London	Jonathon Power (CAN)	Thierry Lincou (FRA)	11–7, 11–6, 11–2	
2006	London	Anthony Ricketts (AUS)	Lee Beachill (ENG)	11–7, 6–11, 11–4, 11–10 ^{(2–0)}	
2007	Manchester	Ramy Ashour (EGY)	Grégory Gaultier (FRA)	11–10 ^{(2–0)}, 11–8, 4–11, 11–4	
2008	London	Grégory Gaultier (FRA)	Amr Shabana (EGY)	11–9, 11–8, 11–8	
2009	London	Grégory Gaultier (FRA)	Thierry Lincou (FRA)	11–6, 8–11, 11–5, 11–5	
2010 Cancelled, Nick Matthew (ENG) Amr Shabana (EGY)					
2011	London	Amr Shabana (EGY)	Grégory Gaultier (FRA)	6–11, 12–10, 11–7, 7–11, 11–8	
2012	London	Amr Shabana (EGY)	Nick Matthew (ENG)	4–11, 11–2, 11–4, 11–7	
2013	Richmond	Ramy Ashour (EGY)	Mohamed El Shorbagy (EGY)	15–17, 11–7, 11–4, 11–5	
2014 and 2015 not held					
2016	Dubai	Grégory Gaultier (FRA)	Cameron Pilley (AUS)	11–4, 11–5, 8–11, 11–6	
2017	Dubai	Mohamed El Shorbagy (EGY)	James Willstrop (ENG)	12–10, 11–9, 11–8	
2018	Dubai	Mohamed El Shorbagy (EGY)	Ali Farag (EGY)	9–11, 11–3, 11–9, 11–8	
2019	Cairo	Karim Abdel Gawad (EGY)	Mohamed Abouelghar (EGY)	12–10, 11–6, 5–11, 8–11, 12–10	
2020	Cairo	Marwan El Shorbagy (EGY)	Karim Abdel Gawad (EGY)	11–6, 11–5, 11–3	
2021	Cairo	Mostafa Asal (EGY)	Mohamed El Shorbagy (EGY)	12–14, 11–4, 11–7, 11–3	
2022	Cairo	Mostafa Asal (EGY)	Paul Coll (NZL)	13–11, 11–8, 11–7	
2023	New Cairo	Mostafa Asal (EGY)	Diego Elías (PER)	9–11, 11–6, 11–3, 11–5	
2024	Bellevue	Ali Farag (EGY)	Mostafa Asal (EGY)	11–5, 5–2^{rtd.}	
2025	Toronto	Joel Makin (WAL)	Mostafa Asal (EGY)	11–10, 11–7, 1–0^{rtd.}	
2026	Paris	Diego Elías (PER)	Paul Coll (NZL)	7–11, 11–4, 11–6, 11–9	

=== Women's ===
Year	Location	Champion	Runner-up	Score in final	ref
2011	London	Nicol David (MAS)	Madeline Perry (IRL)	11–9, 11–9, 11–9	
2012	London	Nicol David (MAS)	Laura Massaro (ENG)	11–3, 11–2, 11–9	
2013, 2014 and 2015 not held					
2016	Dubai	Laura Massaro (ENG)	Raneem El Weleily (EGY)	9–11, 11–6, 5–11, 12–10, 11–5	
2017	Dubai	Laura Massaro (ENG)	Nour El Sherbini (EGY)	11–8, 12–10, 11–5	
2018	Dubai	Nour El Sherbini (EGY)	Raneem El Weleily (EGY)	3–11, 8–11, 11–7, 11–4, 11–6	
2019	Cairo	Raneem El Weleily (EGY)	Camille Serme (FRA)	12–10, 11–6, 5–11, 8–11, 12–10	
2020	Cairo	Hania El Hammamy (EGY)	Nour El Tayeb (EGY)	9–11, 9–11, 11–9, 11–4, 11–3	
2021	Cairo	Nouran Gohar (EGY)	Hania El Hammamy (EGY)	11–9, 11–6, 8–11, 11–8	
2022	Cairo	Nour El Sherbini (EGY)	Nouran Gohar (EGY)	11–6, 11–8, 11–5	
2023	New Cairo	Nouran Gohar (EGY)	Hania El Hammamy (EGY)	10–11, 11–9, 9–11, 11–6, 12–10	
2024	Bellevue	Nouran Gohar (EGY)	Nour El Sherbini (EGY)	7–11, 11–2, 11–9, 11–10	
2025	Toronto	Nouran Gohar (EGY)	Olivia Weaver (USA)	11–10, 9–11, 11–8, 11–3	
2026	Paris	Hania El Hammamy (EGY)	Sivasangari Subramaniam (MYS)	11–6, 10–11, 11–8, 11–8	
