= Karim Gawad =

Egyptian squash player

Karim Abdel Gawad
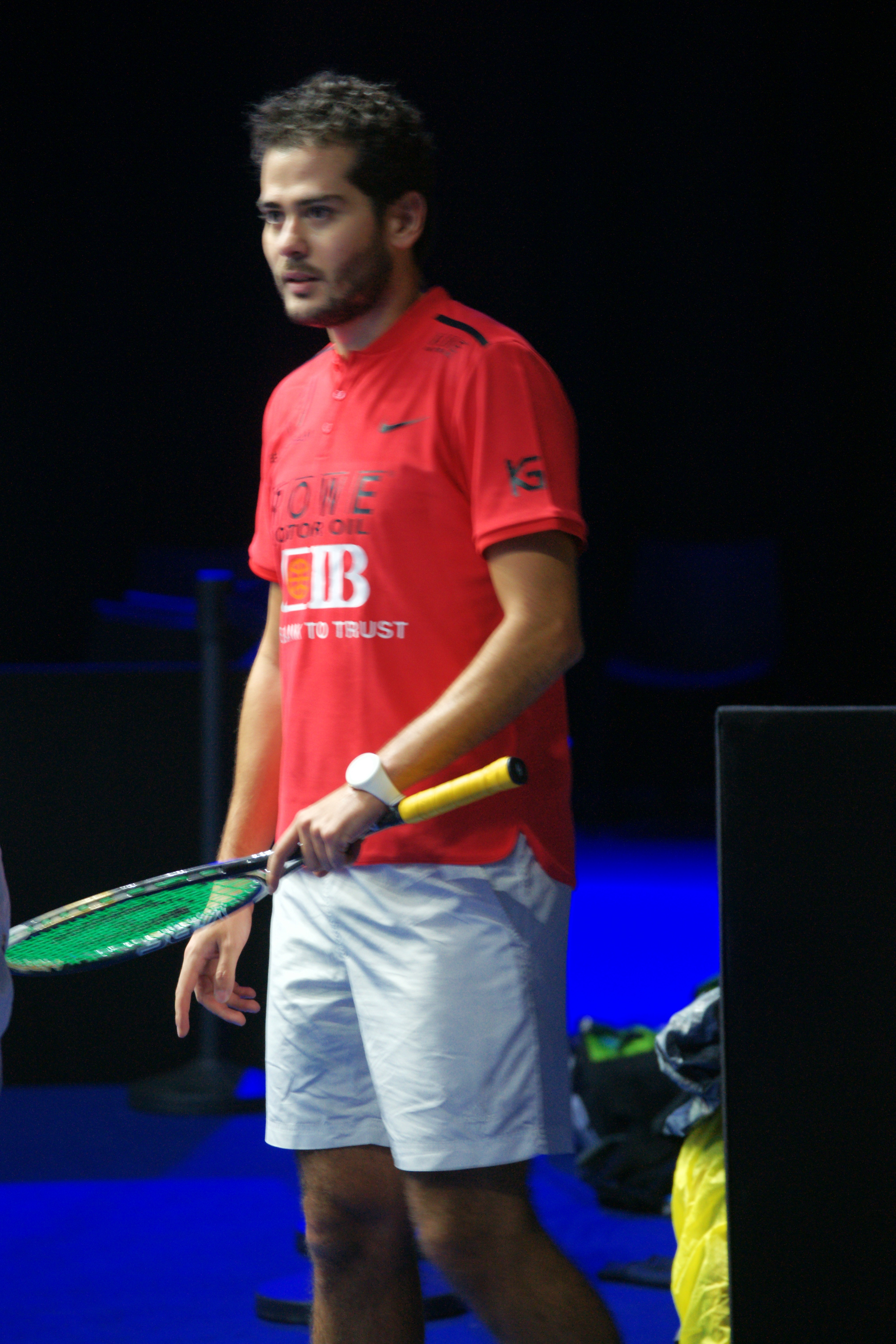
- Karim Abdel Gawad at the 2017 Men's World Team Squash Championships

Personal information
- Full name: Karim Abdel Gawad
- Nickname: The Baby Faced Assassin
- Born: 30 July 1991 (age 35) Alexandria, Egypt
- Height: 1.77 m (5 ft 10 in)
- Weight: 72 kg (159 lb)

Sport
- Handedness: Right Handed
- Turned pro: 2008
- Coached by: Hisham El Attar
- Retired: Active
- Racquet used: Harrow

Men's singles
- Highest ranking: No. 1 (May 2017)
- Current ranking: No. 6 (4 August 2025)
- Title: 31
- World Open: W (2016)
Medal record
Men's squash
Representing Egypt
World Championships
Gold medal – first place	2016 Cairo	Singles
Silver medal – second place	2023 Chicago	Singles
World Team Championships
Gold medal – first place	2017 Marseille	Team
Gold medal – first place	2019 Washington D.C.	Team
Gold medal – first place	2024 Hong Kong	Team

Karim Abdel Gawad (Arabic: كَرِيم عَبْد الْجَوَاد; born 30 July 1991) is an Egyptian professional squash player. He is a former world individual champion and world number 1 and a three-times world team champion.

== Career ==
In November 2016, he won the 2016 World Open Squash Championship in Cairo in Egypt against Ramy Ashour. He became the third Egyptian to win the World Championship after Amr Shabana and Ashour. He reached a career-high world ranking of World No. 1 in May 2017. Later in 2017, he was part of the Egyptian team that won the 2017 Men's World Team Squash Championships in France and repeated the success with Egypt at the 2019 Men's World Team Squash Championships in the United States.

In 2020, he suffered a major injury during the final of the 2020 Manchester Open. He damaged his heel, which eventually led to ten months out of squash and his world ranking plummeted as a result.

In May 2023, he reached the final of the 2023 PSA Men's World Squash Championship, after defeating second seed Diego Elías in the quarter final and third seed Mohamed El Shorbagy in the semi final. In the final he lost to compatriot Ali Farag but Gawad became the first unseeded player since Rodney Martin in 1991 to reach the world championship final. It completed a remarkable comeback from the injury he suffered the previous year.

Gawad was recalled to the Egyptian team for the 2024 Men's World Team Squash Championships in Hong Kong and secured a third career gold medal in the Championships.

In March 2025, Gawad won his 30th PSA title after securing victory in the Australian Open during the 2024–25 PSA Squash Tour and a 31st success arrived in October after he won the Silicon Valley Open during the 2025–26 PSA Squash Tour. In May 2026 he reached the semi-final of the 2026 Men's World Squash Championship.

== Titles and Finals ==
=== Major Finals (11) ===
Major tournaments include:

- PSA World Championships
- PSA World Tour Finals
- Top-tier PSA World Tour tournaments (Platinum/World Series/Super Series)

Year/Season	Tournament	Opponent	Result	Score
2016	Hong Kong Open	Ramy Ashour	Loss (1)	9-11 11-8 6-11 11-5 6–11
2016	PSA World Championships	Ramy Ashour	Win (1)	5-11 11-6 11-7 2-1 (retired)
2016	Qatar Classic	Mohamed El Shorbagy	Win (2)	12-10 15-13 11–7
2017	Tournament of Champions	Grégory Gaultier	Win (3)	6-11 11-6 12-10 11–6
2017	El Gouna International	Grégory Gaultier	Loss (2)	6-11 8-11 7–11
2018	Black Ball Open	Ali Farag	Win (4)	11-6 13-11 7-11 11–8
2019	El Gouna International	Ali Farag	Loss (3)	9-11 10-12 3–11
2018-19	PSA World Tour Finals	Mohamed Abouelghar	Win (5)	12-10 11-6 5-11 8-11 12–10
2019	Egyptian Open	Ali Farag	Win (6)	11-6 11-8 11–8
2019-20	PSA World Tour Finals	Marwan El Shorbagy	Loss (4)	6-11 5-11 3–11
2022-23	PSA World Championships	Ali Farag	Loss (5)	10-12 6-11 6–11

== World Open final appearances ==
Outcome	Year	Location	Opponent in the final	Score in the final
Winner	2016	Cairo, Egypt	(Egypt) Ramy Ashour	5–11, 11–6, 11–7, 2-1 (retired)
Runner-up	2023	Chicago, USA	(Egypt) Ali Farag	10–12, 6–11, 6–11

== Major World Series final appearances ==
=== Qatar Classic ===
Outcome	Year	Opponent in the final	Score in the final
Winner	2016	(Egypt) Mohamed El Shorbagy	12–10, 13–15, 11–7

=== Hong Kong Open ===
Outcome	Year	Opponent in the final	Score in the final
Runner-up	2016	(Egypt) Ramy Ashour	11–9, 8–11, 11–6, 5–11, 11–6

=== Al-Ahram International ===
Outcome	Year	Opponent in the final	Score in the final
Winner	2016	(Egypt) Ali Farag	11–4, 11–7, 11-5

Sporting positions
Preceded by Marwan El Shorbagy	PSA Young Player of the Year; 2013	Succeeded by Fares Dessouky
