= 2013 PSA World Tour =

PSA World Tour 2013

Details
- Event name: PSA World Tour 2013
- Tournaments: 115
- Categories: PSA World Championship; PSA World Series (7); PSA World Series Finals; PSA International (19); PSA Challenger (87)
- Website www.psaworldtour.com

Achievements
- World Number 1: (Egypt) Ramy Ashour (12 months)
- World Champion: (England) Nick Matthew

Awards
- Player of the year: (England) Nick Matthew
- Young player of the year: (Egypt) Karim Abdel Gawad

The PSA World Tour 2013 is the international squash tour organised circuit organized by the Professional Squash Association (PSA) for the 2013 squash season. The most important tournament in the series is the World Championship held in Manchester in England. The tour features three categories of regular events, World Series, which feature the highest prize money and the best fields, International and Challenger. The Tour is concluded by the PSA World Series Finals, the end of season championship for the top 8 rated players.

== 2013 Calendar ==
=== Key ===
World Championship
World Series Platinum
World Series Gold
International 70
International 50

=== World Championship ===
Tournament	Date	Champion	Runner-Up	Semifinalists	Quarterfinalists	Round of 16	
PSA World Championship 2013 (England) Manchester, England; World Championship $275,000 - Draw	27 October - 3 November 2013	(England) Nick Matthew; 11-9, 11–9, 11–13, 7–11, 11–2	(France) Grégory Gaultier	(Egypt) Ramy Ashour (Egypt) Mohamed El Shorbagy	(England) James Willstrop (Egypt) Amr Shabana (England) Daryl Selby (India) Saurav Ghosal	(Egypt) Karim Darwish (Spain) Borja Golán (Egypt) Tarek Momen (Egypt) Omar Mosaad	(Germany) Simon Rösner (Australia) Cameron Pilley (Colombia) Miguel Á. Rodríguez (Finland) Henrik Mustonen

=== World Series ===
Prize money: $115,000 and more

Tournament	Date	Champion	Runner-Up	Semifinalists	Quarterfinalists
Tournament of Champions 2013 (United States) New York City, United States; World Series Gold $115,000 - Draw	18–24 January 2013	(Egypt) Ramy Ashour; 7-11, 6–11, 12–10, 11–3, 11–1	(France) Grégory Gaultier	(England) James Willstrop (England) Nick Matthew	(Egypt) Mohamed El Shorbagy (Egypt) Karim Darwish (Egypt) Omar Mosaad (South Africa) Stephen Coppinger
North American Open 2013 (United States) Richmond, Virginia, United States; World Series Gold $115,000 - Draw	25 February - 2 March 2013	(Egypt) Ramy Ashour; 11-7, 11–8, 5–11, 11–7	(England) Nick Matthew	(England) James Willstrop (France) Grégory Gaultier	(Egypt) Karim Darwish (England) Peter Barker (Egypt) Amr Shabana (Germany) Simon Rösner
Kuwait PSA Cup 2013; Kuwait City, Kuwait; World Series Platinum $190,000 - Draw	8–14 March 2013	(Egypt) Ramy Ashour; 6-11, 11–8, 11–3, 11–3	(England) James Willstrop	(France) Grégory Gaultier (Egypt) Mohamed El Shorbagy	(Egypt) Karim Darwish (Egypt) Amr Shabana (England) Peter Barker (England) Daryl Selby
British Open 2013 (England) Hull, England; World Series Platinum $150,000 - Draw	20–26 May 2013	(Egypt) Ramy Ashour; 7-11, 11–4, 11–7, 11–8	(France) Grégory Gaultier	(England) Nick Matthew (England) James Willstrop	(Egypt) Karim Darwish (Spain) Borja Golán (Egypt) Tarek Momen (Australia) Cameron Pilley
US Open 2013 (United States) Philadelphia, United States; World Series Gold $115,000 - Draw	11–18 October 2013	(France) Grégory Gaultier; 11-4, 11–5, 11–5	(England) Nick Matthew	(England) James Willstrop (Egypt) Karim Darwish	(Egypt) Mohamed El Shorbagy (England) Peter Barker (Germany) Simon Rösner (France) Mathieu Castagnet
Qatar Classic 2013; Doha, Qatar; World Series Platinum $150,000 - Draw	10–15 November 2013	(Egypt) Mohamed El Shorbagy; 11-5, 5–11, 11–6, 6–11, 11–4	(England) Nick Matthew	(Egypt) Karim Darwish (Spain) Borja Golán	(France) Grégory Gaultier (Egypt) Amr Shabana (England) Daryl Selby (Egypt) Karim Abdel Gawad
Hong Kong Open 2013; Hong Kong, China; World Series Platinum $150,000 - Draw	3–8 December 2013	(England) Nick Matthew; 11-1, 11–8, 5–11, 11–5	(Spain) Borja Golán	(France) Grégory Gaultier (England) James Willstrop	(Egypt) Ramy Ashour (Egypt) Mohamed El Shorbagy (Egypt) Amr Shabana (Egypt) Tarek Momen

Tournament	Date	Champion	Runner-Up	Semifinalists	Round Robin
PSA World Series Finals 2013 (United States) Richmond, Virginia, United States; PSA World Series Finals $110,000 - Draw	15-19 March 2014	(Egypt) Ramy Ashour; 15-17, 11–7, 11–4, 11–5	(Egypt) Mohamed El Shorbagy	(England) Nick Matthew (France) Grégory Gaultier	(England) James Willstrop (Spain) Borja Golán (Egypt) Tarek Momen (Germany) Simon Rösner

=== International ===
Prize money: between $25,000 and $114,999

==== January ====
Tournament	Date	Champion	Runner-Up	Semifinalists	Quarterfinalists
Motor City Open 2013 (United States) Detroit, United States; International 70 $70,000 - Draw	26–29 January 2013	(Egypt) Amr Shabana; 11-4, 2-6 rtd	(Egypt) Karim Darwish	(Egypt) Mohamed El Shorbagy (Egypt) Omar Mosaad	(India) Saurav Ghosal (Malaysia) Ong Beng Hee (South Africa) Stephen Coppinger (Colombia) Miguel Á. Rodríguez

==== February ====
Tournament	Date	Champion	Runner-Up	Semifinalists	Quarterfinalists
Swedish Open 2013 (Sweden) Linköping, Sweden; International 70 $70,000 - Draw	31 January - 3 February 2013	(France) Grégory Gaultier; 11-3, 12–10, 11–9	(England) Nick Matthew	(England) Peter Barker (Egypt) Tarek Momen	(England) Tom Richards (Germany) Simon Rösner (Australia) Cameron Pilley (Egypt) Karim Abdel Gawad
Metro Squash Windy City Open 2013 (United States) Chicago, United States; International 25 $26,250	31 January - 3 February 2013	(Spain) Borja Golán; 5-11, 11–8, 11–6, 11–6	(South Africa) Stephen Coppinger	(Scotland) Alan Clyne (Egypt) Andrew Wagih Shoukry	(Hong Kong) Max Lee (Egypt) Karim Ali Fathi (Mexico) Cesar Salazar (Australia) Matthew Karwalski

==== March ====
Tournament	Date	Champion	Runner-Up	Semifinalists	Quarterfinalists
Canary Wharf Squash Classic 2013 (England) London, England; International 50 $50,000 - Draw	18–22 March 2013	(England) James Willstrop; 11-8, 5–11, 11–4, 11–4	(England) Peter Barker	(England) Nick Matthew (Egypt) Mohamed El Shorbagy	(England) Tom Richards (England) Daryl Selby (South Africa) Stephen Coppinger (Finland) Henrik Mustonen
CIMB Kuala Lumpur Open 2013 (Malaysia) Kuala Lumpur, Malaysia; International 50 $50,000 - Draw	28–31 March 2013	(Egypt) Karim Darwish; 11-9, 12–10, 11–7	(Egypt) Mohamed El Shorbagy	(Spain) Borja Golán (Switzerland) Nicolas Müller	(Egypt) Tarek Momen (Malaysia) Ong Beng Hee (Finland) Olli Tuominen (Egypt) Karim Abdel Gawad

==== April ====
Tournament	Date	Champion	Runner-Up	Semifinalists	Quarterfinalists
Grasshopper Cup 2013 (Switzerland) Zürich, Switzerland; International 35 $35,000	24–27 April 2013	(Botswana) Alister Walker; 11-4, 5–11, 12–10, 9–11, 11–2	(England) Daryl Selby	(Spain) Borja Golán (Netherlands) Laurens Jan Anjema	(Switzerland) Nicolas Müller (France) Grégoire Marche (Egypt) Andrew Wagih Shoukry (England) Eddie Charlton

==== May ====
Tournament	Date	Champion	Runner-Up	Semifinalists	Quarterfinalists
Torneo Internacional PSA Sporta 2013; Guatemala City, Guatemala; International 25 $25,000	9–12 May 2013	(Colombia) Miguel Ángel Rodríguez; 11-5, 9–11, 11–8, 11–0	(South Africa) Stephen Coppinger	(Netherlands) Laurens Jan Anjema (Mexico) César Salazar	(New Zealand) Campbell Grayson (United States) Christopher Gordon (England) Eddie Charlton (Mexico) Erik Tepos Valtierra
Hong Kong FC International 2013; Hong Kong, China; International 25 $25,000	29 May - 1 June 2013	(Botswana) Alister Walker; 11-8, 11–6, 11–7	(Netherlands) Laurens Jan Anjema	(Malaysia) Mohd Nafiizwan Adnan (Egypt) Mohamed Abouelghar	(Finland) Olli Tuominen (Egypt) Karim Abdel Gawad (Hong Kong) Max Lee (United States) Julian Illingworth

==== August ====
Tournament	Date	Champion	Runner-Up	Semifinalists	Quarterfinalists
Colombian Open 2013 (Colombia) Bogotá, Colombia; International 50 $50,000 - Draw	8–11 August 2013	(England) Peter Barker; 11-4, 11–4, 8–11, 11–3	(Egypt) Omar Mosaad	(Australia) Cameron Pilley (Colombia) Miguel Ángel Rodríguez	(Australia) Ryan Cuskelly (France) Mathieu Castagnet (Scotland) Alan Clyne (Mexico) Alfredo Ávila

==== September ====
Tournament	Date	Champion	Runner-Up	Semifinalists	Quarterfinalists
Malaysian Open 2013 (Malaysia) Kuala Lumpur, Malaysia; International 50 $50,000 - Draw	11–15 September 2013	(England) Peter Barker; 11-5, 9–11, 11–5, 11–3	(Egypt) Tarek Momen	(Spain) Borja Golán (England) Chris Simpson	(India) Saurav Ghosal (Egypt) Karim Abdel Gawad (Malaysia) Mohd Nafiizwan Adnan (Egypt) Mazen Hesham
Abierto Mexicano de Raquetas 2013 (Mexico) Toluca, Mexico; International 70 $70,000 - Draw	19–22 September 2013	(France) Grégory Gaultier; 7-11, 11–8, 3–11, 11–6, 11–6	(Egypt) Mohamed El Shorbagy	(Spain) Borja Golán (Colombia) Miguel Ángel Rodríguez	(Egypt) Omar Mosaad (Egypt) Marwan El Shorbagy (France) Grégoire Marche (Mexico) Alfredo Ávila
Netsuite Open 2013 (United States) San Francisco, United States; International 70 $70,000 - Draw	27 September – 1 October 2013	(Egypt) Ramy Ashour; 11-4, 7–11, 7–11, 11–3, 11–3	(France) Grégory Gaultier	(England) James Willstrop (England) Daryl Selby	(England) Peter Barker (Germany) Simon Rösner (England) Tom Richards (Netherlands) Laurens Jan Anjema

==== October ====
Tournament	Date	Champion	Runner-Up	Semifinalists	Quarterfinalists
Montréal Open 2013 (Canada) Montreal, Canada; International 35 $35,000	3–6 October 2013	(Spain) Borja Golán; 9-11, 11–3, 11–2, 12–14, 11–5	(England) Daryl Selby	(India) Saurav Ghosal (England) Adrian Waller	(England) Chris Simpson (France) Mathieu Castagnet (Scotland) Alan Clyne (Egypt) Omar Abdel Aziz
Indian Summer Benefit. Beyond Walls 2013 (United States) St. Paul, United States; International 25 $25,000	5–7 October 2013	(Netherlands) Laurens Jan Anjema; 11-4, 9–11, 11–9, 11–6	(Botswana) Alister Walker	(England) Tom Richards (Switzerland) Nicolas Müller	(United States) Christopher Gordon (South Africa) Shaun Le Roux (Malaysia) Muhd Asyraf Azan (England) Eddie Charlton
Macau Open 2013; Macau, China; International 50 $50,000 - Draw	17–20 October 2013	(Egypt) Omar Mosaad; 11-8, 4–11, 9–11, 11–9, 11–8	(England) Adrian Grant	(India) Saurav Ghosal (Egypt) Omar Abdel Meguid	(South Africa) Stephen Coppinger (Malaysia) Ong Beng Hee (Hong Kong) Max Lee (Hong Kong) Leo Au
Bluenose Classic 2013 (Canada) Halifax, Canada; International 35 $35,000	17–20 October 2013	(Colombia) Miguel Ángel Rodríguez; 4-11, 11–2, 11–2, 11–6	(England) Daryl Selby	(Botswana) Alister Walker (Netherlands) Laurens Jan Anjema	(New Zealand) Campbell Grayson (New Zealand) Martin Knight (England) Eddie Charlton (Mexico) Eric Gálvez

==== November ====
Tournament	Date	Champion	Runner-Up	Semifinalists	Quarterfinalists
Sky Open 2013 (Egypt) Cairo, Egypt; International 50 $50,000 - Draw	19–23 November 2013	(Egypt) Mohamed El Shorbagy; 11-2, 11–7, 11–8	(Egypt) Karim Darwish	(Egypt) Marwan El Shorbagy (Egypt) Omar Abdel Meguid	(Botswana) Alister Walker (Egypt) Mazen Hesham (Egypt) Zahed Mohamed (Egypt) Fares Dessouky

==== December ====
Tournament	Date	Champion	Runner-Up	Semifinalists	Quarterfinalists
Coronation London Open 2013 (England) London, England; International 25 $25,000	12–15 December 2013	(England) Adrian Grant; 7-11, 11–9, 11–4, 11–6	(England) Chris Simpson	(South Africa) Stephen Coppinger (Egypt) Fares Dessouky	(United States) Christopher Gordon (Australia) Rex Hedrick (France) Lucas Serme (Egypt) Zahed Mohamed
Alwatan and Asnan International 2013 (Kuwait) South Surra, Kuwait; International 50 $50,000 - Draw	19–22 December 2013	(Germany) Simon Rösner; 11-4, 11–5, 12–10	(Spain) Borja Golán	(Netherlands) Laurens Jan Anjema (Kuwait) Abdullah Al Muzayen	(Egypt) Tarek Momen (Botswana) Alister Walker (Australia) Ryan Cuskelly (Hong Kong) Max Lee

== Year end world top 10 players ==
Rank	2013	
1	(Egypt) Ramy Ashour	1675.000
2	(France) Grégory Gaultier	1262.500
3	(England) Nick Matthew	1252.000
4	(Egypt) Mohamed El Shorbagy	1030.500
5	(England) James Willstrop	991.000
6	(Egypt) Karim Darwish	763.000
7	(Spain) Borja Golán	572.500
8	(England) Peter Barker	560.000
9	(Egypt) Amr Shabana	532.500
10	(England) Daryl Selby	484.500

== Retirements ==
Following is a list of notable players (winners of a main tour title, and/or part of the PSA World Rankings top 30 for at least one month) who announced their retirement from professional squash, became inactive, or were permanently banned from playing, during the 2013 season:

- Wael El Hindi (born 25 June 1980 in Giza, Egypt) joined the pro tour in 1999, reached the singles no. 8 spot in 2008. He won 8 PSA World Tour titles including the US Open in 2010 and the prestigious Petrosport Open, a World Series Platinum event in Egypt, in 2008. He retired in January after competing a last time in the Tournament of Champions in New York.

== See also ==
- Professional Squash Association (PSA)
- PSA World Series 2013
- PSA World Rankings
- PSA World Series Finals
- PSA World Open
- WSA World Tour 2013
- 2013 Men's World Team Squash Championships
