= 2014 Men's World Open Squash Championship =

Men's World Championship 2014
- 36th PSA World Squash Championship
- Location: Doha, Qatar
- Venue: Aspire Academy
- Date: November 14–21, 2014
- Website www.worldsquashchamps.com

PSA World Tour
- Category: PSA World Championship
- Prize money: $325,000

Results
- Champion: (Egypt) Ramy Ashour
- Runner-up: (Egypt) Mohamed El Shorbagy
- Semi-finalists: (France) Grégory Gaultier (England) Nick Matthew

The 2014 PSA Men's World Squash Championship is the men's edition of the 2014 World Championship, which serves as the individual world championship for squash players. The event took place in Doha in Qatar from 14 to 21 November 2014. Ramy Ashour won his third World Championship title, defeating Mohamed El Shorbagy in the final.

== Prize money and ranking points ==
For 2014, the prize purse was $325,000. The prize money and points breakdown is as follows:

Prize Money World Championship (2014)
Event	W	F	SF	QF	3R	2R	1R
Points (PSA)	2890	1900	1155	700	410	205	125
Prize money	$45,600	$28,500	$17,100	$9,975	$5,700	$2,850	$1,425

== Seeds ==
1. (France) Grégory Gaultier (semifinals)
2. (Egypt) Mohamed El Shorbagy (final)
3. (England) Nick Matthew (semifinals)
4. (Egypt) Ramy Ashour (champion)
5. (Egypt) Amr Shabana (quarterfinals)
6. (Spain) Borja Golán (quarterfinals)
7. (England) Peter Barker (second round)
8. (England) Daryl Selby (first round)
9. (Egypt) Omar Mosaad (third round)
10. (Egypt) Tarek Momen (third round)
11. (Germany) Simon Rösner (third round)
12. (Colombia) Miguel Ángel Rodríguez (third round)
13. (Egypt) Marwan El Shorbagy (second round)
14. (India) Saurav Ghosal (third round)
15. (Egypt) Karim Abdel Gawad (second round)
16. (France) Mathieu Castagnet (second round)

== Draw and results ==
=== Finals ===
1* Quarter finals 2*
1	(France) Grégory Gaultier	11	11	11
(Australia) Cameron Pilley	3	4	5
6	(Spain) Borja Golán	11	11	6	7	6
4	(Egypt) Ramy Ashour	9	7	11	11	11
3	(England) Nick Matthew	11	13	11
5	(Egypt) Amr Shabana	3	11	7
(South Africa) Stephen Coppinger	8	9	7
2	(Egypt) Mohamed El Shorbagy	11	11	11

Semi finals *
1	(France) Grégory Gaultier	15	7	5
4	(Egypt) Ramy Ashour	17	11	11
3	(England) Nick Matthew	9	5	8
2	(Egypt) Mohamed El Shorbagy	11	11	11

Final
4	(Egypt) Ramy Ashour *	13	7	5	11	14
2	(Egypt) Mohamed El Shorbagy	11	11	11	5	12

=== Top half ===
==== Section 1 ====
1* First round 2*
1	(France) Grégory Gaultier	6	9	11	11	11
Q	(Egypt) Andrew Wagih Shoukry	11	11	6	7	3
(Egypt) Mazen Hesham	11	7	11	5
(Malaysia) Mohd Nafi. Adnan	13	11	9	11
(Egypt) Mohamed Abouelghar	8	11	8	11	7
(Egypt) Karim Ali Fathi	11	1	11	5	11
WC	(Qatar) Abdulla Al-Tamimi	8	8	12	5
9	(Egypt) Omar Mosaad	11	11	10	11
16	(France) Mathieu Castagnet	11	11	11
Q	(Australia) Rex Hedrick	3	2	8
Q	(Pakistan) Aamir Atlas Khan	12	7	4	6
(Botswana) Alister Walker	10	11	11	11
(Australia) Cameron Pilley	11	7	11	6	11
(England) Joe Lee	6	11	7	11	9
(England) Chris Simpson	8	11	7	5
7	(England) Peter Barker	11	6	11	11

1* Second round 2*
1	(France) Grégory Gaultier	11	11	11
(Malaysia) Mohd Nafiizwan Adnan	4	7	3
(Egypt) Karim Ali Fathi	4	2	7
9	(Egypt) Omar Mosaad	11	11	11
16	(France) Mathieu Castagnet	6	5	11	11	4
(Botswana) Alister Walker	11	11	8	9	11
(Australia) Cameron Pilley	12	11	9	6	11
7	(England) Peter Barker	10	6	11	11	5

1* Third round 2*
1	(France) Grégory Gaultier	10	11	11	11
9	(Egypt) Omar Mosaad	12	5	9	9
(Botswana) Alister Walker	7	6	10
(Australia) Cameron Pilley	11	11	12

Quarter finals
1	(France) Grégory Gaultier	11	11	11
(Australia) Cameron Pilley	3	4	5

==== Section 2 ====
First round *
6	(Spain) Borja Golán	11	11	11
(Hong Kong) Leo Au	5	8	9
Q	(Scotland) Greg Lobban	11	11	11
(Finland) Henrik Mustonen	4	4	4
(Egypt) Fares Dessouky	11	11	6	11
Q	(Pakistan) Farhan Zaman	8	0	11	9
(Finland) Olli Tuominen	7	rtd
13	(Egypt) Marwan El Shorbagy	11
12	(Colombia) Miguel Á. Rodríguez	11	11	11
(South Africa) Shaun Le Roux	4	6	6
Q	(England) Ben Coleman	8	8	9
(Egypt) Zahed Mohamed	11	11	11
(England) Adrian Grant	9	11	11	11
Q	(Netherlands) Piëdro Schweertman	11	4	2	7
Q	(Malaysia) Ivan Yuen	5	12	5
4	(Egypt) Ramy Ashour	11	14	11

Second round
6	(Spain) Borja Golán	8	11	11	11
Q	(Scotland) Greg Lobban	11	2	4	2
(Egypt) Fares Dessouky	11	11	11
13	(Egypt) Marwan El Shorbagy	9	2	9
12	(Colombia) Miguel Á. Rodríguez	11	12	11
(Egypt) Zahed Mohamed	2	10	7
(England) Adrian Grant	6	5	9
4	(Egypt) Ramy Ashour	11	11	11

Third round
6	(Spain) Borja Golán	11	11	6	11
(Egypt) Fares Dessouky	8	4	11	5
12	(Colombia) Miguel Ángel Rodríguez	11	6	5	4
4	(Egypt) Ramy Ashour	9	11	11	11

Quarter finals
6	(Spain) Borja Golán	11	11	6	7	6
4	(Egypt) Ramy Ashour	9	7	11	11	11

=== Bottom half ===
==== Section 1 ====
1* First round 2*
3	(England) Nick Matthew	11	11	10	11
Q	(Germany) Raphael Kandra	2	6	12	1
(France) Grégoire Marche	15	5	12	9	11
(Scotland) Alan Clyne	13	11	10	11	5
(Pakistan) Nasir Iqbal	13	11	11
Q	(England) Charles Sharpes	11	5	8
(Australia) Steven Finitsis	5	4	6
14	(India) Saurav Ghosal	11	11	11
15	(Egypt) Karim Abdel Gawad	11	11	11
(Kuwait) Abdullah Al-Muzayen	5	9	3
Q	(Pakistan) Farhan Mehboob	7	12	13	7	3
(Hong Kong) Max Lee	11	10	11	11	11
(Switzerland) Nicolas Müller	11	11	11
(Australia) Ryan Cuskelly	9	7	5
(England) Adrian Waller	9	8	11	2
5	(Egypt) Amr Shabana	11	11	7	11

1* Second round 2*
3	(England) Nick Matthew	11	11	11
(France) Grégoire Marche	6	3	4
(Pakistan) Nasir Iqbal	7	11	9	4
14	(India) Saurav Ghosal	11	5	11	11
15	(Egypt) Karim Abdel Gawad	11	11	7	11	8
(Hong Kong) Max Lee	13	3	11	6	11
(Switzerland) Nicolas Müller	7	18	11	4
5	(Egypt) Amr Shabana	11	20	8	11

Third round
3	(England) Nick Matthew	11	11	6	11
14	(India) Saurav Ghosal	4	5	11	9
(Hong Kong) Max Lee	6	7	4
5	(Egypt) Amr Shabana	11	11	11

Quarter finals
3	(England) Nick Matthew	11	13	11
5	(Egypt) Amr Shabana	3	11	7

==== Section 2 ====
First round *
8	(England) Daryl Selby	5	4	11	11	4
(South Africa) Stephen Coppinger	11	11	8	3	11
Q	(Wales) Peter Creed	9	4	8
(Malaysia) Ong Beng Hee	11	11	11
(England) Eddie Charlton	2	6	5
(England) Tom Richards	11	11	11
(Egypt) Omar Abdel Aziz	8	5	8
10	(Egypt) Tarek Momen	11	11	11
11	(Germany) Simon Rösner	11	11	11
Q	(Pakistan) Danish Atlas Khan	6	4	9
Q	(France) Lucas Serme	11	11	11
(New Zealand) Campbell Grayson	4	3	9
(India) Mahesh Mangaonkar	11	11	11	11
Q	(New Zealand) Lance Beddoes	9	3	13	9
Q	(Malaysia) Muhd Asyraf Azan	5	4	8
2	(Egypt) Mohd El Shorbagy	11	11	11

Second round
(South Africa) Stephen Coppinger	11	11	11
(Malaysia) Ong Beng Hee	5	6	6
(England) Tom Richards	11	6	6	7
10	(Egypt) Tarek Momen	9	11	11	11
11	(Germany) Simon Rösner	6	11	11	11
Q	(France) Lucas Serme	11	6	6	9
(India) Mahesh Mangaonkar	6	4	1
2	(Egypt) Mohd El Shorbagy	11	11	11

Third round
(South Africa) Stephen Coppinger	12	9	14	8	11
10	(Egypt) Tarek Momen	10	11	12	11	8
11	(Germany) Simon Rösner	8	11	9	9
2	(Egypt) Mohd El Shorbagy	11	9	11	11

Quarter finals
(South Africa) Stephen Coppinger	8	9	7
2	(Egypt) Mohd El Shorbagy	11	11	11

== See also ==
- World Championship
- 2014 Women's World Open Squash Championship

Preceded by England (Manchester); 2013	PSA World Championship; Qatar (Doha); 2014	Succeeded by United States (Bellevue); 2015
Preceded by US Open; United States (Philadelphia); 2014	PSA World Series 2014; World Championship; Qatar (Doha); 2014	Succeeded by Tournament of Champions; United States (New York); 2015
