= 2015 Men's World Open Squash Championship =

Men's World Championship 2015
- 37th PSA Men's World Squash Championship
- Location: Bellevue, Washington, United States
- Venue: Meydenbauer Center
- Date: November 15–22, 2015
- Website www.worldsquashchamps2015.com
- Category: PSA World Championship
- Prize money: $325,000

Results
- Champion: (France) Grégory Gaultier
- Runner-up: (Egypt) Omar Mosaad
- Semi-finalists: (England) James Willstrop (Egypt) Tarek Momen

The 2015 PSA Men's World Squash Championship is the men's edition of the 2015 World Championship, which serves as the individual world championship for squash players. The event took place in Bellevue, Washington in the United States from 15 to 22 November 2015. Grégory Gaultier won his first World Championship title, defeating Omar Mosaad in the final.

== Prize money and ranking points ==
For 2015, the prize purse was $325,000. The prize money and points breakdown is as follows:

Prize Money World Championship (2015)
Event	W	F	SF	QF	3R	2R	1R
Points (PSA)	2890	1900	1155	700	410	205	125
Prize money	$48,000	$30,000	$18,000	$10,500	$6,000	$3,000	$1,500

== Seeds ==
1. (Egypt) Mohamed El Shorbagy (third round)
2. (England) Nick Matthew (quarterfinals)
3. (France) Grégory Gaultier (champion)
4. (Egypt) Ramy Ashour (quarterfinals)
5. (Colombia) Miguel Ángel Rodríguez (quarterfinals)
6. (Germany) Simon Rösner (third round)
7. (Egypt) Omar Mosaad (final)
8. (Egypt) Tarek Momen (semifinals)
9. (France) Mathieu Castagnet (third round)
10. (Egypt) Marwan El Shorbagy (third round)
11. (England) Peter Barker (first round)
12. (Egypt) Karim Abdel Gawad (third round)
13. (Hong Kong) Max Lee (second round)
14. (Spain) Borja Golán (third round)
15. (Kenya) Stephen Coppinger (second round)
16. (India) Saurav Ghosal (second round)

== Draw and results ==
=== Finals ===
Quarter finals
(England) James Willstrop *	11	11	11
5	(Colombia) Miguel Ángel Rodríguez	5	7	4
(Egypt) Ali Farag	11	8	12	1	3
3	(France) Grégory Gaultier *	5	11	10	11	11
4	(Egypt) Ramy Ashour	8	7	11	11	5
7	(Egypt) Omar Mosaad *	11	11	1	1	11
8	(Egypt) Tarek Momen *	5	11	9	11	11
2	(England) Nick Matthew	11	7	11	8	7

Semi finals
(England) James Willstrop	1	8	8
3	(France) Grégory Gaultier *	11	11	11
7	(Egypt) Omar Mosaad *	11	11	11
8	(Egypt) Tarek Momen	4	4	8

Final
3	(France) Grégory Gaultier *	11	11	12
7	(Egypt) Omar Mosaad	6	7	10

=== Top half ===
==== Section 1 ====
First round
1	(Egypt) Mohd El Shorbagy *	11	11	11
(Mexico) Alfredo Ávila	4	9	7
Q	(Netherlands) Laurens Jan Anjema	10	11	8	10
(England) Tom Richards	12	3	11	12
(England) James Willstrop	11	11	11
Q	(England) Ben Coleman	9	3	6
(Australia) Ryan Cuskelly	11	8	7	3
16	(India) Saurav Ghosal *	7	11	11	11
9	(France) Mathieu Castagnet *	11	11	11
Q	(Wales) Peter Creed	3	5	3
Q	(United States) Todd Harrity	11	2	11	6	11
(Scotland) Alan Clyne	8	11	6	11	3
(New Zealand) Campbell Grayson	11	11	11
Q	(Spain) Carlos Cornes Ribadas	3	6	8
WC	(United States) Julian Illingworth	7	4	5
5	(Colombia) Miguel Á. Rodríguez *	11	11	11

Second round
1	(Egypt) Mohd El Shorbagy *	11	11	11
(England) Tom Richards	8	5	2
(England) James Willstrop *	11	11	11
16	(India) Saurav Ghosal	7	7	7
9	(France) Mathieu Castagnet *	11	11	11
Q	(United States) Todd Harrity	5	4	7
(New Zealand) Campbell Grayson	18	4	5	6
5	(Colombia) Miguel Á. Rodríguez *	16	11	11	11

Third round
1	(Egypt) Mohamed El Shorbagy	4	7	12	7
(England) James Willstrop *	11	11	10	11
9	(France) Mathieu Castagnet	11	9	7	2
5	(Colombia) Miguel Á. Rodríguez *	7	11	11	11

Quarter finals
(England) James Willstrop *	11	11	11
5	(Colombia) Miguel Ángel Rodríguez	5	7	4

==== Section 2 ====
First round
6	(Germany) Simon Rösner *	11	11	11
Q	(Hong Kong) Tsz Fung Yip	8	8	5
Q	(India) Harinder Pal Sandhu	5	11	4	9
(Switzerland) Nicolas Müller	11	2	11	11
(Egypt) Ali Farag	11	11	11
Q	(Denmark) Kristian Frost Olesen	6	6	3
(Scotland) Greg Lobban	7	8	5
13	(Hong Kong) Max Lee *	11	11	11
11	(England) Peter Barker	11	7	4	10
(Egypt) Karim Ali Fathi *	9	11	11	12
(Pakistan) Nasir Iqbal	7	4	7
(Egypt) Fares Dessouky	11	11	11
(Egypt) Omar Abdel Meguid	11	13	11
(Finland) Olli Tuominen	3	11	8
(France) Lucas Serme	9	7	4
3	(France) Grégory Gaultier *	11	11	11

Second round
6	(Germany) Simon Rösner *	11	8	11	11
(Switzerland) Nicolas Müller	6	11	6	7
(Egypt) Ali Farag *	11	11	11
13	(Hong Kong) Max Lee	8	7	7
(Egypt) Karim Ali Fathi *	7	11	9	11	11
(Egypt) Fares Dessouky	11	9	11	3	4
(Egypt) Omar Abdel Meguid	3	4	4
3	(France) Grégory Gaultier *	11	11	11

Third round
6	(Germany) Simon Rösner	11	11	6	9
(Egypt) Ali Farag *	7	13	11	11
(Egypt) Karim Ali Fathi	5	3	3
3	(France) Grégory Gaultier *	11	11	11

Quarter finals
(Egypt) Ali Farag	11	8	12	1	3
3	(France) Grégory Gaultier *	5	11	10	11	11

=== Bottom half ===
==== Section 1 ====
First round
4	(Egypt) Ramy Ashour *	11	11	11
(Egypt) Mazen Hesham	5	9	7
Q	(Canada) Shawn Delierre	6	11	3	7
(Egypt) Mohd Abouelghar	11	5	11	11
(Mexico) César Salazar	13	11	7	4	11
Q	(Egypt) Mohammed Reda	11	6	11	11	8
Q	(Egypt) Andrew Wagih Shoukry	6	4	14
12	(Egypt) Karim Abdel Gawad *	11	11	16
14	(Spain) Borja Golán *	8	11	11	11
(Botswana) Alister Walker	11	9	7	7
(South Africa) Shaun Le Roux	7	12	7	1
(New Zealand) Paul Coll	11	10	11	11
(Malaysia) Mohd Nafi. Adnan	11	11	11
Q	(England) Charles Sharpes	5	8	9
Q	(Pakistan) Farhan Zaman	8	11	1	2
7	(Egypt) Omar Mosaad *	11	7	11	11

Second round
4	(Egypt) Ramy Ashour *	11	11	11
(Egypt) Mohamed Abouelghar	8	9	7
(Mexico) César Salazar	7	3	12
12	(Egypt) Karim Abdel Gawad *	11	11	14
14	(Spain) Borja Golán *	11	13	11
(New Zealand) Paul Coll	9	11	5
(Malaysia) Mohd Nafiizwan Adnan	7	12	11	8	1
7	(Egypt) Omar Mosaad *	11	10	4	11	11

Third round
4	(Egypt) Ramy Ashour *	11	12	8	11
12	(Egypt) Karim Abdel Gawad	6	10	11	7
14	(Spain) Borja Golán	11	4	2	11
7	(Egypt) Omar Mosaad *	6	11	11	13

Quarter finals
4	(Egypt) Ramy Ashour	8	7	11	11	5
7	(Egypt) Omar Mosaad *	11	11	1	1	11

==== Section 2 ====
First round
8	(Egypt) Tarek Momen *	8	9	12	11	11
Q	(England) Joe Lee	11	11	10	9	9
(England) Adrian Grant	7	5	9
(Peru) Diego Elías	11	11	11
(France) Grégoire Marche	11	11	11
Q	(Finland) Henrik Mustonen	5	7	5
(England) Chris Simpson	9	7	4
15	(Kenya) Stephen Coppinger *	11	11	11
10	(Egypt) Marwan El Shorbagy *	12	11	13
(Hong Kong) Leo Au	10	9	11
(England) Daryl Selby	11	11	4	11
(Egypt) Zahed Mohamed	8	6	11	8
(England) Declan James	10	13	11	11	4
Q	(Egypt) Karim El Hammamy	12	15	3	5	11
(Australia) Cameron Pilley	8	6	11	9
2	(England) Nick Matthew *	11	11	8	11

Second round
8	(Egypt) Tarek Momen *	11	11	17
(Peru) Diego Elías	6	1	15
(France) Grégoire Marche *	5	11	11	3	11
15	(Kenya) Stephen Coppinger	11	4	8	11	7
10	(Egypt) Marwan El Shorbagy *	11	11	13
(England) Daryl Selby	7	5	11
Q	(Egypt) Karim El Hammamy	2	8	4
2	(England) Nick Matthew *	11	11	11

Third round
8	(Egypt) Tarek Momen *	7	11	11	11
(France) Grégoire Marche	11	3	3	7
10	(Egypt) Marwan El Shorbagy	11	10	5
2	(England) Nick Matthew *	13	12	11

Quarter finals
8	(Egypt) Tarek Momen *	5	11	9	11	11
2	(England) Nick Matthew	11	7	11	8	7

== See also ==
- World Championship
- 2015 Women's World Open Squash Championship
- 2015 Men's World Team Squash Championships

Preceded by Qatar (Doha); 2014	PSA World Championship; United States (Bellevue); 2015	Succeeded by Egypt (Cairo); 2016
