= Sky Open 2013 =

- 4th Sky Open

Details
- Event name: Banque Misr Sky Open 2013
- Location: Cairo Egypt

Men's Winner
- Category: International 50
- Prize money: $50,000
- Year: World Tour 2013

The Sky Open 2013 is the men's edition of the 2013 Sky Open, which is a tournament of the PSA World Tour event International (prize money: 50 000 $). The event took place in Cairo in Egypt from 19 November to 23 November. Mohamed El Shorbagy won his first Sky Open trophy, beating Karim Darwish in the final.

== Prize money and ranking points ==
For 2013, the prize purse was $50,000. The prize money and points breakdown is as follows:

Prize money Sky Open (2013)
Event	W	F	SF	QF	2R	1R
Points (PSA)	875	575	350	215	125	65
Prize money	$7,440	$4,885	$2,975	$1,805	$1,065	$530

== Seeds ==
1. (Egypt) Karim Darwish (final)
2. (Egypt) Mohamed El Shorbagy (champion)
3. (Egypt) Omar Mosaad (second round)
4. (Botswana) Alister Walker (quarterfinals)
5. (Egypt) Marwan El Shorbagy (semifinals)
6. (Egypt) Omar Abdel Meguid (semifinals)
7. (Egypt) Mazen Hesham Ga Sabry (quarterfinals)
8. (Egypt) Mohd Ali Anwar Reda (second round)

== Draw and results ==
First round
1	(Egypt) Karim Darwish	11	11	11
Q	(Egypt) Youssef Abdalla	3	4	5
(Argentina) Gonzalo Miranda	7	8	2
(Egypt) Mohd Abouelghar	11	11	11
(Germany) Jens Schoor	7	7	9
(Egypt) Zahed Mohamed	11	11	11
(Denmark) Kristian Frost Olesen	7	11	2	11	10
8	(Egypt) Mo. Ali Anwar Reda	11	5	11	9	12
5	(Egypt) Marwan El Shorbagy	9	12	9	11	11
LL	(Jordan) Ahmad Al-Saraj	11	10	11	6	9
Q	(Pakistan) Adil Maqbool	5	6	4
(South Africa) Shaun Le Roux	11	11	11
(Germany) Raphael Kandra	8	4	5
Q	(Egypt) Fares Dessouky	11	11	11
WC	(Egypt) Karim El Hammamy	5	2	5
3	(Egypt) Omar Mosaad	11	11	11
4	(Botswana) Alister Walker	11	11	11
Q	(Egypt) Mohammed El Tabaa	8	2	5
Q	(Egypt) Shehab Es. Hosny	5	6	11	8
(England) Eddie Charlton	11	11	6	11
(England) Jaymie Haycocks	13	11	11
(Austria) Aqeel Rehman	11	9	7
(Egypt) Andrew Wagih	11	7	11	8	9
6	(Egypt) Omar Abdel Meguid	7	11	9	11	11
7	(Egypt) Mazen Hesham	11	11	11
Q	(Egypt) Ahmed Atef	1	6	9
Q	(Egypt) Ahmed Hosny	6	3	3
(Egypt) Omar Abdel Aziz	11	11	11
(England) Joel Hinds	11	11	3
(England) Nathan Lake	7	7	0
Q	(Egypt) Ahmed Hussein	5	3	3
2	(Egypt) Mohd El Shorbagy	11	11	11

Second round
1	(Egypt) Karim Darwish	11	6	11	11	11
(Egypt) Mohd Abouelghar	13	11	8	7	7
(Egypt) Zahed Mohamed	13	6	11	2	11
8	(Egypt) Mohd Ali Anwar Reda	11	11	7	11	9
5	(Egypt) Marwan El Shorbagy	11	11	11
(South Africa) Shaun Le Roux	6	5	3
Q	(Egypt) Fares Dessouky	11	12	7	6	11
3	(Egypt) Omar Mosaad	9	10	11	11	7
4	(Botswana) Alister Walker	6	11	11	11
(England) Eddie Charlton	11	8	7	2
(England) Jaymie Haycocks	9	10	8
6	(Egypt) Omar Abdel Meguid	11	11	11
7	(Egypt) Mazen Hesham	7	11	11	12
(Egypt) Omar Abdel Aziz	11	6	7	10
(England) Joel Hinds	4	9	7
2	(Egypt) Mohd El Shorbagy	11	11	11

Quarter finals
1	(Egypt) Karim Darwish	11	11	11
(Egypt) Zahed Mohamed	7	3	3
5	(Egypt) Marwan El Shorbagy	11	11	11
Q	(Egypt) Fares Dessouky	6	9	5
4	(Botswana) Alister Walker	7	11	11	5
6	(Egypt) Omar Abdel Meguid	11	13	9	11
7	(Egypt) Mazen Hesham	3	7	11	9
2	(Egypt) Mohd El Shorbagy	11	11	9	11

Semi finals
1	(Egypt) Karim Darwish	9	10	11	11	11
5	(Egypt) Marwan El Shorbagy	11	12	9	9	6
Final
1	(Egypt) Karim Darwish	2	7	8
2	(Egypt) Mohd El Shorbagy	11	11	11
6	(Egypt) Omar Abdel Meguid	6	11	11	1	7
2	(Egypt) Mohd El Shorbagy	11	5	6	11	11

== See also ==
- PSA World Tour 2013
- Sky Open
