= Men's Abierto Mexicano de Raquetas 2013 =

Abierto Mexicano 2013
- 2nd PSA Abierto Mexicano

Details
- Event name: Abierto Mexicano de Raquetas 2013
- Location: Toluca Mexico
- Website www.abiertomexicanoderaquetas.com

Men's Winner
- Category: International 70
- Prize money: $70,000
- Year: World Tour 2013

The Men's Abierto Mexicano de Raquetas 2013 is the men's edition of the 2013 Abierto Mexicano de Raquetas, which is a tournament of the PSA World Tour event International (Prize money: $70,000). The event took place in Toluca in Mexico from 19 to 22 September. Grégory Gaultier won his second Abierto Mexicano de Raquetas trophy, beating Mohamed El Shorbagy in the final.

== Prize money and ranking points ==
For 2013, the prize purse was $70,000. The prize money and points breakdown is as follows:

Prize Money Abierto Mexicano de Raquetas (2013)
Event	W	F	SF	QF	1R
Points (PSA)	1225	805	490	300	175
Prize money	$11,875	$8,125	$5,315	$3,280	$1,875

== Seeds ==
1. (France) Grégory Gaultier (Champion)
2. (Egypt) Mohamed El Shorbagy (Final)
3. (Spain) Borja Golán (Semifinals)
4. (Egypt) Omar Mosaad (Quarterfinals)

== Draw and results ==
First round
1	(France) Grégory Gaultier	11	11	11
Q	(Australia) Matthew Karwalski	5	3	3
(England) Tom Richards	5	2	4
(Egypt) Marwan El Shorbagy	11	11	11
(South Africa) Stephen Coppinger	8	3	7
(Colombia) Miguel Á. Rodríguez	11	11	11
(Switzerland) Nicolas Müller	9	11	8	6
4	(Egypt) Omar Mosaad	11	9	11	11
3	(Spain) Borja Golán	11	11	11
Q	(Egypt) Karim Ali Fathi	5	10	6
Q	(Mexico) Alfredo Ávila	8	11	11	16
(England) Adrian Waller	11	7	7	14
(France) Grégoire Marche	11	11	5	11	11
Q	(Finland) Henrik Mustonen	13	6	11	4	2
WC	(Mexico) Cesar Salazar	5	5	7
2	(Egypt) Mohd El Shorbagy	11	11	11

Quarter finals
1	(France) Grégory Gaultier	11	11	11
(Egypt) Marwan El Shorbagy	8	4	9
(Colombia) Miguel Á. Rodríguez	11	6	11	7	11
4	(Egypt) Omar Mosaad	6	11	7	11	8
3	(Spain) Borja Golán	8	11	11	6	11
Q	(Mexico) Alfredo Ávila	11	6	6	11	6
(France) Grégoire Marche	3	6	8
2	(Egypt) Mohd El Shorbagy	11	11	11

Semi finals
1	(France) Grégory Gaultier	11	11	11
(Colombia) Miguel Á. Rodríguez	5	5	7
3	(Spain) Borja Golán	5	5	7
2	(Egypt) Mohd El Shorbagy	11	11	11

Final
1	(France) Grégory Gaultier	7	11	3	11	11
2	(Egypt) Mohd El Shorbagy	11	8	11	6	6

== See also ==
- PSA World Tour 2013
- Abierto Mexicano de Raquetas
