= Men's Malaysian Open Squash Championships 2013 =

Malaysian Open 2013

Details
- Event name: Malaysian Open Squash Championships 2013
- Location: Kuala Lumpur Malaysia
- Venue: National Squash Centre; Bukit Jalil
- Website www.squashsite.co.uk/2009/malaysianopen2013.htm

Men's Winner
- Category: International 50
- Prize money: $50,000
- Year: World Tour 2013

The Men's Malaysian Open Squash Championships 2013 is the men's edition of the 2013 Malaysian Open Squash Championships, which is a tournament of the PSA World Tour event International (prize money: $50,000). The event took place in Kuala Lumpur in Malaysia from the 12 September to the 15 September. Peter Barker won his first Malaysian Open trophy, beating Tarek Momen in the final.

== Prize money and ranking points ==
For 2013, the prize purse was $ 50,000. The prize money and points breakdown is as follows:

Prize money Malaysian Open (2013)
Event	W	F	SF	QF	1R
Points (PSA)	875	575	350	215	125
Prize money	$ 8,075	$ 5,525	$ 3,615	$ 2,230	$ 1,275

== Seeds ==
1. (Egypt) Karim Darwish (first round)
2. (England) Peter Barker (champion)
3. (Spain) Borja Golán (semifinals)
4. (Egypt) Tarek Momen (final)

== Draw and results ==
First round
1	(Egypt) Karim Darwish	11	15	4	1	rtd
(England) Chris Simpson	9	17	11	2
Q	(Egypt) Omar Abdel Aziz	5	9	3
(India) Saurav Ghosal	11	11	11
(Finland) Olli Tuominen	11	6	10	6
Q	(Egypt) Mazen Hesham	8	11	12	11
(Australia) Cameron Pilley	9	12	4	2
4	(Egypt) Tarek Momen	11	10	11	11
3	(Spain) Borja Golán	12	11	11
(Egypt) Omar Mosaad	10	2	4
Q	(Kuwait) Abdullah Al Muzayen	4	7	8
(Egypt) Karim Abdel Gawad	11	11	11
(Malaysia) Ong Beng Hee	3	3	9
WC	(Malaysia) Mohd Nafi. Adnan	11	11	11
Q	(Egypt) Omar Abdel Meguid	9	5	4
2	(England) Peter Barker	11	11	11

Quarter finals
(England) Chris Simpson	6	12	11	11
(India) Saurav Ghosal	11	10	9	9
Q	(Egypt) Mazen Hesham	3	9	6
4	(Egypt) Tarek Momen	11	11	11
3	(Spain) Borja Golán	8	11	11	11
(Egypt) Karim Abdel Gawad	11	8	10	5
WC	(Malaysia) Mohd Nafi. Adnan	8	0	11	2
2	(England) Peter Barker	11	11	7	11

Semi finals
(England) Chris Simpson	11	7	11	9	5
4	(Egypt) Tarek Momen *	6	11	9	11	11
3	(Spain) Borja Golán	9	10	2
2	(England) Peter Barker *	11	11	11

Final
4	(Egypt) Tarek Momen	5	11	5	3
2	(England) Peter Barker *	11	9	11	11

== See also ==
- PSA World Tour 2013
- Malaysian Open Squash Championships
- Women's Malaysian Open Squash Championships 2013
