= 2013 Canary Wharf Squash Classic =

Canary Wharf Squash Classic 2013
- 10th Canary Wharf Squash Classic

Details
- Event name: Canary Wharf Squash Classic 2013
- Location: London, England, United Kingdom
- Venue: East Wintergarden
- Website www.cwsquash.com

Men's Winner
- Category: World Tour International 50
- Prize money: $50,000
- Year: World Tour 2013

The Canary Wharf Squash Classic 2013 is the 2013's Canary Wharf Squash Classic, which is a tournament of the PSA World Tour event International (Prize money: $50,000). The event took place at the East Wintergarden in London in England from 18 March to 22 March.

== Prize money and ranking points ==
For 2013, the prize purse was $50,000. The prize money and points breakdown is as follows:

Prize Money Canary Wharf Squash Classic (2013)
Event	W	F	SF	QF	1R
Points (PSA)	875	575	350	215	125
Prize money	$8,075	$5,525	$3,615	$2,230	$1,275

== Seeds ==
1. (England) Nick Matthew (Semifinals)
2. (England) James Willstrop (Champion)
3. (Egypt) Mohamed El Shorbagy (Semifinals)
4. (England) Peter Barker (Final)

== Draw and results ==
1* 2* First round 3* 4*
1	(England) Nick Matthew	9	11	11	11
(Colombia) Miguel Á. Rodriguez	11	8	6	9
(Botswana) Alister Walker	10	9	1
(South Africa) Stephen Coppinger	12	11	11
(England) Tom Richards	11	11	11
Q	(Egypt) Mohd Ali Anwar Reda	4	5	8
Q	(Scotland) Alan Clyne	7	3	7
4	(England) Peter Barker	11	11	11
3	(Egypt) Mohd El Shorbagy	11	11	11	11
Q	(England) Adrian Waller	7	13	5	6
(England) Adrian Grant	3	11	5	4
Q	(Finland) Henrik Mustonen	11	2	11	11
(England) Daryl Selby	11	4	7	11	11
(Germany) Simon Rösner	9	11	11	8	5
WC	(England) Charles Sharpes	5	11	4	2
2	(England) James Willstrop	11	9	11	11

* Quarter finals *
1	(England) Nick Matthew	11	11	10	11
(South Africa) Stephen Coppinger	6	4	12	3
(England) Tom Richards	11	4	5	7
4	(England) Peter Barker	8	11	11	11
3	(Egypt) Mohd El Shorbagy	3	11	7	11	11
Q	(Finland) Henrik Mustonen	11	9	11	6	9
(England) Daryl Selby	7	5	7
2	(England) James Willstrop	11	11	11

Semi finals
1	(England) Nick Matthew	11	8	9	7
4	(England) Peter Barker *	6	11	11	11
3	(Egypt) Mohd El Shorbagy	7	9	11	8
2	(England) James Willstrop *	11	11	7	11

Final
4	(England) Peter Barker	8	11	4	4
2	(England) James Willstrop *	11	5	11	11

== See also ==
- PSA World Tour 2013
- Canary Wharf Squash Classic
- 2013 Men's British Open
