= 2019–20 PSA Men's World Squash Championship =

2019–20 Men's World Championship
- 41st PSA Men's World Squash Championship
- Location: Doha, Qatar
- Date: 8–15 November 2019
- Category: PSA World Championships

Results
- Champion: (Egypt) Tarek Momen
- Runner-up: (New Zealand) Paul Coll
- Semi-finalists: (Germany) Simon Rösner (Egypt) Marwan El Shorbagy

The 2019–20 PSA Men's World Squash Championship was the 2019–20 men's edition of the World Squash Championships, which serves as the individual world championship for squash players. The event took place in Doha, Qatar from 8 to 15 November 2019.

== Seeds ==
Click on the seed number of a player to go to their draw section.

1. (Egypt) Mohamed El Shorbagy (quarterfinals)
2. (Egypt) Tarek Momen (champion)
3. (Egypt) Karim Abdel Gawad (third round)
4. (New Zealand) Paul Coll (finalist)
5. (Germany) Simon Rösner (semifinals)
6. (Peru) Diego Elías (quarterfinals)
7. (Egypt) Mohamed Abouelghar (third round)
8. (Colombia) Miguel Rodríguez (third round)

9. (Egypt) Marwan El Shorbagy (semifinals)
10. (India) Saurav Ghosal (third round)
11. (Wales) Joel Makin (third round)
12. (Egypt) Omar Mosaad (third round)
13. (Egypt) Fares Dessouky (third round)
14. (Egypt) Zahed Salem (quarterfinals)
15. (France) Grégoire Marche (first round)
16. (England) Daryl Selby (first round)

== Draw and results ==
=== Finals ===
Semi finals
2	(Egypt) Tarek Momen	9	11	11	11
5	(Germany) Simon Rösner	11	7	6	6
4	(New Zealand) Paul Coll	9	11	8	11	11
9	(Egypt) Marwan El Shorbagy	11	9	11	6	7

Final
2	(Egypt) Tarek Momen	11	11	11
4	(New Zealand) Paul Coll	8	3	4

=== Top half ===
==== Section 1 ====
First round
2	(Egypt) Tarek Momen	12	10	11	11
(Germany) Raphael Kandra	10	12	7	4
(England) Tom Richards	15	8	8
(Egypt) Mazen Hesham	17	11	11
(Canada) Shawn Delierre	7	8	4
(France) Mathieu Castagnet	11	11	11
(Qatar) Abdulla Al-Tamimi	11	11	7	11
15	(France) Grégoire Marche	6	9	11	9
13	(Egypt) Fares Dessouky	11	9	11	11
(Malaysia) Eain Yow	6	11	8	5
(Denmark) Kristian Frost	9	4	6
(Spain) Edmon López	11	11	11
(Hong Kong) Max Lee	6	6	11	8
(Scotland) Greg Lobban	11	11	8	11
(Malaysia) Ivan Yuen	8	9	12
6	(Peru) Diego Elías	11	11	14

Second round
2	(Egypt) Momen	11	12	11
(Egypt) Hesham	9	10	5
(France) Castagnet	10	8	8
(Qatar) Al-Tamimi	12	11	11
13	(Egypt) Dessouky	11	11	11
(Spain) López	5	3	5
(Scotland) Lobban	11	3	4	11	4
6	(Peru) Elías	6	11	11	9	11

Third Round
2	(Egypt) Momen	11	10	9	11	11
(Qatar) Al-Tamimi	5	12	11	9	4
13	(Egypt) Dessouky	12	8	6	4
6	(Peru) Elías	10	11	11	11

Quarter finals
2	(Egypt) Momen	11	13	11
6	(Peru) Elías	6	11	6

==== Section 2 ====
First round
5	(Germany) Simon Rösner	12	4	11	11
(England) Ben Coleman	10	11	2	2
(India) Vikram Malhotra	11	11	5	3	8
(England) Declan James	8	1	11	11	11
(Egypt) Mohamed ElSherbini	11	3
(Egypt) Karim Ali Fathy	4	0^{r}
(England) Richie Fallows	9	2	13
11	(Wales) Joel Makin	11	11	15
16	(England) Daryl Selby	5	12	5	13	9
(Egypt) Youssef Ibrahim	11	10	11	11	11
(England) James Willstrop	11	11	12
(England) George Parker	4	5	10
(Mexico) César Salazar	14	11	11
(England) Nathan Lake	12	6	6
(France) Auguste Dussourd	4	8	11
3	(Egypt) Karim Abdel Gawad	11	11	13

Second round
5	(Germany) Rösner	11	9	11	11
(England) James	9	11	8	9
(Egypt) ElSherbini	3	11	9	12
11	(Wales) Makin	11	6	11	14
(Egypt) Ibrahim	7	8	4
(England) Willstrop	11	11	11
(Mexico) Salazar	12	6	5	7
3	(Egypt) Gawad	10	11	11	11

Third Round
5	(Germany) Rösner	11	11	11
11	(Wales) Makin	8	8	5
(England) Willstrop	11	4	11	12
3	(Egypt) Gawad	8	11	9	10

Quarter finals
5	(Germany) Rösner	14	11	11
(England) Willstrop	12	6	3

=== Bottom half ===
==== Section 3 ====
First round
4	(New Zealand) Paul Coll	11	11	11
WC	(Qatar) Hamad Al-Amri	4	4	3
(Spain) Borja Golán	11	11	11
(India) Ramit Tandon	9	6	3
(Spain) Iker Pajares Bernabeu	11	10	11	0^{r}
WC	(Qatar) Syed Azlan Amjad	8	12	4	2
(France) Baptiste Masotti	11	9	2	8
12	(Egypt) Omar Mosaad	8	11	11	11
14	(Egypt) Zahed Salem	11	3	11	11
(Hong Kong) Yip Tsz Fung	7	11	3	6
(New Zealand) Campbell Grayson	10	5	5
(Egypt) Mostafa Asal	12	11	11
(Scotland) Alan Clyne	12	11	7	11
(Japan) Ryosei Kobayashi	10	5	11	9
(Egypt) Youssef Soliman	6	11	9	8
8	(Colombia) Miguel Rodríguez	11	9	11	11

Second round
4	(New Zealand) Coll	11	11	11
(Spain) Golán	7	4	8
WC	(Qatar) Amjad	5	2	6
12	(Egypt) Mosaad	11	11	11
14	(Egypt) Salem	11	6	11	11
(Egypt) Asal	7	11	2	7
(Scotland) Clyne	8	3	6
8	(Colombia) Rodríguez	11	11	11

Third Round
4	(New Zealand) Coll	9	14	11	6	16
12	(Egypt) Mosaad	11	12	9	11	14
14	(Egypt) Salem	8	11	11	11
8	(Colombia) Rodríguez	11	9	7	9

Quarter finals
4	(New Zealand) Coll	11	11	11
14	(Egypt) Salem	8	9	6

==== Section 4 ====
First round
7	(Egypt) Mohamed Abouelghar	11	11	11
(Pakistan) Tayyab Aslam	5	4	7
(United States) Todd Harrity	14	7	3
(Hong Kong) Leo Au	16	11	11
(Switzerland) Nicolas Müller	11	11	11
(Austria) Aqeel Rehman	6	9	7
(Mexico) Arturo Salazar	4	3	7
9	(Egypt) Marwan El Shorbagy	11	11	11
10	(India) Saurav Ghosal	11	11	18
(India) Mahesh Mangaonkar	7	7	16
(France) Lucas Serme	10	11	11	11
(France) Benjamin Aubert	12	8	3	5
(England) Chris Simpson	13	7	1
(England) Adrian Waller	15	11	11
(France) Victor Crouin	8	6	7
1	(Egypt) Mohamed El Shorbagy	11	11	11

Second round
7	(Egypt) Abouelghar	11	11	8	4	12
(Hong Kong) Au	6	8	11	11	10
(Switzerland) Müller	11	9	8	6
9	(Egypt) Marwan	5	11	11	11
10	(India) Ghosal	11	11	11
(France) Serme	8	5	5
(England) Waller	11	9	9
1	(Egypt) El Shorbagy	13	11	11

Third Round
7	(Egypt) Abouelghar	4	8	4
9	(Egypt) Marwan	11	11	11
10	(India) Ghosal	6	8	12
1	(Egypt) El Shorbagy	11	11	14

Quarter finals
9	(Egypt) Marwan	11	2	11	3	11
1	(Egypt) El Shorbagy	6	11	6	11	8

== See also ==
- World Squash Championships
- 2019–20 PSA Women's World Squash Championship

Preceded by Chicago (USA); 2018–19	PSA World Championships; Doha (Qatar); 2019–20	Succeeded by Chicago (USA); 2020–21
