= Motor City Open 2013 =

- 14th Motor City Open

Details
- Event name: Motor City Open 2013
- Location: Detroit United States
- Venue: Birmingham Athletic Club
- Website themotorcityopen.com

Men's Winner
- Category: World Tour International 70
- Prize money: $70,000
- Year: World Tour 2013

The 2013 Motor City Open is an International 70 tournament of the PSA World Tour. The event took place at the Birmingham Athletic Club in Detroit in the United States from 26 January to 29 January 2013. Amr Shabana won his first Motor City Open title, beating Karim Darwish in the final.

== Prize money and ranking points ==
For 2013, the prize purse was $70,000. The prize money and points breakdown is as follows:

Prize Money Motor City Open (2013)
| Event | W | F | SF | QF | 1R |
| Points (PSA) | 1225 | 805 | 490 | 300 | 175 |
| Prize money | $12,350 | $8,450 | $5,525 | $3,410 | $1,950 |

== Seeds ==
1. (Egypt) Mohamed El Shorbagy (Semifinals)
2. (Egypt) Karim Darwish (Final)
3. (Egypt) Omar Mosaad (Semifinals)
4. (Egypt) Amr Shabana (Champion)

== Draw and results ==
First round
1 | (Egypt) Mohd El Shorbagy | 11 | 11 | 11
Q | (Kuwait) Abdullah Al Muzayen | 9 | 6 | 5
(Malaysia) Ong Beng Hee | 6 | 14 | 11 | 12
Q | (Australia) Ryan Cuskelly | 11 | 12 | 7 | 10
(Colombia) Miguel Á. Rodriguez | 12 | 11 | 11 | 14
Q | (France) Mathieu Castagnet | 14 | 0 | 6 | 12
(Switzerland) Nicolas Müller | 9 | 8 | 7
4 | (Egypt) Amr Shabana | 11 | 11 | 11
3 | (Egypt) Omar Mosaad | 15 | 11 | 11
Q | (Egypt) Marwan El Shorbagy | 13 | 3 | 7
(India) Saurav Ghosal | 6 | 11 | 11 | 11
(Scotland) Alan Clyne | 11 | 7 | 2 | 3
(South Africa) Stephen Coppinger | 11 | 11 | 11
(Egypt) Hisham Ashour | 3 | 7 | 2
(Finland) Olli Tuominen | 3 | 3 | 7
2 | (Egypt) Karim Darwish | 11 | 11 | 11

Quarter finals
1 | (Egypt) Mohd El Shorbagy | 5 | 11 | 11 | 14
(Malaysia) Ong Beng Hee | 11 | 9 | 6 | 12
(Colombia) Miguel Á. Rodriguez | 6 | 7 | 3
4 | (Egypt) Amr Shabana | 11 | 11 | 11
3 | (Egypt) Omar Mosaad | 11 | 11 | 11
(India) Saurav Ghosal | 6 | 8 | 8
(South Africa) Stephen Coppinger | 5 | 4 | 11 | 3
2 | (Egypt) Karim Darwish | 11 | 11 | 6 | 11

Semi finals
1 | (Egypt) Mohd El Shorbagy | 11 | 5 | 11 | 7
4 | (Egypt) Amr Shabana | 13 | 11 | 6 | 11
3 | (Egypt) Omar Mosaad | 12 | 11 | 11 | 6 | 5
2 | (Egypt) Karim Darwish | 14 | 8 | 8 | 11 | 11

Final
4 | (Egypt) Amr Shabana | 11 | 2
2 | (Egypt) Karim Darwish | 4 | 6 | rtd

== See also ==
- PSA World Tour 2013
- Motor City Open (squash)
