= 2023 Men's British Open Squash Championship =

Squash tournament

British Open
- Men's British Open

Details
- Event name: 2023 British Open
- Location: Birmingham, England
- Venue: Edgbaston Priory Club, Birmingham Repertory Theatre
- Dates: 9 April to 16 April 2023

Men's Winner
- Prize money: $179,000
- Year: 2022–23 PSA World Tour

The Men's 2023 British Open was the men's edition of the 2023 British Open Squash Championships, which is a 2022–23 PSA World Tour event. The event took place at the Edgbaston Priory Club, Birmingham Repertory Theatre in Birmingham in England between 9 April and 16 April 2023.

After three consecutive defeats in the three previous finals, Egypt's Ali Farag finally won the title, after defeating Peruvian Diego Elías.

== Draw and results ==
=== Semi-finals and final ===
Semi-finals
2	(Egypt) Farag	11	11	8	11
7	(Egypt) Hesham	4	4	11	2
3	(New Zealand) Coll	4	3	11	1
1	(Peru) Elias	11	11	2	11

Final
2	(Egypt) Farag	13	5	11	11
1	(Peru) Elias	11	11	8	9

=== Main Draw ===
==== Top half ====
First round
1	(Peru) Diego Elías
[Bye]
9/16	(Wales) Joel Makin
[Bye]
(England) Nathan Lake	6	11	11	11
(Egypt) Aly Abou Eleinen	11	4	0	0
(England) Nick Wall	6	11	11	7	11
(France) Auguste Dussourd	11	5	6	11	6
8	(France) Victor Crouin
[Bye]
(Germany) Raphael Kandra	10	11	11	9	11
(England) Simon Herbert	12	4	7	11	6
9/16	(Switzerland) Nicolas Mueller
[Bye]
9/16	(Egypt) Youssef Ibrahim
[Bye]
3	(New Zealand) Paul Coll
[Bye]
(England) Curtis Malik	11	11	11
(Malaysia) Eain Yow Ng	7	9	5
(England) Adrian Waller	15	11	9	11	11
(Egypt) Yahya Elnawasany	16	4	11	5	5
9/16	(India) Saurav Ghosal
[Bye]
(Scotland) Greg Lobban	11	11	8	4	11
(England) George Parker	5	7	11	11	4
9/16	(Egypt) Youssef Soliman
[Bye]
5	(Egypt) Marwan ElShorbagy
[Bye]
(France) Lucas Serme	6	6	10
(Switzerland) Dimitri Steinmann	11	11	12

Second round
1	(Peru) Elías	11	8	11	11
9/16	(Wales) Makin	7	11	5	8
(England) Lake	11	11	11	11
(England) Wall	7	3	13	7
8	(France) Crouin	10	9	11	11	11
(Germany) Kandra	12	11	3	2	2
9/16	(Switzerland) Mueller	9	11	11	11
9/16	(Egypt) Ibrahim	11	9	9	3
3	(New Zealand) Coll	11	11	11
(England) Malik	4	4	3
(England) Waller	7	11	5	5
9/16	(India) Ghosal	11	6	11	11
(Scotland) Lobban	11	6	12	3	5
9/16	(Egypt) Soliman	5	11	10	11	11
5	(Egypt) ElShorbagy	12	14	7	11
(Switzerland) Steinmann	10	12	11	8

Third round
1	(Peru) Elias	11	11	11
(England) Lake	8	8	7
8	(France) Crouin	5	11	11	22
9/16	(Switzerland) Mueller	11	9	6	20
3	(New Zealand) Coll	11	11	11
9/16	(India) Ghosal	6	9	1
9/16	(Egypt) Soliman	8	6	8
5	(Egypt) ElShorbagy	11	11	11

Quarter-finals
1	(Peru) Elias	4	9	11	11	11
8	(France) Crouin	11	11	7	6	9
Semi-finals
1	(Peru) Elias	11	11	2	11
3	(New Zealand) Coll	4	3	11	1
3	(New Zealand) Coll	8	11	11	7	11
5	(Egypt) ElShorbagy	11	8	6	11	1

==== Bottom half ====
First round
2	(Egypt) Ali Farag
[Bye]
(Egypt) Karim El Hammamy	11	11	6	11	11
(Egypt) Omar Mosaad	13	5	11	9	6
(United States) Shahjahan Khan	12	8	7	11	3
(Hong Kong) Tsz Kwan Lau	10	11	11	7	11
(Egypt) Mohamed ElSherbini	11	11	11
(United States) Faraz Khan	6	4	4
(England) Patrick Rooney	11	11	11
(United States) Todd Harrity	5	8	6
(Spain) Iker Pajares Bernabeu	11	12	6	11
(Hong Kong) Henry Leung	7	10	11	7
6	(Egypt) Tarek Momen
[Bye]
(Mexico) Cesar Salazar	11	7
(India) Ramit Tandon	5	0	ret
7	(Egypt) Mazen Hesham
[Bye]
(France) Sebastien Bonmalais	8	5	11	2
(United States) Timothy Brownell	11	11	8	11
(France) Baptiste Masotti	9	11	11	7	11
(England) James Willstrop	11	3	7	11	8
9/16	(France) Gregoire Marche
[Bye]
9/16	(Egypt) Karim Abdel Gawad
[Bye]
9/16	(Colombia) Miguel Rodríguez
[Bye]
(Mexico) Leonel Cardenas	11	11	4	11
(Hungary) Balázs Farkas	7	4	11	6
4	(England) Mohamed El Shorbagy
[Bye]

Second round
2	(Egypt) Farag	11	11	11
(Egypt) El Hammamy	6	1	2
(Hong Kong) Kwan Lau	9	11	7	2
(Egypt) ElSherbini	11	8	11	11
(England) Rooney	10	11	6	11	5
(Spain) Pajares	12	6	11	8	11
4	(Egypt) Momen	11	11	11
(Mexico) Salazar	5	4	8
7	(Egypt) Hesham	11	11	11	11	11
(United States) Brownwell	5	13	13	4	5
9/16	(France) Masotti	11	2	11	11
9/16	(France) Marche	6	11	5	2
9/16	(Egypt) Gawad	7	11	11	7	11
9/16	(Colombia) Rodriguez	11	6	8	11	9
(Mexico) Cardenas	6	9	5
4	(England) El Shorbagy	11	11	11

Third round
2	(Egypt) Farag	11	8	12	11
(Egypt) ElSherbini	4	11	10	4
(Spain) Pajares	7	6	3
6	(Egypt) Momen	11	11	11
7	(Egypt) Hesham	11	5	11	11
(France) Masotti	8	11	4	3
9/16	(Egypt) Gawad	7	11	11	7	11
4	(England) ElShorbagy	11	6	8	11	9

Quarter-finals
2	(Egypt) Farag	11	7	11	11
6	(Egypt) Momen	6	11	8	8
Semi-finals
2	(Egypt) Farag	11	11	8	11
7	(Egypt) Hesham	4	4	11	2
7	(Egypt) Hesham	6	11	14	11
9/16	(Egypt) Gawad	11	9	12	6

== See also ==
- 2023 Women's British Open Squash Championship
