= Men's Macau Open 2013 =

Macau Open 2013
- 8th PSA Macau Open

Details
- Event name: Macau Open 2013
- Location: Macau China

Men's Winner
- Category: International 50
- Prize money: $50,000
- Year: World Tour 2013

The Men's Macau Open 2013 is the men's edition of the 2013 Macau Open (squash), which is a tournament of the PSA World Tour event International (prize money: $50,000). The event took place in Macau in China from 17 October to 20 October. Omar Mosaad won his first Macau Open trophy, beating Adrian Grant in the final.

== Prize money and ranking points ==
For 2013, the prize purse was $50,000. The prize money and points breakdown is as follows:

Prize money Macau Open (2013)
Event	W	F	SF	QF	1R
Points (PSA)	875	575	350	215	125
Prize money	$8,075	$5,525	$3,615	$2,230	$1,275

== Seeds ==
1. (Egypt) Omar Mosaad (champion)
2. (Australia) Cameron Pilley (first round)
3. (South Africa) Stephen Coppinger (quarterfinals)
4. (India) Saurav Ghosal (semifinals)

== Draw and results ==
First round
1	(Egypt) Omar Mosaad	11	11	8	11
(Finland) Olli Tuominen	5	8	11	4
WC	(Macau) Steven Liu	4	3	6
(Malaysia) Ong Beng Hee	11	11	11
(Hong Kong) Max Lee	11	11	11
Q	(Malaysia) Ivan Yuen	7	11	9
Q	(Egypt) Mazen Hesham	4	11	9	11
4	(India) Saurav Ghosal	11	9	11	11
3	(South Africa) Stephen Coppinger	7	14	11	11
(England) Jonathan Kemp	11	12	7	2
Q	(Egypt) Omar Abdel Meguid	11	15	11	11
(England) Tom Richards	5	17	7	4
(Malaysia) Mohd Nafi. Adnan	5	7	14	6
(England) Adrian Grant	11	11	12	11
Q	(Hong Kong) Leo Au	16	8	11	11
2	(Australia) Cameron Pilley	14	11	5	5

Quarter finals
1	(Egypt) Omar Mosaad	11	11	11
(Malaysia) Ong Beng Hee	5	9	5
(Hong Kong) Max Lee	10	8	5
4	(India) Saurav Ghosal	12	11	11
3	(South Africa) Stephen Coppinger	8	5	9
Q	(Egypt) Omar Abdel Meguid	11	11	11
(England) Adrian Grant	11	11	11
Q	(Hong Kong) Leo Au	7	12	4

Semi finals
1	(Egypt) Omar Mosaad	11	11	9	11
4	(India) Saurav Ghosal	8	11	8	7
Q	(Egypt) Omar Abdel Meguid	4	11	2	6
(England) Adrian Grant	11	8	11	11

Final
1	(Egypt) Omar Mosaad	11	4	9	11	11
(England) Adrian Grant	8	11	11	9	8

== See also ==
- PSA World Tour 2013
- Macau Open (squash)
