= Colombian Open (squash) 2013 =

Men's squash tournament in Bogota, Colombia

Colombian Open 2013
- 16th Colombian Open

Details
- Event name: XVI Abierto Colombiano De Squash Club El Nogal 2013
- Location: Bogotá, Colombia
- Venue: Club El Nogal
- Website www.abiertocolombianopsa.com

Men's Winner
- Category: International 50
- Prize money: $50,000
- Year: World Tour 2013

The Colombian Open 2013 was the men's edition of the 2013 Colombian Open, which was a tournament of the PSA World Tour event International (Prize money : 50 000 $). The event took place in Bogotá in Colombia from 8 to 11 August. Peter Barker won his fourth Colombian Open trophy, beating Omar Mosaad in the final.

== Prize money and ranking points ==
For 2013, the prize purse was $50,000. The prize money and points breakdown is as follows:

Prize Money Colombian Open (2013)
Event	W	F	SF	QF	1R
Points (PSA)	875	575	350	215	125
Prize money	$8,550	$5,850	$3,825	$2,360	$1,350

== Seeds ==
1. (England) Peter Barker (champion)
2. (Egypt) Tarek Momen (first round)
3. (Egypt) Omar Mosaad (final)
4. (Australia) Cameron Pilley (semifinals)

== Draw and results ==
First round
1	(England) Peter Barker	11	11	11	11	11
(Egypt) Marwan El Shorbagy	7	5	13	13	9
Q	(Mexico) César Salazar	11	10	4	11	7
(France) Mathieu Castagnet	8	12	11	4	11
(Scotland) Alan Clyne	5	11	11	11
Q	(Hong Kong) Leo Au	11	2	8	8
(Malaysia) Ong Beng Hee	9	9	2
4	(Australia) Cameron Pilley	11	11	11
3	(Egypt) Omar Mosaad	11	11	11
WC	(Colombia) Nicolas Valderrama	3	7	5
Q	(Mexico) Alfredo Ávila	11	7	11	11
(England) Tom Richards	8	11	8	6
(Australia) Ryan Cuskelly	11	2	11	11
Q	(Hong Kong) Max Lee	7	11	8	8
(Colombia) Miguel Á. Rodríguez	11	11	7	11
2	(Egypt) Tarek Momen	6	8	11	5

Quarter finals
1	(England) Peter Barker	11	11	3
(France) Mathieu Castagnet	6	0	0
(Scotland) Alan Clyne	11	4	11	3
4	(Australia) Cameron Pilley	13	11	6	11
3	(Egypt) Omar Mosaad	11	11	3	11
Q	(Mexico) Alfredo Ávila	9	8	11	6
(Australia) Ryan Cuskelly	9	11	5	3
(Colombia) Miguel Á. Rodríguez	11	4	11	11

Semi finals
1	(England) Peter Barker	12	11	11
4	(Australia) Cameron Pilley	10	5	4
3	(Egypt) Omar Mosaad	11	11	11
(Colombia) Miguel Á. Rodríguez	8	7	5

Final
1	(England) Peter Barker	11	11	8	11
3	(Egypt) Omar Mosaad	4	4	11	3

== See also ==
- PSA World Tour 2013
- Colombian Open
