= Netsuite Open 2013 =

- 3rd Netsuite Open

Details
- Event name: Netsuite Open 2013
- Location: San Francisco United States
- Venue: Standford Squash
- Website www.netsuiteopen.com

Men's Winner
- Category: International 70
- Prize money: $70,000
- Year: World Tour 2013

The Netsuite Open 2013 is the 2013's Netsuite Open, which is a tournament of the PSA World Tour event International (Prize money: $70,000). The event took place at the Standford Squash in San Francisco in the United States from 25 September to 1 October. Ramy Ashour won his first Netsuite Open trophy, beating Grégory Gaultier in the final.

== Prize money and ranking points ==
For 2013, the prize purse was $70,000. The prize money and points breakdown is as follows:

Prize Money Netsuite Open (2013)
Event	W	F	SF	QF	1R
Points (PSA)	1225	805	490	300	175
Prize money	$11,875	$8,125	$5,315	$3,280	$1,875

== Seeds ==
1. (Egypt) Ramy Ashour (Champion)
2. (France) Grégory Gaultier (Final)
3. (England) James Willstrop (Semifinals)
4. (England) Peter Barker (Quarterfinals)

== Draw and results ==
First round
1	(Egypt) Ramy Ashour	15	11	11
Q	(Scotland) Alan Clyne	13	3	1
(England) Tom Richards	11	11	11	12
(England) Adrian Grant	9	8	11	10
(Netherlands) Laurens Jan Anjema	11	11	11
Q	(Finland) Henrik Mustonen	7	3	7
(Colombia) Miguel Á. Rodríguez	4	9	11	3
3	(England) James Willstrop	11	11	3	11
4	(England) Peter Barker	11	11	11
WC	(United States) Julian Illingworth	4	6	5
Q	(England) Adrian Waller	6	6	6
(England) Daryl Selby	11	11	11
(Germany) Simon Rösner	14	11	11
(Switzerland) Nicolas Müller	12	4	7
Q	(France) Mathieu Castagnet	7	4	6
2	(France) Grégory Gaultier	11	11	11

1* Quarter finals 2*
1	(Egypt) Ramy Ashour	11	11	11
(England) Tom Richards	8	6	7
(Netherlands) Laurens Jan Anjema	2	1	5
3	(England) James Willstrop	11	11	11
4	(England) Peter Barker	11	10	3	4
(England) Daryl Selby	8	12	11	11
(Germany) Simon Rösner	7	6	5
2	(France) Grégory Gaultier	11	11	11

Semi finals *
1	(Egypt) Ramy Ashour	11	11	2	11
4	(England) James Willstrop	5	9	11	7
(England) Daryl Selby	4	1	3
2	(France) Grégory Gaultier	11	11	11

Final
1	(Egypt) Ramy Ashour *	11	7	7	11	11
2	(France) Grégory Gaultier	4	11	11	3	3

== See also ==
- PSA World Tour 2013
- Netsuite Open
