= Men's Kuala Lumpur Open Squash Championships 2012 =

Kuala Lumpur Open Squash Championships 2012

Details
- Event name: CIMB Kuala Lumpur Nicol David Open Squash Championships 2012
- Location: Kuala Lumpur Malaysia
- Venue: Berjaya Times Square
- Website www.squashsite.co.uk/2009/klopen2012.htm

Men's Winner
- Category: International 50
- Prize money: $50,000
- Year: World Tour 2012

The Men's CIMB Kuala Lumpur Nicol David Open Squash Championships 2012 was the men's edition of the 2012 Kuala Lumpur Open Squash Championships, which was a tournament of the PSA World Tour event International (prize money: $50,000). The event took place in Kuala Lumpur in Malaysia from 26 to 31 March. Omar Mosaad won his first CIMB Kuala Lumpur Open trophy, beating Adrian Grant in the final.

== Prize money and ranking points ==
For 2012, the prize purse was $50,000. The prize money and points breakdown is as follows:

Prize money CIMB Kuala Lumpur Open (2012)
Event	W	F	SF	QF	1R
Points (PSA)	875	575	350	215	125
Prize money	$8,075	$5,525	$3,615	$2,230	$1,275

== Seeds ==
1. (Egypt) Karim Darwish (semifinals)
2. (Malaysia) Mohd Azlan Iskandar (first round)
3. (Egypt) Omar Mosaad (champion)
4. (England) Adrian Grant (final)

== Draw and results ==
First round
1	(Egypt) Karim Darwish	11	11	11
(France) Grégoire Marche	2	5	9
(Australia) Ryan Cuskelly	8	11	11	10	3
Q	(Hong Kong) Leo Au	11	9	8	12	11
(Hong Kong) Max Lee	11	11	11
Q	(England) Adrian Waller	8	5	5
WC	(Malaysia) Ivan Yuen	11	3	8	8
4	(England) Adrian Grant	6	11	11	11
3	(Egypt) Omar Mosaad	8	12	10	11	11
(Egypt) Tarek Momen	11	10	12	1	6
(India) Saurav Ghosal	9	11	11	11
Q	(Kuwait) Abdullah Al Muzayen	11	8	8	6
(Malaysia) Ong Beng Hee	11
Q	(Australia) Matthew Karwalski	8
(Malaysia) Mohd Nafi. Adnan	8	11	7	11	11
2	(Malaysia) Mohd Azlan Iskandar	11	7	11	3	2

Quarter finals
1	(Egypt) Karim Darwish	11	11	11
Q	(Hong Kong) Leo Au	5	3	9
(Hong Kong) Max Lee	11	11	9	4	6
4	(England) Adrian Grant	7	9	11	11	11
3	(Egypt) Omar Mosaad	11	11	4	11
(India) Saurav Ghosal	7	9	11	7
(Malaysia) Ong Beng Hee	12	11	6	11	11
(Malaysia) Mohd Nafi. Adnan	'10	13	11	7	7

Semi finals
1	(Egypt) Karim Darwish	14	8	11	9
4	(England) Adrian Grant	12	11	13	11
3	(Egypt) Omar Mosaad	11	11	8	11
(Malaysia) Ong Beng Hee	6	7	11	7

Final
4	(England) Adrian Grant	6	11	14	11	8
3	(Egypt) Omar Mosaad	11	13	12	6	11

== See also ==
- Women's Kuala Lumpur Open Squash Championships 2012
- PSA World Tour 2012
- Kuala Lumpur Open Squash Championships
