= 2018 Men's British Open Squash Championship =

British Open
- Men's British Open

Details
- Event name: Allam British Open 2018
- Location: Hull, England
- Venue: Airco Arena
- Dates: 13–20 May 2018

Men's Winner
- Category: World Series
- Prize money: $165,000
- Year: World Tour 2018

The Men's Allam British Open 2018 is the men's edition of the 2018 British Open Squash Championships, which is a PSA World Series event (Prize money : 165,000 $). The event took place at the Airco Arena in Hull in England from 13–20 May 2018. Miguel Ángel Rodríguez won his first British Open trophy, beating Mohamed El Shorbagy in the final.

== Seeds ==
1. (Egypt) Mohamed El Shorbagy
2. (Egypt) Ali Farag
3. (France) Grégory Gaultier
4. (Egypt) Marwan El Shorbagy
5. (Egypt) Tarek Momen
6. (Germany) Simon Rösner
7. (Egypt) Karim Abdel Gawad
8. (Egypt) Ramy Ashour

== Draw and results ==
First round
1	(Egypt) Mohd El Shorbagy	5	6	11	11	11
(Peru) Diego Elías	11	11	4	8	4
(France) Grégoire Marche	11	2	8	11	12
(Australia) Ryan Cuskelly	9	11	11	7	10
(New Zealand) Paul Coll	11	11	4	11
(England) George Parker	9	6	11	8
7	(Egypt) Karim Abdel Gawad	9	6	11	11	11
(England) Daryl Selby	11	11	3	2	4
6	(Germany) Simon Rösner	11	11	11
(England) Declan James	8	9	6
(India) Saurav Ghosal	11	8	6	11	11
(Scotland) Greg Lobban	9	11	11	7	3
(Egypt) Mohamed Abouelghar	11	12	11
(Wales) Joel Makin	9	10	9
3	(France) Grégory Gaultier	11	11	11
(Australia) Cameron Pilley	5	7	4
4	(Egypt) Marwan El Shorbagy	11	11	11
(England) James Willstrop	8	9	8
(Mexico) César Salazar	11	8	11	9	13
(Switzerland) Nicolas Müller	9	11	5	11	11
(France) Mathieu Castagnet	7	7	9
(Germany) Raphael Kandra	11	11	11
(England) Nick Matthew	11	10	11	8	11
5	(Egypt) Tarek Momen	4	12	4	11	2
(Colombia) Miguel Á. Rodríguez	7	11	11	11
8	(Egypt) Ramy Ashour	11	8	2	4
(England) Ben Coleman	10	11	6	5
(Egypt) Omar Mosaad	12	5	11	11
(Hong Kong) Max Lee	11	11	3	11
(England) Adrian Waller	4	7	11	5
(England) Chris Simpson	5	5	6
2	(Egypt) Ali Farag	11	11	11

Second round
1	(Egypt) El Shorbagy	8	4	11	11	11
(France) Marche	11	11	7	7	7
(New Zealand) Coll	3	11	8	11	11
7	(Egypt) Gawad	11	4	11	5	5
6	(Germany) Rösner	11	11	11
(India) Ghosal	6	7	3
(Egypt) Abouelghar	3	9	3
3	(France) Gaultier	11	11	11
4	(Egypt) El Shorbagy	12	5	11	11
(Mexico) Salazar	10	11	6	8
(Germany) Kandra	9	11	11	11
(England) Matthew	11	7	9	8
(Colombia) Rodríguez	11	7	12	11
(Egypt) Mosaad	6	11	10	1
(Hong Kong) Lee	7	11	5	2
2	(Egypt) Farag	11	7	11	11

Quarter finals
1	(Egypt) El Shorbagy	11	6	12	11
(New Zealand) Coll	6	11	10	7
6	(Germany) Rösner	7	6	5
3	(France) Gaultier	11	11	11
4	(Egypt) El Shorbagy	7	13	11	11	6
(Germany) Kandra	11	11	6	13	11
(Colombia) Rodríguez	11	11	9	11
2	(Egypt) Farag	8	6	11	6

Semi-finals
1	(Egypt) El Shorbagy	8	11	11	3	11
3	(France) Gaultier	11	6	6	11	5
Final
1	(Egypt) El Shorbagy	7	11	11	2	9
(Colombia) Rodríguez	11	6	8	11	11
(Germany) Kandra	5	11	4	3
(Colombia) Rodríguez	11	5	11	11

== See also ==
- 2018 Women's British Open Squash Championship
- 2018–19 PSA Men's World Squash Championship
