= Malaysian Open Squash Championships =

Malaysian Open

Details
- Event name: Malaysian Open Squash Championships
- Location: Kuala Lumpur, Malaysia
- Venue: National Squash Centre

Men's Winner
- Category: World Tour Bronze
- Prize money: $52,500
- Most recent champion(s): (Egypt) Mazen Hesham
- Current: Men's Malaysian Open Squash Championships 2022

Women's Winner
- Category: World Tour Bronze
- Prize money: $52,500
- Most recent champion(s): (Belgium) Nele Gilis
- Current: Women's Malaysian Open Squash Championships 2022

The Malaysian Open Squash Championships is an annual squash tournament that takes place in Kuala Lumpur, Malaysia in July. The event is organised by the Squash Racquets Association of Malaysia and is the most prestigious squash tournament in Malaysia. The event was established in 1975.

== Past Results ==
=== Men's ===
Year	Champion	Runner-up	Score in final
2022	(Egypt) Mazen Hesham	(Egypt) Tarek Momen	2-11, 8-11, 11-6, 11-8, 11-5
2021	(India) Saurav Ghosal	(Colombia) Miguel Rodríguez	11-7, 11-8, 13-11
2020	Cancelled due to COVID-19 pandemic in Malaysia		
2019	(Malaysia) Ng Eain Yow	(Switzerland) Nicolas Müller	11-7, 12-14, 11-9, 11-5
2018	(Qatar) Abdulla Al Tamimi	(Hong Kong) Yip Tsz Fung	5-11, 12-10, 11-1, 7-11, 11-5
2017	(Hong Kong) Leo Au	(Malaysia) Ng Eain Yow	11-6, 11-2, 11-4
2016	No competition		
2015	No competition		
2014	(Egypt) Mohamed El Shorbagy	(Hong Kong) Max Lee	11-9, 11-5, 11-7
2013	(England) Peter Barker	(Egypt) Tarek Momen	11-5, 9-11, 11-5, 11-3
2012	(Egypt) Tarek Momen	(Egypt) Mohamed El Shorbagy	12-10, 6-11, 12-10, 8-11, 14-12
2011	(France) Grégory Gaultier	(Pakistan) Aamir Atlas Khan	11-8, 11-3, 11-3
2010	(Malaysia) Mohd Azlan Iskandar	(Egypt) Tarek Momen	11-5, 11-6, 11-8
2009	(Egypt) Amr Shabana	(England) Nick Matthew	5-11, 11-9, 11-6, 11-4
2008	(Malaysia) Ong Beng Hee	(Malaysia) Mohd Azlan Iskandar	11-6, 8-11, 4-11, 12-10, 11-8
2007	(Malaysia) Mohd Azlan Iskandar	(Australia) Stewart Boswell	13-11, 11-8, 11-4
2006	(England) Adrian Grant	(Australia) Cameron Pilley	7-11, 11-6, 11-3, 11-6
2005	(Egypt) Amr Shabana	(England) Nick Matthew	5-11, 11-9, 11-6, 11-4
2004	(Malaysia) Mohd Azlan Iskandar	(Egypt) Wael El Hindi	11-13, 11-5, 11-5, 11-7
2003	(Australia) Mike Corren	(India) Saurav Ghosal	15-14, 15-6, 15-10
2002	No competition		
2001	(Australia) Anthony Ricketts	(Australia) Joseph Kneipp	15-7, 15-6 (retired)
2000	(Malaysia) Ong Beng Hee	(Australia) John Williams	16-17, 15-6, 15-8, 15-10
1999	No competition		
1998	No competition		
1997	No competition		
1996	No competition		
1995	(England) Simon Parke	(England) Del Harris	15-14, 15-6, 15-7
1994	No competition		
1993	No competition		
1992	(Australia) Chris Dittmar	(Australia) Rodney Martin	
1991	(Pakistan) Jansher Khan	(Australia) Brett Martin	17-16, 12-15, 15-5, 15-6
1990	(Australia) Rodney Martin	(Australia) Chris Dittmar	7-15, 15-8, 15-9, 15-6
1989	No competition		
1988	No competition		
1987	(Pakistan) Jansher Khan	(Pakistan) Qamar Zaman	9-2, 9-0, 9-3
1986	(Pakistan) Qamar Zaman	(Pakistan) Jansher Khan	w/o
1985	(Pakistan) Jahangir Khan	(Australia) Kelvin Smith	9-0, 9-0, 9-5
1984	(Australia) Greg Pollard	(Pakistan) Maqsood Ahmed	10-8, 9-6, 1-9, 9-3

=== Women's ===
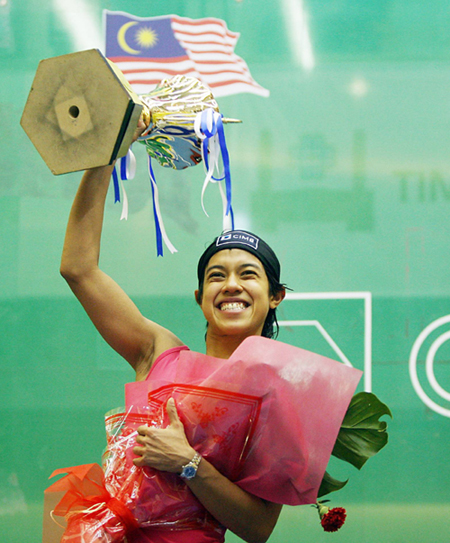
Nicol David holding her Malaysian Squash Open 2007 trophy.

Year	Champion	Runner-up	Score in final
2022	(Belgium) Nele Gilis	(United States) Olivia Fiechter	5-11, 11-5, 13-11, 11-9
2021	(Malaysia) Aifa Azman	(Egypt) Salma Hany	12-10, 11-8, 11-4
2020	Cancelled due to COVID-19 pandemic in Malaysia		
2019	(Malaysia) Rachel Arnold	(Malaysia) Low Wee Wern	11-7, 11-13, 10-12, 11-8, 11-5
2018	(Malaysia) Low Wee Wern	(Japan) Satomi Watanabe	11-8, 11-7, 11-4
2017	(Malaysia) S. Sivasangari	(South Africa) Milnay Louw	11-9, 11-3, 11-5
2016	No competition		
2015	No competition		
2014	(Egypt) Raneem El Weleily	(Egypt) Nour El Tayeb	7-11, 11-3, 12-10, 2-11, 11-7
2013	(Malaysia) Nicol David	(Egypt) Raneem El Weleily	11-8, 11-7, 11-6
2012	(Egypt) Raneem El Weleily	(Malaysia) Nicol David	12-10, 11-13, 11-6, 11-2
2011	(Malaysia) Nicol David	(England) Jenny Duncalf	11-6, 12-10, 11-5
2010	(Malaysia) Nicol David	(England) Jenny Duncalf	11-6, 6-11, 11-7, 10-12, 11-5
2009	(Malaysia) Nicol David	(England) Alison Waters	11-6, 11-8, 9-11, 11-7
2008	(Malaysia) Nicol David	(Netherlands) Natalie Grinham	11-1, 11-4, 11-6
2007	(Malaysia) Nicol David	(England) Tania Bailey	9-4, 9-3, 9-2
2006	(Malaysia) Nicol David	(England) Tania Bailey	9-4, 9-6, 2-9 5-9, 9-3
2005	(Malaysia) Nicol David	(Netherlands) Vanessa Atkinson	3-9, 9-3, 1-9, 9-1, 9-4
2004	(Netherlands) Vanessa Atkinson	(Malaysia) Nicol David	9-2, 9-4, 9-0
2003	(England) Cassie Jackman	(Malaysia) Nicol David	9-5, 1-9, 9-4, 9-7
2002	(New Zealand) Carol Owens	(England) Rebecca Macree	9-2, 9-6, 9-1
2001	No competition		
2000	(England) Stephanie Brind	(Egypt) Maha Zein	9-6, 9-1, 9-1
1999	No competition		
1998	No competition		
1997	(Australia) Sarah Fitz-Gerald	(Australia) Michelle Martin	9-2, 0-9, 9-2, 8-10, 9-7
1996	(Australia) Sarah Fitz-Gerald	(England) Cassie Jackman	
1995	(Australia) Liz Irving	(Australia) Michelle Martin	
1994	(Australia) Michelle Martin	(England) Cassie Jackman	10-8, 9-3, 10-9
1993	(Australia) Michelle Martin	(Australia) Sarah Fitz-Gerald	6-9, 5-9, 9-2, 9-4, 9-1
1992	(Australia) Michelle Martin	(Australia) Robyn Lambourne	15-11, 15-10, 15-10
1991	(Australia) Michelle Martin	(England) Cassie Jackman	15-11, 15-6, 7-15, 15-13
1990	(England) Lisa Opie	(Australia) Danielle Drady	
1989	No competition		
1988	(England) Lisa Opie	(Australia) Michelle Martin	
1987	(England) Lucy Soutter	(England) Alison Cumings	
1986	(England) Lisa Opie	(England) Lucy Soutter	
1985	(Singapore) Geraldine Yeo	(Japan) Miyuki Adachi	
1984	(Singapore) Lim Siok Hui	(Switzerland) Barbara Hartmann	
1983	(Singapore) Chia Chew Lan	(Singapore) Geraldine Yeo	
1982	(Singapore) Sue Paton	(Japan) Machiko Miyagishima	
1981	(Singapore) Sue Paton	(India) Bhuvneshwari Kumari	
1980	(Singapore) Sue Paton	(Singapore) Tracey Oh	
1979	(Japan) M Miyagishina	(Singapore) Tracey Oh	
1978	(Singapore) Annette Andrews	(Singapore) Tracey Oh	
1977	(Singapore) Annette Andrews	(Philippines) Rose Trablante	
1976	(Singapore) Annette Andrews	(Malaysia) Glynne Wong	
1975	(Singapore) Helen Chinchen	(Malaysia) Glynne Wong	

== See also ==
- Kuala Lumpur Open Squash Championships
