= Men's Kuala Lumpur Open Squash Championships 2013 =

Kuala Lumpur Open Squash Championships 2013

Details
- Event name: CIMB Kuala Lumpur Open Squash Championships 2013
- Location: Kuala Lumpur Malaysia
- Venue: Berjaya Times Square
- Website klopensquash.com

Men's Winner
- Category: International 50
- Prize money: $50,000
- Year: World Tour 2013

The Men's CIMB Kuala Lumpur Open Squash Championships 2013 was the men's edition of the 2013 Kuala Lumpur Open Squash Championships, a tournament of the PSA World Tour event International (Prize money : 50 000 $). The event took place in Kuala Lumpur in Malaysia from 28 to 31 March. Karim Darwish won his second CIMB Kuala Lumpur Open trophy, beating Mohamed El Shorbagy in the final.

== Prize money and ranking points ==
For 2013, the prize purse was $50,000. The prize money and points breakdown is as follows:

Prize Money CIMB Kuala Lumpur Open (2013)
Event	W	F	SF	QF	1R
Points (PSA)	875	575	350	215	125
Prize money	$8,075	$5,525	$3,615	$2,230	$1,275

== Seeds ==
1. (Egypt) Karim Darwish (champion)
2. (Egypt) Mohamed El Shorbagy (final)
3. (Egypt) Omar Mosaad (first round)
4. (Spain) Borja Golán (semifinals)

== Draw and results ==
First round
1	(Egypt) Karim Darwish	11	11	11
Q	(Malaysia) Ivan Yuen	5	4	5
(Finland) Olli Tuominen	12	11	12
Q	(Hong Kong) Max Lee	10	8	10
(Switzerland) Nicolas Müller	11	11	11
WC	(Malaysia) Muhd Asyraf Azan	5	6	4
(Malaysia) Ong Beng Hee	9	11	11	9
3	(Egypt) Omar Mosaad	11	6	6	4
4	(Spain) Borja Golán	11	8	11	11
Q	(Malaysia) Mohd Nafi. Adnan	7	7	4
(India) Saurav Ghosal	6	11	11	6	5
(Egypt) Tarek Momen	11	8	5	11	11
(Egypt) Karim Abdel Gawad	11	7	11	11
(Australia) Cameron Pilley	9	11	7	3
Q	(Scotland) Alan Clyne	5	9	5
2	(Egypt) Mohd El Shorbagy	11	11	11

Quarter finals
1	(Egypt) Karim Darwish	11	11	11
(Finland) Olli Tuominen	10	5	6
(Switzerland) Nicolas Müller	11	11	7	12	11
(Malaysia) Ong Beng Hee	13	9	11	10	9
4	(Spain) Borja Golán	11	7	9	11	11
(Egypt) Tarek Momen	9	11	11	9	9
(Egypt) Karim Abdel Gawad	7	6	9
2	(Egypt) Mohd El Shorbagy	11	11	11

Semi finals
1	(Egypt) Karim Darwish	11	11	11
(Switzerland) Nicolas Müller	9	5	4
4	(Spain) Borja Golán	6	5	6
2	(Egypt) Mohd El Shorbagy	11	11	11

Final
1	(Egypt) Karim Darwish	11	12	11
2	(Egypt) Mohd El Shorbagy	9	10	7

== See also ==
- Women's Kuala Lumpur Open Squash Championships 2013
- PSA World Tour 2013
- Kuala Lumpur Open Squash Championships
