= Montréal Open (squash) =

Details
- Event name: Montréal Open
- Location: Montréal, Canada

Men's PSA World Tour
- Category: World Tour PSA 25
- Prize money: $25,000

The Montréal Open is a yearly professional men's squash tournament held in Montréal, Canada. It takes place every year in late February/early March. It is part of the PSA World Tour. In its current incarnation it is a PSA25 tournament, down from PSA35 in the past.

== Results ==
These are the results from 2010 onwards:

Year	Dates	Winner	Runner-up	References
2010	3-6 Mar	(England) Daryl Selby	(Australia) Thierry Lincou	
2011	21-25 Mar	(Egypt) Hisham Mohd Ashour	(Australia) David Palmer	
2012	20-23 Mar	(England) Tom Richards	(France) Thierry Lincou	
2013	3-6 Oct	(Spain) Borja Golán	(England) Daryl Selby	
2014	19-24 Oct	(France) Mathieu Castagnet	(Colombia) Miguel Ángel Rodríguez	
2016	3-6 Mar	(Egypt) Ali Farag	(Egypt) Karim Abdel Gawad	
2017	28-31 Mar	(Mexico) César Salazar	(Egypt) Omar Abdel Meguid	
2018	28 Feb - 3 Mar	(Spain) Borja Golán	(Egypt) Mohd Nafiizwan Adnan	
2019	6-10 May	(England) Adrian Waller	(Mexico) Arturo Salazar	
2020-2023 not held
2024	7-11 Feb	(Scotland) Greg Lobban	(England) Nathan Lake	
2025	12-16 Feb	(Germany) Raphael Kandra	(Canada) David Baillargeon	

== See also ==
- PSA World Tour
