= Men's Malaysian Open Squash Championships 2012 =

Malaysian Open 2012

Details
- Event name: Malaysian Open Squash Championships 2012
- Location: Kuala Lumpur Malaysia
- Venue: National Squash Centre; Bukit Jalil
- Website www.squashsite.co.uk/2009/malaysian2012.htm

Men's Winner
- Category: International 50
- Prize money: $50,000
- Year: World Tour 2012

The Men's Malaysian Open Squash Championships 2012 is the men's edition of the 2012 Malaysian Open Squash Championships, which is a tournament of the PSA World Tour event International (Prize money : 50 000 $). The event took place in Kuala Lumpur in Malaysia from the 12 September to the 15 September. Tarek Momen won his first Malaysian Open trophy, beating Mohamed El Shorbagy in the final.

== Prize money and ranking points ==
For 2012, the prize purse was $ 50,000. The prize money and points breakdown is as follows:

Prize Money Malaysian Open (2012)
Event	W	F	SF	QF	1R
Points (PSA)	875	575	350	215	125
Prize money	$ 8,075	$ 5,525	$ 3,615	$ 2,230	$ 1,275

== Seeds ==
1. (Egypt) Karim Darwish (quarterfinals)
2. (Egypt) Mohamed El Shorbagy (final)
3. (Egypt) Omar Mosaad (first round)
4. (England) Adrian Grant (first round)

== Draw and results ==
First round
1	(Egypt) Karim Darwish	11	11	11
Q	(India) Siddharth Suchde	3	4	6
(Spain) Borja Golán	11	4	11	11
(Australia) Cameron Pilley	9	11	6	7
(Egypt) Tarek Momen	11	11	4	13
Q	(Hong Kong) Max Lee	4	8	11	11
WC	(Malaysia) Mohd Nafi. Adnan	9	5	11	11	13
4	(England) Adrian Grant	11	11	9	4	11
3	(Egypt) Omar Mosaad	11	4	6	8
Q	(Kuwait) Abdullah Al Muzayen	6	11	11	11
(Malaysia) Ong Beng Hee	2	5	2
(Switzerland) Nicolas Müller	11	11	11
(Finland) Olli Tuominen	8	11	12	10	11
(India) Saurav Ghosal	11	6	10	12	5
Q	(Egypt) Karim Abdel Gawad	6	1
2	(Egypt) Mohd El Shorbagy	11	6

Quarter finals
1	(Egypt) Karim Darwish	3	10
(Spain) Borja Golán	11	12
(Egypt) Tarek Momen	11	11	11	11
WC	(Malaysia) Mohd Nafi. Adnan	8	4	13	4
Q	(Kuwait) Abdullah Al Muzayen	12	5	4	0
(Switzerland) Nicolas Müller	10	11	11	11
(Finland) Olli Tuominen	8	9	11	11	8
2	(Egypt) Mohd El Shorbagy	11	11	1	5	11

Semi finals
(Spain) Borja Golán	15	7	6	6
(Egypt) Tarek Momen	13	11	11	11
(Switzerland) Nicolas Müller	13	7	12	8	8
2	(Egypt) Mohd El Shorbagy	11	11	10	11	11

Final
(Egypt) Tarek Momen	12	6	12	8	14
2	(Egypt) Mohd El Shorbagy	10	11	10	11	12

== See also ==
- PSA World Tour 2012
- Malaysian Open Squash Championships
- Women's Malaysian Open Squash Championships 2012
