= Valtierra (surname) =

Valtierra is a surname. Notable people with the surname include:

- Alberto Valtierra (1931–2013), Spanish rower
- Erik Tepos Valtierra (born 1986), Mexican squash player
- Ramón Ramírez Valtierra (born 1964), Mexican politician
- Rubén Valtierra (born 1954), American keyboardist
