= Swedish Squash Open 2013 =

Swedish Open 2013
- 10th Swedish Open

Details
- Event name: Case Swedish Open 2013
- Location: Linköping Sweden
- Venue: Linköping Sporthalle
- Website www.swedishopensquash.se

Men's Winner
- Category: World Tour International 70
- Prize money: $70,000
- Year: World Tour 2013

The Case Swedish Open 2013 was the 2013 edition of Swedish Open, a PSA World Tour international tournament (prize money: $70,000). The event took place in Linköping in Sweden from 31 January to 3 February. Grégory Gaultier won his second Swedish Open trophy, beating Nick Matthew in the final.

== Prize money and ranking points ==
For 2013, the prize purse was $70,000. The prize money and points breakdown is as follows:

Prize Money Swedish Open (2013)
Event	W	F	SF	QF	1R
Points (PSA)	1225	805	490	300	175
Prize money	$11,875	$8,125	$5,315	$3,280	$1,875

== Seeds ==
1. (England) Nick Matthew (final)
2. (France) Grégory Gaultier (champion)
3. (England) Peter Barker (semifinals)
4. (England) Daryl Selby (first round)

== Draw and results ==
1* First round 2*
1	(England) Nick Matthew	11	11	11
Q	(England) Chris Simpson	6	5	3
(Australia) Cameron Pilley	11	10	8	11	11
Q	(Finland) Henrik Mustonen	7	12	11	7	2
(Netherlands) Laurens Jan Anjema	11	7	9	12	5
(Egypt) Karim Abdel Gawad	6	11	11	10	11
(Egypt) Tarek Momen	3	12	9	11	11
4	(England) Daryl Selby	11	10	11	8	8
3	(England) Peter Barker	11	11	11
Q	(England) Adrian Waller	5	8	9
(Germany) Simon Rösner	11	11	11
WC	(Sweden) Rasmus Hult	7	3	2
(England) Tom Richards	11	11	13	11
Q	(England) Jonathan Kemp	7	7	15	7
(Switzerland) Nicolas Müller	9	4	6
2	(France) Grégory Gaultier	11	11	11

1* Quarter finals 2*
1	(England) Nick Matthew	11	11	11
(Australia) Cameron Pilley	7	6	5
(Egypt) Karim Abdel Gawad	18	3	9
(Egypt) Tarek Momen	20	11	11
3	(England) Peter Barker	11	5	11	11
(Germany) Simon Rösner	8	11	9	9
(England) Tom Richards	10	5	3
2	(France) Grégory Gaultier	12	11	11

Semi finals
1	(England) Nick Matthew
(Egypt) Tarek Momen	w/o
3	(England) Peter Barker	6	3	2
2	(France) Grégory Gaultier *	11	11	11

Final
1	(England) Nick Matthew	3	10	9
2	(France) Grégory Gaultier *	11	12	11

== See also ==
- PSA World Tour 2013
- Swedish Open (squash)
