= Colombian Open (squash) =

Details
- Event name: Abierto Colombiano De Squash
- Location: Bogotá, Colombia
- Venue: Club El Nogal

Men's Winner
- Category: International 50
- Prize money: $50,000
- Most recent champion(s): Alfredo Ávila
- Current: Colombian Open (squash) 2015

The Colombian Open is a squash tournament held in Bogotá, Colombia in August. It is part of the PSA World Tour. The event was first held in 1995.

== Past Results ==
=== Men's ===
Year	Champion	Runner-up	Score in final
2015	(Mexico) Alfredo Ávila	(India) Saurav Ghosal	11-9, 8-11, 11-4, 11-8
2014	(Colombia) Miguel Ángel Rodríguez	(Egypt) Omar Mosaad	9-11, 11-7, 11-7, 11-1
2013	(England) Peter Barker	(Egypt) Omar Mosaad	11-4, 11-4, 8-11, 11-3
2012	(Egypt) Tarek Momen	(Colombia) Miguel Ángel Rodríguez	3-11, 11-4, 11-3, 12-10
2011	(Egypt) Mohamed El Shorbagy	(Netherlands) Laurens Jan Anjema	7-11, 11-7, 11-8, 2-11, 17-15
2010	(Colombia) Miguel Ángel Rodríguez	(Finland) Olli Tuominen	9-11, 11-9, 11-5, 11-5
2009	(Australia) David Palmer	(Spain) Borja Golán	12-10, 11-13, 12-10, 5-11, 12-12 ret.
2008	(Colombia) Miguel Ángel Rodríguez	(Mexico) Jorge Isaac Baltazar Ferreira	3-11, 11-4, 11-3, 12-10
2007	(England) Peter Barker	(Spain) Borja Golán	13-11,11-8,11-6
2006	(England) Peter Barker	(Colombia) Miguel Ángel Rodríguez	11-6, 13-11, 11-7
2005	(England) Peter Barker	(Australia) Raj Nanda	11-6, 11-1, 11-4
2004	No competition		
2003	No competition		
2002	(France) Renan Lavigne	(Australia) John Williams	17-16, 15-12, 14-17, 15-10
2001	(France) Renan Lavigne	(Egypt) Wael El Hindi	15-13, 15-0, 15-6
2000	(England) Stephen Meads	(England) Tim Garner	15-5, 15-12, 15-12
1999	(Finland) Olli Tuominen	(England) Peter Genever	15-14, 17-15, 15-10
1998	(Australia) Stewart Boswell	(France) Thierry Lincou	13-15, 15-10, 15-5, 4-15, 15-12
1997	(England) Tony Hands	(France) Thierry Lincou	
1996	(England) Tim Garner	(Scotland) Stuart Cowie	
1995	(Belgium) Stefan Casteleyn	(Argentina) Federico Usandizaga	15-12, 15-6, 15-10
