= Kuala Lumpur Open Squash Championships =

CIMB KL Open Squash Championships

Details
- Event name: CIMB Kuala Lumpur Open Squash Championships
- Location: Kuala Lumpur Malaysia
- Venue: Berjaya Times Square
- Website klopensquash.com

Men's Winner
- Category: International 50
- Prize money: $50,000
- Most recent champion(s): (Egypt) Karim Darwish
- Current: Men's Kuala Lumpur Open Squash Championships 2013

Women's Winner
- Category: World Series Gold
- Prize money: $70,000
- Most recent champion(s): (England) Laura Massaro
- Current: Women's Kuala Lumpur Open Squash Championships 2013

The Kuala Lumpur Open Squash Championships is an annual squash tournament held in Kuala Lumpur, Malaysia. The tournament is sponsored by CIMB.

== Men's championship ==
Year	Champion	Runner-up	Score
2014	No competition		
2013	(Egypt) Karim Darwish	(Egypt) Mohamed El Shorbagy	11-9, 12-10, 11-7
2012	(Egypt) Omar Mosaad	(England) Adrian Grant	11–6, 13–11, 12–14, 6-11, 11-8
2011	(Egypt) Karim Darwish	(Egypt) Mohamed El Shorbagy	11–9, 11–9, 11–3
2010	(Egypt) Ramy Ashour	(Egypt) Karim Darwish	11–8, 11–8, 11–9
2009	(England) Peter Barker	(England) Adrian Grant	11–6, 11–2, 11–4
2008	(Malaysia) Ong Beng Hee	(Malaysia) Mohd Azlan Iskandar	11-8, 15-13, 12-10
2007	(Egypt) Mohammed Abbas	(Australia) Stewart Boswell	11–6, 11–5, 11–5
2006	(Malaysia) Mohd Azlan Iskandar	(Malaysia) Ong Beng Hee	6–11, 11–8, 12-10, 6-11, 11-4
2005	(Pakistan) Shamsul Islam Khan	(Egypt) Amr Mansi	11-13, 11-6, 11-1, 11-8
2004	(Egypt) Wael El Hindi	(Netherlands) Laurens Jan Anjema	15-2, 7-15, 15-11, 15-10
2003	(Malaysia) Mohd Azlan Iskandar	(Netherlands) Tommy Berden	15-10, 15-9, 3-15, 15-5
2002	(Australia) Mike Corren	(Malaysia) Kenneth Low	15-6, 15-11, 15-12
2001	(Netherlands) Tommy Berden	(Malaysia) Kenneth Low	15-12, 15-2, 17-16
2000	(Pakistan) Ajaz Azmat	(Pakistan) Mansoor Zaman	9-15, 15-8, 15-11, 15-6
1999	(Malaysia) Kenneth Low	(Malaysia) Ong Beng Hee	11-15, 15-6, 15-13, 1-15, 15-8

== Women's championship ==
Year	Champion	Runner-up	Score
2014	not held due to the 2013 World Open		
2013	(England) Laura Massaro	(England) Alison Waters	11-9, 11-7, 11-6
2012	(Malaysia) Nicol David	(Hong Kong) Annie Au	11-4, 12-10, 11-9
2011	(Malaysia) Nicol David	(Republic of Ireland) Madeline Perry	11-6, 11-6, 11-2
2010	(Malaysia) Nicol David	(Egypt) Omneya Abdel Kawy	11-8, 10-12, 11-7, 5-11, 11-8
2009	(United States) Natalie Grainger	(Malaysia) Nicol David	9–4, 9–2, 9–2
2008	(Malaysia) Nicol David	(Netherlands) Natalie Grinham	9–4, 9–2, 9–2
2007	(Malaysia) Nicol David	(Australia) Natalie Grinham	6–9 9–3, 9–6, 7–9, 9–6
2006	(Netherlands) Vanessa Atkinson	(Malaysia) Nicol David	9-7, 4-9, 9-1, 9-3
2005	(Malaysia) Nicol David	(Netherlands) Annelize Naudé	9–4, 9–2, 9–0
2004	No competition		
2003	No competition		
2002	(Malaysia) Nicol David	(Denmark) Ellen Petersen	9–2, 9–7, 8–10, 9–4
2001	(Australia) Rachael Grinham	(Australia) Natalie Grinham	7-9, 0-9 (retired)
2000	(Malaysia) Nicol David	(Norway) Elin Blikra	9-2, 9-5, 9-5
1999	(Malaysia) Carol Owens	(Malaysia) Nicol David	9-0, 9-2, 9-5

== See also ==
- Malaysian Open Squash Championships
- British Open Squash Championships
- British Junior Open Squash
- World Open
