= Sky Open =

Details
- Event name: Sky Open
- Location: Cairo, Egypt

Men's Winner
- Category: International 50
- Prize money: $50,000
- Most recent champion(s): (Egypt) Mohamed El Shorbagy
- Current: Sky Open 2013

The Sky Open is a men's squash tournament held in Cairo, Egypt. It was part of the PSA World Series in 2009 and 2010, the highest level of men's professional squash competition.

== Past results ==
Year	Champion	Runner-up	Score in final
2014	No competition		
2013	(Egypt) Mohamed El Shorbagy	(Egypt) Karim Darwish	11-2, 11-7, 11-8
2012	No competition		
2011	No competition		
2010	(England) Nick Matthew	(Egypt) Karim Darwish	6-11, 11-7, 12-10, 13-11
2009	(Egypt) Karim Darwish	(France) Grégory Gaultier	11-6, 7-11, 6-11, 11-9, 11-3
2008	(Egypt) Wael El Hindi	(Egypt) Karim Darwish	11-8, 11-5, 5-11, 11-9
