= Erik Tepos Valtierra =

Mexican squash player (born 1986)

Personal information
- Born: November 28, 1986 (age 39) Mexico City, Mexico
- Height: 1.66 m (5 ft 5 in)
- Weight: 62 kg (137 lb)

Sport
- Country: Mexico
- Turned pro: 2008
- Coached by: Luis Tepos Valtierra
- Retired: Active
- Racquet used: Head

Men's singles
- Highest ranking: No. 89 (July, 2011)
- Current ranking: No. 168 (May, 2014)
- Updated on May, 2014

Erik Tepos Valtierra (born November 28, 1986, in Mexico City) is a professional squash player who represented Mexico. He reached a career-high world ranking of World No. 89 in July 2011.
