= Matthew Karwalski =

Australian squash player (born 1985)

Personal information
- Nickname: Killer
- Born: 3 December 1985 (age 40) Wagga Wagga, Australia
- Height: 1.83 m (6 ft 0 in)
- Weight: 70 kg (150 lb)
- Website: https://www.facebook.com/killer.karwalski

Sport
- Country: Australia
- Handedness: Right Handed
- Turned pro: 2007
- Coached by: David Palmer
- Retired: Retired
- Racquet used: Grays

Men's singles
- Highest ranking: No. 49 (December, 2013)
- Current ranking: No. 61 (November, 2014)
- Title: 3
- Tour final: 7
- Updated on November, 2014

Matthew Karwalski (born 3 February 1985 in Wagga Wagga) is an Australian professional squash player. He reached a career-high world ranking of World No. 49 in December 2013. He participated in the WSF Men's World Team Championship 2013 in Mulhouse, France and also represented Australia in the Glasgow 2014 Commonwealth Games.
