= Eddie Charlton (squash player) =

English professional squash player (born 1988)

Personal information
- Born: 11 July 1988 (age 38) Nottingham, England
- Height: 1.87 m (6 ft 2 in)
- Weight: 78 kg (172 lb)

Sport
- Country: England
- Turned pro: 2007
- Coached by: David Campion, Fiona Geaves
- Retired: Active
- Racquet used: Mantis

Men's singles
- Highest ranking: No. 50 (April 2015)
- Current ranking: No. 53 (August 2015)
- Title: 5
- Tour final: 14
- Updated on August 2015

Eddie Charlton (born 11 July 1988 in Nottingham) is a professional squash player who represents England. He reached a career-high world ranking of World No. 50 in April 2015. He coaches Sara Thomas.

Currently the head pro at the Toledo Club. Previously the head pro at University Club of Chicago. Eddie loves the community atmosphere of the sport.
