= Charles Sharpes =

English squash player (born 1992)

Personal information
- Born: 6 February 1992 (age 34) Bermondsey, London, England
- Height: 1.78 m (5 ft 10 in)
- Weight: 70 kg (154 lb)

Sport
- Country: England
- Handedness: Right-Handed
- Turned pro: 2009
- Coached by: Paul Carter
- Retired: Active
- Racquet used: Prince

Men's singles
- Highest ranking: No. 48 (February 2017)
- Current ranking: No. 48 (March 2017)
- Title: 4
- Tour final: 7
- Updated on March 2017

Charles Sharpes (born 6 February 1992 in London) is a professional squash player who represents England. He reached a career-high world ranking of World No. 48 in February 2017.
