= Omar Abdel Aziz =

Egyptian squash player (born 1983)

Personal information
- Born: September 11, 1983 (age 42) Cairo, Egypt
- Height: 1.80 m (5 ft 11 in)
- Weight: 74 kg (163 lb)

Sport
- Country: Egypt
- Turned pro: 2004
- Coached by: Amir Wagih; Ahmed Matany
- Retired: 2015
- Racquet used: Head

Men's singles
- Highest ranking: No. 31 (June, 2010)
- Title: 6
- Tour final: 13
- Updated on June, 2017

Omar Abdel Aziz (Arabic: عُمَر عَبْد الْعَزِيز; born September 11, 1983, in Cairo) is a former professional squash player who represented Egypt.

== Career ==
Aziz reached a career-high ranking of World No. 31 in June 2010.
