= Andrew Wagih Shoukry =

Egyptian squash player (born 1990)

Andrew Shoukry
Personal information
- Full name: Andrew Wagih Shoukry
- Born: September 25, 1990 (age 35) Cairo, Egypt
- Height: 1.83 m (6 ft 0 in)
- Weight: 65 kg (143 lb)
- Website: https://www.instagram.com/shoukrysquashacademy/

Sport
- Country: Egypt
- Handedness: Right handed
- Turned pro: 2007
- Coached by: Ahmed Matany, Anthony Hill, Omar El-Borolossi, Emad Koratum, Karim Darwish
- Retired: Active
- Racquet used: Tecnifibre/Harrow

Men's singles
- Highest ranking: No.48 (May, 2013)
- Current ranking: No. 379 (April, 2020)
- Title: 23
- Tour final: 34
- Updated on May, 2020

Andrew Wagih Shoukry (born September 25, 1990) is a professional squash player who represented Egypt. He reached a career-high junior world ranking of No. 3.

Shoukry joined the PSA World Tour in 2007 and was coached by his compatriot and former World No. 1 Karim Darwish. He claimed his first PSA World Tour title the same year at the Kengen Parklands Open and followed that up with two further titles in a successful 2010. His fifth PSA World Tour title came at the Tour de las Americas – Regatas de Resistencia Open with a victory over Jan Koukal in the final in May 2012. More high finishes at a number of events over the year meant that Shoukry would climb into the world's top 50 for the first time in March 2013. He would face a year-long wait for another title before securing back-to-back successes at the London Open and PSA Valencia Open. Shoukry rounded off his 2014/15 season with a quarter-final place at the Sharm El Sheikh International Championship.

He then shifted his expertise and talents on to younger generations as a coach from 2018 whilst opening his academy, Shoukry Squash Academy.
