= Shaun Le Roux =

South African squash player (born 1986)

Personal information
- Born: 27 September 1986 (age 39) Cape Town, South Africa
- Height: 1.85 m (6 ft 1 in)
- Weight: 85 kg (187 lb)

Sport
- Country: South Africa
- Turned pro: 2005
- Coached by: David Campion
- Retired: Active
- Racquet used: Karakal

Men's singles
- Highest ranking: No. 37 (March, 2015)
- Current ranking: No. 47 (January, 2016)
- Updated on June, 2013

Shaun Le Roux (born September 27, 1986 in Cape Town) is a professional squash player who represents South Africa. He reached a career-high world ranking of 37 in the world in March 2015. He appeared as a contestant on BBC gameshow Pointless in May 2017.
