= Alfredo Ávila =

Mexican squash player (born 1991)

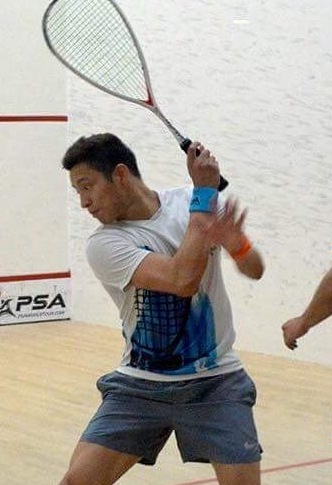

Personal information
- Full name: Alfredo Manuel Ávila Vergara
- Born: June 17, 1991 (age 35) Mexico City, Mexico
- Height: 1.69 m (5 ft 7 in)
- Weight: 64 kg (141 lb)

Sport
- Country: Mexican
- Turned pro: 2008
- Coached by: Rúben Alfredo Ávila Miyazawa y Ulises Márquez
- Retired: Active
- Racquet used: Head

Men's singles
- Highest ranking: No. 35 (January 2016)
- Current ranking: No. 96 (February 2026)
- Title: 23
Medal record
Men's squash
Representing Mexico
Pan American Games
Bronze medal – third place	2019 Lima	Team

Alfredo Manuel Ávila Vergara (born June 17, 1991), known as Alfredo Ávila, is a professional squash player who has represented Mexico. He reached a career-high world ranking of World No. 35 in January 2016.

== Biography ==
In 1998 at his young age (7 years old, he discovered his great sports talent within the squash, ten years later he became professional starting his walk through the PSA, since the beginning of his career, the player is positioned within the first three national places. He has been under the guidance of coaches Rubén Alfredo Avila Miyazawa and Ulises Márquez.

At youth level in 2009 and 2010 he reached the semifinals twice in the British Junior Open tournament, something that no Mexican player has achieved in the history of this sport.

Alfredo is the only Mexican player who has won a $50,000 DLL Professional tournament (Colombia 2015), a tournament in which world top 10 players participated. This earned him the appointment of player of the month in September 2015 by the PSA (Professional Squash Association) and by the English magazine Magazine Squash, something that no other Mexican has obtained.

In December 2025, he won his 22nd PSA title after securing victory in the CDMX Open during the 2025–26 PSA Squash Tour. Another title followed in January 2026, when he won the Gas City Open.
