= Zahed Mohamed =

Egyptian squash player (born 1992)

Zahed Salem
Personal information
- Born: 24 June 1992 (age 34) Alexandria, Egypt
- Height: 1.73 m (5 ft 8 in)

Sport
- Country: Egypt
- Turned pro: 2009
- Retired: Active
- Racquet used: Tecnifibre

Men's singles
- Highest ranking: No. 14 (March 2019)
- Current ranking: No. 186 (June 2025)
- Title: 8

Zahed Salem (born 24 June 1992), formerly known as Zahed Mohamed, is a professional squash player who represented Egypt. He reached a career high ranking of 14 in the world during March 2019.

== Career ==
Mohamed enjoyed a meteoric rise up the World Rankings in recent years and has performed consistently well since he joined the PSA World Tour as a 17-year-old. He lifted his first PSA World Tour title in 2011 at the Al Hassan Squash Open where he bested Qualifier Mazen Hesham in a comfortable 3–0 final rout.

He doubled his title tally a year later when he won the Royal Jordanian Squash Open, against the local player Ahmad Al-Saraj being the unlucky party this time round.

It was then Zahed's turn to be unlucky as a number of runner-up finishes followed over the next two years with a 3–2 defeat to Ali Farag in the 2015 Alexandria Open finale, particularly being a close match.

In October 2024, Salem won his 7th PSA title after securing victory in the Wakefield Open during the 2024–25 PSA Squash Tour. An eighth title arrived in June 2025 after winning the Atlanta Open.In June 2025, X won his/her x PSA title after securing victory in the X during the 2024–25 PSA Squash Tour.
