= Henrik Mustonen =

Finnish squash player (born 1990)

Personal information
- Nickname: Heke
- Born: 6 November 1990 (age 35) Hollola, Finland
- Height: 1.84 m (6 ft 0 in)
- Weight: 77 kg (170 lb)

Sport
- Country: Finland
- Handedness: Right Handed
- Turned pro: February 2008
- Coached by: Ville Sistonen (former Wr 55.) and Pekka Kainulainen
- Retired: Active

Men's singles
- Highest ranking: No. 35 (February 2014)
- Title: 4
- Tour final: 10
- World Open: Last 16 (2014)

Henrik Mustonen (born 6 November 1990 in Hollola) is a professional squash player from Finland. He reached a career-high world ranking of World No. 35 in February 2014.
