= Mazen Hesham =

Egyptian squash player

Personal information
- Nickname: Black Falcon
- Born: 29 March 1994 (age 32) Cairo, Egypt
- Years active: 6
- Height: 1.75 m (5 ft 9 in)
- Weight: 65 kg (143 lb)

Sport
- Country: Egyptian
- Handedness: Right Handed
- Turned pro: 2011
- Coached by: Omar Abdel Aziz
- Retired: Active
- Racquet used: Eye V Lite 124

Men's singles
- Highest ranking: No. 5 (May 2024)
- Current ranking: No. 19 (14 July 2025)
- Title: 7
- Tour final: 9
- World Open: R1 (2015)
- PSA Profile
Medal record
Men's squash
Representing Egypt
World Team Championships
| Gold medal – first place | 2023 Tauranga | Team |
| Gold medal – first place | 2024 Hong Kong | Team |
British Open
| Bronze medal – third place | 2022 Hull | Singles |
| Bronze medal – third place | 2023 Birmingham | Singles |

Mazen Hesham Al Sabry (Arabic: مَازِن هِشَام الصَّبْرِيّ; born 29 March 1994 in Cairo) is a professional squash player who represents Egypt. He is a two-times world team champion and reached a career-high world ranking of World No. 5 in May 2024.

== Career ==
Hesham first became prominent in 2012, when he secured third place in the WSF junior championships in Doha. Following this result, he joined the PSA world tour. Hesham secured his first PSA world tour title in March of the same year in the NSC scram series in Kuala Lumpur, Malaysia. He went on to help the Egyptian junior national team win the world title at the World Junior Team Squash Championships in July 2012. He helped the junior national team defend their crown against the second seed Pakistan.

Hesham went on to win his second PSA title in Hong Kong at the Crocodile Challenge Cup in August 2012. He upset the number one seed and defending champion Max Lee in the final 11–13, 6–11, 11–9, 11–4, 11–3. Hesham opened his second year as a part of the PSA world tour by winning the U-23 nationals for Egypt. He was crowned the best U-23 player in Egypt to start off 2013.

Hesham kept his momentum going to win his 3rd PSA world tour title in the West of Ireland Open in March 2013. He beat Steve Finitsis of Australia in four sets, in 56 minutes. Mazen had completed three World Tour titles and was now rising in the world rankings. During the year, he managed to take two more PSA world tour titles. The first was in May, when he managed to take the CCI international open in India. The second title was at the inaugural Maharashtra state PSA open. Mazen was the fourth seed, on his way to his 5th PSA title. He won this title with a win over compatriot Zahed Mohamed 11–5, 3–11, 11–7, 4–11, 11–8.

In April 2014, he won his sixth PSA title in Houston, defeating Stephen Coppinger of South Africa 3–1. This victory thrust Hesham into the top-30 in the world rankings for the first time in his career. In April 2015, Hesham returned to defend his title in Houston and once again beat Coppinger (in the semi-finals) before going on to defeat Adrian Grant of England in the final. In the same month, Hesham won the “shot of the month” and then won another shot of the month award in the Delaware Investments U.S. Open 2015 in October.

Hesham's first semi final appearance in a PSA World Series event was in the Qatar Classic 2015. He reached the semi-final after beating Ali Farag but then lost out to World #2 Grégory Gaultier. This victory pushed Hesham to his highest recorded world ranking of 13. Hesham then got injured in the World Championships against Ramy Ashour, which kept him out of squash for five weeks.

Hesham was the 10th seed for the 2022 PSA Men's World Squash Championship, where he reached the third round. He ended 2022 with a career high ranking at the time of world number 8. Also in 2022, he reached the semi-final of the British Open Squash Championships for the first time and repeated the success the following year during the 2023 Men's British Open Squash Championship.

In May 2023, he reached the quarter final of the 2023 PSA Men's World Squash Championship, where he lost to number 1 seed Mostafa Asal. In December 2023, he was part of the Egyptian team that secured the gold medal at the 2023 Men's World Team Squash Championships in New Zealand. The following year in 2024, he again reached the quarter final of the 2024 PSA Men's World Squash Championship and later in December won a second world team title at the 2024 Men's World Team Squash Championships in Hong Kong.
