= Omar Abdel Meguid =

Egyptian squash player (born 1988)

Personal information
- Born: February 23, 1988 (age 38) Giza, Egypt
- Height: 1.92 m (6 ft 4 in)
- Weight: 94 kg (207 lb)

Sport
- Country: Egypt
- Turned pro: 2006
- Retired: Active
- Racquet used: Harrow

Men's singles
- Highest ranking: No. 25 (November, 2014)
- Current ranking: No. 30 (July, 2015)
- Title: 9
- Tour final: 17
- Updated on July, 2015

Omar Abdel Meguid (Arabic: عُمَر عَبْد الْمَجِيد; born February 23, 1988, in Giza) is a professional squash player who represents Egypt. He joined the Professional Squash Association (PSA) and turned pro in 2005. He reached a career-high world ranking of World No. 25 in November 2014.
