= Stephen Coppinger =

Squash player (born 1984)

Personal information
- Born: 24 September 1984 (age 41) Dublin, Ireland
- Height: 1.90 m (6 ft 3 in)
- Weight: 86 kg (190 lb)

Sport
- Country: South Africa
- Turned pro: 2006
- Coached by: Rodney Durbach, David Palmer
- Retired: October 2017
- Racquet used: Salming

Men's singles
- Highest ranking: No. 14 (April 2015)
- Title: 8
- Tour final: 18
- World Open: QF (2014)
- Updated on June 2016

Stephen Coppinger (born 24 September 1984 in Dublin, Ireland) is a former professional squash player who represented South Africa. He grew up in Mombasa, Kenya and was educated at Hilton College. He reached a career-high world ranking of World No. 14 in April 2015.
