= Tarek Momen =

Egyptian squash player

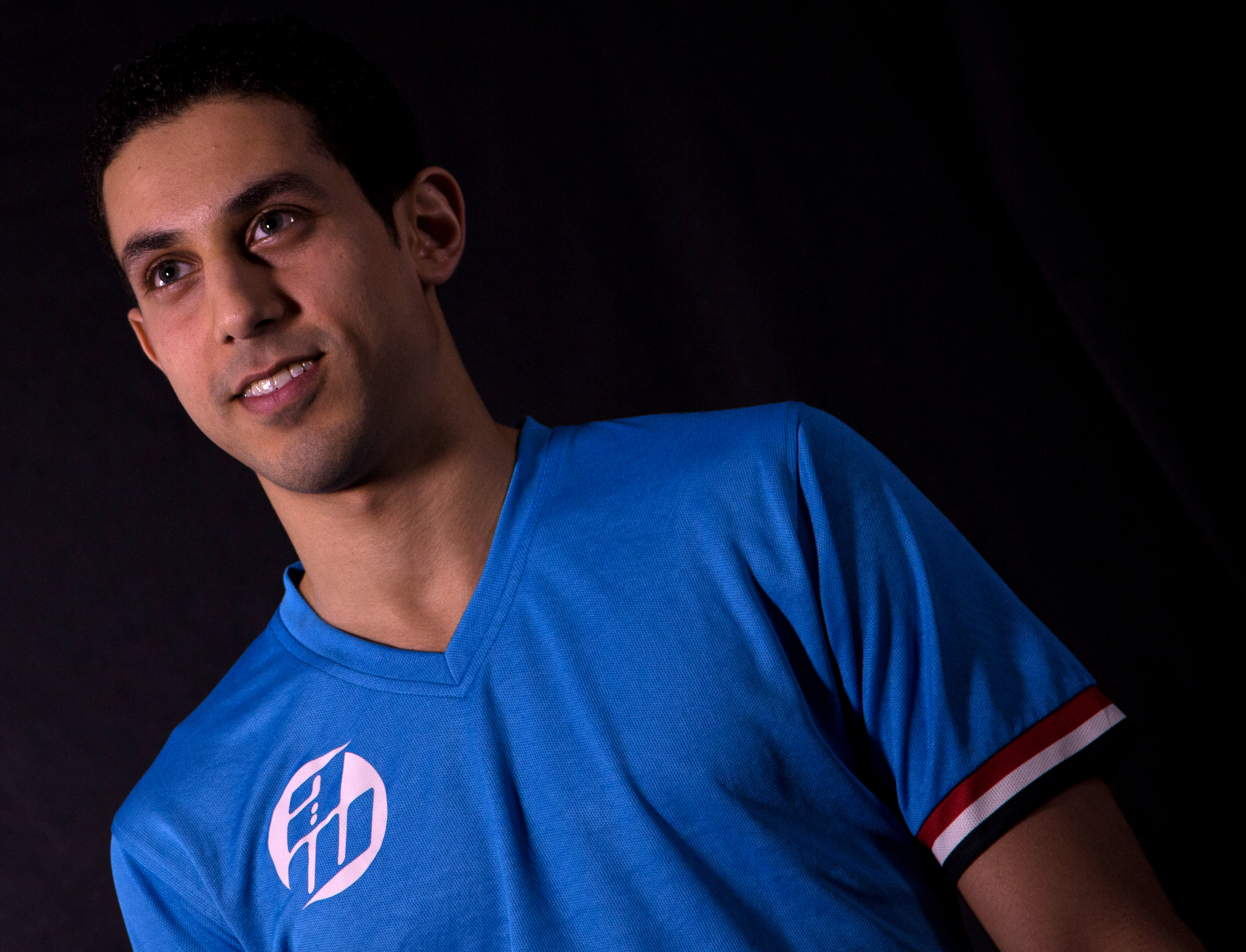
- Tarek Momen

Personal information
- Nicknames: The Viper, The Momenator
- Born: 23 February 1988 (age 38) Cairo, Egypt
- Height: 1.74 m (5 ft 9 in)
- Weight: 66 kg (146 lb)
- Website: Tarek Momen on X

Sport
- Country: Egypt
- Handedness: Right-handed
- Turned pro: 2005
- Coached by: Haitham Effat, Samir El Degwi
- Retired: 2025
- Racquet used: Harrow

Men's singles
- Highest ranking: No. 3 (February 2019)
- Title: 8
- Tour final: 27
- World Open: W (2019-20)
Medal record
Men's squash
Representing Egypt
World Championships
Bronze medal – third place	2015 Bellevue	Singles
Silver medal – second place	2018–19 Chicago	Singles
Gold medal – first place	2019–20 Doha	Singles
World Team Championships
Silver medal – second place	2013 Mulhouse	Team
Gold medal – first place	2019 Washington D.C.	Team
- Updated on July 2020

Tarek Momen (born 23 February 1988) is a professional former squash player representing Egypt. He is a former World Champion and reached a career-high world ranking of World No. 3 in February 2019.

== Career overview ==
A PSA member since 2005, Tarek Momen found time to graduate in Electronic Engineering at the American University in Cairo before devoting himself 100% to the Tour – and first breaking into the top 20 world rankings in August 2010, before celebrating a then career-high No 10 in April 2013.

The latest Egyptian to break into the world top ten, Momen reached his first Tour final at the Thessaloniki Open in Greece in March 2006 as a qualifier – upsetting No 2 seed Daryl Selby in the semi-finals before losing out to Spanish favourite Borja Golán in the final. It would be another five years before he would claim his maiden title, at the 2011 Irish Open in Dublin. Unseeded, Momen overcame No 2 seed Olli Tuominen, then third seed Saurav Ghosal before downing Australian favourite Stewart Boswell 12–10, 11–7, 8–11, 11–3 in the final.

Later in 2012, two significant titles came Momen's way: Firstly, seeded three in the Colombian Open, he ousted local hero Miguel Ángel Rodríguez in the final to win the PSA International 35 title in Bogota – then, unseeded, he carved his way through the Malaysian Open field in Selangor, dismissing Borja Golán in four games in the semi-finals before overcoming compatriot Mohamed El Shorbagy, the event's second seed, 12–10, 6–11, 12–10, 8–11, 14–12 in the 109-minute final. The PSA International 50 title marked the third and biggest of his career.

The Selangor success had extra significance for Momen as the women's title was won by compatriot Raneem El Weleily, the then world No. 2 who later became his wife. Momen's 2013 campaign began strongly with a surprise semi-final finish in the Swedish Open after a five-game upset over 4th seed Daryl Selby in the opening round. Last 16 round finishes in successive World Series events, the North American Open and PSA Kuwait Cup in March – coupled with a quarter-final berth in the KL Open, where he was unseeded – all led to his career-high No.10 ranking the following month. And the British Open in May saw the 25-year-old record his best ever performance in the event when he upset seventh seed Peter Barker to reach the quarter-finals.

Away from the Tour, Momen made his senior debut for Egypt in the World Team Championship in June in France, where he won all but one of his matches for the title-holders.

In May 2023, he reached the quarter final of the 2023 PSA Men's World Squash Championship, before losing to Mohamed El Shorbagy.

== Titles and Finals ==
=== Major Finals (7) ===
Major tournaments include:

- PSA World Championships
- PSA World Tour Finals
- Top-tier PSA World Tour tournaments (Platinum/World Series/Super Series)

Year/Season	Tournament	Opponent	Result	Score
2017	Qatar Classic	Mohamed El Shorbagy	Loss (1)	8-11 12-10 7-11 7–11
2018	Tournament of Champions	Simon Rösner	Loss (2)	8-11 9-11 11-6 5–11
2018-19	PSA World Championships	Ali Farag	Loss (3)	5-11 13-11 11-13 3–11
2019-20	PSA World Championships	Paul Coll	Win (1)	11-8 11-3 11–4
2020	Tournament of Champions	Mohamed El Shorbagy	Loss (4)	11-9 7-11 7-11 5–11
2020	Egyptian Open	Ali Farag	Loss (5)	9-11 3-11 4–11
2021	U.S. Open	Mostafa Asal	Loss (6)	11-5 11-5 9-11 10-12 3–11
