= Omar Mosaad =

Egyptian squash player

Personal information
- Full name: Omar Mosaad Abouzid
- Nickname: Hammer of Thor
- Born: March 17, 1988 (age 38) Cairo, Egypt
- Height: 6 ft 4 in (1.93 m)
- Weight: 90 kg (198 lb)

Sport
- Country: Egypt
- Handedness: Right Handed
- Turned pro: 2005
- Coached by: Mohamed Mosaad (Squash Coach) Iman El Amir (squash coach) and Ahmed Galal (physiotherapy)
- Retired: Sept 22, 2025
- Racquet used: Head Graphene XT Xenon 135 Slimbody

Men's singles
- Highest ranking: No. 3 (June, 2016)
- Current ranking: No. 47 (14 July 2025)
- Title: 10
- Tour final: 26
- World Open: F (2015)
Medal record
Men's squash
Representing Egypt
World Championships
Silver medal – second place	2015 Bellevue	Singles
World Team Championships
Silver medal – second place	2013 Mulhouse	Team
- Updated on July, 2016

Omar Mosaad Abouzid (born March 17, 1988) is a retired Egyptian professional squash player. He reached a career-high ranking of World No. 3 in 2016.

== Career overview ==
After a promising junior career in which he won U17 and U19 British Junior Open titles and reached the World Junior Championship final in 2006, Omar Mosaad quickly established his senior credentials by going on to win eight PSA World Tour titles from 20 final appearances - and celebrating a career-high world No. 3 ranking in June 2016.

After joining the PSA in 2005, the tall and imposing Cairo-based Egyptian reached his first Tour final the following year in Iran where he won the FAJR International in Tehran.

Success in 2008 earned him the PSA Young Player of the Year Award at the end of the year.

But Mosaad began to make his elite breakthrough in 2010: In his first two events of the year he picked up two Tour titles in the USA - firstly the new Kig Open in Los Angeles, then the Racquet Club Invitational in St Louis. By the end of the year, Mosaad had broken into the world top 20.

It was at the Kuala Lumpur Open in 2012 that Mosaad picked up the eighth – and biggest - title of his career. After despatching former champion and local hero Ong Beng Hee in the semis, the third-seeded Mosaad survived a 112-minute final over Adrian Grant, beating the experienced Englishman 11–6, 12–10, 12–14, 6–11, 11–8 to claim his first PSA International 50 title.

In November, he reached the biggest final of his career after a major breakthrough in the quarter-finals of the PSA International 70 Abierto Mexicano de Raquetas in Mexico, where he upset compatriot Karim Darwish, the No2 seed. Another five-game win over Germany's Simon Rösner took the unseeded Mosaad into the final, where he went down in straight games to France's Grégory Gaultier.

Mosaad made his long-awaited debut for Egypt in the 2013 World Team Championship in France – recording four wins out of four.

It was in the Colombian capital Bogotá later that Mosaad reached the 20th Tour final of his career. He denied local hero Miguel Ángel Rodríguez a place in the Colombian Open final after beating the former champion 3/0 in the semis, before going down to England's top seed Peter Barker.

In October 2013 "Hammer of Thor" won the Macau Open. He played the final against Adrian Grant and beat him 11–8, 4–11, 9–11, 11–9, 11–8. Taking with him another title. The talented Egyptian is unequivocal about his ambition: "I want to be world number one!"

He is 2015 World Open Squash Championship runner-up.

== Titles and Finals ==
=== Major Finals (2) ===
Major tournaments include:

- PSA World Championships
- PSA World Tour Finals
- Top-tier PSA World Tour tournaments (Platinum/World Series/Super Series)

Year/Season	Tournament	Opponent	Result	Score
2015	U.S. Open	Grégory Gaultier	Loss (1)	6-11 3-11 5–11
2015	PSA World Championships	Grégory Gaultier	Loss (2)	6-11 7-11 10–12

Sporting positions
Preceded by Ramy Ashour	PSA Young Player of the Year; 2008	Succeeded by Mohamed El Shorbagy
