= Miguel Ángel Rodríguez (squash player) =

Colombian squash player

Miguel Rodríguez
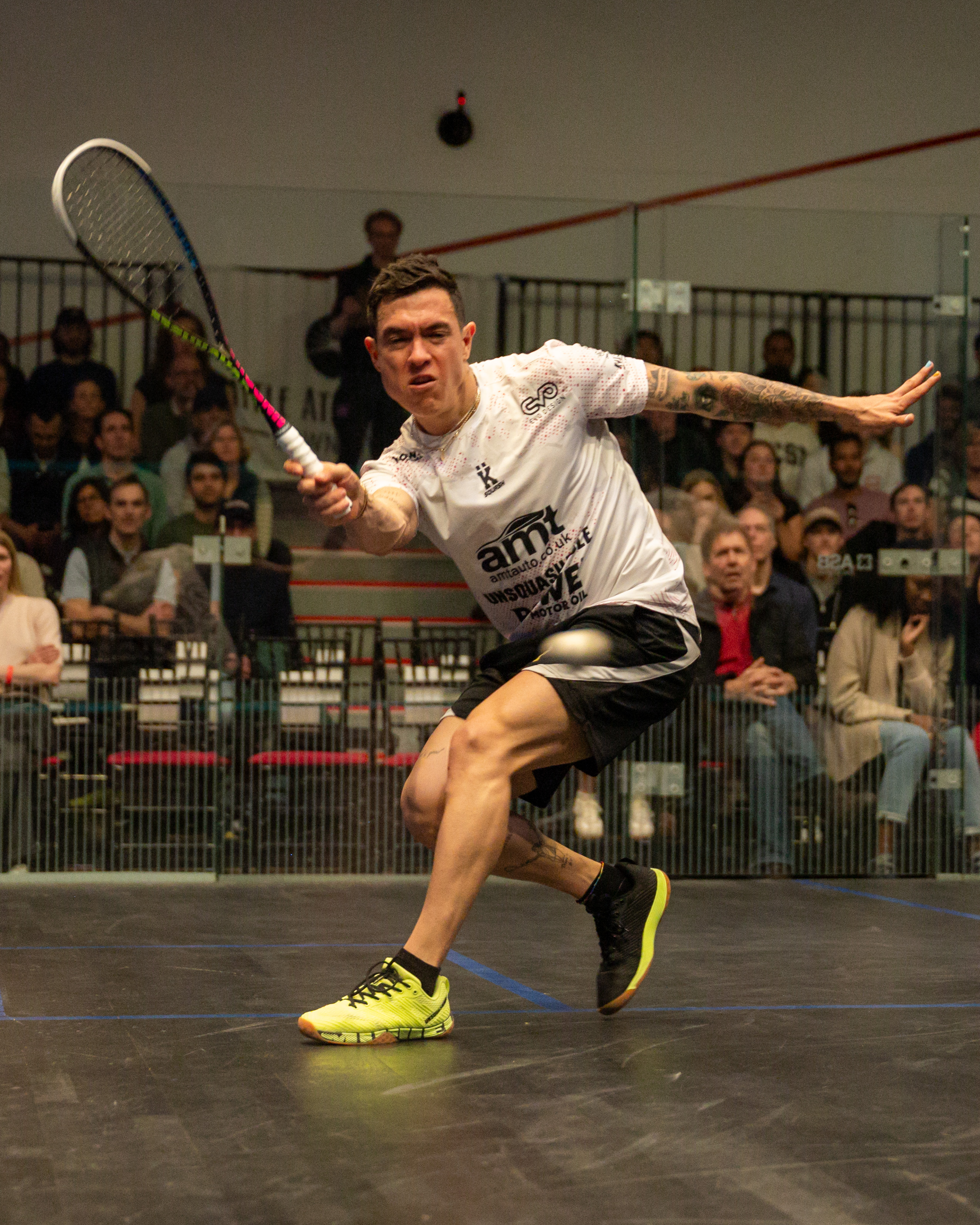
- Rodriguez at an exhibition match in 2025.

Personal information
- Full name: Miguel Ángel Rodríguez Forero
- Nickname: The Cannonball
- Born: 20 December 1985 (age 40) Bogotá, Colombia
- Height: 1.70 m (5 ft 7 in)
- Weight: 69 kg (152 lb)

Sport
- Country: Colombia
- Handedness: Right Handed
- Turned pro: 2005
- Coached by: Ángel Rodríguez, Sardar Ali Khan, David Palmer
- Retired: Active
- Racquet used: Tecnifibre Carboflex Cannonball

Men's singles
- Highest ranking: No. 4 (June 2015)
- Current ranking: No. 21 (27 August 2025)
- Title: 31
- Tour final: 43
- World Open: QF (2015, 2017, 2019)
- PSA Profile
Medal record
Representing Colombia
Men's squash
Event	1st	2nd	3rd
British Open	1	0	0
World Games	0	0	3
Pan American Games	5	3	2
Pan American Championships	10	2	4
CAC Games	4	8	4
South American Games	3	0	0
Total	23	13	13
British Open
Gold medal – first place	2018 Hull	Singles
World Games
Bronze medal – third place	2013 Cali	Singles
Bronze medal – third place	2022 Birmingham	Singles
Bronze medal – third place	2025 Chengdu	Singles
Pan American Games
Gold medal – first place	2007 Rio de Janeiro	Team
Gold medal – first place	2011 Guadalajara	Singles
Gold medal – first place	2015 Toronto	Singles
Gold medal – first place	2019 Lima	Mixed doubles
Gold medal – first place	2023 Santiago	Team
Silver medal – second place	2019 Lima	Singles
Silver medal – second place	2019 Lima	Team
Silver medal – second place	2023 Santiago	Singles
Bronze medal – third place	2007 Rio de Janeiro	Singles
Bronze medal – third place	2023 Santiago	Mixed doubles
Pan American Championships
Gold medal – first place	2012 Ambato	Singles
Gold medal – first place	2012 Ambato	Mixed doubles
Gold medal – first place	2013 Buenos Aires	Singles
Gold medal – first place	2013 Buenos Aires	Mixed doubles
Gold medal – first place	2014 Toluca	Singles
Gold medal – first place	2014 Toluca	Mixed doubles
Gold medal – first place	2018 George Town	Mixed doubles
Gold medal – first place	2022 Guatemala City	Mixed doubles
Gold medal – first place	2022 Guatemala City	Team
Gold medal – first place	2023 Cartagena	Team
Silver medal – second place	2018 George Town	Team
Silver medal – second place	2023 Cartagena	Mixed doubles
Bronze medal – third place	2017 Buenos Aires	Team
Bronze medal – third place	2023 Cartagena	Singles
Bronze medal – third place	2026 Asunción	Singles
Bronze medal – third place	2026 Asunción	Team
Central American and Caribbean Games
Gold medal – first place	2010 Mayagüez	Singles
Gold medal – first place	2014 Veracruz	Singles
Gold medal – first place	2018 Barranquilla	Singles
Gold medal – first place	2026 Santo Domingo	Team
Silver medal – second place	2006 Cartagena	Team
Silver medal – second place	2010 Mayagüez	Doubles
Silver medal – second place	2010 Mayagüez	Team
Silver medal – second place	2014 Veracruz	Team
Silver medal – second place	2018 Barranquilla	Mixed doubles
Silver medal – second place	2018 Barranquilla	Team
Silver medal – second place	2026 Santo Domingo	Singles
Silver medal – second place	2026 Santo Domingo	Mixed doubles
Bronze medal – third place	2006 Cartagena	Singles
Bronze medal – third place	2006 Cartagena	Doubles
Bronze medal – third place	2010 Mayagüez	Mixed doubles
Bronze medal – third place	2014 Veracruz	Mixed doubles
South American Games
Gold medal – first place	2010 Medellín	Singles
Gold medal – first place	2010 Medellín	Mixed doubles
Gold medal – first place	2010 Medellín	Team
- Updated on August 2025

Miguel Ángel Rodríguez Forero (born 20 December 1985, in Bogotá), known as Miguel Rodríguez, is a professional male squash player who represents Colombia. He reached a career-high world ranking of World No. 4 in June 2015.

== Early life ==
Rodríguez was born in Bogotá, Colombia. He was introduced to squash at the age of 2 by his father Ángel, a former professional squash player himself. He played primarily at the Club El Nogal in Bógota. Miguel attended the school Calasanz, where he also played football and table tennis. His most significant achievement as a junior was winning the US Junior Open and the Canadian Junior Open in Boys' Under-19 for 2 consecutive seasons (2003 and 2004). Rodríguez then started his professional squash career, and won his first PSA World Tour title in November 2005 at the age of 19.

== Career overview ==
Rodríguez won the Colombian Open twice, in 2008 and 2010, and was runner-up in 2006 and 2012. Rodriguez won the Pan American Games in 2015

In September, he became the highest-ranked South American of all time, exceeding then Federico Usandizaga of Argentina.

In 2013, he won the Bluenose Classic in Halifax, Canada in March and was bronze medalist at the World Games in Cali. He also won gold in the men's singles at the 2015 Pan American Games in Toronto.

On 20 May 2018, he won the 2018 British Open Squash Championships in Hull, England, beating Egypt's Mohamed El Shorbagy in a 5-game thriller to become the first-ever man from Colombia, and more broadly South America, to win the coveted British Open title. Rodríguez is known to wear different colored shoes when on court.

== Titles and Finals ==
=== Major Finals (1) ===
Major tournaments include:

- PSA World Championships
- PSA World Tour Finals
- Top-tier PSA World Tour tournaments (Platinum/World Series/Super Series)

Year/Season	Tournament	Opponent	Result	Score
2018	British Open	Mohamed El Shorbagy	Win (1)	11-7 6-11 8-11 11-2 11–9
