= 2014 in squash sport =

This article lists the results for the sport of Squash in 2014.

== 2014 PSA World Series ==
- January 17–24: Tournament of Champions 2014 in (United States) New York City
  - (Egypt) Amr Shabana defeated (France) Grégory Gaultier 11–8, 11–3, 11–4.
- February 26 – March 3: Windy City Open 2014 in (United States) Richmond, Virginia
  - (France) Grégory Gaultier defeated (Egypt) Ramy Ashour 11–7, 11–3, 11–4.
- April 13 – 18: El Gouna International 2014 in Egypt
  - (Egypt) Ramy Ashour defeated (Egypt) Mohamed El Shorbagy 11–7, 12–10, 8–11, 11–8.
- May 12 – 18: 2014 Men's British Open in (United Kingdom) Kingston upon Hull
  - (France) Grégory Gaultier defeated (England) Nick Matthew 11–3, 11–6, 11–2.
- August 26 – 31: Men's Hong Kong squash Open 2014 in Hong Kong
  - (Egypt) Mohamed El Shorbagy defeated (France) Grégory Gaultier 11–9, 11–2, 4–11, 8–11, 11–4.
- October 13 – 18: US Open in (United States) Philadelphia
  - (Egypt) Mohamed El Shorbagy defeated fellow Egyptian, Amr Shabana, 8–11, 11–9, 11–3, 11–3.
- November 14 – 21: 2014 Men's World Open Squash Championship in (Qatar) Doha
  - (Egypt) Ramy Ashour defeated fellow Egyptian, Mohamed El Shorbagy, 13–11, 7–11, 5–11, 11–5, 14–12, to claim his third World Open Squash title.

== 2014 WSA World Series ==
- March 14 – 21: 2013 Women's World Open Squash Championship in (Malaysia) Penang
  - (England) Laura Massaro defeated (Egypt) Nour El Sherbini 11–7, 6–11, 11–9, 5–11, 11–9.
- May 11 – 18: 2014 Women's British Open Squash Championship in (United Kingdom) Kingston upon Hull
  - (Malaysia) Nicol David defeated (England) Laura Massaro 8–11, 11–5, 11–7, 11–8.
- August 18 – 23: Women's Malaysian Open Squash Championships 2014 in (Malaysia) Kuala Lumpur
  - (Egypt) Raneem El Weleily defeated fellow Egyptian, Nour El Tayeb, 7–11, 11–3, 12–10, 2–11, 11–7.
- August 27 – 31: Women's Hong Kong squash Open 2014 in Hong Kong
  - (Malaysia) Nicol David defeated (Egypt) Nour El Tayeb 11–4, 12–10, 11–8.
- October 13 – 18: US Open in (United States) Philadelphia
  - (Malaysia) Nicol David defeated (Egypt) Nour El Sherbini 11–5, 12–10, 12–10.
- December 15 – 20: 2014 Women's World Open Squash Championship in (Egypt) Cairo
  - (Malaysia) Nicol David defeated (Egypt) Raneem El Weleily 5–11, 11–8, 7–11, 14–12, 11–5, to claim her eighth World Open Squash title.

== Other squash events ==
- December 1 – 6: 2014 Women's World Team Squash Championships in (Canada) Niagara-on-the-Lake
  - Champions: England (seventh Women's World Team Squash Championships title); Second: Malaysia; Third: Egypt
