= 2014 PSA World Tour =

PSA World Tour 2014

Details
- Event name: PSA World Tour 2014
- Tournaments: 137
- Categories: PSA World Championship; PSA World Series (6); PSA International (23); PSA Challenger (108)
- Website www.psaworldtour.com

Achievements
- World Number 1: (France) Grégory Gaultier (8 months) (England) Nick Matthew (3 months) (Egypt) Mohd El Shorbagy (2 months)
- World Champion: (Egypt) Ramy Ashour

Awards
- Player of the year: (Egypt) Ramy Ashour
- Young player of the year: (Egypt) Fares Dessouky

The PSA World Tour 2014 is the international squash tour organised circuit organized by the Professional Squash Association (PSA) for the 2014 squash season. The most important tournament in the series is the World Championship held in Doha in Qatar. The tour features three categories of regular events, World Series, which feature the highest prize money and the best fields, International and Challenger.

== 2014 Calendar ==
=== Key ===
World Championship
World Series Platinum
World Series Gold
International 70
International 50

==== January ====
Tournament	Date	Champion	Runner-Up	Semifinalists	Quarterfinalists
Tournament of Champions 2014 (United States) New York City, United States; World Series Gold $115,000 - Draw	17–24 January 2014	(Egypt) Amr Shabana; 11–8, 11–3, 11–4	(France) Grégory Gaultier	(Egypt) Mohamed El Shorbagy (England) James Willstrop	(England) Nick Matthew (England) Peter Barker (England) Daryl Selby (Germany) Simon Rösner
Motor City Open 2014 (United States) Detroit, United States; International 70 $70,000 - Draw	25–28 January 2014	(Egypt) Mohamed El Shorbagy; 8–11, 12–14, 11–4, 11–6, 11–7	(England) Peter Barker	(Egypt) Amr Shabana (Australia) Cameron Pilley	(Egypt) Karim Darwish (Egypt) Omar Mosaad (Colombia) Miguel Á. Rodríguez (Finland) Olli Tuominen
Pittsburgh Open 2014 (United States) Pittsburgh, United States; International 25 $25,000	31 January - 3 February 2014	(Egypt) Karim Abdel Gawad; 5–11, 11–7, 11–4, 13–11	(Botswana) Alister Walker	(Switzerland) Nicolas Müller (Finland) Olli Tuominen	(Australia) Ryan Cuskelly (Malaysia) Mohd Nafiizwan Adnan (Mexico) César Salazar (Malaysia) Muhd Asyraf Azan

==== February ====
Tournament	Date	Champion	Runner-Up	Semifinalists	Quarterfinalists
Swedish Open 2014 (Sweden) Linköping, Sweden; International 70 $70,000 - Draw	6–9 February 2014	(England) Nick Matthew; 11–13, 11–6, 11–8, 6–11, 11–4	(Egypt) Ramy Ashour	(France) Grégory Gaultier (Egypt) Amr Shabana	(Spain) Borja Golán (England) Peter Barker (England) Daryl Selby (Egypt) Omar Mosaad
Metro Squash Windy City Open 2014 (United States) Chicago, United States; World Series Gold $115,000 - Draw	26 February - 3 March 2014	(France) Grégory Gaultier; 11–7, 11–3, 11–4	(Egypt) Ramy Ashour	(England) Nick Matthew (Egypt) Mohamed El Shorbagy	(England) James Willstrop (England) Peter Barker (Germany) Simon Rösner (India) Saurav Ghosal

==== March ====
Tournament	Date	Champion	Runner-Up	Semifinalists	Quarterfinalists
Canary Wharf Squash Classic 2014 (England) London, England; International 50 $50,000 - Draw	24–28 March 2014	(England) Nick Matthew; 11–5, 11–5, 11–5	(England) James Willstrop	(England) Peter Barker (Colombia) Miguel Ángel Rodríguez	(England) Daryl Selby (Germany) Simon Rösner (Egypt) Omar Mosaad (Hong Kong) Max Lee

==== April ====
Tournament	Date	Champion	Runner-Up	Semifinalists	Quarterfinalists
Northern Ontario Championships 2014 (Canada) Sudbury, Canada; International 25 $25,000	2–5 April 2014	(South Africa) Stephen Coppinger; 11–6, 13–11, 11–4	(Egypt) Marwan El Shorbagy	(England) Adrian Grant (England) Joe Lee	(England) Tom Richards (Australia) Ryan Cuskelly (New Zealand) Campbell Grayson (Peru) Diego Elías
El Gouna International 2014 (Egypt) El Gouna, Egypt; World Series Gold $115,000 - Draw	13–18 April 2014	(Egypt) Ramy Ashour; 11–7, 12–10, 8–11, 11–8	(Egypt) Mohamed El Shorbagy	(France) Grégory Gaultier (Egypt) Amr Shabana	(Egypt) Karim Darwish (England) Peter Barker (England) Daryl Selby (Egypt) Omar Mosaad
Grasshopper Cup 2014 (Switzerland) Zürich, Switzerland; International 50 $50,000 - Draw	23–27 April 2014	(Egypt) Amr Shabana; 11–6, 11–9, 4–11, 8–11, 11–8	(Egypt) Tarek Momen	(England) James Willstrop (Spain) Borja Golán	(England) Daryl Selby (Germany) Simon Rösner (Egypt) Omar Mosaad (Egypt) Mohamed Abouelghar

==== May ====
Tournament	Date	Champion	Runner-Up	Semifinalists	Quarterfinalists
British Open 2014 (England) Hull, England; World Series Platinum $150,000 - Draw	12–18 May 2014	(France) Grégory Gaultier; 11–3, 11–6, 11–2	(England) Nick Matthew	(Egypt) Ramy Ashour (Egypt) Mohamed El Shorbagy	(England) James Willstrop (Egypt) Amr Shabana (France) Mathieu Castagnet (Egypt) Fares Dessouky
Hong Kong FC International 2014; Hong Kong, China; International 25 $25,000	21–24 May 2014	(Hong Kong) Max Lee; 11–3, 10–12, 8–11, 11–5, 11–6	(Malaysia) Ong Beng Hee	(England) Adrian Grant (Hong Kong) Leo Au	(Botswana) Alister Walker (Malaysia) Mohd Nafiizwan Adnan (Egypt) Mazen Hesham (Finland) Henrik Mustonen
Torneo Internacional PSA Sporta 2014; Guatemala City, Guatemala; International 25 $25,000	29 May - 1 June 2014	(Egypt) Marwan El Shorbagy; 11–7, 11–8, 11–7	(Canada) Shawn Delierre	(United States) Chris Gordon (Mexico) Alfredo Ávila	(New Zealand) Campbell Grayson (Mexico) César Salazar (England) Jaymie Haycocks (Malaysia) Muhd Asyraf Azan

==== July ====
Tournament	Date	Champion	Runner-Up	Semifinalists	Quarterfinalists
CCI PSA International Championship 2014 (India) Mumbai, India; International 25 $25,000	3–6 July 2014	(Egypt) Ali Farag; 11–7, 7–11, 5–11, 11–1, 11–9	(Pakistan) Nasir Iqbal	(Egypt) Zahed Mohamed (India) Mahesh Mangaonkar	(Malaysia) Ong Beng Hee (England) Jaymie Haycocks (Denmark) Kristian Frost Olesen (India) Harinder Pal Sandhu

==== August ====
Tournament	Date	Champion	Runner-Up	Semifinalists	Quarterfinalists
Colombian Open 2014 (Colombia) Bogotá, Colombia; International 50 $50,000 - Draw	6–9 August 2014	(Colombia) Miguel Ángel Rodríguez; 9–11, 11–7, 11–7, 11–1	(Egypt) Omar Mosaad	(Germany) Simon Rösner (Egypt) Marwan El Shorbagy	(Switzerland) Nicolas Müller (Egypt) Omar Abdel Meguid (Egypt) Mazen Hesham (Finland) Henrik Mustonen
Malaysian Open 2014 (Malaysia) Kuala Lumpur, Malaysia; International 50 $50,000 - Draw	20–23 August 2014	(Egypt) Mohamed El Shorbagy; 11–9, 11–5, 11–7	(Hong Kong) Max Lee	(Spain) Borja Golán (Egypt) Tarek Momen	(Egypt) Karim Abdel Gawad (Finland) Olli Tuominen (Malaysia) Mohd Nafiizwan Adnan (India) Mahesh Mangaonkar
Hong Kong Open 2014; Hong Kong, China; World Series Platinum $150,000 - Draw	26–31 August 2014	(Egypt) Mohamed El Shorbagy; 11–9, 11–2, 4–11, 8–11, 11–4	(France) Grégory Gaultier	(Spain) Borja Golán (Egypt) Tarek Momen	(England) Peter Barker (England) Daryl Selby (Germany) Simon Rösner (Switzerland) Nicolas Müller

==== September ====
Tournament	Date	Champion	Runner-Up	Semifinalists	Quarterfinalists
China Open 2014; Shanghai, China; International 70 $70,000 - Draw	4–7 September 2014	(England) James Willstrop; 11–7, 11–7, 9–11, 10–12, 11–5	(England) Peter Barker	(Egypt) Omar Mosaad (Netherlands) Laurens Jan Anjema	(Spain) Borja Golán (England) Daryl Selby (Egypt) Marwan El Shorbagy (Egypt) Karim Abdel Gawad
Abierto Mexicano de Raquetas 2014 (Mexico) Huixquilucan, Mexico; International 70 $70,000 - Draw	18–21 September 2014	(Egypt) Mohamed El Shorbagy; 11–3, 11–3, 11–2	(Egypt) Marwan El Shorbagy	(Egypt) Omar Mosaad (Mexico) César Salazar	(Germany) Simon Rösner (Colombia) Miguel Á. Rodríguez (France) Mathieu Castagnet (Peru) Diego Elías
Charlottesville Open 2014 (United States) Charlottesville, United States; International 25 $25,000	18–21 September 2014	(Botswana) Alister Walker; 6–11, 11–3, 16–14, 11–6	(France) Lucas Serme	(England) Tom Richards (Egypt) Karim Ali Fathi	(England) Adrian Grant (England) Chris Simpson (New Zealand) Campbell Grayson (England) Declan James
Netsuite Open 2014 (United States) San Francisco, United States; International 70 $70,000 - Draw	26–30 September 2014	(France) Grégory Gaultier; 11–3, 11–5, 11–5	(Egypt) Amr Shabana	(England) Peter Barker (Colombia) Miguel Ángel Rodríguez	(Netherlands) Laurens Jan Anjema (England) Adrian Grant (England) Chris Simpson (Botswana) Alister Walker

==== October ====
Tournament	Date	Champion	Runner-Up	Semifinalists	Quarterfinalists
US Open 2014 (United States) Philadelphia, United States; World Series Gold $115,000 - Draw	13–18 October 2014	(Egypt) Mohamed El Shorbagy; 8–11, 11–9, 11–3, 11–3	(Egypt) Amr Shabana	(France) Grégory Gaultier (England) Nick Matthew	(Germany) Simon Rösner (Egypt) Omar Mosaad (England) Adrian Waller (Egypt) Fares Dessouky
CAS International 2014 (Pakistan) Islamabad, Pakistan; International 25 $25,000	20–23 October 2014	(Egypt) Omar Abdel Meguid; 6–11, 6–11, 11–4, 11–5, 13–11	(Pakistan) Aamir Atlas Khan	(Pakistan) Danish Atlas Khan (Qatar) Abdulla Al-Tamimi	(Pakistan) Nasir Iqbal (Pakistan) Farhan Zaman (Pakistan) Amaad Fareed (Pakistan) Abbas Shoukat
Montréal Open 2014 (Canada) Montreal, Canada; International 35 $35,000	21–24 October 2014	(France) Mathieu Castagnet; 11–7, 12–10, 9–11, 13–11	(Colombia) Miguel Ángel Rodríguez	(Spain) Borja Golán (Australia) Cameron Pilley	(England) Daryl Selby (France) Grégoire Marche (Scotland) Alan Clyne (Peru) Diego Elías
Macau Open 2014; Macau, China; International 50 $50,000 - Draw	23–26 October 2014	(Egypt) Tarek Momen; 6–11, 11–5, 11–7, 4–11, 12–10	(Egypt) Omar Mosaad	(Egypt) Mazen Hesham (Malaysia) Ong Beng Hee	(India) Saurav Ghosal (Egypt) Marwan El Shorbagy (Hong Kong) Max Lee (Malaysia) Mohd Nafiizwan Adnan
Bluenose Classic 2014 (Canada) Halifax, Canada; International 50 $50,000 - Draw	27 October – 1 November 2014	(England) Peter Barker; 11–6, 11–7, 11–8	(Colombia) Miguel Ángel Rodríguez	(Spain) Borja Golán (England) Daryl Selby	(Australia) Cameron Pilley (South Africa) Stephen Coppinger (Botswana) Alister Walker (England) Tom Richards

==== November ====
Tournament	Date	Champion	Runner-Up	Semifinalists	Quarterfinalists
Lagos International 2014 (Nigeria) Lagos, Nigeria; International 25 $25,000	5–8 November 2014	(England) Adrian Grant; 11–9, 11–6, 11–2	(Egypt) Karim Ali Fathi	(Egypt) Omar Abdel Meguid (Pakistan) Farhan Zaman	(Pakistan) Danish Atlas Khan (Wales) Peter Creed (Nigeria) Babatunde Ajagbe (Nigeria) Adewale Amao
PSA World Championship 2014 (Qatar) Doha, Qatar; World Championship $325,000 - Draw	14–21 November 2014	(Egypt) Ramy Ashour; 13–11, 7–11, 5–11, 11–5, 14–12	(Egypt) Mohamed El Shorbagy	(France) Grégory Gaultier (England) Nick Matthew	(Egypt) Amr Shabana (Spain) Borja Golán (Australia) Cameron Pilley (South Africa) Stephen Coppinger
Dubai Squash Cup 2014 (United Arab Emirates) Dubai, United Arab Emirates; International 25 $25,000	23–27 November 2014	(Egypt) Karim Abdel Gawad; 5–11, 11–6, 11–8, 6–11, 11–4	(England) Chris Simpson	(Pakistan) Nasir Iqbal (Pakistan) Aamir Atlas Khan	(Egypt) Mohamed Abouelghar (Egypt) Zahed Mohamed (Malaysia) Muhd Asyraf Azan (New Zealand) Paul Coll
Edmonton Open 2014 (Canada) Edmonton, Canada; International 35 $35,000	27- 30 November 2014	(Germany) Simon Rösner; 11–8, 4–11, 7–11, 13–11, 11–6	(Egypt) Tarek Momen	(Switzerland) Nicolas Müller (England) Adrian Waller	(England) Tom Richards (Finland) Henrik Mustonen (England) Eddie Charlton (Australia) Rex Hedrick

==== December ====
Tournament	Date	Champion	Runner-Up	Semifinalists	Quarterfinalists
British Grand Prix 2014 (England) Manchester, England; International 70 $70,000 - Draw	5–8 December 2014	(England) Nick Matthew; 11–7, 11–6, 11–5	(France) Mathieu Castagnet	(France) Grégory Gaultier (Colombia) Miguel Ángel Rodríguez	(Egypt) Mohamed El Shorbagy (England) Peter Barker (England) Daryl Selby (England) Adrian Waller

== Year end world top 10 players ==
Rank	2014	
1	(Egypt) Mohamed El Shorbagy	1,385.000
2	(France) Grégory Gaultier	1,322.000
3	(England) Nick Matthew	970.500
4	(Egypt) Amr Shabana	878.500
5	(Egypt) Ramy Ashour	872.500
6	(England) Peter Barker	573.500
7	(Spain) Borja Golán	570.909
8	(England) James Willstrop	532.500
9	(Egypt) Tarek Momen	504.545
10	(Germany) Simon Rösner	484.091

== Retirements ==
Following is a list of notable players (winners of a main tour title, and/or part of the PSA World Rankings top 30 for at least one month) who announced their retirement from professional squash, became inactive, or were permanently banned from playing, during the 2014 season:

- Karim Darwish (born 29 August 1981 in the Cairo, Egypt) joined the pro tour in 1999, reached the world no. 1 ranking in January 2009. Keeping the spot for eleven month in 2009. He reached the final of the World Open in 2008, lost against Ramy Ashour. The Egyptian also won two Qatar Classic titles in 2008 and 2010, one Sky Open title in 2009, one El Gouna International title in 2010 and the Saudi International in 2008. After competing a last time the Hong Kong Open, he retired in October .
- Hisham Mohd Ashour (born 29 May 1982 in Cairo, Egypt) joined the pro tour in 2000, reached the singles no. 11 spot in February 2012. He won 2 PSA World Tour titles including the National Bank Financial Group Open in Montréal in Canada in 2010. He retired during the 2014 season after competing a last time in the Florida State Open in 2013.

== See also ==
- Professional Squash Association (PSA)
- PSA World Series 2014
- PSA World Rankings
- PSA World Series Finals
- PSA World Open
- WSA World Tour 2014
