= Colombian Open (squash) 2014 =

Colombian Open 2014
- 17th Colombian Open

Details
- Event name: XVII Abierto Colombiano de Squash Club El Nogal 2014
- Location: Bogotá, Colombia
- Venue: Club El Nogal
- Website www.abiertocolombianopsa.com

Men's Winner
- Category: International 50
- Prize money: $50,000
- Year: World Tour 2014

The Colombian Open 2014 is the men's edition of the 2014 Colombian Open, which is a tournament of the PSA World Tour event International (prize money: 50 000 $). The event took place in Bogotá in Colombia from 6 to 9 August. Miguel Ángel Rodríguez won his third Colombian Open trophy, beating Omar Mosaad in the final.

== Prize money and ranking points ==
For 2014, the prize purse was $50,000. The prize money and points breakdown is as follows:

Prize Money Colombian Open (2014)
| Event | W | F | SF | QF | 1R |
| Points (PSA) | 875 | 575 | 350 | 215 | 125 |
| Prize money | $8,550 | $5,850 | $3,825 | $2,360 | $1,350 |

== Seeds ==
1. (Germany) Simon Rösner (Semifinals)
2. (Egypt) Omar Mosaad (Final)
3. (Colombia) Miguel Ángel Rodríguez (Champion)
4. (Egypt) Marwan El Shorbagy (Semifinals)
5. (Switzerland) Nicolas Müller (Quarterfinals)
6. (Egypt) Omar Abdel Meguid (Quarterfinals)
7. (Egypt) Mazen Hesham Ga Sabry (Quarterfinals)
8. (Finland) Henrik Mustonen (Quarterfinals)

== Draw and results ==
First round
1 | (Germany) Simon Rösner | 11 | 11 | 11
Q | (Malaysia) Muhd Asyraf Azan | 3 | 6 | 2
WC | (Colombia) Juan Alej. Cardona | 4 | 3 | 1
7 | (Egypt) Mazen Hesham | 11 | 11 | 11
6 | (Egypt) Omar Abdel Meguid | 11 | 12 | 7 | 11
Q | (Germany) Raphael Kandra | 9 | 10 | 11 | 9
(Mexico) César Salazar | 13 | 7 | 9
3 | (Colombia) Miguel Á. Rodríguez | 11 | 11 | 11 | 11
4 | (Egypt) Marwan El Shorbagy | 11 | 11 | 11
(England) Jaymie Haycocks | 7 | 5 | 4
Q | (United States) Christopher Gordon | 11 | 6 | 5 | 8
5 | (Switzerland) Nicolas Müller | 9 | 11 | 11 | 11
8 | (Finland) Henrik Mustonen | 11 | 11 | 11
Q | (England) Jonathan Maloney | 7 | 5 | 8
(Egypt) Mohamed Abouelghar | 6 | 11 | 11 | 7 | 7
2 | (Egypt) Omar Mosaad | 11 | 6 | 4 | 11 | 11

Quarter finals
1 | (Germany) Simon Rösner | 8 | 11 | 11 | 3 | 11
7 | (Egypt) Mazen Hesham | 11 | 6 | 8 | 11 | 6
6 | (Egypt) Omar Abdel Meguid | 10 | 8 | 7
3 | (Colombia) Miguel Á. Rodríguez | 12 | 11 | 11
4 | (Egypt) Marwan El Shorbagy | 11 | 11 | 11
5 | (Switzerland) Nicolas Müller | 7 | 4 | 8
8 | (Finland) Henrik Mustonen | 7 | 6 | 2
2 | (Egypt) Omar Mosaad | 11 | 11 | 11

Semi finals
1 | (Germany) Simon Rösner | 8 | 6 | 5
3 | (Colombia) Miguel Á. Rodríguez | 11 | 11 | 11
4 | (Egypt) Marwan El Shorbagy | 4 | 11 | 11 | 5 | 7
2 | (Egypt) Omar Mosaad | 11 | 7 | 6 | 11 | 11

Final
3 | (Colombia) Miguel Á. Rodríguez | 9 | 11 | 11 | 11
2 | (Egypt) Omar Mosaad | 11 | 7 | 7 | 1

== See also ==
- PSA World Tour 2014
- Colombian Open
