= 2018–19 PSA World Tour Finals =

2018–19 PSA World Tour

Details
- Event name: 2018–19 PSA World Tour Finals
- Location: Cairo
- Venue: Mall of Arabia
- Website; PSA World Tour standings
- Year: 2018–19 PSA World Tour

The 2018–19 PSA World Tour is a series of men's and women's squash tournaments which are part of the Professional Squash Association (PSA) PSA World Tour from August 2018 until July 2019. The PSA World Tour tournaments are some of the most prestigious events on the men's and women's tour. The best-performing players in the World Tour events qualify for the annual 2019 Men's PSA World Tour Finals and 2019 Women's PSA World Tour Finals tournament.

Starting in August 2018, PSA replaced World Series tournaments with new PSA World Tour, comprising four new tournament-tiers: Platinum ($164,500–$180,500), Gold ($100,000–$120,500), Silver ($70,000–$88,000) and Bronze ($51,000–$53,000) each one awarding different points.

== PSA World Tour Ranking Points ==
PSA World Tour events also have a separate World Tour ranking. Points for this are calculated on a cumulative basis after each World Tour event. The top eight players at the end of the calendar year are then eligible to play in the PSA World Tour Finals.

Ranking points vary according to tournament tier being awarded as follows:

Tournament			Ranking Points
Rank	Prize Money US$	Ranking Points	Winner	Runner up	3/4	5/8	9/16	17/32	33/48
World Championship	$500,000	25045 points	3175	2090	1270	780	475	290	177.5
Platinum	$164,500–$180,500	19188 points	2750	1810	1100	675	410	250	152.5
Gold	$100,000–$120,500	10660 points	1750	1150	700	430	260	160
Silver	$75,000–$88,000	7470 points	1225	805	490	300	182.5	112.5
Bronze	$47,500–$55,000	5330 points	875	575	350	215	130	80

== Men's ==
=== Tournaments ===
Tournament	Country	Location	Rank	Prize money	Date	2018–19 Winner
J.P. Morgan China Squash Open	China	Shanghai	Gold	$120,500	5–9 September 2018	(Egypt) Mohamed Abouelghar
Oracle Netsuite Open	United States	San Francisco	Gold	$118,000	27 Sep.–2 Oct. 2018	(Egypt) Ali Farag
FS Investments U.S. Open	United States	Philadelphia	Platinum	$169,000	6–13 October 2018	(Egypt) Mohamed El Shorbagy
Channel VAS Championships	England	Weybridge	Gold	$106,000	16–21 October 2018	(Egypt) Tarek Momen
Qatar Classic	Qatar	Doha	Platinum	$177,750	27 Oct.–2 Nov. 2018	(Egypt) Ali Farag
QSF N.1	Qatar	Doha	Bronze	$51,000	10–14 November 2018	(England) Daryl Selby
Everbright Sun Hung Kai Hong Kong Open	Hong Kong	Hong Kong	Platinum	$164,500	19–25 November 2018	(Egypt) Mohamed El Shorbagy
Golootlo Pakistan Open	Pakistan	Karachi	Bronze	$53,000	28 Nov.–2 Dec. 2018	(Egypt) Karim Abdel Gawad
Black Ball Squash Open	Egypt	New Cairo	Platinum	$180,500	3–9 December 2018	(Egypt) Karim Abdel Gawad
CCI International	India	Mumbai	Silver	$77,800	8–12 January 2019	(Egypt) Tarek Momen
J.P. Morgan Tournament of Champions	United States	New York City	Platinum	$180,000	16–24 January 2019	(Egypt) Ali Farag
The Suburban Collection Motor City Open	United States	Detroit	Silver	$75,000	29 Jan.–2 Feb. 2019	(Egypt) Mohamed Abouelghar
Three Rivers Capital Pittsburgh Open	United States	Pittsburgh	Bronze	$52,000	6–10 February 2019	(France) Grégoire Marche
PSA World Championships	United States	Chicago	W.C.	$500,000	23 Feb.–2 Mar. 2019	(Egypt) Ali Farag
Troilus Canada Cup	Canada	Toronto	Silver	$81,500	3–7 March 2019	(Peru) Diego Elías
Citigold Canary Wharf Classic	England	London	Gold	$109,000	10–15 March 2019	(New Zealand) Paul Coll
Grasshopper Cup	Switzerland	Zürich	Gold	$110,000	26–31 March 2019	(Egypt) Mohamed El Shorbagy
DPD Open	Netherlands	Eindhoven	Gold	$100,000	9–14 April 2019	(Egypt) Ali Farag
Macau Open	Macau	Macau	Bronze	$47,500	10–14 April 2019	(Peru) Diego Elías
El Gouna International	Egypt	El Gouna	Platinum	$165,000	17–26 April 2019	(Egypt) Ali Farag
The Wimbledon Club Squared Open	England	London	Bronze	$51,250	11–16 May 2019	(Egypt) Marwan El Shorbagy
British Open	England	Hull	Platinum	$165,000	20–26 May 2019	(Egypt) Mohamed El Shorbagy
XII Torneo Internacional PSA Sporta	Guatemala	Guatemala City	Bronze	$47,500	28 May–2 Jun. 2019	(Colombia) Miguel Ángel Rodríguez

=== Standings ===
World Championship
177.5	1st Round	290	2nd Round
475	3rd Round	780	Quarterfinalist
1270	Semifinalist	2090	Runner-up
**3175**	Winner		

Platinum
152.5	1st Round	250	2nd Round
410	3rd Round	675	Quarterfinalist
1100	Semifinalist	1810	Runner-up
**2750**	Winner		

Gold
160	1st Round	260	2nd Round
430	Quarterfinalist	700	Semifinalist
1150	Runner-up	**1750**	Winner

Silver
112.5	1st Round	182.5	2nd Round
300	Quarterfinalist	490	Semifinalist
805	Runner-up	**1225**	Winner

Bronze
80	1st Round	130	2nd Round
215	Quarterfinalist	350	Semifinalist
575	Runner-up	**875**	Winner

Top 16 Men's PSA World Tour Standings 2018–19
Rank	Player	Tournaments Played	CHN (China)	USA (United States)	USA (United States)	ENG (England)	QAT (Qatar)	QAT (Qatar)	HKG (Hong Kong)	PAK (Pakistan)	EGY (Egypt)	IND (India)	USA (United States)	USA (United States)	USA (United States)	USA (United States)	CAN (Canada)	ENG (England)	SUI (Switzerland)	NED (Netherlands)	MAC (Macau)	EGY (Egypt)	ENG (England)	ENG (England)	GUA (Guatemala)	Total Points
1	(Egypt) **Ali Farag***	12	–	**1750**	1100	1150	**2750**	–	1810	–	1810	–	**2750**	–	–	**3175**	–	–	430	**1750**	–	**2750**	–	1810	–	23035
2	(Egypt) **Mohamed El Shorbagy***	13	–	1150	**2750**	260	675	–	**2750**	–	675	–	1810	–	–	1270	–	700	**1750**	1150	–	675	–	**2750**	–	18365
3	(Egypt) **Tarek Momen**	12	–	430	675	**1750**	1100	–	1100	–	1100	**1225**	1100	–	–	2090	–	1150	1150	–	–	1100	–	–	–	13970
4	(Egypt) **Karim Abdel Gawad***	13	–	700	410	700	675	–	675	**875**	**2750**	–	1100	–	–	177.5	–	–	700	700	–	1810	–	1100	–	12372.5
5	(New Zealand) **Paul Coll**	13	1150	–	1100	430	675	–	675	–	1100	–	675	–	–	780	805	**1750**	–	430	–	675	–	1100	–	11345
6	(Germany) **Simon Rösner**	13	700	430	1810	–	1810	–	1100	–	675	–	675	–	–	1270	–	260	430	700	–	675	–	675	–	11210
7	(Peru) **Diego Elías**	15	–	430	250	700	1100	–	410	575	410	–	675	805	–	177.5	**1225**	–	–	–	**875**	410	–	250	575	8867.5
8	(Egypt) **Mohamed Abouelghar**	13	**1750**	–	675	–	250	–	675	–	675	–	250	**1225**	–	475	490	–	700	260	–	250	–	675	–	8350
9	(Colombia) Miguel Ángel Rodríguez	14	260	430	675	–	250	–	675	–	250	–	250	300	–	780	–	–	430	430	–	410	–	675	**875**	6690
10	(India) Saurav Ghosal	14	700	260	410	430	410	–	250	–	675	300	410	–	–	780	–	–	430	–	215	410	–	250	–	5930
11	(Egypt) Omar Mosaad	15	260	–	410	260	250	575	250	–	410	182.5	675	300	–	177.5	–	–	–	–	575	410	130	410	–	5275
12	(Egypt) Marwan El Shorbagy	10	–	–	–	–	–	–	–	–	–	182.5	250	490	–	780	490	260	–	430	–	675	**875**	410	–	4842.5
13	(Wales) Joel Makin	13	430	160	410	430	675	–	250	–	–	–	250	–	–	475	–	430	260	260	–	410	–	250	–	4690
14	(England) Tom Richards	15	260	–	250	430	410	–	410	–	250	182.5	250	–	–	290	300	260	–	160	–	250	130	250	–	4082.5
15	(France) Grégoire Marche	13	–	260	152.5	–	152.5	–	250	–	410	–	410	–	**875**	290	–	160	160	260	–	250	–	410	–	4040
16	(Egypt) Fares Dessouky	7	–	–	–	–	–	–	–	–	–	805	410	–	–	475	–	430	–	–	–	1100	130	410	–	3760

Bold – Players qualified for the final
(*) – Winners of Platinum's tournaments automatically qualifies for Finals.

Final tournament	Country	Location	Prize money	Date	2018–19 World Tour Champion
PSA World Tour Finals 2019	Egypt	Cairo	$160,000	9–14 June 2019	(Egypt) Karim Abdel Gawad

== Women's ==
=== Tournaments ===
Tournament	Country	Location	Rank	Prize money	Date	2018–19 Winner
J.P. Morgan China Squash Open	China	Shanghai	Gold	$120,500	5–9 September 2018	(Egypt) Raneem El Weleily
Oracle Netsuite Open	United States	San Francisco	Silver	$88,000	27 Sep.–2 Oct. 2018	(England) Sarah-Jane Perry
FS Investments U.S. Open	United States	Philadelphia	Platinum	$169,000	6–13 October 2018	(Egypt) Raneem El Weleily
Carol Weymuller Open	United States	New York City	Bronze	$51,250	17–22 October 2018	(Egypt) Nour El Tayeb
Everbright Sun Hung Kai Hong Kong Open	Hong Kong	Hong Kong	Platinum	$164,500	19–25 November 2018	(New Zealand) Joelle King
J.P. Morgan Tournament of Champions	United States	New York City	Platinum	$180,000	16–24 January 2019	(Egypt) Nour El Sherbini
Cleveland Classic	United States	Cleveland	Bronze	$51,250	31 Jan.–4 Feb. 2019	(Egypt) Nour El Tayeb
PSA World Championships	United States	Chicago	W.C.	$500,000	23 Feb.–2 Mar. 2019	(Egypt) Nour El Sherbini
CIB Black Ball Squash Open	Egypt	New Cairo	Gold	$107,000	11–15 March 2019	(Egypt) Raneem El Weleily
J Warren Young Memorial Texas Open	United States	Dallas	Bronze	$55,000	26–31 March 2019	(United States) Amanda Sobhy
DPD Open	Netherlands	Eindhoven	Gold	$100,000	9–14 April 2019	(Egypt) Raneem El Weleily
Macau Open	Macau	Macau	Bronze	$47,500	10–14 April 2019	(Hong Kong) Annie Au
El Gouna International	Egypt	El Gouna	Platinum	$176,000	17–26 April 2019	(Egypt) Raneem El Weleily
Manchester Open	England	Manchester	Silver	$76,000	9–13 May 2019	(New Zealand) Joelle King
British Open	England	Hull	Platinum	$177,000	20–26 May 2019	(Egypt) Nouran Gohar

=== Standings ===
World Championship
177.5	1st Round	290	2nd Round
475	3rd Round	780	Quarterfinalist
1270	Semifinalist	2090	Runner-up
**3175**	Winner		

Platinum
152.5	1st Round	250	2nd Round
410	3rd Round	675	Quarterfinalist
1100	Semifinalist	1810	Runner-up
**2750**	Winner		

Gold
160	1st Round	260	2nd Round
430	Quarterfinalist	700	Semifinalist
1150	Runner-up	**1750**	Winner

Silver
112.5	1st Round	182.5	2nd Round
300	Quarterfinalist	490	Semifinalist
805	Runner-up	**1225**	Winner

Bronze
80	1st Round	130	2nd Round
215	Quarterfinalist	350	Semifinalist
575	Runner-up	**875**	Winner

Top 16 Women's World Tour Standings 2018–19
Rank	Player	Tournaments Played	CHN (China)	USA (United States)	USA (United States)	USA (United States)	HKG (Hong Kong)	USA (United States)	USA (United States)	USA (United States)	EGY (Egypt)	USA (United States)	NED (Netherlands)	MAC (Macau)	EGY (Egypt)	ENG (England)	ENG (England)	Total Points
1	(Egypt) **Raneem El Weleily***	10	**1750**	805	**2750**	–	1810	1810	–	1270	**1750**	–	**1750**	–	**2750**	–	675	17120
2	(Egypt) **Nour El Sherbini***	9	700	–	1810	–	675	**2750**	–	**3175**	1150	–	1150	–	675	–	675	12760
3	(Egypt) **Nour El Tayeb**	12	700	–	410	**875**	675	1100	**875**	2090	260	–	700	–	675	490	1100	9950
4	(France) **Camille Serme**	10	1150	300	1100	–	675	675	–	1270	430	–	700	–	1100	–	1810	9210
5	(New Zealand) **Joelle King***	10	260	300	410	–	**2750**	1100	–	780	700	–	–	–	675	**1225**	675	8875
6	(Egypt) **Nouran Gohar**	9	430	–	250	–	1100	675	–	780	700	–	–	–	1810	300	**2750**	8795
7	(England) **Sarah-Jane Perry**	12	430	**1225**	675	575	1100	–	–	475	260	215	430	–	675	300	1100	7460
8	(Wales) **Tesni Evans**	13	260	–	1100	215	410	410	575	780	260	130	430	–	410	805	410	6195
9	(United States) Amanda Sobhy	11	–	182.5	675	215	410	410	–	475	–	**875**	430	–	1100	490	410	5672.5
10	(England) Alison Waters	13	260	300	410	350	410	675	350	475	260	–	260	–	250	300	410	4710
11	(England) Laura Massaro	11	260	490	675	–	250	410	–	475	430	–	430	–	410	300	250	4380
12	(Hong Kong) Annie Au	9	–	490	410	–	250	410	–	780	160	–	–	**875**	410	–	410	4195
13	(Egypt) Salma Hany	12	260	182.5	410	350	250	675	–	290	260	–	–	130	410	182.5	250	3650
14	(India) Joshna Chinappa	10	430	–	410	215	410	410	–	290	430	–	–	350	250	–	410	3605
15	(England) Victoria Lust	10	260	–	250	130	410	410	350	475	–	575	–	–	250	–	410	3520
16	(Malaysia) Nicol David	11	430	300	410	–	250	410	–	475	160	–	260	–	250	182.5	250	3377.5

Bold – Players qualified for the final
(*) – Winners of Platinum's tournaments automatically qualifies for Finals.

Final tournament	Country	Location	Prize money	Date	2018–19 World Tour Champion
PSA World Tour Finals 2019	Egypt	Cairo	$160,000	9–14 June 2019	(Egypt) Raneem El Weleily

== See also ==
- 2018–19 PSA World Tour
- Official Men's Squash World Ranking
- Official Women's Squash World Ranking
