= Bluenose Squash Classic 2014 =

- 9th Bluenose Squash Classic

Details
- Event name: Bluenose Squash Classic 2014
- Location: Halifax, Canada
- Website www.squashsite.co.uk/2009/bluenose2014.htm

Men's Winner
- Category: International 50
- Prize money: $50,000
- Year: World Tour 2014

The Bluenose Squash Classic 2014 is the 2014's Bluenose Classic, which is a tournament of the PSA World Tour. The event took place in Halifax in Canada from 29 October to 1 November. Peter Barker won his first Bluenose Squash Classic trophy, beating Miguel Ángel Rodríguez in the final.

== Prize money and ranking points ==
For 2014, the prize purse was $50,000. The prize money and points breakdown is as follows:

Prize Money Bluenose Squash Classic (2014)
Event	W	F	SF	QF	1R
Points (PSA)	875	575	350	215	125
Prize money	$8,075	$5,525	$3,615	$2,230	$1,275

== Seeds ==
1. (Spain) Borja Golán (semifinals)
2. (England) Peter Barker (champion)
3. (England) Daryl Selby (semifinals)
4. (Colombia) Miguel Ángel Rodríguez (final)
5. (Australia) Cameron Pilley (quarterfinals)
6. (South Africa) Stephen Coppinger (quarterfinals)
7. (England) Adrian Waller (quarterfinals)
8. (Botswana) Alister Walker (first round)

== Draw and results ==
First round
1	(Spain) Borja Golán	11	11	11
(Egypt) Mohamed Abouelghar	2	9	7
(England) Tom Richards	11	11	11
7	(England) Adrian Waller	9	8	9
6	(South Africa) Stephen Coppinger	11	11	11	11
Q	(Australia) Ryan Cuskelly	6	13	9	5
(Scotland) Alan Clyne	11	8	10
4	(Colombia) Miguel Á. Rodríguez	13	11	12
3	(England) Daryl Selby	11	11	11
Q	(United States) Christopher Gordon	6	7	9
WC	(Canada) Andrew Schnell	10	6	7
8	(Botswana) Alister Walker	12	11	11
5	(Australia) Cameron Pilley	11	11	11
Q	(Peru) Diego Elías	9	4	5
Q	(Netherlands) Sebastiaan Weenink	4	6	8
2	(England) Peter Barker	11	11	11

Quarter finals
1	(Spain) Borja Golán	12	11	11	11
(England) Tom Richards	14	7	8	2
6	(South Africa) Stephen Coppinger	11	4	8	11	5
4	(Colombia) Miguel Á. Rodríguez	5	11	11	7	11
3	(England) Daryl Selby	13	6	11	8	11
8	(Botswana) Alister Walker	11	11	7	11	5
5	(Australia) Cameron Pilley	6	7	11	9
2	(England) Peter Barker	11	11	9	11

Semi finals
1	(Spain) Borja Golán	4	10	11
4	(Colombia) Miguel Á. Rodríguez	11	12	13
3	(England) Daryl Selby	4	4	6
2	(England) Peter Barker	11	11	11

Final
4	(Colombia) Miguel Á. Rodríguez	6	7	8
2	(England) Peter Barker	11	11	11

== See also ==
- PSA World Tour 2014
- Bluenose Classic
