= Men's Malaysian Open Squash Championships 2014 =

Malaysian Open 2014

Details
- Event name: Malaysian Open Squash Championships 2014
- Location: Kuala Lumpur Malaysia
- Venue: National Squash Centre; Nu Sentral Mall
- Website www.squashsite.co.uk/2009/malaysian2014.htm

Men's Winner
- Category: International 50
- Prize money: $50,000
- Year: World Tour 2014

The Men's Malaysian Open Squash Championships 2014 is the men's edition of the 2014 Malaysian Open Squash Championships, which is a tournament of the PSA World Tour event International (prize money: $50,000). The event took place in Kuala Lumpur in Malaysia from 20 August to 23 August. Mohamed El Shorbagy won his first Malaysian Open trophy, beating Max Lee in the final.

== Prize money and ranking points ==
For 2014, the prize purse was $50,000. The prize money and points breakdown is as follows:

Prize money Malaysian Open (2014)
Event	W	F	SF	QF	1R
Points (PSA)	875	575	350	215	125
Prize money	$8,075	$5,525	$3,615	$2,230	$1,275

== Seeds ==
1. (Egypt) Mohamed El Shorbagy (champion)
2. (Spain) Borja Golán (semifinals)
3. (Egypt) Tarek Momen (semifinals)
4. (Egypt) Karim Abdel Gawad (quarterfinals)
5. (Hong Kong) Max Lee (final)
6. (Malaysia) Ong Beng Hee (first round)
7. (Finland) Olli Tuominen (quarterfinals)
8. (Malaysia) Mohd Nafiizwan Adnan (quarterfinals)

== Draw and results ==
First round
1	(Egypt) Mohd El Shorbagy	11	11	11
(Kuwait) Abdullah Al Muzayen	4	3	3
Q	(Malaysia) Mohd Azlan Iskandar	11	10	11	rtd
8	(Malaysia) Mohd Nafi. Adnan	8	12	5
6	(Malaysia) Ong Beng Hee	8	11	10	12	10
Q	(India) Mahesh Mangaonkar	11	7	12	10	12
Q	(France) Lucas Serme	10	7	11	6
3	(Egypt) Tarek Momen	12	11	9	11
4	(Egypt) Karim Abdel Gawad	14	11	10	13
(Hong Kong) Leo Au	12	5	12	11
Q	(Australia) Rex Hedrick	9	7	9
5	(Hong Kong) Max Lee	11	11	11
7	(Finland) Olli Tuominen	11	11	12	7	11
WC	(Malaysia) Ivan Yuen	7	13	10	11	3
(Egypt) Mohamed Abouelghar	11	7	4	13
2	(Spain) Borja Golán	5	11	11	15

Quarter finals
1	(Egypt) Mohd El Shorbagy	11	11	11
8	(Malaysia) Mohd Nafiizwan Adnan	5	9	3
Q	(India) Mahesh Mangaonkar	7	11	8	11	6
3	(Egypt) Tarek Momen	11	5	11	2	11
4	(Egypt) Karim Abdel Gawad	13	12	6	11	8
5	(Hong Kong) Max Lee	15	10	11	6	11
7	(Finland) Olli Tuominen	6	2	11	1
2	(Spain) Borja Golán	11	11	9	11

Semi finals
1	(Egypt) Mohd El Shorbagy	11	11	11
3	(Egypt) Tarek Momen	7	7	7
5	(Hong Kong) Max Lee	7	11	11	11
2	(Spain) Borja Golán	11	7	8	7

Final
1	(Egypt) Mohd El Shorbagy	11	11	11
5	(Hong Kong) Max Lee	6	7	9

== See also ==
- Malaysian Open Squash Championships
- Women's Malaysian Open Squash Championships 2014
