= Grasshopper Cup 2014 =

- 26th Grasshopper Cup

Details
- Event name: Grasshopper Cup 2014
- Location: Zürich, Switzerland
- Venue: EWZ-Unterwerk Selnau
- Website gc-cup.com

Men's Winner
- Category: World Tour International 50
- Prize money: $50,000
- Year: World Tour 2014

The Grasshopper Cup 2014 is the 2014's Grasshopper Cup, which is a tournament of the PSA World Tour event International (Prize money : $50 000 ). The event took place at the EWZ-Unterwerk Selnau in Zürich in Switzerland from 23 to 27 April. Amr Shabana won his first Grasshopper Cup trophy, beating Tarek Momen in the final.

== Prize money and ranking points ==
For 2014, the prize purse was $50,000. The prize money and points breakdown is as follows:

Prize Money Grasshopper Cup (2014)
Event	W	F	SF	QF	1R
Points (PSA)	875	575	350	215	125
Prize money	$8,075	$5,525	$3,615	$2,230	$1,275

== Seeds ==
1. (England) James Willstrop (semifinals)
2. (Spain) Borja Golán (semifinals)
3. (Egypt) Amr Shabana (champion)
4. (England) Daryl Selby (quarterfinals)
5. (Germany) Simon Rösner (quarterfinals)
6. (Egypt) Tarek Momen (final)
7. (Egypt) Omar Mosaad (quarterfinals)
8. (Australia) Cameron Pilley (first round)

== Draw and results ==
1* 2* First round 3* 4*
1	(England) James Willstrop	11	11	11
(Finland) Olli Tuominen	4	6	6
(Switzerland) Nicolas Müller	11	9	11	7	7
5	(Germany) Simon Rösner	9	11	2	11	11
6	(Egypt) Tarek Momen	11	12	11
Q	(Denmark) Kristian Frost Olesen	5	10	8
WC	(Switzerland) Reiko Peter	7	8	8
4	(England) Daryl Selby	11	11	11
3	(Egypt) Amr Shabana	11	11	11
(Botswana) Alister Walker	5	9	6
Q	(Egypt) Mohd Abouelghar	11	8	13	11
8	(Australia) Cameron Pilley	7	11	11	6
7	(Egypt) Omar Mosaad	11	5	11	11
Q	(Egypt) Mohd Ali Anwar Reda	4	11	7	3
Q	(Finland) Henrik Mustonen	7	7	5
2	(Spain) Borja Golán	11	11	11

1* Quarter finals 2*
1	(England) James Willstrop	11	11	11
5	(Germany) Simon Rösner	8	8	6
6	(Egypt) Tarek Momen	11	11	12	11
4	(England) Daryl Selby	3	4	14	5
3	(Egypt) Amr Shabana	14	11	11
Q	(Egypt) Mohd Abouelghar	12	4	8
7	(Egypt) Omar Mosaad	12	11	10	9
2	(Spain) Borja Golán	14	8	12	11

Semi finals
1	(England) James Willstrop	6	11	6	11	9
6	(Egypt) Tarek Momen *	11	1	11	8	11
3	(Egypt) Amr Shabana *	11	13	12
2	(Spain) Borja Golán	3	11	10

Final
6	(Egypt) Tarek Momen	6	9	11	11	8
3	(Egypt) Amr Shabana *	11	11	4	8	11

== See also ==
- PSA World Tour 2014
- Grasshopper Cup
