= Dubai Open =

Dubai Open may refer to:

- Dubai Open (golf) – a 2014 Asian Tour event
- Dubai Tennis Championships – a tennis tournament
- Dubai Open Chess Tournament – an annual chess tournament
- Dubai Open Squash – a Professional Squash Association tournament
- Dubai Open Cube – an annual event held by the World Cube Association
