= Mexican Open =

Mexican Open may refer to:

- Mexican Open (golf), the national golf tournament held in various locales in Mexico
- Mexican Open (tennis), the national tennis tournament held in Acapulco, Mexico
- Mexican Open (badminton)
- Mexican Open (squash)
