= 2014 China Open =

2014 China Open may refer to:

- 2014 China Open (snooker), a snooker tournament
- 2014 China Open (tennis), a tennis tournament
- 2014 China Open Super Series Premier, an edition of the China Open badminton tournament

== See also ==
- Men's China Squash Open 2014
- Women's China Squash Open 2014
