= Men's Macau Open 2014 =

Macau Open 2013
- 9th PSA Macau Open

Details
- Event name: Macau Open 2014
- Location: Macau China
- Website www.squashsite.co.uk/2009/macau2014.htm

Men's Winner
- Category: International 50
- Prize money: $50,000
- Year: World Tour 2014

The Men's Macau Open 2014 is the men's edition of the 2014 Macau Open, which is a tournament of the PSA World Tour event International (Prize money: $50,000). The event took place in Macau in China from 23 October to 26 October. Tarek Momen won his first Macau Open trophy, beating Omar Mosaad in the final.

== Prize money and ranking points ==
For 2014, the prize purse was $50,000. The prize money and points breakdown was as follows:

Prize Money Macau Open (2014)
Event	W	F	SF	QF	1R
Points (PSA)	875	575	350	215	125
Prize money	$8,075	$5,525	$3,615	$2,230	$1,275

== Seeds ==
1. (Egypt) Tarek Momen (Champion)
2. (Egypt) Omar Mosaad (Final)
3. (India) Saurav Ghosal (Quarterfinals)
4. (Egypt) Marwan El Shorbagy (Quarterfinals)
5. (Hong Kong) Max Lee (Quarterfinals)
6. (Egypt) Mazen Hesham (Semifinals)
7. (Malaysia) Ong Beng Hee (Semifinals)
8. (Malaysia) Mohd Nafiizwan Adnan (Quarterfinals)

== Draw and results ==
First round
1	(Egypt) Tarek Momen	11	11	11
Q	(England) Jaymie Haycocks	9	9	8
(Egypt) Zahed Mohamed	15	7	6
5	(Hong Kong) Max Lee	17	11	11
6	(Egypt) Mazen Hesham	11	11	7	11
(Hong Kong) Leo Au	6	9	11	8
WC	(Macau) Steven Liu	2	3	12
3	(India) Saurav Ghosal	11	11	14
4	(Egypt) Marwan El Shorbagy	11	11	11
(South Africa) Shaun Le Roux	5	7	8
Q	(England) Eddie Charlton	4	11	7	9
7	(Malaysia) Ong Beng Hee	11	5	11	11
8	(Malaysia) Mohd Nafi. Adnan	13	10	11	14
Q	(Hong Kong) Tsz Fung Yip	11	12	4	12
Q	(Australia) Matthew Karwalski	7	7	8
2	(Egypt) Omar Mosaad	11	11	11

Quarter finals
1	(Egypt) Tarek Momen	11	10	7	13	11
5	(Hong Kong) Max Lee	1	12	11	11	7
6	(Egypt) Mazen Hesham	5	11	7	11	13
3	(India) Saurav Ghosal	11	7	11	7	11
4	(Egypt) Marwan El Shorbagy	9	10	11	12	5
7	(Malaysia) Ong Beng Hee	11	12	8	10	11
8	(Malaysia) Mohd Nafiizwan Adnan	15	2	4
2	(Egypt) Omar Mosaad	17	11	11

Semi finals
1	(Egypt) Tarek Momen	11	11	11
6	(Egypt) Mazen Hesham	7	8	9
7	(Malaysia) Ong Beng Hee	8	10	8
2	(Egypt) Omar Mosaad	11	12	11

Final
1	(Egypt) Tarek Momen	6	11	11	4	12
2	(Egypt) Omar Mosaad	11	5	7	11	10

== See also ==
- PSA World Tour 2014
- Women's Macau Open 2014
- Macau Open (squash)
