= 2014 Canary Wharf Squash Classic =

Canary Wharf Squash Classic 2014
- 11th Canary Wharf Squash Classic

Details
- Event name: Canary Wharf Squash Classic 2014
- Location: London, England, United Kingdom
- Venue: East Wintergarden
- Website www.cwsquash.com

Men's Winner
- Category: World Tour International 50
- Prize money: $50,000
- Year: World Tour 2014

The Canary Wharf Squash Classic 2014 is the 2014's Canary Wharf Squash Classic, which is a tournament of the PSA World Tour event International (Prize money : 50 000 $). The event took place at the East Wintergarden in London in England from 24 March to 28 March. Nick Matthew won his fourth Canary Wharf Squash Classic trophy, beating James Willstrop in the final.

== Prize money and ranking points ==
For 2014, the prize purse was $50,000. The prize money and points breakdown is as follows:

Prize Money Canary Wharf Squash Classic (2014)
Event	W	F	SF	QF	1R
Points (PSA)	875	575	350	215	125
Prize money	$8,075	$5,525	$3,615	$2,230	$1,275

== Seeds ==
1. (England) Nick Matthew (champion)
2. (England) James Willstrop (final)
3. (England) Peter Barker (semifinals)
4. (Egypt) Karim Darwish (first round)
5. (England) Daryl Selby (quarterfinals)
6. (Germany) Simon Rösner (quarterfinals)
7. (Egypt) Omar Mosaad (quarterfinals)
8. (Colombia) Miguel Ángel Rodríguez (semifinals)

== Draw and results ==
1* 2* First round 3* 4*
1	(England) Nick Matthew	11	11	11
WC	(Scotland) Alan Clyne	6	7	5
(Egypt) Karim Abdel Gawad	6	11	12	9
7	(Egypt) Omar Mosaad	11	5	14	11
8	(Colombia) Miguel Á. Rodríguez	11	5	11	7	11
(England) Adrian Grant	7	11	5	11	8
Q	(Hong Kong) Max Lee	11	13	19
4	(Egypt) Karim Darwish	8	11	17
3	(England) Peter Barker	11	11	11
(India) Saurav Ghosal	5	3	4
Q	(Egypt) Mohd Ali Anwar Reda	5	5	9
6	(Germany) Simon Rösner	11	11	11
5	(England) Daryl Selby	5	14	11	11	11
Q	(England) Jonathan Kemp	11	16	8	8	6
Q	(England) Adrian Waller	5	6	4
2	(England) James Willstrop	11	11	11

1* Quarter finals 2*
1	(England) Nick Matthew	11	11	11
7	(Egypt) Omar Mosaad	5	9	8
8	(Colombia) Miguel Á. Rodríguez	11	7	11	12
Q	(Hong Kong) Max Lee	9	11	6	10
3	(England) Peter Barker	8	11	11	13
6	(Germany) Simon Rösner	11	8	4	11
5	(England) Daryl Selby	3	4	6
2	(England) James Willstrop	11	11	11

Semi finals
1	(England) Nick Matthew *	11	11	11
8	(Colombia) Miguel Á. Rodríguez	4	2	9
3	(England) Peter Barker	10	2	7
2	(England) James Willstrop *	12	11	11

Final
1	(England) Nick Matthew *	11	11	11
2	(England) James Willstrop	5	5	5

== See also ==
- PSA World Tour 2014
- Canary Wharf Squash Classic
- 2014 Men's British Open
