= Grasshopper Cup 2016 =

- 28th Grasshopper Cup

Details
- Event name: Grasshopper Cup 2016
- Location: Zürich, Switzerland
- Venue: EWZ-Unterwerk Selnau
- Website www.gc-cup.com/nc/en/

Men's Winner
- Category: World Tour International 70
- Prize money: $70,000
- Year: World Tour 2016

The Grasshopper Cup 2016 was the 2016 Grasshopper Cup, which is a tournament of the PSA World Tour event International (Prize money: 70 000 $). The event took place in Zürich in Switzerland from 13 to 17 April. Marwan El Shorbagy won his first Grasshopper Cup trophy, beating Grégory Gaultier in the final.

== Prize money and ranking points ==
For 2016, the prize purse was $70,000. The prize money and points breakdown is as follows:

Prize Money Grasshopper Cup (2016)
Event	W	F	SF	QF	1R
Points (PSA)	1225	805	490	300	175
Prize money	$11,875	$8,125	$5,315	$3,280	$1,875

== Seeds ==
1. (France) Grégory Gaultier (final)
2. (Germany) Simon Rösner (semifinals)
3. (France) Mathieu Castagnet (first round)
4. (Egypt) Marwan El Shorbagy (champion)
5. (Australia) Cameron Pilley (quarterfinals)
6. (England) James Willstrop (first round)
7. (Egypt) Ali Farag (semifinals)
8. (Australia) Ryan Cuskelly (first round)

== Draw and results ==
First round
1	(France) Grégory Gaultier	11	9	11	11
Q	(Malaysia) Mohd Nafiizwan Adnan	8	11	9	5
WC	(Switzerland) Nicolas Müller	10	11	9	11	11
8	(Australia) Ryan Cuskelly	12	8	11	8	7
7	(Egypt) Ali Farag	11	11	11
(Hong Kong) Leo Au	8	6	5
(England) Chris Simpson	14	11	11
3	(France) Mathieu Castagnet	12	9	9
4	(Egypt) Marwan El Shorbagy	11	11	11
Q	(Scotland) Alan Clyne	8	9	5
Q	(England) Adrian Waller	11	11	8	2	6
5	(Australia) Cameron Pilley	6	7	11	11	11
6	(England) James Willstrop	8	6	7
(France) Grégoire Marche	11	11	11
Q	(New Zealand) Paul Coll	8	9	5
2	(Germany) Simon Rösner	11	11	11

Quarter finals
1	(France) Grégory Gaultier	11	11	11
WC	(Switzerland) Nicolas Müller	4	2	7
7	(Egypt) Ali Farag	9	11	11	11
(England) Chris Simpson	11	6	7	5
4	(Egypt) Marwan El Shorbagy	11	11	11
5	(Australia) Cameron Pilley	9	8	7
(France) Grégoire Marche	11	6	9	14
2	(Germany) Simon Rösner	9	11	11	16

Semi finals
1	(France) Grégory Gaultier	11	11	5	12
7	(Egypt) Ali Farag	5	8	11	10
4	(Egypt) Marwan El Shorbagy	15	11	11
2	(Germany) Simon Rösner	13	7	5

Final
1	(France) Grégory Gaultier	11	11	9	11	6
4	(Egypt) Marwan El Shorbagy	6	13	11	9	11

== See also ==
- 2016 PSA World Tour
- Grasshopper Cup
