= 2019 Women's PSA World Tour Finals =

PSA World Tour Finals
- 1st Women's PSA World Tour Finals
- Location: Cairo, Egypt
- Venue: Mall of Arabia
- Date: 9–14 June 2019
- Website worldtourfinals.com
- Prize money: $160,000

Results
- Champion: Raneem El Weleily (EGY)
- Runner-up: Camille Serme (FRA)
- Semi-finalists: Nour El Tayeb (EGY); Nouran Gohar (EGY)

The 2019 CIB Women's PSA World Series Finals was the first women's edition of the PSA World Tour Finals (Prize money : $160,000) after the renaming of PSA World Series. The top 8 players in the 2018–19 PSA World Tour qualified for the event. The event took place at Mall of Arabia, Cairo in Egypt from 9–14 June 2019.

It was the first edition under the PSA World Tour Finals label after the PSA renamed PSA World Series to current PSA World Tour Finals. CIB sponsored the event.

Egyptian Raneem El Weleily won its first PSA Finals title after defeating unexpected French finalist Camille Serme 3–2 in the Final. El Weleily went 2–0 down, but managed to turn it around to win 3–2.

== PSA World Ranking Points ==
PSA also awards points towards World Ranking. Points are awarded as follows:

| PSA World Tour Finals | | Ranking Points | | | | |
| Rank | Prize money US$ | Winner | Runner up | 3/4 | Round-Robin Match Win | Undefeated bonus |
|---|---|---|---|---|---|---|
| World Tour Finals | $160,000 | 1000 | 550 | 200 | 150 | 150 |

=== Match points distribution ===
Points towards the standings are awarded when the following scores:

| Match score | Points |
|---|---|
| 2–0 win | 4 points |
| 2–1 win | 3 points |
| 1–2 loss | 1 point |
| 0–2 loss | 0 point |

== Qualification & Seeds ==
=== Qualification ===
Top eight players at 2018–19 PSA World Tour standings qualifies to Finals.

World Championship
| 177.5 | 1st Round | 290 | 2nd Round |
| 475 | 3rd Round | 780 | Quarterfinalist |
| 1270 | Semifinalist | 2090 | Runner-up |
| **3175** | Winner | | |

Platinum
| 152.5 | 1st Round | 250 | 2nd Round |
| 410 | 3rd Round | 675 | Quarterfinalist |
| 1100 | Semifinalist | 1810 | Runner-up |
| **2750** | Winner | | |

Gold
| 160 | 1st Round | 260 | 2nd Round |
| 430 | Quarterfinalist | 700 | Semifinalist |
| 1150 | Runner-up | **1750** | Winner |

Silver
| 112.5 | 1st Round | 182.5 | 2nd Round |
| 300 | Quarterfinalist | 490 | Semifinalist |
| 805 | Runner-up | **1225** | Winner |

Bronze
| 80 | 1st Round | 130 | 2nd Round |
| 215 | Quarterfinalist | 350 | Semifinalist |
| 575 | Runner-up | **875** | Winner |

Top 16 Women's World Tour Standings 2018–19
| Rank | Player | Tournaments Played | CHN (China) | USA (United States) | USA (United States) | USA (United States) | HKG (Hong Kong) | USA (United States) | USA (United States) | USA (United States) | EGY (Egypt) | USA (United States) | NED (Netherlands) | MAC (Macau) | EGY (Egypt) | ENG (England) | ENG (England) | Total Points |
|---|---|---|---|---|---|---|---|---|---|---|---|---|---|---|---|---|---|---|
| 1 | (Egypt) **Raneem El Weleily*** | 10 | **1750** | 805 | **2750** | – | 1810 | 1810 | – | 1270 | **1750** | – | **1750** | – | **2750** | – | 675 | 17120 |
| 2 | (Egypt) **Nour El Sherbini*** | 9 | 700 | – | 1810 | – | 675 | **2750** | – | **3175** | 1150 | – | 1150 | – | 675 | – | 675 | 12760 |
| 3 | (Egypt) **Nour El Tayeb** | 12 | 700 | – | 410 | **875** | 675 | 1100 | **875** | 2090 | 260 | – | 700 | – | 675 | 490 | 1100 | 9950 |
| 4 | (France) **Camille Serme** | 10 | 1150 | 300 | 1100 | – | 675 | 675 | – | 1270 | 430 | – | 700 | – | 1100 | – | 1810 | 9210 |
| 5 | (New Zealand) **Joelle King*** | 10 | 260 | 300 | 410 | – | **2750** | 1100 | – | 780 | 700 | – | – | – | 675 | **1225** | 675 | 8875 |
| 6 | (Egypt) **Nouran Gohar** | 9 | 430 | – | 250 | – | 1100 | 675 | – | 780 | 700 | – | – | – | 1810 | 300 | **2750** | 8795 |
| 7 | (England) **Sarah-Jane Perry** | 12 | 430 | **1225** | 675 | 575 | 1100 | – | – | 475 | 260 | 215 | 430 | – | 675 | 300 | 1100 | 7460 |
| 8 | (Wales) **Tesni Evans** | 13 | 260 | – | 1100 | 215 | 410 | 410 | 575 | 780 | 260 | 130 | 430 | – | 410 | 805 | 410 | 6195 |
| 9 | (United States) Amanda Sobhy | 11 | – | 182.5 | 675 | 215 | 410 | 410 | – | 475 | – | **875** | 430 | – | 1100 | 490 | 410 | 5672.5 |
| 10 | (England) Alison Waters | 13 | 260 | 300 | 410 | 350 | 410 | 675 | 350 | 475 | 260 | – | 260 | – | 250 | 300 | 410 | 4710 |
| 11 | (England) Laura Massaro | 11 | 260 | 490 | 675 | – | 250 | 410 | – | 475 | 430 | – | 430 | – | 410 | 300 | 250 | 4380 |
| 12 | (Hong Kong) Annie Au | 9 | – | 490 | 410 | – | 250 | 410 | – | 780 | 160 | – | – | **875** | 410 | – | 410 | 4195 |
| 13 | (Egypt) Salma Hany | 12 | 260 | 182.5 | 410 | 350 | 250 | 675 | – | 290 | 260 | – | – | 130 | 410 | 182.5 | 250 | 3650 |
| 14 | (India) Joshna Chinappa | 10 | 430 | – | 410 | 215 | 410 | 410 | – | 290 | 430 | – | – | 350 | 250 | – | 410 | 3605 |
| 15 | (England) Victoria Lust | 10 | 260 | – | 250 | 130 | 410 | 410 | 350 | 475 | – | 575 | – | – | 250 | – | 410 | 3520 |
| 16 | (Malaysia) Nicol David | 11 | 430 | 300 | 410 | – | 250 | 410 | – | 475 | 160 | – | 260 | – | 250 | 182.5 | 250 | 3377.5 |

Bold – Players qualified for the final
(*) – Winners of Platinum's tournaments automatically qualifies for Finals.

=== Seeds ===
1. (Egypt) Raneem El Weleily
2. (Egypt) Nour El Sherbini
3. (Egypt) Nour El Tayeb
4. (France) Camille Serme
5. (New Zealand) Joelle King
6. (Egypt) Nouran Gohar
7. (England) Sarah-Jane Perry
8. (Wales) Tesni Evans

== Group stage results ==
Times are Eastern European Time (UTC+02:00). To the best of three games.

=== Group A ===
| Date | Time | Player 1 | Player 2 | Score |
|---|---|---|---|---|
| 9 June | 19:00 | Raneem El Weleily (EGY) | Tesni Evans (WAL) | 11–4, 11–6 |
| 9 June | 20:00 | Camille Serme (FRA) | Joelle King (NZL) | 12–14, 12–10, 12–10 |
| 10 June | 20:00 | Raneem El Weleily (EGY) | Camille Serme (FRA) | 10–12, 11–7, 11–5 |
| 10 June | 21:00 | Joelle King (NZL) | Tesni Evans (WAL) | 9–11, 11–7, 8–11 |
| 11 June | 21:00 | Raneem El Weleily (EGY) | Joelle King (NZL) | 11–7, 11–7 |
| 12 June | 19:00 | Camille Serme (FRA) | Tesni Evans (WAL) | 11–5, 13–11 |

==== Standings ====
| Pos | Team | Pld | W | L | GF | GA | GD | Pts | Qualification |
|---|---|---|---|---|---|---|---|---|---|
| 1 | Raneem El Weleily (EGY) | 3 | 3 | 0 | 6 | 1 | +5 | 11 | Advancing to Semifinals |
| 2 | Camille Serme (FRA) | 3 | 2 | 1 | 5 | 3 | +2 | 8 | Advancing to Semifinals |
| 3 | Tesni Evans (WAL) | 3 | 1 | 2 | 2 | 5 | −3 | 3 | |
| 4 | Joelle King (NZL) | 3 | 0 | 3 | 2 | 6 | −4 | 2 | |

Source: PSA World Tour Finals

=== Group B ===
| Date | Time | Player 1 | Player 2 | Score |
|---|---|---|---|---|
| 9 June | 21:00 | Nour El Sherbini (EGY) | Sarah-Jane Perry (ENG) | 8–11, 9–11 |
| 10 June | 19:00 | Nour El Tayeb (EGY) | Nouran Gohar (EGY) | 11–4, 7–11, 11–8 |
| 11 June | 19:00 | Nour El Sherbini (EGY) | Nour El Tayeb (EGY) | 11–5, 11–7 |
| 11 June | 20:00 | Nouran Gohar (EGY) | Sarah-Jane Perry (ENG) | 11–8, 11–9 |
| 12 June | 20:00 | Nour El Sherbini (EGY) | Nouran Gohar (EGY) | 11–6, 5–11, 7–11 |
| 12 June | 21:00 | Nour El Tayeb (EGY) | Sarah-Jane Perry (ENG) | 11–0, 11–5 |

==== Standings ====
| Pos | Team | Pld | W | L | GF | GA | GD | Pts | Qualification |
|---|---|---|---|---|---|---|---|---|---|
| 1 | Nouran Gohar (EGY) | 3 | 2 | 1 | 5 | 3 | +2 | 8 | Advancing to Semifinals |
| 2 | Nour El Tayeb (EGY) | 3 | 2 | 1 | 4 | 3 | +1 | 7 | Advancing to Semifinals |
| 3 | Nour El Sherbini (EGY) | 3 | 1 | 2 | 3 | 4 | −1 | 5 | |
| 4 | Sarah-Jane Perry (ENG) | 3 | 1 | 2 | 2 | 4 | −2 | 4 | |

Source: PSA World Tour Finals

== Knockout stage ==
Semi finals (13 June)
1 | Raneem El Weleily (EGY) | 11 | 9 | 11
3 | Nour El Tayeb (EGY) | 9 | 11 | 1
6 | Nouran Gohar (EGY) | 18 | 9
4 | Camille Serme (FRA) | 20 | 11

Final (14 June)
1 | Raneem El Weleily (EGY) | 3 | 8 | 11 | 11 | 11
4 | Camille Serme (FRA) | 11 | 11 | 7 | 4 | 6

2019 Women's PSA World Tour Finals winner
(Egypt)
Raneem El Weleily
First title

=== Semifinal ===
To the best of three games.

| Date | Time | Player 1 | Player 2 | Score |
|---|---|---|---|---|
| 13 June | 19:00 | Raneem El Weleily (EGY) | Nour El Tayeb (EGY) | 11–9, 9–11, 11–1 |
| 13 June | 20:30 | Nouran Gohar (EGY) | Camille Serme (FRA) | 18–20, 9–11 |

=== Final ===
To the best of five games.

| Date | Time | Player 1 | Player 2 | Score |
|---|---|---|---|---|
| 14 June | 19:30 | Raneem El Weleily (EGY) | Camille Serme (FRA) | 3–11, 8–11, 11–7, 11–4, 11–6 |

== See also ==
- 2019 Men's PSA World Tour Finals
- 2018–19 PSA World Tour Finals
- PSA World Tour Finals
- 2018–19 PSA World Tour
