= Motor City Open 2014 =

- 15th Motor City Open

Details
- Event name: Motor City Open 2014
- Location: Detroit United States
- Venue: Birmingham Athletic Club
- Website themotorcityopen.com

Men's Winner
- Category: World Tour International 70
- Prize money: $70,000
- Year: World Tour 2014

The 2014 Motor City Open is an International 70 tournament of the PSA World Tour. The event took place at the Birmingham Athletic Club in Detroit in the United States from 25 January to 28 January 2014. Mohamed El Shorbagy won his second Motor City Open title, beating Peter Barker in the final.

== Prize money and ranking points ==
For 2014, the prize purse was $70,000. The prize money and points breakdown is as follows:

Prize money Motor City Open (2014)
Event	W	F	SF	QF	1R
Points (PSA)	1225	805	490	300	175
Prize money	$12,350	$8,450	$5,525	$3,410	$1,950

== Seeds ==
1. (Egypt) Mohamed El Shorbagy (champion)
2. (Egypt) Karim Darwish (quarterfinals)
3. (England) Peter Barker (final)
4. (Egypt) Amr Shabana (semifinals)
5. (Egypt) Omar Mosaad (quarterfinals)
6. (Egypt) Tarek Momen (first round)
7. (Colombia) Miguel Ángel Rodriguez (quarterfinals)
8. (Australia) Cameron Pilley (semifinals)

== Draw and results ==
First round
1	(Egypt) Mohd El Shorbagy	11	11	11
Q	(France) Grégoire Marche	2	6	5
Q	(Finland) Olli Tuominen	13	7	11	8	11
6	(Egypt) Tarek Momen	11	11	3	11	8
5	(Egypt) Omar Mosaad	9	11	11	7	11
(Malaysia) Ong Beng Hee	11	7	6	11	9
Q	(Egypt) Omar Abdel Meguid	5	16	2
4	(Egypt) Amr Shabana	11	18	11
3	(England) Peter Barker	11	9	12	11
(France) Mathieu Castagnet	5	11	10	1
(India) Saurav Ghosal	7	11	10	14	7
7	(Colombia) Miguel Á. Rodriguez	11	6	12	12	11
8	(Australia) Cameron Pilley	11	11	11
(South Africa) Stephen Coppinger	7	3	4
Q	(Egypt) Marwan El Shorbagy	10	9	3
2	(Egypt) Karim Darwish	12	11	11

Quarter finals
1	(Egypt) Mohd El Shorbagy	11	11	11
Q	(Finland) Olli Tuominen	9	8	7
5	(Egypt) Omar Mosaad	7	9	10
4	(Egypt) Amr Shabana	11	11	12
3	(England) Peter Barker	11	11	5	11
7	(Colombia) Miguel Á. Rodriguez	7	6	11	7
8	(Australia) Cameron Pilley	11	14	12	11
2	(Egypt) Karim Darwish	3	16	1	6

Semi finals
1	(Egypt) Mohd El Shorbagy	11	12	11
4	(Egypt) Amr Shabana	6	14	3	rtd
3	(England) Peter Barker	11	11	11
8	(Australia) Cameron Pilley	7	6	5

Final
1	(Egypt) Mohd El Shorbagy	8	12	11	11	11
3	(England) Peter Barker	11	14	4	6	7

== See also ==
- PSA World Tour 2014
- Motor City Open (squash)
