= Men's Hong Kong squash Open 2014 =

Cathay Pacific Hong Kong Open 2014
- 28th PSA Hong Kong Open

Details
- Event name: Cathay Pacific Sun Hung Kai Financial Hong Kong Squash Open 2014
- Location: Hong Kong
- Venue: Hong Kong Squash Centre - Tsim Sha Tsui
- Website http://www.hksquashopen.com/home.php

Men's Winner
- Category: World Series Platinum
- Prize money: $150,000
- Year: World Tour 2014

The Men's Cathay Pacific Hong Kong Open 2014 is the men's edition of the 2014 Hong Kong Open, which is a PSA World Series event Platinum (prize money: $150,000). The event took place in Hong Kong from 26 August to 31 August. Mohamed El Shorbagy won his first Hong Kong Open trophy, beating Grégory Gaultier in the final.

== Prize money and ranking points ==
For 2013, the prize purse was $150,000. The prize money and points breakdown is as follows:

Prize money Hong Kong Open (2014)
| Event | W | F | SF | QF | 2R | 1R |
| Points (PSA) | 2625 | 1725 | 1050 | 640 | 375 | 190 |
| Prize money | $23,625 | $15,525 | $9,450 | $5,740 | $3,375 | $1,690 |

== Seeds ==
1. (France) Grégory Gaultier (final)
2. (Egypt) Mohamed El Shorbagy (champion)
3. (England) James Willstrop (first round)
4. (Spain) Borja Golán (semifinals)
5. (England) Peter Barker (quarterfinals)
6. (Egypt) Karim Darwish (first round)
7. (England) Daryl Selby (quarterfinals)
8. (Germany) Simon Rösner (quarterfinals)

== Draw and results ==
1* First round 2*
1 | (France) Grégory Gaultier | 11 | 11 | 13
Q | (Malaysia) Mohd Nafiizwan Adnan | 4 | 4 | 11
Q | (Egypt) Fares Dessouky | 10 | 11 | 11 | 11
(France) Mathieu Castagnet | 12 | 8 | 8 | 9
(Egypt) Omar Abdel Meguid | 11 | 5 | 5 | 11 | 9
Q | (Egypt) Zahed Mohamed | 9 | 11 | 11 | 7 | 11
(Hong Kong) Max Lee | 9 | 9 | 6
7 | (England) Daryl Selby | 11 | 11 | 11
8 | (Germany) Simon Rösner | 11 | 11 | 11
Q | (Australia) Rex Hedrick | 5 | 6 | 7
Q | (Mexico) Alfredo Ávila | 6 | 11 | 11 | 9 | 11
(Egypt) Marwan El Shorbagy | 11 | 8 | 9 | 11 | 8
(Finland) Olli Tuominen | 11 | 6 | 11 | 10
Q | (South Africa) Shaun Le Roux | 8 | 11 | 13 | 12
(Egypt) Tarek Momen | 11 | 12 | 11
3 | (England) James Willstrop | 9 | 10 | 8
4 | (Spain) Borja Golán
(Netherlands) Laurens Jan Anjema | w/o
Q | (Egypt) Mohd Abouelghar | 11 | 2 | 9 | 11 | 11
(England) Joe Lee | 7 | 11 | 11 | 5 | 4
(Switzerland) Nicolas Müller | 11 | 11 | 11
(Australia) Cameron Pilley | 8 | 4 | 5
(France) Grégoire Marche | 11 | 11 | 7 | 11
6 | (Egypt) Karim Darwish | 5 | 8 | 11 | 7
5 | (England) Peter Barker | 11 | 11 | 11
(England) Adrian Waller | 7 | 4 | 5
Q | (Finland) Henrik Mustonen | 4 | 6 | 3
(India) Saurav Ghosal | 11 | 11 | 11
(England) Chris Simpson | 11 | 11 | 11
WC | (Hong Kong) Tsz Fung Yip | 3 | 4 | 7
(Egypt) Karim Abdel Gawad | 5 | 6 | 11 | 10
2 | (Egypt) Mohd El Shorbagy | 11 | 11 | 7 | 12

Second round *
1 | (France) Grégory Gaultier | 11 | 11 | 11
Q | (Egypt) Fares Dessouky | 4 | 3 | 7
Q | (Egypt) Zahed Mohamed | 8 | 11 | 7 | 5
7 | (England) Daryl Selby | 11 | 6 | 11 | 11
8 | (Germany) Simon Rösner | 11 | 11 | 11
Q | (Mexico) Alfredo Ávila | 2 | 3 | 6
Q | (South Africa) Shaun Le Roux | 10 | 11 | 11 | 6
(Egypt) Tarek Momen | 12 | 7 | 13 | 11
4 | (Spain) Borja Golán | 11 | 6 | 11 | 3 | 11
Q | (Egypt) Mohamed Abouelghar | 7 | 11 | 7 | 11 | 4
(Switzerland) Nicolas Müller | 8 | 8 | 12 | 11 | 11
(France) Grégoire Marche | 11 | 11 | 10 | 4 | 8
5 | (England) Peter Barker | 11 | 11 | 2
(India) Saurav Ghosal | 6 | 5 | 1 | rtd
(England) Chris Simpson | 3 | 1 | 7
2 | (Egypt) Mohd El Shorbagy | 11 | 11 | 11

1* Quarter finals 2*
1 | (France) Grégory Gaultier | 11 | 11 | 11
7 | (England) Daryl Selby | 2 | 3 | 8
8 | (Germany) Simon Rösner | 11 | 4 | 11 | 7 | 8
(Egypt) Tarek Momen | 7 | 11 | 7 | 11 | 11
4 | (Spain) Borja Golán | 11 | 11 | 11
(Switzerland) Nicolas Müller | 7 | 9 | 7
5 | (England) Peter Barker | 11 | 7 | 9 | 3
2 | (Egypt) Mohd El Shorbagy | 9 | 11 | 11 | 11

Semi finals
1 | (France) Grégory Gaultier * | 11 | 11 | 11
(Egypt) Tarek Momen | 7 | 2 | 3
Final
1 | (France) Grégory Gaultier | 9 | 2 | 11 | 11 | 4
2 | (Egypt) Mohd El Shorbagy * | 11 | 11 | 4 | 8 | 11
4 | (Spain) Borja Golán | 7 | 5 | 11 | 7
2 | (Egypt) Mohd El Shorbagy * | 11 | 11 | 7 | 11

== See also ==
- Hong Kong Open (squash)
- Women's Hong Kong squash Open 2014
- 2014 Men's World Open Squash Championship
- PSA World Series 2014

| Preceded by British Open; England (Hull); 2014 | PSA World Series 2014; Hong Kong Open; Hong Kong; 2014 | Succeeded by US Open; United States (Philadelphia); 2014 |
