= British Grand Prix (squash) 2014 =

Squash tournament in Manchester, England

British Grand Prix 2014
- 8th British Grand Prix

Details
- Event name: British Grand Prix 2014
- Location: Manchester, England
- Venue: National Squash Centre
- Website www.britishsquashgrandprix.com

Men's Winner
- Category: International 70
- Prize money: $70,000
- Year: World Tour 2014

The British Grand Prix 2014 is the 2014's British Grand Prix (squash), which is a tournament of the PSA World Tour event International (Prize money : $70 000 ). The event took place at the National Squash Centre in Manchester in England from 5 December to 8 December. Nick Matthew won his second British Grand Prix trophy, beating Mathieu Castagnet in the final.

== Prize money and ranking points ==
For 2014, the prize purse was $70,000. The prize money and points breakdown is as follows:

Prize Money British Grand Prix (2014)
Event	W	F	SF	QF	1R
Points (PSA)	1225	805	490	300	175
Prize money	$11,875	$8,125	$5,315	$3,280	$1,875

== Seeds ==
1. (France) Grégory Gaultier (semifinals)
2. (Egypt) Mohamed El Shorbagy (quarterfinals)
3. (England) Nick Matthew (champion)
4. (Spain) Borja Golán (first round)
5. (England) Peter Barker (quarterfinals)
6. (England) Daryl Selby (quarterfinals)
7. (Colombia) Miguel Ángel Rodríguez (semifinals)
8. (France) Mathieu Castagnet (final)

== Draw and results ==
1* First round 2*
1	(France) Grégory Gaultier	11	11	11
WC	(England) Richie Fallows	5	6	3
(England) Chris Simpson	6	5	5
5	(England) Peter Barker	11	11	11
6	(England) Daryl Selby	11	11	11
(Egypt) Fares Dessouky	4	2	9
Q	(Scotland) Greg Lobban	5	3	7
3	(England) Nick Matthew	11	11	11
4	(Spain) Borja Golán	11	9	9	11	6
(England) Adrian Waller	9	11	11	9	11
Q	(Scotland) Alan Clyne	11	9	7	7
7	(Colombia) Miguel Á. Rodríguez	7	11	11	11
8	(France) Mathieu Castagnet	11	11	11
(Egypt) Mazen Hesham	7	7	6
(Mexico) César Salazar	9	9	11	10
2	(Egypt) Mohd El Shorbagy	11	11	8	12

1* Quarter finals 2*
1	(France) Grégory Gaultier	11	11	11
5	(England) Peter Barker	3	4	2
6	(England) Daryl Selby	9	4	11	5
3	(England) Nick Matthew	11	11	7	11
(England) Adrian Waller	11	11	2	7
7	(Colombia) Miguel Á. Rodríguez	11	7	11	11
8	(France) Mathieu Castagnet	7	11	11	12
2	(Egypt) Mohamed El Shorbagy	11	7	1	10

Semi finals *
1	(France) Grégory Gaultier	7	12	13	11	5
3	(England) Nick Matthew	11	10	15	9	11
6	(Colombia) Miguel Ángel Rodríguez	2	14	11
8	(France) Mathieu Castagnet	11	16	13

Final
3	(England) Nick Matthew *	11	11	11
8	(France) Mathieu Castagnet	7	6	5

== See also ==
- PSA World Tour 2014
- British Grand Prix (squash)
