= Grasshopper Cup 2015 =

Squash tournament

- 27th Grasshopper Cup

Details
- Event name: Grasshopper Cup 2015
- Location: Zürich, Switzerland
- Venue: EWZ-Unterwerk Selnau
- Website gc-cup.com

Men's Winner
- Category: World Tour International 70
- Prize money: $70,000
- Year: World Tour 2015

The Grasshopper Cup 2015 is the Grasshopper Cup for 2015, which is a tournament of the PSA World Tour event International (Prize money: $70 000 ). The event took place in Zürich in Switzerland from 15 to 19 April. Grégory Gaultier won his first Grasshopper Cup trophy, beating Simon Rösner in the final.

== Prize money and ranking points ==
For 2015, the prize purse was $70,000. The prize money and points breakdown is as follows:

Prize Money Grasshopper Cup (2015)
Event	W	F	SF	QF	1R
Points (PSA)	1225	805	490	300	175
Prize money	$11,875	$8,125	$5,315	$3,280	$1,875

== Seeds ==
1. (France) Grégory Gaultier (champion)
2. (Egypt) Ramy Ashour (quarterfinals)
3. (Colombia) Miguel Ángel Rodríguez (semifinals)
4. (Egypt) Tarek Momen (first round)
5. (Germany) Simon Rösner (final)
6. (Egypt) Omar Mosaad (semifinals)
7. (Spain) Borja Golán (first round)
8. (France) Mathieu Castagnet (quarterfinals)

== Draw and results ==
1* First round 2*
1	(France) Grégory Gaultier	11	11	11
(Australia) Cameron Pilley	8	7	9
(England) Daryl Selby	13	11	11
7	(Spain) Borja Golán	11	9	5
8	(France) Mathieu Castagnet	4	11	11	11
Q	(France) Grégoire Marche	11	9	6	6
Q	(Netherlands) Laurens Jan Anjema	11	6	6	10
3	(Colombia) Miguel Á. Rodríguez	5	11	11	12
4	(Egypt) Tarek Momen	9	11	4	6
Q	(India) Saurav Ghosal	11	4	11	11
WC	(Switzerland) Reiko Peter	8	7	5
5	(Germany) Simon Rösner	11	11	11
6	(Egypt) Omar Mosaad	11	11	11
Q	(Scotland) Alan Clyne	6	5	4
(Switzerland) Nicolas Müller	11	11	9	11	8
2	(Egypt) Ramy Ashour *	3	6	11	13	11

Quarter finals *
1	(France) Grégory Gaultier	11	11	11
(England) Daryl Selby	6	4	5
8	(France) Mathieu Castagnet	11	4	6	2
3	(Colombia) Miguel Á. Rodríguez	8	11	11	11
Q	(India) Saurav Ghosal	11	9	6	8
5	(Germany) Simon Rösner	8	11	11	11
6	(Egypt) Omar Mosaad	11	11	7	9
2	(Egypt) Ramy Ashour	3	8	11	4	rtd

Semi finals *
1	(France) Grégory Gaultier	11	11	11
3	(Colombia) Miguel Ángel Rodríguez	7	8	8
5	(Germany) Simon Rösner	11	13	11	11
6	(Egypt) Omar Mosaad	8	11	13	6

Final
1	(France) Grégory Gaultier *	11	11	11
5	(Germany) Simon Rösner	8	3	9

== See also ==
- 2015 PSA World Tour
- Grasshopper Cup
