= Swedish Squash Open 2014 =

Swedish Open 2014
- 11th Swedish Open

Details
- Event name: Case Swedish Open 2014
- Location: Linköping Sweden
- Venue: Linköping Sporthalle
- Website www.swedishopensquash.se

Men's Winner
- Category: World Tour International 70
- Prize money: $70,000
- Year: World Tour 2014

The Case Swedish Open 2014 is the 2014's Swedish Open, which is a tournament of the PSA World Tour event International (prize money: $70,000). The event took place in Linköping in Sweden from 6 February to 9 February. Nick Matthew won his fourth Swedish Open trophy, beating Ramy Ashour in the final.

== Prize money and ranking points ==
For 2014, the prize purse was $70,000. The prize money and points breakdown is as follows:

Prize Money Swedish Open (2014)
Event	W	F	SF	QF	1R
Points (PSA)	1225	805	490	300	175
Prize money	$11,875	$8,125	$5,315	$3,280	$1,875

== Seeds ==
1. (Egypt) Ramy Ashour (Final)
2. (France) Grégory Gaultier (Semifinals)
3. (England) Nick Matthew (Champion)
4. (Spain) Borja Golán (Quarterfinals)
5. (England) Peter Barker (Quarterfinals)
6. (Egypt) Amr Shabana (Semifinals)
7. (England) Daryl Selby (Quarterfinals)
8. (Egypt) Omar Mosaad (Quarterfinals)

== Draw and results ==
1* First round 2*
1	(Egypt) Ramy Ashour	11	6	11	14
(Germany) Simon Rösner	5	11	9	12
WC	(Sweden) Rasmus Hult	11	9	9
8	(Egypt) Omar Mosaad	13	11	11
6	(Egypt) Amr Shabana	9	11	11	11
Q	(England) Chris Simpson	11	4	3	4
Q	(France) Mathieu Castagnet	8	6	3
4	(Spain) Borja Golán	11	11	11
3	(England) Nick Matthew	11	11	12
(England) Tom Richards	7	3	10
Q	(France) Grégoire Marche	12	6	11	6	1
7	(England) Daryl Selby	10	11	9	11	11
5	(England) Peter Barker	11	3	11	8	11
(Australia) Cameron Pilley	7	11	7	11	5
Q	(England) Adrian Waller	6	7	4
2	(France) Grégory Gaultier	11	11	11

1* Quarter finals 2*
1	(Egypt) Ramy Ashour	7	11	11	11
8	(Egypt) Omar Mosaad	11	5	3	5
6	(Egypt) Amr Shabana	11	11	12
4	(Spain) Borja Golán	8	8	10
3	(England) Nick Matthew	11	11	11
7	(England) Daryl Selby	3	3	6
5	(England) Peter Barker	5	3	4
2	(France) Grégory Gaultier	11	11	11

Semi finals
1	(Egypt) Ramy Ashour *	9	11	11	6	11
6	(Egypt) Amr Shabana	11	2	8	11	7
3	(England) Nick Matthew *	12	11	11
2	(France) Grégory Gaultier	10	8	1

Final
1	(Egypt) Ramy Ashour	13	6	8	11	4
3	(England) Nick Matthew *	11	11	11	6	11

== See also ==
- PSA World Tour 2014
- Swedish Open (squash)
