= Netsuite Open 2014 =

- 4th Netsuite Open

Details
- Event name: Netsuite Open 2014
- Location: San Francisco United States
- Venue: Justin Herman Plaza
- Website www.netsuiteopen.com

Men's Winner
- Category: International 70
- Prize money: $70,000
- Year: World Tour 2014

The Netsuite Open 2014 is the 2014's Netsuite Open, which is a tournament of the PSA World Tour event International (prize money: $70,000). The event took place at the Standford Squash in San Francisco in the United States from 24 to 30 of September. Grégory Gaultier won his second Netsuite Open trophy, beating Amr Shabana in the final.

== Prize money and ranking points ==
For 2014, the prize purse was $70,000. The prize money and points breakdown is as follows:

Prize money Netsuite Open (2014)
Event	W	F	SF	QF	1R
Points (PSA)	1225	805	490	300	175
Prize money	$11,875	$8,125	$5,315	$3,280	$1,875

== Seeds ==
1. (France) Grégory Gaultier (champion)
2. (Egypt) Amr Shabana (final)
3. (England) Peter Barker (semifinals)
4. (Colombia) Miguel Ángel Rodríguez (semifinals)
5. (Netherlands) Laurens Jan Anjema (quarterfinals)
6. (France) Mathieu Castagnet (first round)
7. (Australia) Cameron Pilley (first round)
8. (England) Adrian Grant (quarterfinals)

== Draw and results ==
1* First round 2*
1	(France) Grégory Gaultier	11	11	11
(France) Grégoire Marche	5	6	2
(England) Chris Simpson	11	11	9	9	12
7	(Australia) Cameron Pilley	9	5	11	11	10
5	(Netherlands) Laurens Jan Anjema	11	11	8	4	11
Q	(Mexico) César Salazar	9	7	11	11	9
Q	(Finland) Olli Tuominen	8	7	5
4	(Colombia) Miguel Á. Rodríguez	11	11	11
3	(England) Peter Barker	11	11	11
WC	(United States) Julian Illingworth	9	6	5
(Botswana) Alister Walker	7	11	14	5	11
6	(France) Mathieu Castagnet	11	6	12	11	4
8	(England) Adrian Grant	5	8	13	11	11
Q	(New Zealand) Campbell Grayson	11	11	11	7	6
Q	(Scotland) Alan Clyne	7	8	5
2	(Egypt) Amr Shabana	11	11	11

Quarter finals
1	(France) Grégory Gaultier *	11	11	11
(England) Chris Simpson	9	4	4
5	(Netherlands) Laurens Jan Anjema	4	5	rtd
4	(Colombia) Miguel Á. Rodríguez *	11	11
3	(England) Peter Barker *	11	11	11
(Botswana) Alister Walker	5	5	9
8	(England) Adrian Grant	6	3	11	9
2	(Egypt) Amr Shabana *	11	11	6	11

Semi finals
1	(France) Grégory Gaultier *	11	11	11
4	(Colombia) Miguel Á. Rodríguez	6	5	3
3	(England) Peter Barker	11	8	5	5
2	(Egypt) Amr Shabana *	6	11	11	11

Final
1	(France) Grégory Gaultier *	11	11	11
2	(Egypt) Amr Shabana	3	5	5

== See also ==
- PSA World Tour 2014
- Netsuite Open
