= Men's Abierto Mexicano de Raquetas 2014 =

Abierto Mexicano 2014
- 3rd PSA Abierto Mexicano

Details
- Event name: Abierto Mexicano de Raquetas 2014
- Location: Huixquilucan Mexico
- Website www.abiertomexicanoderaquetas.com

Men's Winner
- Category: International 70
- Prize money: $70,000
- Year: World Tour 2014

The Men's Abierto Mexicano de Raquetas 2014 is the men's edition of the 2014 Abierto Mexicano de Raquetas, which is a tournament of the PSA World Tour event International (prize money: $70,000). The event took place in Huixquilucan in Mexico from 18 September to 22 September. Mohamed El Shorbagy won his first Abierto Mexicano de Raquetas trophy, beating Marwan El Shorbagy in the final.

== Prize money and ranking points ==
For 2014, the prize purse was $70,000. The prize money and points breakdown is as follows:

Prize money Abierto Mexicano de Raquetas (2014)
Event	W	F	SF	QF	1R
Points (PSA)	1225	805	490	300	175
Prize money	$11,875	$8,125	$5,315	$3,280	$1,875

== Seeds ==
1. (Egypt) Mohamed El Shorbagy (champion)
2. (Germany) Simon Rösner (quarterfinals)
3. (Egypt) Tarek Momen (quarterfinals)
4. (Egypt) Omar Mosaad (semifinals)
5. (Colombia) Miguel Ángel Rodríguez (quarterfinals)
6. (Egypt) Marwan El Shorbagy (final)
7. (France) Mathieu Castagnet (quarterfinals)
8. (South Africa) Stephen Coppinger (first round)

== Draw and results ==
First round
1	(Egypt) Mohd El Shorbagy	11	11	11
Q	(Mexico) Alfredo Ávila	8	7	9
(Switzerland) Nicolas Müller	7	8	11	7
5	(Colombia) Miguel Á. Rodríguez	11	11	5	11
8	(South Africa) Stephen Coppinger	5	7	11	5
Q	(Peru) Diego Elías	11	11	3	11
(France) Grégoire Marche	10	7	8
4	(Egypt) Omar Mosaad	12	11	11
3	(Egypt) Tarek Momen	8	6	8
WC	(Mexico) César Salazar	11	11	11
Q	(South Africa) Shaun Le Roux	2	6	2
7	(France) Mathieu Castagnet	11	11	11
6	(Egypt) Marwan El Shorbagy	11	11	1	13
Q	(Mexico) Arturo Salazar	4	9	11	11
(Finland) Olli Tuominen	6	7	8
2	(Germany) Simon Rösner	11	11	11

Quarter finals
1	(Egypt) Mohd El Shorbagy	11	11	9	11
5	(Colombia) Miguel Á. Rodríguez	1	9	11	5
Q	(Peru) Diego Elías	7	11	4	10
4	(Egypt) Omar Mosaad	11	8	11	12
WC	(Mexico) César Salazar	11	11	3	8	12
7	(France) Mathieu Castagnet	9	7	11	11	10
6	(Egypt) Marwan El Shorbagy	12	11	11
2	(Germany) Simon Rösner	10	9	8

Semi finals
1	(Egypt) Mohd El Shorbagy	11	11	9	8
4	(Egypt) Omar Mosaad	7	6	11	2	rtd
WC	(Mexico) César Salazar	10	11	7	7
8	(Egypt) Marwan El Shorbagy	12	2	11	11

Final
1	(Egypt) Mohd El Shorbagy	11	11	11
8	(Egypt) Marwan El Shorbagy	3	3	2

== See also ==
- PSA World Tour 2014
- Abierto Mexicano de Raquetas
