= 2019 Men's PSA World Tour Finals =

PSA World Tour Finals
- 1st Men's PSA World Tour Finals
- Location: Cairo, Egypt
- Venue: Mall of Arabia
- Date: 9–14 June 2019
- Website worldtourfinals.com
- Prize money: $160,000

Results
- Champion: Karim Abdel Gawad (EGY)
- Runner-up: Mohamed Abouelghar (EGY)
- Semi-finalists: Tarek Momen (EGY); Mohamed El Shorbagy (EGY)

The 2019 CIB Men's PSA World Series Finals was the men's edition of the PSA World Tour Finals (Prize money : $160,000). The top 8 players in the 2018–19 PSA World Tour are qualified for the event. The event took place at Mall of Arabia, Cairo in Egypt from 9–14 June 2019.

It was the first edition under the PSA World Tour Finals label after the PSA renamed PSA World Series to current PSA World Tour Finals. CIB sponsored the event.

Mohamed El Shorbagy was the defending champion but lost in Semifinals to Karim Abdel Gawad. Gawad won his first PSA Finals title after defeating fellow countryman Mohamed Abouelghar 3–2 in a marathon match (92m). Karim started the match winning first two games 2–0, before Abouelghar equalled it 2–2. Karim Abdel Gawad won the last game 12–10 (3–2) becoming new champion.

== PSA World Ranking Points ==
PSA also awards points towards World Ranking. Points are awarded as follows:

PSA World Tour Finals		Ranking Points				
Rank	Prize money US$	Winner	Runner up	3/4	Round-Robin Match Win	Undefeated bonus
World Tour Finals	$160,000	1000	550	200	150	150

=== Match points distribution ===
Points towards the standings are awarded when the following scores:

Match score	Points
2–0 win	4 points
2–1 win	3 points
1–2 loss	1 point
0–2 loss	0 point

== Qualification & Seeds ==
=== Qualification ===
Top eight players at 2018–19 PSA World Tour standings qualifies to Finals.

World Championship
177.5	1st Round	290	2nd Round
475	3rd Round	780	Quarterfinalist
1270	Semifinalist	2090	Runner-up
**3175**	Winner		

Platinum
152.5	1st Round	250	2nd Round
410	3rd Round	675	Quarterfinalist
1100	Semifinalist	1810	Runner-up
**2750**	Winner		

Gold
160	1st Round	260	2nd Round
430	Quarterfinalist	700	Semifinalist
1150	Runner-up	**1750**	Winner

Silver
112.5	1st Round	182.5	2nd Round
300	Quarterfinalist	490	Semifinalist
805	Runner-up	**1225**	Winner

Bronze
80	1st Round	130	2nd Round
215	Quarterfinalist	350	Semifinalist
575	Runner-up	**875**	Winner

Top 16 Men's PSA World Tour Standings 2018–19
Rank	Player	Tournaments Played	CHN (China)	USA (United States)	USA (United States)	ENG (England)	QAT (Qatar)	QAT (Qatar)	HKG (Hong Kong)	PAK (Pakistan)	EGY (Egypt)	IND (India)	USA (United States)	USA (United States)	USA (United States)	USA (United States)	CAN (Canada)	ENG (England)	SUI (Switzerland)	NED (Netherlands)	MAC (Macau)	EGY (Egypt)	ENG (England)	ENG (England)	GUA (Guatemala)	Total Points
1	(Egypt) **Ali Farag***	12	–	**1750**	1100	1150	**2750**	–	1810	–	1810	–	**2750**	–	–	**3175**	–	–	430	**1750**	–	**2750**	–	1810	–	23035
2	(Egypt) **Mohamed El Shorbagy***	13	–	1150	**2750**	260	675	–	**2750**	–	675	–	1810	–	–	1270	–	700	**1750**	1150	–	675	–	**2750**	–	18365
3	(Egypt) **Tarek Momen**	12	–	430	675	**1750**	1100	–	1100	–	1100	**1225**	1100	–	–	2090	–	1150	1150	–	–	1100	–	–	–	13970
4	(Egypt) **Karim Abdel Gawad***	13	–	700	410	700	675	–	675	**875**	**2750**	–	1100	–	–	177.5	–	–	700	700	–	1810	–	1100	–	12372.5
5	(New Zealand) **Paul Coll**	13	1150	–	1100	430	675	–	675	–	1100	–	675	–	–	780	805	**1750**	–	430	–	675	–	1100	–	11345
6	(Germany) **Simon Rösner**	13	700	430	1810	–	1810	–	1100	–	675	–	675	–	–	1270	–	260	430	700	–	675	–	675	–	11210
7	(Peru) **Diego Elías**	15	–	430	250	700	1100	–	410	575	410	–	675	805	–	177.5	**1225**	–	–	–	**875**	410	–	250	575	8867.5
8	(Egypt) **Mohamed Abouelghar**	13	**1750**	–	675	–	250	–	675	–	675	–	250	**1225**	–	475	490	–	700	260	–	250	–	675	–	8350
9	(Colombia) Miguel Ángel Rodríguez	14	260	430	675	–	250	–	675	–	250	–	250	300	–	780	–	–	430	430	–	410	–	675	**875**	6690
10	(India) Saurav Ghosal	14	700	260	410	430	410	–	250	–	675	300	410	–	–	780	–	–	430	–	215	410	–	250	–	5930
11	(Egypt) Omar Mosaad	15	260	–	410	260	250	575	250	–	410	182.5	675	300	–	177.5	–	–	–	–	575	410	130	410	–	5275
12	(Egypt) Marwan El Shorbagy	10	–	–	–	–	–	–	–	–	–	182.5	250	490	–	780	490	260	–	430	–	675	**875**	410	–	4842.5
13	(Wales) Joel Makin	13	430	160	410	430	675	–	250	–	–	–	250	–	–	475	–	430	260	260	–	410	–	250	–	4690
14	(England) Tom Richards	15	260	–	250	430	410	–	410	–	250	182.5	250	–	–	290	300	260	–	160	–	250	130	250	–	4082.5
15	(France) Grégoire Marche	13	–	260	152.5	–	152.5	–	250	–	410	–	410	–	**875**	290	–	160	160	260	–	250	–	410	–	4040
16	(Egypt) Fares Dessouky	7	–	–	–	–	–	–	–	–	–	805	410	–	–	475	–	430	–	–	–	1100	130	410	–	3760

Bold – Players qualified for the final
(*) – Winners of Platinum's tournaments automatically qualifies for Finals.

=== Seeds ===
1. (Egypt) Ali Farag
2. (Egypt) Mohamed El Shorbagy
3. (Egypt) Tarek Momen
4. (Egypt) Karim Abdel Gawad
5. (New Zealand) Paul Coll
6. (Germany) Simon Rösner
7. (Peru) Diego Elías
8. (Egypt) Mohamed Abouelghar

== Group stage results ==
Times are Eastern European Time (UTC+02:00). To the best of three games.

=== Group A ===
Date	Time	Player 1	Player 2	Score
9 June	21:30	Ali Farag (EGY)	Mohamed Abouelghar (EGY)	12–10, 11–9
10 June	19:30	Karim Abdel Gawad (EGY)	Paul Coll (NZL)	11–5, 13–11
11 June	19:30	Ali Farag (EGY)	Karim Abdel Gawad (EGY)	9–11, 8–11
11 June	20:30	Paul Coll (NZL)	Mohamed Abouelghar (EGY)	3–11, 6–11
12 June	20:30	Ali Farag (EGY)	Paul Coll (NZL)	9–11, 12–10, 11–9
12 June	21:30	Karim Abdel Gawad (EGY)	Mohamed Abouelghar (EGY)	9–11, 3–11

==== Standings ====
Pos	Team	Pld	W	L	GF	GA	GD	Pts	Qualification
1	Mohamed Abouelghar (EGY)	3	2	1	4	2	+2	8 (Note: Head-to-head: Abouelghar (11–9, 11–3) Gawad)	Advancing to Semifinals
2	Karim Abdel Gawad (EGY)	3	2	1	4	2	+2	8	Advancing to Semifinals
3	Ali Farag (EGY)	3	2	1	4	3	+1	7	
4	Paul Coll (NZL)	3	0	3	1	6	−5	1	

Source: PSA World Tour Finals

=== Group B ===
Date	Time	Player 1	Player 2	Score
9 June	19:30	Mohamed El Shorbagy (EGY)	Diego Elías (PER)	6–11, 11–3, 17–15
9 June	20:30	Tarek Momen (EGY)	Simon Rösner (GER)	6–11, 11–3, 11–8
10 June	20:30	Simon Rösner (GER)	Diego Elías (PER)	11–5, 8–11, 9–11
10 June	21:30	Mohamed El Shorbagy (EGY)	Tarek Momen (EGY)	11–9, 5–11, 11–6
11 June	21:30	Mohamed El Shorbagy (EGY)	Simon Rösner (GER)	11–9, 11–4
12 June	19:30	Tarek Momen (EGY)	Diego Elías (PER)	11–2, 4–11, 11–8

==== Standings ====
Pos	Team	Pld	W	L	GF	GA	GD	Pts	Qualification
1	Mohamed El Shorbagy (EGY)	3	3	0	6	2	+4	10	Advancing to Semifinals
2	Tarek Momen (EGY)	3	2	1	5	4	+1	7	Advancing to Semifinals
3	Diego Elías (PER)	3	1	2	4	5	−1	5	
4	Simon Rösner (GER)	3	0	3	2	6	−4	2	

Source: PSA World Tour Finals

== Knockout stage ==
Semi finals (13 June)
8	Mohamed Abouelghar (EGY)	9	11	11
3	Tarek Momen (EGY)	11	5	8
2	Mohamed El Shorbagy (EGY)	8	2
4	Karim Abdel Gawad (EGY)	11	11

Final (14 June)
8	Mohamed Abouelghar (EGY)	10	6	11	11	10
4	Karim Abdel Gawad (EGY)	12	11	5	8	12

2019 Men's PSA World Tour Finals winner
(Egypt)
Karim Abdel Gawad
First title

=== Semifinal ===
To the best of three games.

Date	Time	Player 1	Player 2	Score
13 June	19:45	Mohamed El Shorbagy (EGY)	Karim Abdel Gawad (EGY)	8–11, 2–11
13 June	21:15	Mohamed Abouelghar (EGY)	Tarek Momen (EGY)	9–11, 11–5, 11–8

=== Final ===
To the best of five games.

Date	Time	Player 1	Player 2	Score
14 June	21:00	Mohamed Abouelghar (EGY)	Karim Abdel Gawad (EGY)	10–12, 6–11, 11–5, 11–8, 10–12

== See also ==
- 2019 Women's PSA World Tour Finals
- 2018–19 PSA World Tour Finals
- PSA World Tour Finals
- 2018–19 PSA World Tour
