= Men's United States Open (squash) 2014 =

US Open 2014
- 27th PSA U.S. Open

Details
- Event name: Delaware Investments United States Open 2014
- Location: (United States) Philadelphia, Pennsylvania
- Venue: Daskalakis Athletic Center
- Website www.usopensquash.com/philadelphia/

Men's Winner
- Category: World Series Gold
- Prize money: $115,000
- Year: World Tour 2014

The Men's United States Squash Open 2014 was the men's edition of the 2014 United States Open (squash), which is a PSA World Series event Gold (Prize money: $115,000). The event took place at the Daskalakis Athletic Center in Philadelphia, Pennsylvania in the United States from the 11th of October to the 18th October. Mohamed El Shorbagy won his first US Open trophy, beating Amr Shabana in the final.

== Prize money and ranking points ==
For 2014, the prize purse was $115,000. The on-site prize money and points breakdown was as follows:

Prize Money US Open (2014)
Event	W	F	SF	QF	2R	1R
Points (PSA)	2015	1325	805	490	290	145
Prize money	$17,500	$11,500	$7,000	$4,250	$2,500	$1,250

== Seeds ==
1. (France) Grégory Gaultier (semifinals)
2. (England) Nick Matthew (semifinals)
3. (Egypt) Mohamed El Shorbagy (champion)
4. (Egypt) Amr Shabana (final)
5. (Spain) Borja Golán (first round)
6. (Germany) Simon Rösner (quarterfinals)
7. (Egypt) Omar Mosaad (quarterfinals)
8. (India) Saurav Ghosal (first round)

== Draw and results ==
1* 2* First round 3* 4*
1	(France) Grégory Gaultier	11	11	11
Q	(Egypt) Mohamed Abouelghar	1	1	5
(England) Adrian Grant	2	11	7
(Scotland) Alan Clyne	11	13	11
(France) Grégoire Marche	7	5	6
Q	(Hong Kong) Leo Au	11	11	11
(France) Mathieu Castagnet	2	8	11	11	5
6	(Germany) Simon Rösner	11	11	6	5	11
5	(Spain) Borja Golán	11	10	8	11	9
(England) Adrian Waller	8	12	11	7	11
Q	(France) Lucas Serme	11	8	5	11	9
(Egypt) Mazen Hesham	6	11	11	7	11
(Australia) Cameron Pilley	11	11	11
Q	(Australia) Ryan Cuskelly	9	9	4
Q	(Scotland) Greg Lobban	2	7	7
3	(Egypt) Mohd El Shorbagy	11	11	11
4	(Egypt) Amr Shabana	11	11	11
Q	(Egypt) Mohd Ali Anwar Reda	6	7	5
(Hong Kong) Max Lee	11	11	11
(England) Joe Lee	5	7	8
(Switzerland) Nicolas Müller	6	11	11	11	11
(South Africa) Stephen Coppinger	11	4	13	7	9
WC	(United States) Christopher Gordon	10	7	4
7	(Egypt) Omar Mosaad	12	11	11
8	(India) Saurav Ghosal	8	11	11	10	7
(Egypt) Fares Dessouky	11	4	5	12	11
(Egypt) Karim Abdel Gawad	8	11	11	11
(Botswana) Alister Walker	11	8	9	6
(England) Chris Simpson	11	11	11
Q	(South Africa) Shaun Le Roux	3	2	5
Q	(England) Eddie Charlton	3	5	5
2	(England) Nick Matthew	11	11	11

1* 2* Second round 3* 4*
1	(France) Grégory Gaultier	13	11	11
(Scotland) Alan Clyne	11	5	3
Q	(Hong Kong) Leo Au	3	7	8
6	(Germany) Simon Rösner	11	11	11
(England) Adrian Waller	11	11	7	11
(Egypt) Mazen Hesham	6	4	11	9
(Australia) Cameron Pilley	13	9	6
3	(Egypt) Mohd El Shorbagy	15	11	11
4	(Egypt) Amr Shabana	12	13	11	4	11
(Hong Kong) Max Lee	10	15	6	11	8
(Switzerland) Nicolas Müller	7	9	5
7	(Egypt) Omar Mosaad	11	11	11
(Egypt) Fares Dessouky	6	4	12	11	11
(Egypt) Karim Abdel Gawad	11	11	10	9	9
(England) Chris Simpson	6	6	9
2	(England) Nick Matthew	11	11	11

Quarter finals *
1	(France) Grégory Gaultier *	11	13	11	11
6	(Germany) Simon Rösner	8	11	13	3
(England) Adrian Waller	16	8	9
3	(Egypt) Mohd El Shorbagy *	18	11	11
4	(Egypt) Amr Shabana	11	11	11
7	(Egypt) Omar Mosaad	3	8	8
(Egypt) Fares Dessouky	5	4	6
2	(England) Nick Matthew	11	11	11

Semi finals
1	(France) Grégory Gaultier	6	9	4
3	(Egypt) Mohd El Shorbagy *	11	11	11
Final
3	(Egypt) Mohd El Shorbagy *	8	11	11	11
4	(Egypt) Amr Shabana	11	9	3	3
4	(Egypt) Amr Shabana *	11	11	10	11
2	(England) Nick Matthew	5	9	12	7

== See also ==
- United States Open (squash)
- PSA World Series 2014
- Women's United States Open (squash) 2014

Preceded by Hong Kong Open; Hong Kong; 2014	PSA World Series 2014; United States Open; United States (Philadelphia); 2014	Succeeded by World Championship; Qatar (Doha); 2014
