= Men's Windy City Open 2014 =

Windy City Open 2014
- 15th PSA Windy City Open

Details
- Event name: Guggenheim Partners MetroSquash Windy City Open
- Location: Chicago United States
- Venue: University Club of Chicago
- Website www.windycityopen.com

Men's Winner
- Category: World Series Gold
- Prize money: $115,000
- Year: World Tour 2014

The Men's Windy City Open 2014 is the men's edition of the 2014 Windy City Open, which is a PSA World Series event Gold (prize money: $115 000 ). The event took place at the University Club of Chicago in the United States from 26 February to 3 March. Grégory Gaultier won his first Windy City Open trophy, beating Ramy Ashour in the final.

== Prize money and ranking points ==
For 2014, the prize purse was $115,000. The prize money and points breakdown is as follows:

Prize money Windy City Open (2014)
Event	W	F	SF	QF	2R	1R
Points (PSA)	2015	1325	805	490	290	145
Prize money	$17,500	$11,500	$7,000	$4,250	$2,500	$1,250

== Seeds ==
1. (England) Nick Matthew (semifinals)
2. (France) Grégory Gaultier (champion)
3. (Egypt) Ramy Ashour (final)
4. (Egypt) Mohamed El Shorbagy (semifinals)
5. (England) James Willstrop (quarterfinals)
6. (Egypt) Karim Darwish (first round)
7. (Spain) Borja Golán (second round)
8. (England) Peter Barker (quarterfinals)

== Draw and results ==
1* First round 2*
1	(England) Nick Matthew	11	12	11
Q	(Australia) Ryan Cuskelly	6	10	9
Q	(Finland) Henrik Mustonen	4	6	4
(Netherlands) Laurens Jan Anjema	11	11	11
(France) Mathieu Castagnet	12	11	11
(Botswana) Alister Walker	10	6	9
LL	(United States) Chris Gordon	9	5	6
8	(England) Peter Barker	11	11	11
5	(England) James Willstrop	11	11	11
Q	(Malaysia) Mohd Nafi. Adnan	4	7	4
Q	(England) Adrian Waller	6	6	9
(Egypt) Amr Shabana	11	11	11
(Egypt) Marwan El Shorbagy	5	11	11	11
(England) Tom Richards	11	7	8	3
(Australia) Cameron Pilley	11	6	3	3
3	(Egypt) Ramy Ashour	8	11	11	11
4	(Egypt) Mohd El Shorbagy	8	11	11	11
(South Africa) Stephen Coppinger	11	7	8	6
Q	(Canada) Shawn Delierre	6	4	3
(Egypt) Omar Mosaad	11	11	11
(India) Saurav Ghosal	11	12	11
WC	(Wales) Peter Creed	6	10	7
(Egypt) Tarek Momen	6	11	9	11	11
6	(Egypt) Karim Darwish	11	3	11	8	7
7	(Spain) Borja Golán	11	13	11	11
(Colombia) Miguel Á. Rodríguez	5	11	13	6
Q	(England) Chris Simpson	11	8	7	5
(Germany) Simon Rösner	8	11	11	11
(Egypt) Karim Abdel Gawad	11	11	14
Q	(Egypt) Karim Ali Fathi	5	5	12
Q	(England) Joe Lee	5	1	0
2	(France) Grégory Gaultier	11	11	11

1* Second round 2*
1	(England) Nick Matthew	11	11	11
(Netherlands) Laurens Jan Anjema	7	7	9
(France) Mathieu Castagnet	3	11	6	3
8	(England) Peter Barker	11	3	11	11
5	(England) James Willstrop	11	11	11
(Egypt) Amr Shabana	4	8	1
(Egypt) Marwan El Shorbagy	11	7	4
3	(Egypt) Ramy Ashour	13	11	11
4	(Egypt) Mohd El Shorbagy	11	11	11
(Egypt) Omar Mosaad	4	6	3
(India) Saurav Ghosal	11	3	11	11
(Egypt) Tarek Momen	9	11	4	7
7	(Spain) Borja Golán	6	5	6
(Germany) Simon Rösner	11	11	11
(Egypt) Karim Abdel Gawad	1	6	7
2	(France) Grégory Gaultier	11	11	11

1* Quarter finals 2*
1	(England) Nick Matthew	11	11	11
8	(England) Peter Barker	2	6	3
5	(England) James Willstrop	11	8	8	8
3	(Egypt) Ramy Ashour	8	11	11	11
4	(Egypt) Mohd El Shorbagy	11	13	11
(India) Saurav Ghosal	6	11	7
(Germany) Simon Rösner	11	7	8	9
2	(France) Grégory Gaultier	6	11	11	11

Semi finals *
1	(England) Nick Matthew	9	12	1	4
3	(Egypt) Ramy Ashour	11	10	11	11
Final
3	(Egypt) Ramy Ashour	7	3	4
2	(France) Grégory Gaultier *	11	11	11
4	(Egypt) Mohd El Shorbagy	7	11	9	6
2	(France) Grégory Gaultier	11	6	11	11

== See also ==
- PSA World Tour 2014
- Women's Windy City Open 2014
- Metro Squash Windy City Open

Preceded by Tournament of Champions; United States (New York); 2014	PSA World Series 2014; Windy City Open; United States (Chicago); 2014	Succeeded by El Gouna International; Egypt (El Gouna); 2014
