= Men's Tournament of Champions 2014 =

Squash tournament held in New York City, US

- 80th Tournament of Champions

Details
- Event name: J. P. Morgan Tournament of Champions 2014
- Location: New York City United States
- Venue: Grand Central Terminal
- Website www.tocsquash.com

Men's Winner
- Category: World Series Gold
- Prize money: $115,000
- Year: World Tour 2014

The Men's J. P. Morgan Tournament of Champions 2014 is the men's edition of the 2014 Tournament of Champions, which is a PSA World Series event Gold (prize money: 115 000 $). The event took place at the Grand Central Terminal in New York City in the United States from 17 January to 24 January. Amr Shabana won his third Tournament of Champions trophy, beating Grégory Gaultier in the final.

== Prize money and ranking points ==
For 2014, the prize purse was $115,000. The prize money and points breakdown is as follows:

Prize money Tournament of Champions (2014)
Event	W	F	SF	QF	2R	1R
Points (PSA)	2015	1325	805	490	290	145
Prize money	$17,500	$11,500	$7,000	$4,250	$2,500	$1,250

== Seeds ==
1. (France) Grégory Gaultier (final)
2. (England) Nick Matthew (quarterfinals)
3. (Egypt) Mohamed El Shorbagy (semifinals)
4. (England) James Willstrop (semifinals)
5. (Egypt) Karim Darwish (second round)
6. (England) Peter Barker (quarterfinals)
7. (Egypt) Amr Shabana (champion)
8. (England) Daryl Selby (quarterfinals)

== Draw and results ==
1* 2* First round 3* 4*
1	(France) Grégory Gaultier	11	11	11
(England) Tom Richards	4	8	6
(Colombia) Miguel Á. Rodríguez	11	7	16
(Botswana) Alister Walker	13	11	18
(Germany) Simon Rösner	14	14	4	11	11
(India) Saurav Ghosal	12	16	11	9	5
(Egypt) Omar Mosaad	11	13	7	5	9
5	(Egypt) Karim Darwish	6	11	11	11	11
8	(England) Daryl Selby	11	11	11
Q	(England) Adrian Waller	9	7	5
Q	(Egypt) Ali Farag	11	0	10	5
(England) Chris Simpson	9	11	12	11
(Egypt) Tarek Momen	11	11	11
Q	(Egypt) Omar Abdel Meguid	5	6	8
WC	(United States) Todd Harrity	3	10	2
3	(Egypt) Mohd El Shorbagy	11	11	11
4	(England) James Willstrop	7	11	12	11
Q	(Switzerland) Nicolas Müller	11	1	10	5
Q	(Malaysia) Mohd Nafi. Adnan	2	6	2
(Australia) Cameron Pilley	11	11	11
(France) Mathieu Castagnet	8	9	11	11	11
Q	(France) Grégoire Marche	11	11	7	8	4
(Egypt) Karim Abdel Gawad	11	6	11	7	3
6	(England) Peter Barker	5	11	4	11	11
7	(Egypt) Amr Shabana	11	11	11
Q	(Egypt) Omar Abdel Aziz	3	6	7
Q	(Egypt) Mohd Ali Anwar Reda	8	4	9
(Netherlands) Laurens Jan Anjema	11	11	11
(Malaysia) Ong Beng Hee	7	11	7	5
(South Africa) Stephen Coppinger	11	6	11	11
(England) Adrian Grant	4	5	4
2	(England) Nick Matthew	11	11	11

1* Second round 2*
1	(France) Grégory Gaultier	11	11	11
(Botswana) Alister Walker	5	5	7
(Germany) Simon Rösner	11	12	11
5	(Egypt) Karim Darwish	2	10	5
8	(England) Daryl Selby	11	11	7	11
(England) Chris Simpson	6	9	11	6
(Egypt) Tarek Momen	11	7	8	10
3	(Egypt) Mohd El Shorbagy	9	11	11	12
4	(England) James Willstrop	12	11	13
(Australia) Cameron Pilley	10	1	11
(France) Mathieu Castagnet	9	8	11	11
6	(England) Peter Barker	11	11	3	13
7	(Egypt) Amr Shabana	11	11	11
(Netherlands) Laurens Jan Anjema	8	3	5
(South Africa) Stephen Coppinger	7	2	4
2	(England) Nick Matthew	11	11	11

* Quarter finals
1	(France) Grégory Gaultier	12	11	11
(Germany) Simon Rösner	10	6	7
8	(England) Daryl Selby	11	7	5	8
3	(Egypt) Mohd El Shorbagy	8	11	11	11
4	(England) James Willstrop *	11	5	12	11
6	(England) Peter Barker	7	11	10	5
7	(Egypt) Amr Shabana *	9	12	11	2	11
2	(England) Nick Matthew	11	10	7	11	9

Semi finals *
1	(France) Grégory Gaultier	5	11	11	14
3	(Egypt) Mohd El Shorbagy	11	6	8	12
Final
1	(France) Grégory Gaultier	8	3	4
7	(Egypt) Amr Shabana *	11	11	11
4	(England) James Willstrop	5	11	5	5
7	(Egypt) Amr Shabana	11	5	11	11

== See also ==
- PSA World Tour 2014
- Women's Tournament of Champions 2014
- Tournament of Champions (squash)

Preceded by Hong Kong Open; Hong Kong; 2013	PSA World Series 2014; Tournament of Champions; USA (New York); 2014	Succeeded by Windy City Open; United States (Chicago) 2014
