= Men's China Squash Open 2014 =

China Squash Open 2014
- 4th PSA China Open

Details
- Event name: China Open 2014
- Location: Shanghai, China
- Venue: The Peninsula Shanghai
- Website www.squashsite.co.uk/2009/china2014.htm

Men's Winner
- Category: International 70
- Prize money: $70,000
- Year: World Tour 2016

The Men's China Squash Open 2014 is the men's edition of the 2014 China Squash Open, which is a tournament of the PSA World Tour event International (Prize money : $70 000 ). The event took place in Shanghai in China from 4 to 7 September. James Willstrop won his first China Squash Open trophy, beating Peter Barker in the final.

== Prize money and ranking points ==
For 2014, the prize purse was $70,000. The prize money and points breakdown is as follows:

Prize Money China Open (2014)
Event	W	F	SF	QF	1R
Points (PSA)	1225	805	490	300	175
Prize money	$11,875	$8,125	$5,315	$3,280	$1,875

== Seeds ==
1. (England) James Willstrop (Champion)
2. (Spain) Borja Golán (Quarterfinals)
3. (England) Peter Barker (Final)
4. (England) Daryl Selby (Quarterfinals)
5. (Egypt) Omar Mosaad (Semifinals)
6. (Netherlands) Laurens Jan Anjema (Semifinals)
7. (Egypt) Marwan El Shorbagy (Quarterfinals)
8. (Egypt) Karim Abdel Gawad (Quarterfinals)

== Draw and results ==
First round
1	(England) James Willstrop	11	11	11
(China) Junjie Wang	2	0	3
Q	(England) Joe Lee	6	11	8	11	11
7	(Egypt) Marwan El Shorbagy	11	6	11	6	13
5	(Egypt) Omar Mosaad	11	11	11
Q	(Finland) Henrik Mustonen	2	4	3
(Australia) Cameron Pilley	7	8	11	6
4	(England) Daryl Selby	11	11	5	11
3	(England) Peter Barker	11	11	11
(Hong Kong) Max Lee	5	7	7
Q	(England) Tom Richards	7	11	11	2	9
8	(Egypt) Karim Abdel Gawad	11	6	9	11	11
6	(Netherlands) Laurens Jan Anjema	11	13	11
(England) Adrian Waller	8	11	6
Q	(Egypt) Fares Dessouky	7	11	10	11	9
2	(Spain) Borja Golán	11	3	12	4	11

Quarter finals
1	(England) James Willstrop	11	7	11	11
7	(Egypt) Marwan El Shorbagy	8	11	8	3
5	(Egypt) Omar Mosaad	9	11	11	11
4	(England) Daryl Selby	11	7	9	6
3	(England) Peter Barker	11	11	11
8	(Egypt) Karim Abdel Gawad	6	5	2
6	(Netherlands) Laurens Jan Anjema	7	11	10	11	11
2	(Spain) Borja Golán	11	1	12	9	1

Semi finals
1	(England) James Willstrop	8	11	11	11
5	(Egypt) Omar Mosaad	11	5	3	4
3	(England) Peter Barker	11	11	11
6	(Netherlands) Laurens Jan Anjema	5	5	2

Final
1	(England) James Willstrop	11	11	9	10	11
3	(England) Peter Barker	7	7	11	12	5

== See also ==
- PSA World Tour 2014
- China Squash Open
- Women's China Squash Open 2014
