= 2014 PSA World Series =

PSA World Series 2014

Details
- Event name: PSA World Series 2014
- Website www.psaworldtour.com/page/SuperSeriesRanking
- Year: World Tour 2014

The PSA World Series 2014 is a series of men's squash tournaments which are part of the Professional Squash Association (PSA) World Tour for the 2014 squash season. The PSA World Series tournaments are some of the most prestigious events on the men's tour. Mohamed El Shorbagy won the 2014 PSA World Series followed by Grégory Gaultier and Ramy Ashour.

== PSA World Series Ranking Points ==
PSA World Series events also have a separate World Series ranking. Points for this are calculated on a cumulative basis after each World Series event. The top eight players at the end of the calendar year are then eligible to play in the PSA World Series Finals.

Tournament			Ranking Points
Rank	Prize Money US$	Ranking Points	Winner	Runner up	3/4	5/8	9/16	17/32
World Series	$115,000-$325,000	625 points	100	65	40	25	15	10

== 2014 Tournaments ==
Tournament	Country	Location	Rank	Prize money	Date	2014 Winner
Tournament of Champions 2014	United States	New York City	World Series Gold	$115,000	17–24 January 2014	(Egypt) Amr Shabana
Metro Squash Windy City Open 2014	United States	Richmond, Virginia	World Series Gold	$115,000	26 February – 3 March 2014	(France) Grégory Gaultier
El Gouna International 2014	Egypt	El Gouna	World Series Gold	$115,000	13–21 April 2014	(Egypt) Ramy Ashour
British Open 2014	England	Hull	World Series Platinum	$150,000	12–18 May 2014	(France) Grégory Gaultier
Hong Kong Open 2014	Hong Kong	Hong Kong	World Series Platinum	$150,000	26–31 August 2014	(Egypt) Mohamed El Shorbagy
US Open 2014	United States	Philadelphia	World Series Gold	$115,000	13–18 October 2014	(Egypt) Mohamed El Shorbagy
World Championship 2014	Qatar	Doha	World Series Platinum	$325,000	14–21 November 2014	(Egypt) Ramy Ashour

== World Series Standings 2014 ==
Performance Table Legend
10	1st Round	15	2nd Round
25	Quarterfinalist	40	Semifinalist
65	Runner-up	100	Winner

Top 16 World Series Standings 2014
Rank	Player	Number of Tournament	Tournament of Champions	Windy City Open	El Gouna International	British Open	Hong Kong Open	US Open	World Championship	Total Points
Rank	Player	Number of Tournament	USA (United States)	USA (United States)	EGY (Egypt)	ENG (England)	HKG (Hong Kong)	USA (United States)	QAT (Qatar)	Total Points
1	(Egypt) Mohamed El Shorbagy	7	40	40	65	40	100	100	65	450
2	(France) Grégory Gaultier	7	65	100	40	100	65	40	40	450
3	(Egypt) Ramy Ashour	4	-	65	100	40	-	-	100	305
4	(Egypt) Amr Shabana	6	100	15	40	25	-	65	25	270
5	(England) Nick Matthew	5	25	40	-	65	-	40	40	210
6	(Germany) Simon Rösner	7	25	25	15	10	25	25	15	140
7	(England) Peter Barker	6	25	25	25	10	25	-	10	120
8	(Spain) Borja Golán	6	-	15	15	10	40	10	25	115
9	(Egypt) Tarek Momen	6	15	15	15	15	40	-	15	115
10	(Egypt) Omar Mosaad	6	10	15	25	15	-	25	15	105
11	(England) James Willstrop	4	40	25	-	25	10	-	-	100
12	(Australia) Cameron Pilley	7	15	10	10	10	10	15	25	95
13	(France) Mathieu Castagnet	7	15	15	10	25	10	10	10	95
14	(India) Saurav Ghosal	7	10	25	10	10	15	10	15	95
15	(England) Daryl Selby	5	25	-	25	15	25	-	5	95
16	(Egypt) Fares Dessouky	5	-	-	10	25	15	25	15	90

== See also ==
- PSA World Tour 2014
- WSA World Series 2014
- Official Men's Squash World Ranking
