= El Gouna International 2014 =

- 3rd El Gouna International

Details
- Event name: El Gouna International Squash Open 2014
- Location: El Gouna Egypt
- Venue: Abu Tig Marina
- Website www.elgounasquashopen.com

Men's Winner
- Category: World Series Gold
- Prize money: $115,000
- Year: World Tour 2014

The El Gouna International 2014 is the men's edition of the 2014 El Gouna International, which is a PSA World Series event Gold (Prize money : 115 000 $). The event took place at the Abu Tig Marina in El Gouna in Egypt from 13 April to 18 April. Ramy Ashour won his second El Gouna International trophy, beating Mohamed El Shorbagy in the final.

== Prize money and ranking points ==
For 2014, the prize purse was $115,000. The prize money and points breakdown is as follows:

Prize Money El Gouna International (2014)
Event	W	F	SF	QF	2R	1R
Points (PSA)	2015	1325	805	490	290	145
Prize money	$17,500	$11,500	$7,000	$4,250	$2,500	$1,250

== Seeds ==
1. (France) Grégory Gaultier (semifinals)
2. (Egypt) Ramy Ashour (champion)
3. (Egypt) Mohamed El Shorbagy (final)
4. (Spain) Borja Golán (second round)
5. (Egypt) Amr Shabana (semifinals)
6. (Egypt) Karim Darwish (quarterfinals)
7. (England) Peter Barker (quarterfinals)
8. (England) Daryl Selby (quarterfinals)

== Draw and results ==
1* 2* 3* First round 4* 5* 6*
1	(France) Grégory Gaultier	11	8	11	11	11
(India) Saurav Ghosal	9	11	13	4	8
Q	(Malaysia) Ong Beng Hee	8	6	9
(South Africa) Stephen Coppinger	11	11	11
(Switzerland) Nicolas Müller	18	15	11
(England) Chris Simpson	16	13	2
WC	(Egypt) Zahed Mohamed	11	9	2	11	6
8	(England) Daryl Selby	9	11	11	8	11
7	(England) Peter Barker	11	11	11
Q	(Finland) Henrik Mustonen	4	3	6
(Australia) Cameron Pilley	9	12	9
(Egypt) Marwan El Shorbagy	11	14	11
(France) Mathieu Castagnet	11	9	8	7
Q	(Egypt) Mazen Hesham	7	11	11	11
(Colombia) Miguel Á. Rodríguez	5	12	11	9
3	(Egypt) Mohd El Shorbagy	11	14	8	11
4	(Spain) Borja Golán	13	14	11	7
(England) Adrian Grant	15	12	6	0	rtd
Q	(Hong Kong) Max Lee	6	12	7	5
(Egypt) Omar Mosaad	11	10	11	11
(Egypt) Tarek Momen	11	11	9	7	11
Q	(Egypt) Fares Dessouky	9	11	11	11	5
(Egypt) Karim Abdel Gawad	9	10	7
5	(Egypt) Amr Shabana	11	12	11
6	(Egypt) Karim Darwish	11	8	11	11
Q	(Egypt) Mohd Ali Anwar Reda	6	11	4	8
Q	(Egypt) Omar Abdel Meguid	11	10	9	10
(Netherlands) Laurens Jan Anjema	9	12	11	12
(Germany) Simon Rösner	11	11	11
Q	(France) Grégoire Marche	7	6	8
(Finland) Olli Tuominen	9	8	6
2	(Egypt) Ramy Ashour	11	11	11

1* Second round 2* 3*
1	(France) Grégory Gaultier	11	11	11
(South Africa) Stephen Coppinger	6	4	5
(Switzerland) Nicolas Müller	9	9	5
8	(England) Daryl Selby	11	11	11
7	(England) Peter Barker	11	11	11
(Egypt) Marwan El Shorbagy	8	9	8
Q	(Egypt) Mazen Hesham	4	4	8
3	(Egypt) Mohd El Shorbagy	11	11	11
4	(Spain) Borja Golán	11	5	8	9
(Egypt) Omar Mosaad	8	11	11	11
(Egypt) Tarek Momen	3	8	7
5	(Egypt) Amr Shabana	11	11	11
6	(Egypt) Karim Darwish	7	11	6	14	11
(Netherlands) Laurens Jan Anjema	11	9	11	12	4
(Germany) Simon Rösner	13	8	6
2	(Egypt) Ramy Ashour	15	11	11

1* Quarter finals 2*
1	(France) Grégory Gaultier	11	11	12
8	(England) Daryl Selby	3	2	10
7	(England) Peter Barker	8	6	11	3
3	(Egypt) Mohd El Shorbagy	11	11	3	11
(Egypt) Omar Mosaad	10	11	4	8
5	(Egypt) Amr Shabana	12	8	11	11
6	(Egypt) Karim Darwish	7	0	rtd
2	(Egypt) Ramy Ashour	11	4

Semi finals
1	(France) Grégory Gaultier	6	16	9	10
3	(Egypt) Mohd El Shorbagy *	11	14	11	12
Final
3	(Egypt) Mohd El Shorbagy	7	10	11	8
2	(Egypt) Ramy Ashour *	11	12	8	11
5	(Egypt) Amr Shabana	9	5	5
2	(Egypt) Ramy Ashour *	11	11	11

== See also ==
- El Gouna International
- PSA World Series 2014

Preceded by Windy City Open; United States (Chicago); 2014	PSA World Series 2014; El Gouna International; Egypt (El Gouna); 2014	Succeeded by British Open; England (Hull); 2014
