= Grasshopper Cup =

Squash tournament

Details
- Event name: Grasshopper Cup
- Location: Zürich, Switzerland
- Website gc-cup.com

Men's Winner
- Category: PSA World Tour Gold

The Grasshopper Cup is a squash tournament held in Zürich, Switzerland, between March and May. It is part of the PSA World Tour. The event has been played since 1979.

== Past Results ==
=== Men ===
Year	Winner	Runner-up	score
1979	(Zimbabwe) Norman Ingledew	(South Africa) Colin Fletcher	
1980	(England) Paul Hendry		
1981	(Sweden) Leif Leiner		
1982	(Australia) David Fear		
1983	(South Africa) Mike Sherren		
1984	(South Africa) Kevin Karam	(England) Andrew Marshall	
1985	(Egypt) Gamal El Amir		
1986	(Egypt) Gamal El Amir		
1987	(England) Neil Harvey		
1988	(England) Neil Harvey		
1989	(England) Geoff Williams		
1990	(Australia) Chris Robertson	(Australia) Rodney Martin	
1991	(Australia) Chris Dittmar	(Pakistan) Jahangir Khan	
1992	(Australia) Chris Dittmar	(England) Peter Marshall	
1993	(Australia) Chris Dittmar	(Australia) Rodney Eyles	
1994	(Pakistan) Jansher Khan	(England) Peter Marshall	5–1, 5–1
1995	(Scotland) Martin Heath	(Germany) Stefan Leifels	3–0
1996	(Australia) Glen Wilson	(Australia) Paul Steel	9-6, 9-4, 9-2
1997	(Wales) Alex Gough	(Scotland) John White	6-9, 9-2, 9-4, 5-9, 9-3
1998	(England) Stephen Meads	(France) Thierry Lincou	12-15, 12-15, 15-13, 15-6, 15-7
1999	(Finland) Olli Tuominen	(England) Bradley Ball	10-15, 13-15, 17-15, 15-3, 15-9
2000	(Australia) John Williams	(Finland) Olli Tuominen	15-8, 15-7, 15-1
2001	(England) Mark Cairns	(Switzerland) Lars Harms	15-8, 15-9, 15-4
2002–2011 No competition
2012	(England) Daryl Selby	(Switzerland) Nicolas Müller	12-10, 11-7, 8-11, 11-4
2013	(Botswana) Alister Walker	(England) Daryl Selby	11-4, 5-11, 12-10, 9-11, 11-2
2014	(Egypt) Amr Shabana	(Egypt) Tarek Momen	11-6, 11-9, 4-11, 8-11, 11-8
2015	(France) Grégory Gaultier	(Germany) Simon Rösner	11-8, 11-3, 11-9
2016	(Egypt) Marwan El Shorbagy	(France) Grégory Gaultier	6-11, 13-11, 11-9, 9-11, 11-6
2017	(France) Grégory Gaultier	(Egypt) Ali Farag	11-8, 11-9, 14-12
2018	(Egypt) Ramy Ashour	(Egypt) Mohamed El Shorbagy	11-8, 11-9, 11-6
2019	(Egypt) Mohamed El Shorbagy	(Egypt) Tarek Momen	11-8, 13-11, 11-8
2020-2022 Cancelled due to COVID-19 pandemic in Switzerland
2023	(Egypt) Mostafa Asal	(Egypt) Marwan ElShorbagy	13–11, 11–2, 11–5
2024	(Egypt) Karim Abdel Gawad	(Wales) Joel Makin	11–6, 9–11, 11–8, 11–6
2025	(Egypt) Ali Farag	(Peru) Diego Elías	13–11, 12–14, 11–4, 11–5
2026	(Egypt) Karim Gawad	(France) Victor Crouin	11-8, 11-4, 11-5

=== Women ===
Year	Winner	Runner-up	score
1994	(England) Cassie Jackman	(Australia) Sarah Fitz-Gerald	5–3, 5–2
2023	(Egypt) Nour El Sherbini	(Egypt) Hania El Hammamy	9–11, 11–9, 10–12, 11–3, 11–4
2024	(Egypt) Nour El Sherbini	(Egypt) Hania El Hammamy	11–6, 11–7, 11–9
2025	(Egypt) Nouran Gohar	(Malaysia) Sivasangari Subramaniam	11–7, 12–10, 11–9
2026	(Malaysia) Sivasangari Subramaniam	(Japan) Satomi Watanabe	15-13, 5-11, 5-11, 11-7, 11-8
