= Dubai Open Squash =

Dubai Open

Details
- Event name: Dubai Open Squash
- Location: Dubai United Arab Emirates
- Venue: Nad Al Sheba Sport Complex
- Website www.a2squash.com

Men's PSA World Tour
- Category: International 25
- Prize money: $25,000
- Most recent champion(s): (Egypt) Karim Abdel Gawad

The Dubai Open Squash is a men's squash tournament held in Dubai, United Arab Emirates in March. It is part of the PSA World Tour. The event was founded in 2014.

== Past Results ==
Year	Champion	Runner-up	Score in final
2018	(Egypt) Mohamed El Shorbagy	(Egypt) Ali Farag	9-11, 11-3, 11-9, 11-8
2017	(Egypt) Mohamed El Shorbagy	(England) James Willstrop	12-10, 11-9, 11-8
2016	(France) Gregory Gaultier	(Australia) Cameron Pilley	11-4, 11-5, 8-11, 11-6
2015	No competition		
2014	(Egypt) Karim Abdel Gawad	(England) Chris Simpson	5-11, 11-6, 11-8, 6-11, 11-4
