= 2014 Men's British Open Squash Championship =

British Open
- 74th Men's British Open

Details
- Event name: Allam British Open 2014
- Location: (United Kingdom) Hull, England
- Venue: Sports Arena
- Dates: 12–20 May 2014
- Website www.britishopensquash.net

Men's Winner
- Category: World Series Platinum
- Prize money: $150,000
- Year: World Tour 2014

The Men's Allam British Open 2014 is the men's edition of the 2014 British Open Squash Championships, which is a PSA World Series event Platinum (Prize money : 150,000 $). The event took place at the Sports Arena in Hull in England from 12–20 May 2014. Grégory Gaultier won his second British Open trophy, beating Nick Matthew in the final.

== Prize money and ranking points ==
For 2014, the prize purse was $150,000. The prize money and points breakdown is as follows:

Prize Money British Open (2014)
Event	W	F	SF	QF	2R	1R
Points (PSA)	2625	1725	1050	640	375	190
Prize money	$23,625	$15,525	$9,450	$5,740	$3,375	$1,690

== Seeds ==
1. (England) Nick Matthew (final)
2. (France) Grégory Gaultier (champion)
3. (Egypt) Ramy Ashour (semifinals)
4. (Egypt) Mohamed El Shorbagy (semifinals)
5. (England) James Willstrop (quarterfinals)
6. (Spain) Borja Golán (first round)
7. (Egypt) Amr Shabana (quarterfinals)
8. (Egypt) Karim Darwish (second round)

== Draw and results ==
1* 2* First round 3* 4*
1	(England) Nick Matthew	11	11	11
WC	(England) Joe Lee	9	3	6
(India) Saurav Ghosal	11	8	5	6
(England) Daryl Selby	7	11	11	11
(Egypt) Karim Abdel Gawad	11	3	7	11	3^{r}
Q	(Egypt) Fares Dessouky	8	11	11	7	9
Q	(Malaysia) Ong Beng Hee	12	7	11	8
8	(Egypt) Karim Darwish	14	11	8	11
6	(Spain) Borja Golán	11	7	5	11	6
(France) Mathieu Castagnet	8	11	11	1	11
Q	(Hong Kong) Leo Au	5	10	12	5
(England) Adrian Grant	11	12	10	11
(Egypt) Tarek Momen	9	11	11	13
Q	(Finland) Olli Tuominen	11	5	6	11
(Botswana) Alister Walker	6	12	9	5
4	(Egypt) Mohd El Shorbagy	11	10	11	11
3	(Egypt) Ramy Ashour	12	11	11
Q	(Egypt) Marwan El Shorbagy	10	4	8
(England) Peter Barker	5	5	rtd
(Netherlands) Laurens Jan Anjema	11	11
(South Africa) Stephen Coppinger	8	10	6
(Egypt) Omar Mosaad	11	12	11
(Germany) Simon Rösner	11	5	8	9
5	(England) James Willstrop	5	11	11	11
7	(Egypt) Amr Shabana	11	11	7	11
Q	(Hong Kong) Max Lee	6	5	11	8
Q	(France) Grégoire Marche	9	3	11	11	11
(Australia) Cameron Pilley	11	11	9	9	4
(Colombia) Miguel Á. Rodríguez	10	6	11	11	11
Q	(Switzerland) Nicolas Müller	12	11	9	7	5
(England) Chris Simpson	4	3	2
2	(France) Grégory Gaultier	11	11	11

1* 2* Second round 3* 4*
1	(England) Nick Matthew	11	10	11	5	11
(England) Daryl Selby	7	12	3	11	4
Q	(Egypt) Fares Dessouky	12	11	2	2	11
8	(Egypt) Karim Darwish	10	6	11	11	9
(France) Mathieu Castagnet	7	11	6	11	11
(England) Adrian Grant	11	7	11	9	6
(Egypt) Tarek Momen	2	3	9
4	(Egypt) Mohd El Shorbagy	11	11	11
3	(Egypt) Ramy Ashour	9	11	11	11
(Netherlands) Laurens Jan Anjema	11	1	9	4
(Egypt) Omar Mosaad	5	11	11	4
5	(England) James Willstrop	11	13	9	11
7	(Egypt) Amr Shabana	11	9	11	11
Q	(France) Grégoire Marche	5	11	4	6
(Colombia) Miguel Á. Rodríguez	3	7	9
2	(France) Grégory Gaultier	11	11	11

1* Quarter finals 2*
1	(England) Nick Matthew	11	12	11
Q	(Egypt) Fares Dessouky	4	10	9
(France) Mathieu Castagnet	7	11	6	6
4	(Egypt) Mohd El Shorbagy	11	9	11	11
3	(Egypt) Ramy Ashour	11	11	11
5	(England) James Willstrop	5	5	7
7	(Egypt) Amr Shabana	2	rtd
2	(France) Grégory Gaultier	11

Semi finals
1	(England) Nick Matthew *	4	14	3	11	11
4	(Egypt) Mohd El Shorbagy	11	12	11	7	8
Final
1	(England) Nick Matthew	3	6	2
2	(France) Grégory Gaultier *	11	11	11
3	(Egypt) Ramy Ashour	7	10	11	7
2	(France) Grégory Gaultier *	11	12	3	11

== See also ==
- 2014 Men's World Open Squash Championship
- 2014 Women's British Open Squash Championship

Preceded by El Gouna International; Egypt (El Gouna); 2014	PSA World Series 2014; British Open; England (Hull); 2014	Succeeded by Hong Kong Open; Hong Kong; 2014
