= Muhd Asyraf Azan =

Malaysian squash player (born 1988)

Asyraf Azan
Personal information
- Full name: Muhammad Asyraf Azan
- Born: 3 October 1988 (age 37) Selangor, Malaysia
- Height: 1.80 m (5 ft 11 in)
- Weight: 72 kg (159 lb)

Sport
- Country: Malaysia
- Handedness: Left Handed
- Turned pro: 2007
- Coached by: Peter Genever
- Retired: Active
- Racquet used: Wilson

Men's singles
- Highest ranking: No. 53 (December, 2012)
- Current ranking: No. 109 (January, 2016)
- Title: 3
- Tour final: 6
- Updated on January, 2016

Muhammad Asyraf Azan (born 3 October 1988), known as Muhd Asyraf Azan or Asyraf Azan, is a professional squash player who represented Malaysia. He reached a career-high world ranking of World No. 53 in December 2012.
