= Abierto Mexicano de Raquetas =

Details
- Event name: Abierto Mexicano de Raquetas
- Location: Huixquilucan Mexico
- Website www.abiertomexicanoderaquetas.com

Men's PSA World Tour
- Category: International 70
- Prize money: $70,000
- Most recent champion(s): (Egypt) Mohamed El Shorbagy
- Current: Men's Abierto Mexicano de Raquetas 2014

Women's PSA World Tour
- Category: Tour 15
- Prize money: $15,000
- Most recent champion(s): (United States) Olivia Blatchford

The Abierto Mexicano de Raquetas is a squash tournament held in Toluca, Mexico. It is part of the PSA World Tour and the WSA World Tour. The event was established in 2012

== Past results ==
=== Men's ===
Year	Champion	Runner-up	Score in final
2014	(Egypt) Mohamed El Shorbagy	(Egypt) Marwan El Shorbagy	11-3, 11-3, 11-2
2013	(France) Grégory Gaultier	(Egypt) Mohamed El Shorbagy	7-11, 11-8, 3-11, 11-6, 11-6
2012	(France) Grégory Gaultier	(Egypt) Omar Mosaad	11-6, 11-8, 11-5

=== Women's ===
Year	Champion	Runner-up	Score in final
2014	(United States) Olivia Blatchford	(South Africa) Siyoli Waters	11-9, 11-9, 12-10
2013	(Egypt) Yathreb Adel	(England) Victoria Lust	11-8, 11-4, 15-13
2012	(England) Sarah-Jane Perry	(Denmark) Line Hansen	11-6, 11-5, 8-11, 13-11
