= Jaymie Haycocks =

English squash player (born 1983)

Personal information
- Born: 12 November 1983 (age 42) Shrewsbury, England
- Height: 1.80 m (5 ft 11 in)
- Weight: 78 kg (172 lb)
- Website: www.squashtourist.com

Sport
- Country: England
- Turned pro: 2007
- Coached by: Keir Worth, Jason Morris, Robert Owen
- Retired: Active
- Racquet used: Harrow

Men's singles
- Highest ranking: No. 50 (May 2014)
- Current ranking: No. 100 (July 2019)
- Title: 5
- Tour final: 14
- Updated on July 2019

Jaymie Haycocks (born 12 November 1983 in Shrewsbury) is a professional squash player who represents England. He reached a career-high world ranking of World No. 50 in May 2014. He studied at Bridgnorth Endowed School and then Sport, Physical Education and Community Studies at Birmingham University.
