= Mohamed Abouelghar =

Egyptian squash player (born 1993)

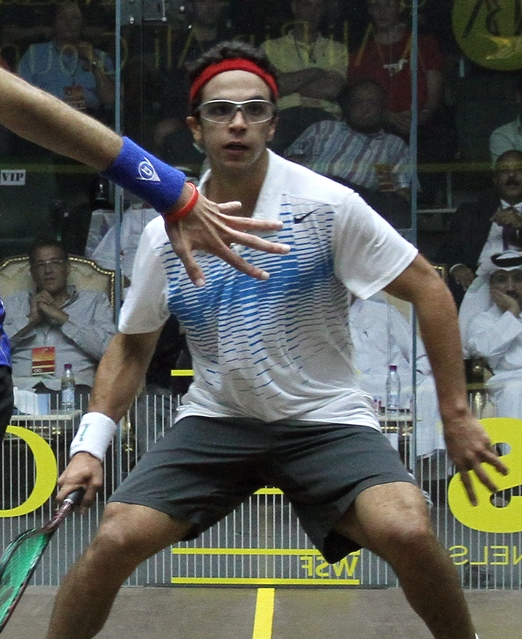
- Abouelghar at the 2012 World Squash Junior Championship Final

Personal information
- Born: October 1, 1993 (age 32) Cairo, Egypt
- Height: 1.78 m (5 ft 10 in)
- Weight: 70 kg (154 lb)

Sport
- Country: Egypt
- Handedness: Right Handed
- Turned pro: 2009
- Coached by: Akram Yousef; Mohamed Farid; Samy Farag
- Retired: Active
- Racquet used: Prince

Men's singles
- Highest ranking: No. 7 (June 2019)
- Current ranking: No. 17 (November 2025)
- Title: 11
Medal record
Men's squash
Representing Egypt
World Team Championships
Gold medal – first place	2019 Washington D.C.	Team

Mohamed Abouelghar (born 1 October 1993) is a professional squash player who represents Egypt. He reached a career-high ranking of World No. 7 in June 2019.

== Biography ==
As part of the Egypt team, he won the 2019 men's gold medal at the World Team Championships held in Washington D.C.

In November 2025, he won his 11th PSA title after securing victory in the China Open during the 2025–26 PSA Squash Tour.

== Titles and Finals ==
=== Major Finals (1) ===
Major tournaments include:

- PSA World Championships
- PSA World Tour Finals
- Top-tier PSA World Tour tournaments (Platinum/World Series/Super Series)

Year/Season	Tournament	Opponent	Result	Score
2018-19	PSA World Tour Finals	Karim Abdel Gawad	Loss (1)	10-12 6-11 11-5 11-8 10–12
