= 2013 in squash sport =

This article lists the results for the sport of Squash in 2013.

== 2013 PSA World Series ==
- (United States) Tournament of Champions (18–24 January): (Egypt) Ramy Ashour defeated (France) Grégory Gaultier 7–11, 6–11, 12–10, 11–3, 11–1.
- (United States) North American Open (25 February – 2 March): (Egypt) Ramy Ashour defeated (England) Nick Matthew 11–7, 11–8, 5–11, 11–7.
- Kuwait PSA Cup (8–14 March): (Egypt) Ramy Ashour defeated (England) James Willstrop 6–11, 11–8, 11–3, 11–3.
- (United Kingdom) British Open (20–26 May): (Egypt) Ramy Ashour defeated (France) Grégory Gaultier 7–11, 11–4, 11–7, 11–8.
- (United States) US Open (11–18 October): (France) Grégory Gaultier defeated (England) Nick Matthew 11–4, 11–5, 11–5.
- Qatar Classic (10–15 November): (Egypt) Mohamed El Shorbagy defeated (England) Nick Matthew 11–5, 5–11, 11–6, 6–11, 11–4.
- Hong Kong Open (3–8 December): (England) Nick Matthew defeated (Spain) Borja Golán 11–1, 11-8, 5-11, 11-5.

=== PSA World Championship ===
- (England) PSA World Championship (26 October - 3 November): (England) Nick Matthew defeated (France) Grégory Gaultier 11-9, 11-9, 11-13, 7-11, 11-2.

== 2013 WSA World Series ==
- (Malaysia) Kuala Lumpur Open (27–31 March): (England) Laura Massaro defeated (England) Alison Waters 11–9, 11–7, 11–6.
- (United Kingdom) British Open (21–26 May): (England) Laura Massaro defeated (Malaysia) Nicol David 11–4, 3–11, 12–10, 11–8.
- (Malaysia) Malaysian Open (12–15 September): (Malaysia) Nicol David defeated (Egypt) Raneem El Weleily 13–11, 11–13, 7–11, 11–8, 11–5.
- (United States) US Open (13–18 October): (Malaysia) Nicol David defeated (England) Laura Massaro 11–8, 11–7, 11–6.
- Hong Kong Open (4–8 December): (Malaysia) Nicol David defeated (Egypt) Raneem El Weleily 11–7, 11–7, 12-10.

=== WSF World Team Championships ===
- Men's World Team Championships
  - (gold) England, (silver) Egypt, (bronze) France
