= 2013 Men's British Open Squash Championship =

British Open
- 73rd Men's British Open

Details
- Event name: Allam British Open 2013
- Location: (United Kingdom) Hull, England
- Venue: KC Stadium
- Dates: 20–26 May 2013
- Website www.britishopensquash.net

Men's Winner
- Category: World Series Platinum
- Prize money: $150,000
- Year: World Tour 2013

The Men's Allam British Open 2013 is the men's edition of the 2013 British Open Squash Championships, which is a PSA World Series event Platinum (Prize money : 150,000 $). The event took place at the KC Stadium in Hull in England from 20–26 May 2013. Ramy Ashour won his first British Open trophy, beating Grégory Gaultier in the final.

== Prize money and ranking points ==
For 2013, the prize purse was $150,000. The prize money and points breakdown is as follows:

Prize Money British Open (2013)
| Event | W | F | SF | QF | 2R | 1R |
| Points (PSA) | 2625 | 1725 | 1050 | 640 | 375 | 190 |
| Prize money | $23,625 | $15,525 | $9,450 | $5,740 | $3,375 | $1,690 |

== Seeds ==
1. (Egypt) Ramy Ashour (champion)
2. (England) Nick Matthew (semifinals)
3. (England) James Willstrop (semifinals)
4. (France) Grégory Gaultier (final)
5. (Egypt) Karim Darwish (quarterfinals)
6. (Egypt) Mohamed El Shorbagy (second round)
7. (England) Peter Barker (second round)
8. (Spain) Borja Golán (quarterfinals)

== Draw and results ==
1* 2* First round 3* 4*
1 | (Egypt) Ramy Ashour | 11 | 11 | 11
(Egypt) Omar Mosaad | 4 | 9 | 6
Q | (England) Chris Simpson | 7 | 11 | 11 | 11
(Switzerland) Nicolas Müller | 11 | 6 | 9 | 4
LL | (England) Joe Lee | 10 | 4 | 11 | 8
Q | (Egypt) Karim Abdel Gawad | 12 | 11 | 2 | 11
(England) Adrian Grant | 4 | 2 | 11 | 9
8 | (Spain) Borja Golán | 11 | 11 | 8 | 11
6 | (Egypt) Mohd El Shorbagy | 11 | 11 | 11
(Colombia) Miguel Á. Rodríguez | 6 | 7 | 6
(Australia) Cameron Pilley | 11 | 11 | 14
(Malaysia) Ong Beng Hee | 1 | 8 | 12
(Germany) Simon Rösner | 11 | 12 | 8 | 11
WC | (England) Adrian Waller | 4 | 10 | 11 | 6
(South Africa) Steve Coppinger | 10 | 8 | 11 | 10
3 | (England) James Willstrop | 12 | 11 | 9 | 12
4 | (France) Grégory Gaultier | 11 | 11 | 11
(Botswana) Alister Walker | 6 | 9 | 1
Q | (England) Jonathan Kemp | 9 | 6 | 6
(India) Saurav Ghosal | 11 | 11 | 11
(Egypt) Tarek Momen | 11 | 11 | 11
Q | (Egypt) Marwan El Shorbagy | 9 | 9 | 4
Q | (Egypt) Mohd Ali Anwar Reda | 10 | 9 | 4
7 | (England) Peter Barker | 12 | 11 | 11
5 | (Egypt) Karim Darwish | 11 | 11 | 11
Q | (Egypt) Andrew Wagih | 4 | 9 | 3
(Finland) Olli Tuominen | 7 | 9 | 11
(England) Daryl Selby | 11 | 11 | 13
(Netherlands) Laurens Jan Anjema | 11 | 11 | 10 | 11
Q | (Australia) Ryan Cuskelly | 3 | 6 | 12 | 6
Q | (Finland) Henrik Mustonen | 8 | 7 | 3
2 | (England) Nick Matthew | 11 | 11 | 11

1* Second round 2*
1 | (Egypt) Ramy Ashour | 11 | 11 | 11
Q | (England) Chris Simpson | 2 | 4 | 9
Q | (Egypt) Karim Abdel Gawad | 11 | 9 | 8 | 4
8 | (Spain) Borja Golán | 9 | 11 | 11 | 11
6 | (Egypt) Mohd El Shorbagy | 15 | 11 | 9 | 6 | 11
(Australia) Cameron Pilley | 13 | 4 | 11 | 11 | 13
(Germany) Simon Rösner | 9 | 1 | 6
3 | (England) James Willstrop | 11 | 11 | 11
4 | (France) Grégory Gaultier | 11 | 11 | 11 | 11
(India) Saurav Ghosal | 8 | 13 | 7 | 0
(Egypt) Tarek Momen | 9 | 11 | 11 | 11
7 | (England) Peter Barker | 11 | 4 | 6 | 9
5 | (Egypt) Karim Darwish | 11 | 11 | 11
(England) Daryl Selby | 9 | 5 | 6
(Netherlands) Laurens Jan Anjema | 6 | 3 | 4
2 | (England) Nick Matthew | 11 | 11 | 11

Quarter finals
1 | (Egypt) Ramy Ashour | 11 | 11 | 11
8 | (Spain) Borja Golán | 7 | 4 | 7
(Australia) Cameron Pilley | 11 | 11 | 12 | 6 | 2
3 | (England) James Willstrop | 9 | 9 | 14 | 11 | 11
4 | (France) Grégory Gaultier | 11 | 11 | 15
(Egypt) Tarek Momen | 8 | 7 | 13
5 | (Egypt) Karim Darwish | 6 | 2 | 10
2 | (England) Nick Matthew | 11 | 11 | 12

Semi finals
1 | (Egypt) Ramy Ashour * | 11 | 11 | 13
3 | (England) James Willstrop | 2 | 9 | 11
Final
1 | (Egypt) Ramy Ashour * | 7 | 11 | 11 | 11
4 | (France) Grégory Gaultier | 11 | 4 | 7 | 8
4 | (France) Grégory Gaultier * | 9 | 11 | 11 | 11
2 | (England) Nick Matthew | 11 | 7 | 3 | 6

== See also ==
- 2013 Men's World Open Squash Championship
- 2013 Women's British Open Squash Championship

| Preceded by Kuwait PSA Cup; Kuwait (Kuwait City); 2013 | PSA World Series 2013; British Open; England (Hull); 2013 | Succeeded by US Open; United States (Philadelphia) 2013 |
