= 2018 in squash sport =

This article lists the results for the sport of Squash in 2018.

== 2017–18 PSA World Series ==
- October 7 – 14: 2017 United States Open in Philadelphia
  - Men: (Egypt) Ali Farag defeated (Egypt) Mohamed El Shorbagy, 12–10, 11–9, 10–8.
  - Women: (Egypt) Nour El Tayeb defeated (Egypt) Raneem El Weleily, 8–11, 11–4, 5–11, 11–7, 11–7.
- October 29 – November 3: 2017 Qatar Classic in Doha
  - (Egypt) Mohamed El Shorbagy defeated (Egypt) Tarek Momen, 11–8, 10–12, 11–7, 11–7.
- November 14 – 19: 2017 Hong Kong Open in Hong Kong
  - Men: (Egypt) Mohamed El Shorbagy defeated (Egypt) Ali Farag, 11–6, 5–11, 11–4, 7–11, 11–3.
  - Women: (Egypt) Nour El Sherbini defeated (Egypt) Raneem El Weleily, 11–5, 11–8, 11–5.
- January 7 – 12: Saudi PSA Women's Masters in (Saudi Arabia) Riyadh
  - Women: (Egypt) Nour El Sherbini defeated (Egypt) Raneem El Weleily, 11–7, 11–8, 13–11.
- January 18 – 25: 2018 Tournament of Champions in (United States) New York City
  - Men: (Germany) Simon Rösner defeated (Egypt) Tarek Momen, 11–8, 11–9, 6–11, 11–5.
  - Women: (Egypt) Nour El Sherbini defeated (Egypt) Nour El Tayeb, 2–11, 11–6, 4–11, 11–7, 11–7.
- February 22 – 28: 2018 Windy City Open in (United States) Chicago
  - Men: (Egypt) Mohamed El Shorbagy defeated (Egypt) Marwan El Shorbagy, 11–8, 11–8, 11–6.
  - Women: (Egypt) Nour El Tayeb defeated (New Zealand) Joelle King, 11–8, 10–12, 11–13, 11–9, 12–10.
- April 20 – 27: El Gouna International in (Egypt) El Gouna
  - Men: (Egypt) Marwan El Shorbagy defeated (Egypt) Ali Farag, 11–8, 11–5, 11–4.
  - Women: (Egypt) Raneem El Weleily defeated (Egypt) Nour El Sherbini, 5–11, 11–8, 11–3, 14–12.
- May 15–20: British Open Squash Championships in (England) Kingston upon Hull
  - Men: (Colombia) Miguel Ángel Rodríguez defeated (Egypt) Mohamed El Shorbagy, 11-7, 6-11, 8-11, 11-2, 11-9
  - Women: (Egypt) Nour El Sherbini defeated (Egypt) Raneem El Weleily, 11–6, 11–9, 14–12.
- June 5–9: World Series Squash Finals in (United Arab Emirates) Dubai
  - Men: (Egypt) Mohamed El Shorbagy defeated (Egypt) Ali Farag, 9-11, 11-3, 11-9, 11-8
  - Women: (Egypt) Nour El Sherbini defeated (Egypt) Raneem El Weleily, 11-5, 9-11, 11-8, 11-5

== World and Continental Championships ==
- March 21 – 25: 2018 Asian Squash Team Championships in (South Korea) Cheongju
  - Team winners: Hong Kong (m) / Hong Kong (f)
- March 24 – April 1: 2018 European U19 Individual & Team Championships in (Poland) Bielsko-Biała
  - U19 winners: (France) Victor Crouin (m) / (England) Lucy Turmel (f)
  - Team winners: England
- April 25 – 28: 2018 European Team Championships Division 3 in (Latvia) Riga
  - Team winners: Sweden (m) / Ukraine (f)
- May 2 – 5: European Team Championship Divisions 1 & 2 in (Poland) Wrocław
  - Division 1: France (m) / England (f)
  - Division 2: Switzerland (m) / Spain (f)
- May 9 – 13: Under 15/17 Team European Championships in (Sweden) Malmö
  - U15 winners: England, 2nd: Spain, 3rd: France
  - U17 winners: England, 2nd: France, 3rd: Spain
- August 29 – September 1: European Individual Closed Championships in (Poland) Wrocław
  - Men: (Spain) Borja Golán defeated (England) George Parker, 8–11, 11–4, 10–12, 13–11, 11–6
  - Women: (England) Millie Tomlinson defeated (France) Coline Aumard, 11–9, 12–10, 4–11, 11–7
- September 6 – 12: 2018 World University Squash Championship in (United Kingdom) Birmingham
  - Men: (United Kingdom) Joshua Masters defeated (Hong Kong) Yip Tsz Fung, 8–11 11–8, 11-2, 11–5.
  - Women: (United Kingdom) Lily Rhian Taylor defeated (South Africa) Alexa Pienaar, 11–7, 11–8, 11–6.
- September 19 – 22: European Club Championships in (Netherlands) Eindhoven
  - Men: (Germany) Paderborner SC defeated (England) Edgbaston Priory Club, 3–2. (Czech Republic) Viktoria Brno Sportprofit took third place.
  - Women: (England) Edgbaston Priory Club defeated (Switzerland) SC Fricktal, 2–0. (Scotland) Edinburgh Sports Club took third place.
