= 2013 PSA World Series Finals =

PSA World Series Finals 2013
- 20th PSA World Series Finals

Details
- Event name: PSA World Series Finals 2013
- Location: Richmond, Virginia, United States
- Venue: Westwood Club
- Website www.worldseriesfinals.com

Men's Winner
- Category: PSA World Series Finals
- Prize money: $110,000
- Year: World Series 2013

The 2013 PSA World Series Finals is the men's edition of the 2013 PSA World Series Finals (Prize money : $110 000). The top eight players in the PSA World Series 2013 were qualified for the event, which took place at the Westwood Club in Richmond, Virginia in the United States from March 15 to March 19, 2014. Ramy Ashour won his first PSA World Series Finals trophy, beating Mohamed El Shorbagy in the final.

== Seeds ==
1. (England) Nick Matthew (semifinals)
2. (Egypt) Ramy Ashour (champion)
3. (France) Grégory Gaultier (semifinals)
4. (England) James Willstrop (first round)
5. (Egypt) Mohamed El Shorbagy (final)
6. (Spain) Borja Golán (first round)
7. (Egypt) Tarek Momen (first round)
8. (Germany) Simon Rösner (first round)

== Group stage results ==
=== Pool A ===
(England) Nick Matthew	11	11	-	7	2	(Germany) Simon Rösner
(France) Grégory Gaultier	11	11	-	4	9	(Spain) Borja Golán

(England) Nick Matthew	7	4		-	11	11		(France) Grégory Gaultier
(Germany) Simon Rösner	10	11	11	-	12	6	6	(Spain) Borja Golán

(England) Nick Matthew	11	11	-	8	9	(Spain) Borja Golán
(France) Grégory Gaultier	11	10	-	13	12	(Germany) Simon Rösner

Rank	Player	Match	Win	Low	Points
1	(France) Grégory Gaultier	3	2	1	4
2	(England) Nick Matthew	3	2	1	4
3	(Germany) Simon Rösner	3	2	1	4
4	(Spain) Borja Golán	3	0	3	0

=== Pool B ===
(Egypt) Ramy Ashour	5	5	-	11	11	(Egypt) Mohamed El Shorbagy
(England) James Willstrop	11	11	-	8	8	(Egypt) Tarek Momen

(Egypt) Ramy Ashour	7	11	12	-	11	7	10	(England) James Willstrop
(Egypt) Mohamed El Shorbagy	11	15	10	-	5	17	12	(Egypt) Tarek Momen

(Egypt) Ramy Ashour	11	11	-	6	6	(Egypt) Tarek Momen
(England) James Willstrop	9	7	-	11	11	(Egypt) Mohamed El Shorbagy

Rank	Player	Match	Win	Low	Points
1	(Egypt) Mohamed El Shorbagy	3	2	1	4
2	(Egypt) Ramy Ashour	3	2	1	4
3	(England) James Willstrop	3	1	2	2
4	(Egypt) Tarek Momen	3	1	2	2

== Draw and results ==
Semi finals
1stA	(France) Grégory Gaultier	11	8	7
2ndB	(Egypt) Ramy Ashour *	13	11	11
2ndA	(England) Nick Matthew	11	7	6	11	3
1stB	(Egypt) Mohd El Shorbagy *	9	11	11	4	11

Final
(Egypt) Ramy Ashour *	15	11	11	11
(Egypt) Mohamed El Shorbagy	17	7	4	5

== See also ==
- PSA World Tour 2013
- PSA World Series 2013
- PSA World Series Finals
