= 2015 Canary Wharf Squash Classic =

Canary Wharf Squash Classic 2015
- 12th Canary Wharf Squash Classic

Details
- Event name: Canary Wharf Squash Classic 2015
- Location: London, England, United Kingdom
- Venue: East Wintergarden
- Website www.cwsquash.com

Men's Winner
- Category: World Tour International 50
- Prize money: $50,000
- Year: World Tour 2015

The Canary Wharf Squash Classic 2015 is the 2015 Canary Wharf Squash Classic, which is a tournament of the PSA World Tour event International (Prize money : 50 000 $). The event took place at the East Wintergarden in London in England from 23 March to 27 March. Nick Matthew won his fifth Canary Wharf Squash Classic trophy, beating Simon Rösner in the final.

== Prize money and ranking points ==
For 2015, the prize purse was $50,000. The prize money and points breakdown is as follows:

Prize Money Canary Wharf Squash Classic (2015)
Event	W	F	SF	QF	1R
Points (PSA)	875	575	350	215	125
Prize money	$8,075	$5,525	$3,615	$2,230	$1,275

== Seeds ==
1. (England) Nick Matthew (Champion)
2. (England) Peter Barker (Semifinals)
3. (Spain) Borja Golán (Quarterfinals)
4. (Germany) Simon Rösner (Final)
5. (England) James Willstrop (Quarterfinals)
6. (England) Daryl Selby (Semifinals)
7. (Hong Kong) Max Lee (Quarterfinals)
8. (Egypt) Fares Dessouky (Quarterfinals)

== Draw and results ==
1* First round
1	(England) Nick Matthew	11	11	11
WC	(England) Eddie Charlton	4	5	7
(England) Adrian Waller	3	4	5
8	(Egypt) Fares Dessouky	11	11	11
6	(England) Daryl Selby	11	17	9	11
Q	(England) Joe Lee	7	15	11	7
(Netherlands) Laurens Jan Anjema	7	4	12	7
3	(Spain) Borja Golán	11	11	10	11
4	(Germany) Simon Rösner	11	11	11
Q	(France) Lucas Serme	7	5	8
Q	(Egypt) Omar Abdel Meguid	0	9	7
5	(England) James Willstrop	11	11	11
7	(Hong Kong) Max Lee	9	11	11	8	11
(Egypt) Mazen Hesham	11	3	9	11	9
Q	(Egypt) Mohamed Abouelghar	7	5	8
2	(England) Peter Barker	11	11	11

1* Quarter finals
1	(England) Nick Matthew	11	10	11	11
8	(Egypt) Fares Dessouky	7	12	7	8
6	(England) Daryl Selby	11	10	11	3	14
3	(Spain) Borja Golán	8	12	7	11	12
4	(Germany) Simon Rösner	11	11	11
5	(England) James Willstrop	7	3	3
7	(Hong Kong) Max Lee	4	7	8
2	(England) Peter Barker	11	11	11

Semi finals *
1	(England) Nick Matthew	12	11	11
6	(England) Daryl Selby	10	6	9
4	(Germany) Simon Rösner	3	12	11	12
2	(England) Peter Barker	11	10	5	10

Final
1	(England) Nick Matthew	11	11	11
4	(Germany) Simon Rösner	4	9	7

== See also ==
- 2015 PSA World Tour
- Canary Wharf Squash Classic
- 2015 Men's British Open
