= 2016 Canary Wharf Squash Classic =

Canary Wharf Squash Classic 2016
- 13th Canary Wharf Squash Classic

Details
- Event name: Canary Wharf Squash Classic 2016
- Location: London, England, United Kingdom
- Venue: East Wintergarden
- Website www.cwsquash.com

Men's Winner
- Category: World Tour International 70
- Prize money: $70,000
- Year: World Tour 2016

The Canary Wharf Squash Classic 2016 is the 2016 edition of the Canary Wharf Squash Classic, which is a tournament of the PSA World Tour event International (Prize money : 70 000 $). The event took place at the East Wintergarden in London in England from 7 March to 11 March. Mathieu Castagnet won his first Canary Wharf Squash Classic trophy, beating Omar Mosaad in the final.

== Prize money and ranking points ==
For 2016, the prize purse was $70,000. The prize money and points breakdown is as follows:

Prize Money Canary Wharf Squash Classic (2016)
Event	W	F	SF	QF	1R
Points (PSA)	875	575	350	215	125
Prize money	$11,875	$8,125	$5,310	$3,280	$1,875

== Seeds ==
1. (Egypt) Omar Mosaad (final)
2. (Germany) Simon Rösner (quarterfinals)
3. (France) Mathieu Castagnet (champion)
4. (Egypt) Marwan El Shorbagy (first round)
5. (England) James Willstrop (quarterfinals)
6. (Australia) Cameron Pilley (semifinals)
7. (England) Daryl Selby (quarterfinals)
8. (Spain) Borja Golán (semifinals)

== Draw and results ==
First round
1	(Egypt) Omar Mosaad *	13	11	9	11
(England) Chris Simpson	11	5	11	7
Q	(England) Declan James	11	3	9	4
7	(England) Daryl Selby *	8	11	11	11
8	(Spain) Borja Golán *	11	12	11
WC	(England) Ben Coleman	4	10	2
(Egypt) Fares Dessouky *	4	11	11	9	11
4	(Egypt) Marwan El Shorbagy	11	5	7	11	8
3	(France) Mathieu Castagnet *	11	11	11
Q	(England) Joe Lee	5	8	5
(New Zealand) Paul Coll	12	10	8
5	(England) James Willstrop *	14	12	11
6	(Australia) Cameron Pilley *	11	11	11
Q	(Egypt) Mohd Ali Anwar Reda	8	6	6
Q	(England) Charles Sharpes	6	6	6
2	(Germany) Simon Rösner *	11	11	11

Quarter finals
1	(Egypt) Omar Mosaad *	11	8	11	4	11
7	(England) Daryl Selby	4	11	3	11	5
8	(Spain) Borja Golán *	11	5	11	11
(Egypt) Fares Dessouky	8	11	5	5
3	(France) Mathieu Castagnet *	11	11	11
5	(England) James Willstrop	6	6	9
6	(Australia) Cameron Pilley *	11	11
2	(Germany) Simon Rösner	7	5	rtd

Semi finals
1	(Egypt) Omar Mosaad *	8	11	11	11	11
8	(Spain) Borja Golán	11	13	6	9	5
3	(France) Mathieu Castagnet *	11	11	11	13
6	(Australia) Cameron Pilley	9	13	1	11

Final
1	(Egypt) Omar Mosaad	11	7	8	5
3	(France) Mathieu Castagnet *	6	11	11	11

== See also ==
- 2016 PSA World Tour
- Canary Wharf Squash Classic
- 2016 Men's British Open
