= Kuwait PSA Cup 2013 =

- 9th Kuwait PSA Cup

Details
- Event name: Kuwait PSA Cup 2013
- Location: Kuwait City Kuwait
- Website www.kuwaitpsacup.com

Men's Winner
- Category: World Series Platinum
- Prize money: $190,000
- Year: World Tour 2013

The Kuwait PSA Cup 2013 is the men's edition of the 2013 Kuwait PSA Cup, which is a PSA World Series event Platinum (Prize money : 190 000 $). The event took place in Kuwait City in Kuwait from 8 to 14 March. Ramy Ashour won his third Kuwait PSA Cup trophy by defeating James Willstrop in the final.

== Prize money and ranking points ==
For 2013, the prize purse was $190,000. The prize money and points breakdown is as follows:

Prize Money Kuwait PSA Cup (2013)
Event	W	F	SF	QF	3R	2R	1R
Points (PSA)	2625	1725	1050	640	375	190	115
Prize money	$30,150	$19,350	$11,700	$6,975	$4,050	$2,025	$900

== Seeds ==
1. (Egypt) Ramy Ashour (champion)
2. (England) Nick Matthew (third round)
3. (England) James Willstrop (final)
4. (France) Grégory Gaultier (semifinals)
5. (Egypt) Karim Darwish (quarterfinals)
6. (Egypt) Mohamed El Shorbagy (semifinals)
7. (Egypt) Amr Shabana (quarterfinals)
8. (England) Peter Barker (quarterfinals)
9. (Egypt) Omar Mosaad (third round)
10. (Spain) Borja Golán (third round)
11. (Egypt) Tarek Momen (third round)
12. (England) Tom Richards (second round)

== Draw and results ==
=== Finals ===
* Quarter finals *
1	(Egypt) Ramy Ashour	9	2	11	11	11
7	(Egypt) Amr Shabana	11	11	8	5	4
4	(France) Grégory Gaultier	11	11
8	(England) Peter Barker	3	2	rtd
3	(England) James Willstrop	11	11	4	11
5	(Egypt) Karim Darwish	9	4	11	3
6	(Egypt) Mohd El Shorbagy	11	11	11
13	(England) Daryl Selby	4	4	9

Semi finals *
1	(Egypt) Ramy Ashour	11	11	11
4	(France) Grégory Gaultier	8	5	2
3	(England) James Willstrop	11	11	11
6	(Egypt) Mohamed El Shorbagy	5	10	8

Final
1	(Egypt) Ramy Ashour *	6	11	11	11
3	(England) James Willstrop	11	8	3	3

=== Top half ===
==== Section 1 ====
Round 1							Round 2						Round 3 *
							1	(Egypt) Ramy Ashour	11	8	11	11
	(New Zealand) Campbell Grayson	11	4	11	7	8	21	(Switzerland) Nicolas Müller	7	11	5	2
21	(Switzerland) Nicolas Müller	6	11	8	11	11							1	(Egypt) Ramy Ashour	11	9	11	11
(Egypt) Omar Abdel Meguid		11	7	14	7								16	(Germany) Simon Rösner	9	11	8	3
(Hong Kong) Leo Au		5	11	16	11			(Hong Kong) Leo Au	5	5	3
							16	(Germany) Simon Rösner	11	11	11

==== Section 2 ====
Round 1							Round 2					Round 3
							9	(Egypt) Omar Mosaad	11	11	11
(England) Jonathan Kemp		13	9	11	12			(England) Jonathan Kemp	6	9	9
(England) Chris Simpson		11	11	6	10							9	(Egypt) Omar Mosaad	5	11	10	4
23	(Finland) Olli Tuominen	9	11	13	9	11						7	(Egypt) Amr Shabana	11	7	12	11
	(Denmark) Kristian Frost Olesen	11	6	11	11	8	23	(Finland) Olli Tuominen	8	8	5
							7	(Egypt) Amr Shabana	11	11	11

==== Section 3 ====
Round 1							Round 2					Round 3
							8	(England) Peter Barker	11	11	11
	(England) Joe Lee	9	11	7	11	4	24	(Egypt) Karim Abdel Gawad	8	3	8
24	(Egypt) Karim Abdel Gawad	11	8	11	6	11						8	(England) Peter Barker	11	11	11
(Colombia) Miguel Ángel Rodriguez		6	6	11	11	4						15	(Netherlands) Laurens Jan Anjema	6	4	8
(Egypt) Karim Ali Fathi		11	11	8	8	11		(Egypt) Karim Ali Fathi	6	5	1
							15	(Netherlands) Laurens Jan Anjema	11	11	11

==== Section 4 ====
Round 1							Round 2							Round 3
							10	(Spain) Borja Golán	6	8	12	11	11
	(Egypt) Marwan El Shorbagy	11	11	4	5		18	(India) Saurav Ghosal	11	11	10	6	8
18	(India) Saurav Ghosal	13	4	11	11									10	(Spain) Borja Golán	6	3	8
20	(South Africa) Stephen Coppinger	11	9	9	11	6								4	(France) Grégory Gaultier	11	11	11
	(Kuwait) Abdullah Al Muzayen	9	11	11	5	11		(Kuwait) Abdullah Al Muzayen	9	5	6
							4	(France) Grégory Gaultier	11	11	11

=== Bottom half ===
==== Section 1 ====
Round 1							Round 2					Round 3 *
							3	(England) James Willstrop	11	11	11
(Scotland) Alan Clyne		13	8	9	8			(France) Grégoire Marche	9	5	5
(France) Grégoire Marche		11	11	11	11							3	(England) James Willstrop	11	11	11
19	(Australia) Cameron Pilley	11	12	11	5	11						11	(Egypt) Tarek Momen	7	5	4
	(Malaysia) Mohd Nafiizwan Adnan	7	10	13	11	4	19	(Australia) Cameron Pilley	8	6	9
							11	(Egypt) Tarek Momen	11	11	11

==== Section 2 ====
Round 1				Round 2						Round 3
				12	(England) Tom Richards	11	8	6	3
(England) Adrian Waller	8	12	4		(France) Mathieu Castagnet	9	11	11	11
(France) Mathieu Castagnet	11	14	11								(France) Mathieu Castagnet	10	7	11	6
(Australia) Zac Alexander	11	12	11							5	(Egypt) Karim Darwish	11	11	5	11
(New Zealand) Martin Knight	6	10	9		(Australia) Zac Alexander	4	6	11	3
				5	(Egypt) Karim Darwish	11	11	8	11

==== Section 3 ====
Round 1							Round 2							Round 3
							6	(Egypt) Mohd El Shorbagy	8	11	11	8	13
(Egypt) Mohd Ali Anwar Reda		11	11	11	11			(Egypt) Mohd Ali Anwar Reda	11	7	9	11	11
(Hong Kong) Max Lee		2	13	7	8									6	(Egypt) Mohd El Shorbagy	11	11	13
22	(Malaysia) Ong Beng Hee	11	8	4	13	11								22	(Malaysia) Ong Beng Hee	7	6	11
	(Egypt) Omar Abdel Aziz	5	11	11	11	7	22	(Malaysia) Ong Beng Hee	9	11	11	11
							14	(Botswana) Alister Walker	11	5	6	4

==== Section 4 ====
Round 1							Round 2					Round 3
							13	(England) Daryl Selby	11	11	11
(Australia) Ryan Cuskelly		12	11	4	11	11		(Australia) Ryan Cuskelly	5	5	4
(India) Siddharth Suchde		14	8	11	8	9						13	(England) Daryl Selby	11	11	12
17	(England) Adrian Grant	11	11	11								2	(England) Nick Matthew	6	6	10
WC	(Kuwait) Yousif Nizar Saleh	3	1	7			17	(England) Adrian Grant	7	8	9
							2	(England) Nick Matthew	11	11	11

== See also ==
- Kuwait PSA Cup
- PSA World Tour 2013
- PSA World Series 2013

Preceded by North American Open; USA (Richmond); 2013	PSA World Series 2013; Kuwait PSA Cup; Kuwait (Kuwait City); 2013	Succeeded by British Open; England (Hull); 2013
