= Men's Hong Kong squash Open 2013 =

Cathay Pacific Hong Kong Open 2013
- 27th PSA Hong Kong Open

Details
- Event name: Cathay Pacific Sun Hung Kai Financial Hong Kong Open 2013
- Location: Hong Kong
- Venue: Hong Kong Squash Centre – Tsim Sha Tsui

Men's Winner
- Category: World Series Platinum
- Prize money: $150,000
- Year: World Tour 2013

The Men's Cathay Pacific Hong Kong Open 2013 was the men's edition of the 2013 Hong Kong Open, which is a PSA World Series event Platinum (Prize money: $150,000). The event took place in Hong Kong from 3 to 8 December. Nick Matthew won his first Hong Kong Open trophy, beating Borja Golán in the final.

== Prize money and ranking points ==
For 2013, the prize purse was $150,000. The prize money and points breakdown is as follows:

Prize Money Hong Kong Open (2013)
Event	W	F	SF	QF	2R	1R
Points (PSA)	2625	1725	1050	640	375	190
Prize money	$23,625	$15,525	$9,450	$5,740	$3,375	$1,690

== Seeds ==
1. (Egypt) Ramy Ashour (quarter-finals)
2. (France) Grégory Gaultier (semi-finals)
3. (England) James Willstrop (semi-finals)
4. (England) Nick Matthew (champion)
5. (Egypt) Mohamed El Shorbagy (quarter-finals)
6. (Egypt) Amr Shabana (quarter-finals)
7. (Spain) Borja Golán (final)
8. (Egypt) Tarek Momen (quarter-finals)

== Draw and results ==
1* 2* First round 3* 4*
1	(Egypt) Ramy Ashour	11	11	11
Q	(Malaysia) Mohd Nafi. Adnan	8	4	5
Q	(England) Adrian Waller	7	11	11	11
(Australia) Cameron Pilley	11	6	5	5
(South Africa) Stephen Coppinger	8	10	5
(England) Chris Simpson	11	12	11
(Malaysia) Ong Beng Hee	5	6	5
7	(Spain) Borja Golán	11	11	11
5	(Egypt) Mohd El Shorbagy	11	11	11
WC	(Hong Kong) Leo Au	11	1	5
(Egypt) Marwan El Shorbagy	11	10	11	11
(Australia) Ryan Cuskelly	8	12	7	8
(Germany) Simon Rösner	11	11	11
(England) Tom Richards	5	8	8
(England) Adrian Grant	1	3	1
3	(England) James Willstrop	11	11	11
4	(England) Nick Matthew	11	11	13
(England) Daryl Selby	5	6	11
Q	(France) Lucas Serme	5	4	9
(India) Saurav Ghosal	11	11	11
(Switzerland) Nicolas Müller	11	11	6	5	15
Q	(France) Grégoire Marche	8	7	11	11	13
Q	(France) Mathieu Castagnet	6	13	5
6	(Egypt) Amr Shabana	11	15	11
8	(Egypt) Tarek Momen	6	11	14	11
Q	(Hong Kong) Max Lee	11	8	12	4
Q	(Egypt) Omar Abdel Meguid	8	9	7
(Finland) Olli Tuominen	11	11	11
(Egypt) Karim Abdel Gawad	12	7	9	11	11
Q	(England) Joe Lee	10	11	11	7	8
(Netherlands) Laurens Jan Anjema	8	2	12	7
2	(France) Grégory Gaultier	11	11	10	11

1* Second round 2* 3*
1	(Egypt) Ramy Ashour	11	11	11
Q	(England) Adrian Waller	7	5	7
(England) Chris Simpson	10	8	4
7	(Spain) Borja Golán	12	11	11
5	(Egypt) Mohd El Shorbagy	11	11	10	11
(Egypt) Marwan El Shorbagy	3	6	12	7
(Germany) Simon Rösner	9	9	8
3	(England) James Willstrop	11	11	11
4	(England) Nick Matthew	3	11	11	11
(India) Saurav Ghosal	11	5	4	8
(Switzerland) Nicolas Müller	10	4	11	7
6	(Egypt) Amr Shabana	12	11	8	11
8	(Egypt) Tarek Momen	13	11	11	16
(Finland) Olli Tuominen	11	13	4	14
(Egypt) Karim Abdel Gawad	7	9	4
2	(France) Grégory Gaultier	11	11	11

Quarter finals *
1	(Egypt) Ramy Ashour	11	11	1	0	rtd
7	(Spain) Borja Golán	5	5	11	7
5	(Egypt) Mohd El Shorbagy	11	11	9	9	18
3	(England) James Willstrop *	9	9	11	11	20
4	(England) Nick Matthew	9	11	11	11
6	(Egypt) Amr Shabana	11	4	8	8
8	(Egypt) Tarek Momen	8	11	9	13	5
2	(France) Grégory Gaultier	11	8	11	11	11

Semi-finals *
7	(Spain) Borja Golán	11	11	11
3	(England) James Willstrop	6	3	9
Final
7	(Spain) Borja Golán	1	8	11	5
4	(England) Nick Matthew *	11	11	5	11
4	(England) Nick Matthew	11	11	11	8	11
2	(France) Grégory Gaultier	13	4	4	11	3

== See also ==
- Hong Kong Open (squash)
- Women's Hong Kong squash Open 2013
- 2013 Men's World Open Squash Championship
- PSA World Series 2013

Preceded by Qatar Classic; Qatar (Doha); 2013	PSA World Series 2013; Hong Kong Open; Hong Kong; 2013	Succeeded by Tournament of Champions; United States (New York) 2014
