= Alwatan and Asnan International =

Details
- Event name: Alwatan and Asnan International Tournament
- Location: South Surra, Kuwait

Men's PSA World Tour
- Category: International 50
- Prize money: $50,000
- Most recent champion(s): (Germany) Simon Rösner
- Current: Alwatan and Asnan International 2013

The Alwatan and Asnan International is a men's squash tournament held in South Surra, Kuwait.

The event is part of the PSA World Tour. It was established in 2013.

== Past Results ==
Year	Champion	Runner-up	Score in final
2013	(Germany) Simon Rösner	(Spain) Borja Golán	11-4, 11-5, 12-10
