= 2018 Men's PSA World Series Finals =

PSA World Series Finals
- 23rd Men's PSA World Series Finals
- Location: Dubai, United Arab Emirates
- Venue: Emirates Golf Club
- Date: 5–9 June 2018
- Website worldseriesfinals.com
- Prize money: $160,000

Results
- Champion: Mohamed El Shorbagy (EGY)
- Runner-up: Ali Farag (EGY)
- Semi-finalists: Simon Rösner (GER); Nick Matthew (ENG)

The 2018 Men's PSA World Series Finals is the men's edition of the PSA World Series Finals (Prize money : $160 000). The top 8 players in the 2017–18 PSA World Series are qualified for the event. The event will take place in Dubai in the United Arab Emirates from 5 to 9 June 2018.

Mohamed El Shorbagy won its second PSA World Series Finals title in a row after defeating fellow countryman Ali Farag 3–1 in the Final.

== Seeds ==
1. (Egypt) Mohamed El Shorbagy
2. (Egypt) Ali Farag
3. (Germany) Simon Rösner
4. (Egypt) Tarek Momen
5. (Colombia) Miguel Ángel Rodríguez
6. (France) Grégory Gaultier
7. (Egypt) Karim Abdel Gawad
8. (England) Nick Matthew

== Group stage results ==
Times are Gulf Standard Time

=== Group A ===
Date	Time	Player 1	Player 2	Score
5 June	20:45	Mohamed El Shorbagy (EGY)	Miguel Ángel Rodríguez (COL)	11–8, 9–11, 11–7
5 June	22:15	Nick Matthew (ENG)	Tarek Momen (EGY)	11–8, 11–9
6 June	20:45	Mohamed El Shorbagy (EGY)	Tarek Momen (EGY)	11–8, 2–11, 11–9
6 June	22:15	Nick Matthew (ENG)	Miguel Ángel Rodríguez (COL)	11–9, 9–11, 12–10
7 June	20:45	Mohamed El Shorbagy (EGY)	Nick Matthew (ENG)	6–11, 6–11
7 June	22:15	Tarek Momen (EGY)	Miguel Ángel Rodríguez (COL)	11–5, 8–11, 11–8

=== Standings ===
Player	Pld	W	L	Games
Nick Matthew (ENG)	3	3	0	6
Mohamed El Shorbagy (EGY)	3	2	1	4
Tarek Momen (EGY)	3	1	2	3
Miguel Ángel Rodríguez (COL)	3	0	3	3

=== Group B ===
Date	Time	Player 1	Player 2	Score
5 June	15:45	Simon Rösner (GER)	Karim Abdel Gawad (EGY)	12–10, 11–6
5 June	17:15	Ali Farag (EGY)	Grégory Gaultier (FRA)	11–9, 11–8
6 June	15:45	Karim Abdel Gawad (EGY)	Grégory Gaultier (FRA)	9–11, 11–8, 11–4
6 June	17:15	Ali Farag (EGY)	Simon Rösner (GER)	11–7, 9–11, 3–11
7 June	15:45	Simon Rösner (GER)	Grégory Gaultier (FRA)	11–8, 12–10
7 June	17:15	Ali Farag (EGY)	Karim Abdel Gawad (EGY)	11–5, 11–5

=== Standings ===
Player	Pld	W	L	Games
Simon Rösner (GER)	3	3	0	6
Ali Farag (EGY)	3	2	1	5
Karim Abdel Gawad (EGY)	3	1	2	2
Grégory Gaultier (FRA)	3	0	3	1

== Semifinals & Final ==
Semi finals (8 June)
8	Nick Matthew (ENG)	5	7
2	Ali Farag (EGY)	11	11
1	Mohamed El Shorbagy (EGY)	12	10	11
3	Simon Rösner (GER)	10	12	3

Final (9 June)
2	Ali Farag (EGY)	11	3	9	8
1	Mohamed El Shorbagy (EGY)	9	11	11	11

2018 Men's PSA World Series Finals winner
(Egypt)
Mohamed El Shorbagy
Second title

== See also ==
- 2018 Women's PSA World Series Finals
- 2017–18 PSA World Series
- PSA World Series Finals
- 2017 PSA World Tour
- 2018 PSA World Tour
