= Men's Qatar Classic 2013 =

Qatar Classic 2013
- 13th PSA Qatar Classic

Details
- Event name: Qatar Classic Squash Championship 2013
- Location: Doha, Qatar
- Venue: Aspire Academy
- Website www.squashsite.co.uk/qatar/

Men's Winner
- Category: World Series Platinum
- Prize money: $150,000
- Year: World Tour 2013

The Men's Qatar Classic 2013 is the men's edition of the 2013 Qatar Classic squash tournament, which is a PSA World Series platinum event ($150,000 prize money). The event took place in Doha from 10 November to 15 November. Mohamed El Shorbagy won his first Qatar Classic trophy, beating Nick Matthew in the final.

== Prize money and ranking points ==
For 2013, the prize purse was $150,000. The prize money and points breakdown is as follows:

Prize Money Qatar Classic (2013)
Event	W	F	SF	QF	2R	1R
Points (PSA)	2625	1725	1050	640	375	190
Prize money	$23,625	$15,525	$9,450	$5,740	$3,375	$1,690

== Seeds ==
1. (France) Grégory Gaultier (quarterfinals)
2. (England) James Willstrop (second round)
3. (England) Nick Matthew (final)
4. (Egypt) Karim Darwish (semifinals)
5. (Egypt) Mohamed El Shorbagy (champion)
6. (Egypt) Amr Shabana (quarterfinals)
7. (Spain) Borja Golán (semifinals)
8. (Egypt) Tarek Momen (second round)

== Draw and results ==
1* First round 2*
1	(France) Grégory Gaultier	11	11	11
(Germany) Simon Rösner	9	9	3
Q	(England) Joe Lee	3	3	8
(Australia) Cameron Pilley	11	11	11
(England) Tom Richards	11	11	10	7	12
Q	(Malaysia) Mohd Nafi. Adnan	2	4	12	11	10
(Switzerland) Nicolas Müller	7	7	8
7	(Spain) Borja Golán	11	11	11
6	(Egypt) Amr Shabana	11	11	6	11
(India) Saurav Ghosal	9	6	11	7
Q	(Australia) Ryan Cuskelly	11	11	7	7	6
(South Africa) Stephen Coppinger	7	9	11	11	11
(Colombia) Miguel Á. Rodríguez	11	11	11
Q	(Hong Kong) Max Lee	9	5	9
(Botswana) Alister Walker	8	7	10
3	(England) Nick Matthew	11	11	12
4	(Egypt) Karim Darwish	11	11	10	11
(England) Adrian Grant	6	9	12	8
(Malaysia) Ong Beng Hee	6	9	5
(Egypt) Omar Mosaad	11	11	11
(Egypt) Karim Abdel Gawad	8	11	6	11	11
Q	(Egypt) Mohd Abouelghar	11	4	11	7	9
Q	(Denmark) Kristian Frost Olesen	2	3	3
8	(Egypt) Tarek Momen	11	11	10
5	(Egypt) Mohd El Shorbagy	7	8	11	11	11
(England) Chris Simpson	11	11	7	7	6
Q	(Finland) Olli Tuominen	3	12	8
(Netherlands) Laurens Jan Anjema	11	14	11
(England) Daryl Selby	11	11	11
Q	(France) Grégoire Marche	6	6	3
WC	(Qatar) Abdulla Al-Tamimi	7	9	2
2	(England) James Willstrop	11	11	11

1* Second round 2*
1	(France) Grégory Gaultier	11	11	11
(Australia) Cameron Pilley	9	6	4
(England) Tom Richards	6	7	10
7	(Spain) Borja Golán	11	11	12
6	(Egypt) Amr Shabana	11	11	11
(South Africa) Stephen Coppinger	3	4	5
(Colombia) Miguel Á. Rodríguez	6	7	11
3	(England) Nick Matthew	11	11	13
4	(Egypt) Karim Darwish	11	4	11	11
(Egypt) Omar Mosaad	9	11	6	5
(Egypt) Karim Abdel Gawad	11	5	11	9	12
8	(Egypt) Tarek Momen	9	11	9	11	10
5	(Egypt) Mohd El Shorbagy	11	11	11
(Netherlands) Laurens Jan Anjema	7	6	8
(England) Daryl Selby	11	11	4	9	13
2	(England) James Willstrop	8	5	11	11	11

1* Quarter finals 2*
1	(France) Grégory Gaultier	11	10	6	13
7	(Spain) Borja Golán	7	12	11	15
6	(Egypt) Amr Shabana	10	2^{r}
3	(England) Nick Matthew	12	2
4	(Egypt) Karim Darwish	11	11	11
(Egypt) Karim Abdel Gawad	6	5	7
5	(Egypt) Mohd El Shorbagy	11	7	11	11
(England) Daryl Selby	9	11	4	2

Semi finals
7	(Spain) Borja Golán	8	6	5
3	(England) Nick Matthew *	11	11	11
Final
3	(England) Nick Matthew	5	11	6	11	4
5	(Egypt) Mo. El Shorbagy *	11	5	11	6	11
4	(Egypt) Karim Darwish	7	5	6
5	(Egypt) Mo. El Shorbagy *	11	11	11

== See also ==
- Qatar Classic
- 2013 Men's World Open Squash Championship
- PSA World Tour 2013
- PSA World Series 2013

Preceded by World Championship; England (Manchester); 2013	PSA World Series 2013; Qatar Classic; Qatar (Doha); 2013	Succeeded by Hong Kong Open; Hong Kong; 2013
