= Alwatan and Asnan International 2013 =

International World Tournament

- 1st Alwatan and Asnan International

Details
- Event name: Alwatan and Asnan International Tournament 2013
- Location: South Surra, Kuwait

Men's Winner
- Category: International 50
- Prize money: $50,000
- Year: World Tour 2013

The Alwatan and Asnan International 2013 is the edition of the 2013's Alwatan and Asnan International, which is a tournament of the PSA World Tour event International (Prize money : 50 000 $). The event took place in South Surra in Kuwait from 19 December to 22 December. Simon Rösner won his first Alwatan and Asnan International trophy, beating Borja Golán in the final.

== Prize money and ranking points ==
For 2013, the prize purse was $50,000. The prize money and points breakdown is as follows:

Prize Money Alwatan and Asnan International (2013)
Event	W	F	SF	QF	1R
Points (PSA)	875	575	350	215	125
Prize money	$8,550	$5,850	$3,825	$2,360	$1,350

== Seeds ==
1. (Spain) Borja Golán (final)
2. (England) Daryl Selby (first round)
3. (Egypt) Tarek Momen (quarterfinals)
4. (Germany) Simon Rösner (champion)

== Draw and results ==
First round
1	(Spain) Borja Golán	11	11	8	11
Q	(Egypt) Fares Dessouky	6	4	11	3
Q	(Malaysia) Muhd Asyraf Azan	11	9	8
(Australia) Ryan Cuskelly	13	11	11
(Netherlands) Laurens Jan Anjema	11	11	11
Q	(Egypt) Omar Abdel Aziz	8	7	3
(England) Joe Lee	11	11	5	5	8
3	(Egypt) Tarek Momen	8	7	11	11	11
4	(Germany) Simon Rösner	11	11	11
(Scotland) Alan Clyne	6	8	6
(Egypt) Mazen Hesham	11	11	8	8	9
(Botswana) Alister Walker	8	8	11	11	11
(Hong Kong) Max Lee	11	11	11
Q	(Jordan) Ahmad Al-Saraj	4	9	6
WC	(Kuwait) Abdullah Al Muzayen	11	11	4	6	11
2	(England) Daryl Selby	5	9	11	11	5

Quarter finals
1	(Spain) Borja Golán	11	11	11
(Australia) Ryan Cuskelly	8	5	8
(Netherlands) Laurens Jan Anjema	11	9	11	11
3	(Egypt) Tarek Momen	6	11	8	8
4	(Germany) Simon Rösner	11	11	4	11
(Botswana) Alister Walker	8	8	11	7
(Hong Kong) Max Lee	9	11	10	11	6
WC	(Kuwait) Abdullah Al Muzayen	11	6	12	9	11

Semi finals
1	(Spain) Borja Golán	9	11	11	11
(Netherlands) Laurens Jan Anjema	11	7	5	8
4	(Germany) Simon Rösner	11	11	11
WC	(Kuwait) Abdullah Al Muzayen	2	7	9

Final
1	(Spain) Borja Golán	4	5	10
4	(Germany) Simon Rösner	11	11	12

== See also ==
- PSA World Tour 2013
- Alwatan and Asnan International
