= Men's United States Open (squash) 2013 =

US Open 2013
- 26th PSA U.S. Open

Details
- Event name: Delaware Investments United States Open 2013
- Location: (United States) Philadelphia, Pennsylvania
- Venue: Daskalakis Athletic Center
- Website www.usopensquash.com/philadelphia/

Men's Winner
- Category: World Series Gold
- Prize money: $115,000
- Year: World Tour 2013

The Men's United States Squash Open 2013 was the men's edition of the 2013 United States Open (squash), which is a PSA World Series event Gold(Prize money: $115,000). The event took place at the Daskalakis Athletic Center in Philadelphia, Pennsylvania in the United States from the 13th of October to the 18th October. Grégory Gaultier won his second US Open trophy, beating Nick Matthew in the final.

== Prize money and ranking points ==
For 2013, the prize purse was $115,000, which includes $100,000 of "on-site" prize money and $15,000 for hotel bonus. The on-site prize money and points breakdown is as follows:

Prize Money US Open (2013)
Event	W	F	SF	QF	2R	1R
Points (PSA)	2015	1325	805	490	290	145
Prize money	$17,500	$11,500	$7,000	$4,250	$2,500	$1,250

== Seeds ==
1. (France) Grégory Gaultier (champion)
2. (England) James Willstrop (semifinals)
3. (England) Nick Matthew (final)
4. (Egypt) Karim Darwish (semifinals)
5. (Egypt) Mohamed El Shorbagy (quarterfinals)
6. (England) Peter Barker (quarterfinals)
7. (Spain) Borja Golán (second round)
8. (Egypt) Tarek Momen (second round)

== Draw and results ==
1* First round 2*
1	(France) Grégory Gaultier	12	15	11
WC	(United States) Christopher Gordon	10	13	1
(England) Adrian Waller	11	11	11
(Egypt) Marwan El Shorbagy	8	2	4
(France) Mathieu Castagnet	11	11	8	11
Q	(Canada) Shahier Razik	7	5	11	6
(Canada) Shawn Delierre	3	10^{r}
7	(Spain) Borja Golán	11	8
5	(Egypt) Mohd El Shorbagy	11	12	8	12
(Egypt) Omar Abdel Aziz	2	10	11	10
Q	(Australia) Steven Finitsis	11	11	4	6	8
(Scotland) Alan Clyne	8	6	11	11	11
(France) Grégoire Marche	11	11	11
Q	(Malaysia) Muhd Asyraf Azan	6	4	6
(Australia) Ryan Cuskelly	8	9	11	7
4	(Egypt) Karim Darwish	11	11	9	11
3	(England) Nick Matthew	11	12	14
Q	(Kuwait) Abdullah Al Muzayen	0	10	12
Q	(New Zealand) Campbell Grayson	13	11	13
(Switzerland) Nicolas Müller	11	7	11
(England) Joe Lee	11	11	11
(Finland) Henrik Mustonen	0	5	4
Q	(Egypt) Mohd Abouelghar	9	5	11	5
6	(England) Peter Barker	11	11	4	11
8	(Egypt) Tarek Momen	6	5	11	11	11
Q	(Australia) Matthew Karwalski	11	11	6	4	3
(United States) Julian Illingworth	6	8	4
(Germany) Simon Rösner	11	11	11
(Egypt) Karim Abdel Gawad	8	11	11	11
Q	(England) Eddie Charlton	11	5	7	8
(England) Chris Simpson	7	2	7
2	(England) James Willstrop	11	11	11

1* Second round 2*
1	(France) Grégory Gaultier	11	11	11
(England) Adrian Waller	1	4	7
(France) Mathieu Castagnet	11	9	8	11	11
7	(Spain) Borja Golán	7	11	11	9	8
5	(Egypt) Mohd El Shorbagy	11	11	11
(Scotland) Alan Clyne	6	6	6
(France) Grégoire Marche	5	2	10
4	(Egypt) Karim Darwish	11	11	12
3	(England) Nick Matthew	11	11	11
Q	(New Zealand) Campbell Grayson	5	5	6
(England) Joe Lee	11	2	6	4
6	(England) Peter Barker	8	11	11	11
8	(Egypt) Tarek Momen	7	12	2	9
(Germany) Simon Rösner	11	10	11	11
(Egypt) Karim Abdel Gawad	7	9	4
2	(England) James Willstrop	11	11	11

1* Quarter finals 2*
1	(France) Grégory Gaultier	13	11	11
(France) Mathieu Castagnet	11	8	6
5	(Egypt) Mohd El Shorbagy	9	9	6
4	(Egypt) Karim Darwish	11	11	11
3	(England) Nick Matthew	11	11	12	11
6	(England) Peter Barker	5	4	14	6
(Germany) Simon Rösner	5	2	11	9
2	(England) James Willstrop	11	11	8	11

Semi finals
1	(France) Grégory Gaultier *	11	11	12
4	(Egypt) Karim Darwish	7	4	10
Final
1	(France) Grégory Gaultier *	11	11	11
3	(England) Nick Matthew	4	5	5
3	(England) Nick Matthew *	11	11	11
2	(England) James Willstrop	4	6	5

== See also ==
- United States Open (squash)
- PSA World Series 2013
- Women's United States Open (squash) 2013

Preceded by British Open; England (Hull); 2013	PSA World Series 2013; United States Open; United States (Philadelphia); 2013	Succeeded by World Championship; England (Manchester) 2013
