= Tournament of Champions 2013 =

- 79th Tournament of Champions

Details
- Event name: J. P. Morgan Tournament of Champions 2013
- Location: New York City United States
- Venue: Grand Central Terminal
- Website www.tocsquash.com

Men's Winner
- Category: World Series Gold
- Prize money: $115,000
- Year: World Tour 2013

The Men's J. P. Morgan Tournament of Champions 2013 is the men's edition of the 2013 Tournament of Champions, which is a PSA World Series event Gold (Prize money : 115 000 $). The event took place at the Grand Central Terminal in New York City in the United States from 18 January to 24 January. Ramy Ashour won his third Tournament of Champions trophy, beating Grégory Gaultier in the final.

== Prize money and ranking points ==
For 2013, the prize purse was $115,000. The prize money and points breakdown is as follows:

Prize Money Tournament of Champions (2013)
Event	W	F	SF	QF	2R	1R
Points (PSA)	2015	1325	805	490	290	145
Prize money	$17,500	$11,500	$7,000	$4,250	$2,500	$1,250

== Seeds ==
1. (England) James Willstrop (semifinals)
2. (England) Nick Matthew (semifinals)
3. (France) Grégory Gaultier (final)
4. (Egypt) Ramy Ashour (champion)
5. (England) Peter Barker (first round)
6. (Egypt) Mohamed El Shorbagy (quarterfinals)
7. (Egypt) Karim Darwish (quarterfinals)
8. (Egypt) Omar Mosaad (quarterfinals)

== Draw and results ==
1* 2* First round 3* 4*
1	(England) James Willstrop	11	11	11
(Colombia) Miguel Á. Rodriguez	3	5	5
(Egypt) Tarek Momen	11	11	11
Q	(Canada) Shawn Delierre	1	6	8
(England) Adrian Grant	6	9	11	11	11
(Australia) Cameron Pilley	11	11	4	5	8
(South Africa) Stephen Coppinger	12	11	6	11
5	(England) Peter Barker	10	6	11	1
8	(Egypt) Omar Mosaad	11	7	11	11
(Switzerland) Nicolas Müller	7	11	8	5
(Malaysia) Ong Beng Hee	11	5	11	11
Q	(New Zealand) Campbell Grayson	6	11	3	9
(Germany) Simon Rösner	11	4	11	11
Q	(Pakistan) Yasir Ali Butt	5	11	6	4
Q	(England) Adrian Waller	5	6	10
4	(Egypt) Ramy Ashour	11	11	12
3	(France) Grégory Gaultier	11	11	11
(Egypt) Hisham Ashour	6	2	1
(England) Tom Richards	12	11	11
WC	(United States) Todd Harrity	10	3	6
(Finland) Olli Tuominen	1	9	11	5
Q	(France) Grégoire Marche	11	11	5	11
(Netherlands) Laurens Jan Anjema	4	5	9
6	(Egypt) Mohd El Shorbagy	11	11	11
7	(Egypt) Karim Darwish	11	11	9	11
Q	(Australia) Ryan Cuskelly	7	7	11	4
(India) Saurav Ghosal	13	12	11	11
Q	(Canada) Shahier Razik	13	10	9	9
(Egypt) Amr Shabana	11	11	11
Q	(England) Chris Simpson	5	7	9
LL	(England) Joe Lee	4	11	7	4
2	(England) Nick Matthew	11	8	11	11

* Second round *
1	(England) James Willstrop	11	11	11	11
(Egypt) Tarek Momen	13	8	2	6
(England) Adrian Grant	6	9	11	11	1
(South Africa) Stephen Coppinger	11	11	7	9	11
8	(Egypt) Omar Mosaad	11	11	11
(Malaysia) Ong Beng Hee	8	8	6
(Germany) Simon Rösner	8	8	5
4	(Egypt) Ramy Ashour	11	11	11
3	(France) Grégory Gaultier	11	11	11
(England) Tom Richards	3	6	4
Q	(France) Grégoire Marche	8	9	7
6	(Egypt) Mohd El Shorbagy	11	11	11
7	(Egypt) Karim Darwish	11	11	12
(India) Saurav Ghosal	3	5	10
(Egypt) Amr Shabana	8	6	8
2	(England) Nick Matthew	11	11	11

* Quarter finals *
1	(England) James Willstrop	12	11	11
(South Africa) Stephen Coppinger	10	2	4
8	(Egypt) Omar Mosaad	11	3	10	9
4	(Egypt) Ramy Ashour	4	11	12	11
3	(France) Grégory Gaultier	11	13	13	11
6	(Egypt) Mohd El Shorbagy	9	11	15	4
7	(Egypt) Karim Darwish	5	7	8
2	(England) Nick Matthew	11	11	11

Semi finals
1	(England) James Willstrop	11	8	10	12	4
4	(Egypt) Ramy Ashour *	5	11	12	10	11
Final
4	(Egypt) Ramy Ashour *	7	6	12	11	11
3	(France) Grégory Gaultier	11	11	10	3	1
3	(France) Grégory Gaultier *	11	10	13	11
2	(England) Nick Matthew	8	12	11	3

== See also ==
- PSA World Tour 2013
- Tournament of Champions (squash)

Preceded by PSA World Championship; Qatar (Doha); 2012	PSA World Series 2013; Tournament of Champions; USA (New York); 2013	Succeeded by North American Open; USA (Richmond); 2013
