= Canary Wharf Squash Classic =

Details
- Event name: Canary Wharf Squash Classic
- Location: London, England
- Venue: East Wintergarden
- Website www.canarywharfsquash.com

Men's Winner
- Category: World Tour International 70
- Prize money: $110,000
- Most recent champion(s): (New Zealand) Paul Coll

The Canary Wharf Squash Classic is an annual international squash tournament for male professional players, held at the East Wintergarden in Canary Wharf on the Isle of Dogs, London, England.

The event was first held in 2004, when it was an invitational event involving eight of the world's leading players. The tournament continued in the same format in 2005. In 2006, the Canary Wharf Classic became a Professional Squash Association (PSA) Tour tournament, with qualifying rounds and a main draw of 16 players.

In 2004, the final was a best-of-seven-games match. In 2005, it changed to a best-of-five-games format.

== Past finals ==
Year	Champion	Runner-up	Score in final
2023	(New Zealand) 4 Paul Coll	(Wales) Joel Makin	7-11, 11–6, 11–4, 11-4
2022	(Egypt) 7 Fares Dessouky	(Egypt) 2 Mostafa Asal	11-5, 13–11, 12-10
2021	(New Zealand) 3 Paul Coll	(Egypt) 1 Ali Farag	7-11, 13–11, 11–5, 11-6
2020	(Egypt) 1 Mohamed El Shorbagy	(Egypt) 2 Ali Farag	11–8, 10–12, 11–6, 15–13
2019	(New Zealand) 4 Paul Coll	(Egypt) 3 Tarek Momen	11–8, 12–10, 11–3
2018	(Egypt) 1 Mohamed El Shorbagy	(Egypt) 4 Tarek Momen	11–8, 7–11, 12–10, 9–11, 11–3
2017	(England) 1 Nick Matthew	(Egypt) 4 Fares Dessouky	11–9, 11–7, 10–12, 11–8
2016	(France) 3 Mathieu Castagnet	(Egypt) 1 Omar Mosaad	6–11, 11–7, 11–8, 11–5
2015	(England) 1 Nick Matthew	(Germany) 4 Simon Rösner	11–4, 11–9, 11–7
2014	(England) 1 Nick Matthew	(England) 2 James Willstrop	11–5, 11–5, 11–5
2013	(England) 2 James Willstrop	(England) 4 Peter Barker	11–8, 5–11, 11–4, 11–4
2012	(England) 1 Nick Matthew	(England) 2 James Willstrop	11–7, 11–8, 11–9
2011	(England) 1 Nick Matthew	(England) 4 Peter Barker	5–11, 11–4, 11–1, 11–3
2010	(England) 1 Nick Matthew	(France) 2 Grégory Gaultier	12–10, 6–11, 13–11, 11–3
2009	(Australia) 4 David Palmer	(England) 3 James Willstrop	11–9, 12–10, 8–11, 11–7
2008	(England) 2 James Willstrop	(Australia) 7 Cameron Pilley	9–11, 11–9, 8–11, 11–6, 11–3
2007	(England) 4 James Willstrop	(Scotland) 5 John White	8–11, 11–5, 10–11 (1–3), 11–1, 11–2
2006	(France) 2 Thierry Lincou	(Australia) 1 Anthony Ricketts	11–9, 6–11, 11–7, 7–11, 11–3
2005	(Scotland) 7 John White	(Australia) 8 Anthony Ricketts	4–9, 1–9, 9–2, 9–3, 9–1
2004	(England) James Willstrop	(France) Thierry Lincou	9–7, 9–5, 5–9, 9–4, 9–10, 9–2

== See also ==
- Squash in England
