= Squash at the 2013 World Games =

The Squash competition at the World Games 2013 took place from August 2 to August 4, in Cali in Colombia, at the Canas Gordas Comfenalco Club.

== Schedule ==
All times are Colombian Time (UTC−5)

P	Preliminaries	¼	Quarterfinals	½	Semifinals	B	Bronze medal match	F	Final

Date →	Fri 2			Sat 3			Sun 4	
Event ↓	M	A	E	M	A	E	M	A
Men's singles	P			¼		½	B	F
Women's singles	P			¼		½	B	F

M = Morning session, A = Afternoon session, E = Evening session

== Participating nations ==
- Australia (4)
- Brazil (1)
- Canada (2)
- Colombia (4)
- France (3)
- Germany (3)
- Guyana (1)
- (United Kingdom) Great Britain (4)
- Hungary (2)
- India (3)
- Japan (2)
- Jamaica (1)
- Kuwait (1)
- Malaysia (3)
- Mexico (1)
- Netherlands (1)
- Pakistan (1)
- Peru (1)
- United States (2)

== Medals table ==
* Host nation (Colombia)

Rank	Nation	Gold	Silver	Bronze	Total
1	France (FRA)	1	0	1	2
2	Malaysia (MAS)	1	0	0	1
3	Germany (GER)	0	1	0	1
3	Netherlands (NED)	0	1	0	1
5	Colombia (COL)*	0	0	1	1
Totals (5 entries)		2	2	2	6

== Medals summary ==
Event	Gold	Silver	Bronze
Men's singles	(France) Grégory Gaultier	(Germany) Simon Rösner	(Colombia) Miguel Ángel Rodríguez
Women's singles	(Malaysia) Nicol David	(Netherlands) Natalie Grinham	(France) Camille Serme
