= North American Open 2013 =

- 40th North American Open

Details
- Event name: North American Open 2013
- Location: Richmond, Virginia United States
- Venue: Westwood Club
- Website naosquash.com

Men's Winner
- Category: World Series Gold
- Prize money: $115,000
- Year: World Tour 2013

The North American Open 2013 is the men's edition of the 2013 North American Open, which is a PSA World Series event Gold (prize money: $115 000 ). The event took place at the Westwood Club in Richmond, Virginia in the United States from 25 February to 2 March. Ramy Ashour won his second North American Open trophy, beating Nick Matthew in the final.

== Prize money and ranking points ==
For 2013, the prize purse was $115,000. The prize money and points breakdown is as follows:

Prize money North American Open (2013)
Event	W	F	SF	QF	2R	1R
Points (PSA)	2015	1325	805	490	290	145
Prize money	$17,500	$11,500	$7,000	$4,250	$2,500	$1,250

== Seeds ==
1. (Egypt) Ramy Ashour (champion)
2. (England) Nick Matthew (final)
3. (England) James Willstrop (semifinals)
4. (France) Grégory Gaultier (semifinals)
5. (Egypt) Karim Darwish (quarterfinals)
6. (England) Peter Barker (quarterfinals)
7. (Egypt) Amr Shabana (quarterfinals)
8. (Egypt) Omar Mosaad (second round)

== Draw and results ==
1* 2* First round 3* 4*
1	(Egypt) Ramy Ashour	11	12	11	11
(England) Chris Simpson	4	14	4	6
(Australia) Cameron Pilley	11	11	11
Q	(Egypt) Mohd Ali Anwar Reda	3	5	4
(South Africa) Stephen Coppinger	8	12	5	8
(Germany) Simon Rösner	11	10	11	11
Q	(Canada) Shawn Delierre	11	8	4	8
8	(Egypt) Omar Mosaad	7	11	11	11
5	(Egypt) Karim Darwish	11	10	11	12
Q	(France) Mathieu Castagnet	5	12	9	10
(Egypt) Hisham Ashour	7	11	11	11	11
(India) Saurav Ghosal	11	6	13	9	9
(Colombia) Miguel Á. Rodriguez	11	6	11	11
Q	(Malaysia) Mohd Nafi. Adnan	9	11	8	1
(Scotland) Alan Clyne	4	14	4	6
3	(England) James Willstrop	11	12	11	11
4	(France) Grégory Gaultier	11	11	11
Q	(England) Joe Lee	6	6	7
(England) Adrian Grant	11	9	11	11
WC	(Canada) Shahier Razik	6	11	3	3
(Egypt) Karim Abdel Gawad	11	7	7	11	11
Q	(Pakistan) Yasir Butt	3	11	11	4	7
(Switzerland) Nicolas Müller	8	8	6
7	(Egypt) Amr Shabana	11	11	11
6	(England) Peter Barker	10	11	11	11
Q	(New Zealand) Campbell Grayson	12	4	3	6
(Hong Kong) Max Lee	10	7	5
(Finland) Olli Tuominen	12	11	11
(Egypt) Tarek Momen	11	11	10	19	11
Q	(United States) Chris Gordon	9	7	12	21	5
(Netherlands) Laurens Jan Anjema	4	3	3
2	(England) Nick Matthew	11	11	11

* Second round *
1	(Egypt) Ramy Ashour	11	11	12
(Australia) Cameron Pilley	8	6	10
(Germany) Simon Rösner	4	11	11	9	11
8	(Egypt) Omar Mosaad	11	8	8	11	9
5	(Egypt) Karim Darwish	7	11	9	11	11
(Egypt) Hisham Ashour	11	5	11	8	2
(Colombia) Miguel Á. Rodriguez	7	7	1
3	(England) James Willstrop	11	11	11
4	(France) Grégory Gaultier	11	11	11
(England) Adrian Grant	4	4	5
(Egypt) Karim Abdel Gawad	8	11	3	8
7	(Egypt) Amr Shabana	11	9	11	11
6	(England) Peter Barker	11	11	9	11
(Finland) Olli Tuominen	4	6	11	4
(Egypt) Tarek Momen	7	8	6
2	(England) Nick Matthew	11	11	11

Quarter finals *
1	(Egypt) Ramy Ashour *	11	11	10	11
(Germany) Simon Rösner	7	6	12	8
5	(Egypt) Karim Darwish	w/o
3	(England) James Willstrop
4	(France) Grégory Gaultier	11	11	11
7	(Egypt) Amr Shabana	4	4	5
6	(England) Peter Barker	6	7	5
2	(England) Nick Matthew	11	11	11

Semi finals
1	(Egypt) Ramy Ashour *	11	11	9	11
3	(England) James Willstrop	5	8	11	8
Final
1	(Egypt) Ramy Ashour *	11	11	5	11
2	(England) Nick Matthew	7	8	11	7
4	(France) Grégory Gaultier	6	3	11	7
2	(England) Nick Matthew *	11	11	8	11

== See also ==
- North American Open
- PSA World Series 2013

Preceded by Tournament of Champions; USA (New York); 2013	PSA World Series 2013; North American Open; USA (Richmond); 2013	Succeeded by Kuwait PSA Cup; Kuwait (Kuwait City); 2013
