= 2018 Tournament of Champions =

Tournament of Champions 2018
- 84th Tournament of Champions

Details
- Event name: J. P. Morgan Tournament of Champions 2018
- Location: New York City United States
- Venue: Grand Central Terminal
- Website www.tocsquash.com

Men's Winner
- Category: World Series
- Prize money: $165,000
- Year: World Tour 2018

The Men's J. P. Morgan Tournament of Champions 2018 is the men's edition of the 2018 Tournament of Champions, which is a PSA World Series event (Prize money : 165 000 $). The event took place at the Grand Central Terminal in New York City in the United States from 18 January to 25 January. Simon Rösner won his first Tournament of Champions trophy, beating Tarek Momen in the final.

== Prize money and ranking points ==
For 2018, the prize purse was $165,000. The prize money and points breakdown is as follows:

Prize Money Tournament of Champions (2016)
Event	W	F	SF	QF	2R	1R
Points (PSA)	2625	1725	1050	640	375	190
Prize money	$23,625	$15,525	$9,450	$5,740	$3,375	$1,690

== Seeds ==
1. (France) Grégory Gaultier (semifinals)
2. (Egypt) Mohamed El Shorbagy (second round)
3. (Egypt) Ali Farag (semifinals)
4. (Egypt) Karim Abdel Gawad (second round)
5. (Egypt) Marwan El Shorbagy (second round)
6. (England) Nick Matthew (quarterfinals)
7. (Egypt) Tarek Momen (final)
8. (New Zealand) Paul Coll (second round)

== Draw and results ==
First round
1	(France) Grégory Gaultier *	11	11	11
Q	(United States) Todd Harrity	7	6	8
(India) Saurav Ghosal *	8	11	8	7
(England) Tom Richards	11	5	11	11
(England) James Willstrop *	11	11	11
Q	(Australia) Cameron Pilley	6	8	5
Q	(France) Grégoire Marche	6	8	5
5	(England) Nick Matthew *	11	11	11
7	(Egypt) Marwan El Shorbagy *	11	11	11
(Mexico) César Salazar	7	3	8
Q	(Germany) Simon Rösner	11	9	11	11
(England) Daryl Selby *	4	11	6	7
(Switzerland) Nicolas Müller *	7	9	11	11	11
Q	(England) Adrian Waller	11	11	4	7	5
(Wales) Joel Makin *	12	4	7	7
4	(Egypt) Karim Abdel Gawad	10	11	11	11
3	(Egypt) Ali Farag *	11	7	11	11
Q	(New Zealand) Campbell Grayson	6	11	4	4
WC	(Colombia) Miguel Ángel Rodríguez	14	11	11
(Hong Kong) Tsz Fung Yip *	12	8	5
(Egypt) Ramy Ashour *	11	11	13
(Egypt) Mazen Hesham	5	8	11
(Egypt) Zahed Mohamed	4	6	6
6	(New Zealand) Paul Coll *	11	11	11
8	(Egypt) Tarek Momen *	11	11	9	7	12
(Egypt) Mohamed Abouelghar	5	9	11	11	10
Q	(Peru) Diego Elías	11	11	8	12
(England) Declan James *	8	5	11	10
(Australia) Ryan Cuskelly *	8	11	11	11
(Egypt) Omar Mosaad	11	8	6	9
Q	(Hong Kong) Leo Au	8	6	6
2	(Egypt) Mohamed El Shorbagy *	11	11	11

Second round
1	(France) Grégory Gaultier *	11	11	11
(England) Tom Richards	4	5	5
(England) James Willstrop	8	11	8	6
5	(England) Nick Matthew *	11	8	11	11
7	(Egypt) Marwan El Shorbagy *	11	8	11	13	10
(Germany) Simon Rösner	8	11	4	15	12
(Switzerland) Nicolas Müller	11	11	11	3	11
(Egypt) Karim Abdel Gawad *	6	6	13	11	9
3	(Egypt) Ali Farag *	11	11	11
(Colombia) Miguel Ángel Rodríguez	9	9	6
(Egypt) Ramy Ashour	11	7	11	11
6	(New Zealand) Paul Coll *	4	11	7	4
8	(Egypt) Tarek Momen *	11	11	11
(Peru) Diego Elías	7	5	4
(Australia) Ryan Cuskelly	12	9	11	9	11
2	(Egypt) Mohamed El Shorbagy *	10	11	8	11	6

Quarterfinals
1	(France) Grégory Gaultier *	12	11	12	11
5	(England) Nick Matthew	14	6	10	7
7	(Germany) Simon Rösner *	11	11	13	11
(Switzerland) Nicolas Müller	7	7	15	6
3	(Egypt) Ali Farag *	11	12	7	11
6	(Egypt) Ramy Ashour	7	10	11	5
8	(Egypt) Tarek Momen	11	11	11
2	(Australia) Ryan Cuskelly *	9	7	7

Semifinals
1	(France) Grégory Gaultier *	11	10	8	1
7	(Germany) Simon Rösner	9	12	11	11
Final
7	(Germany) Simon Rösner *	11	11	6	11
2	(Egypt) Tarek Momen	8	9	11	5
3	(Egypt) Ali Farag	3	11	12	11	9
2	(Egypt) Tarek Momen *	11	2	14	6	11

== See also ==
- 2017–18 PSA World Series
- 2018 PSA World Tour
- Women's Tournament of Champions 2018
- Tournament of Champions (squash)

Preceded by	2017–18 PSA World Series; Tournament of Champions; USA (New York); 2018	Succeeded by
