= 2017–18 PSA World Series =

Details
- Event name: 2017–18 PSA World Series
- Website; PSA World Series standings
- Year: PSA World Tour 17–18

The PSA World Series 2017–18 is a series of men's and women's squash tournaments which are part of the Professional Squash Association (PSA) World Tour for the end of 2017 and the start of 2018. The PSA World Series tournaments are some of the most prestigious events on the men's and women's tour. The best-performing players in the World Series events qualify for the annual 2018 Men's PSA World Series Finals and 2018 Women's PSA World Series Finals tournament.

== PSA World Series Ranking Points ==
PSA World Series events also have a separate World Series ranking. Points for this are calculated on a cumulative basis after each World Series event. The top eight players at the end of the calendar year are then eligible to play in the PSA World Series Finals.

Tournament			Ranking Points
Rank	Prize Money US$	Ranking Points	Winner	Runner up	3/4	5/8	9/16	17/32
World Series	$150,000-$350,000	625 points	100	65	40	25	15	10

== Men's ==
=== Tournaments ===
Tournament	Country	Location	Rank	Prize money	Date	2017–18 Winner
U.S. Open 2017	United States	Philadelphia	World Series	$165,000	7–14 October 2017	(Egypt) Ali Farag
Qatar Classic 2017	Qatar	Doha	World Series	$165,000	29 Oct.–3 Nov. 2017	(Egypt) Mohamed El Shorbagy
Hong Kong Open 2017	Hong Kong	Hong Kong	World Series	$165,000	14–19 November 2017	(Egypt) Mohamed El Shorbagy
Tournament of Champions 2018	United States	New York City	World Series	$165,000	18–25 January 2018	(Germany) Simon Rösner
Windy City Open 2018	United States	Chicago	World Series	$250,000	22–28 February 2018	(Egypt) Mohamed El Shorbagy
El Gouna International 2018	Egypt	El Gouna	World Series	$165,000	20–27 April 2018	(Egypt) Marwan El Shorbagy
British Open 2018	England	Hull	World Series	$165,000	15–20 May 2018	(Colombia) Miguel Ángel Rodríguez

=== Standings ===
Performance Table Legend
10	1st Round	15	2nd Round
25	Quarterfinalist	40	Semifinalist
65	Runner-up	**100**	Winner

**Top 16 Men's World Series Standings 2017–18**
Rank	Player	Number of Tournament	US Open	Qatar Classic	Hong Kong Open	Tournament of Champions	Windy City Open	El Gouna International	British Open	Total Points
Rank	Player	Number of Tournament	USA (United States)	QAT (Qatar)	HKG (Hong Kong)	USA (United States)	USA (United States)	EGY (Egypt)	ENG (England)	Total Points
1	(Egypt) **Mohamed El Shorbagy**	7	65	**100**	**100**	15	**100**	40	65	**485**
2	(Egypt) **Ali Farag**	7	**100**	25	65	40	40	65	25	**360**
3	(Egypt) ~~Marwan El Shorbagy~~‡	7	15	25	40	15	65	**100**	25	**285**
4	(Germany) **Simon Rösner**	7	25	40	15	**100**	25	25	25	**255**
5	(Egypt) **Tarek Momen**	7	15	65	25	65	40	25	10	**245**
6	(France) **Grégory Gaultier**	5	–	40	25	40	–	40	40	**185**
6	(Colombia) **Miguel Ángel Rodríguez**	6	10	10	–	15	25	25	**100**	**185**
8	(Egypt) **Karim Abdel Gawad**	7	10	15	40	15	25	25	15	**145**
9	(England) **Nick Matthew**	5	40	25	–	25	15	–	15	**120**
10	(Egypt) Omar Mosaad	7	40	15	10	10	10	15	15	**115**
11	(Peru) Diego Elías	6	25	25	–	15	15	10	10	**100**
12	(Egypt) Mohamed Abouelghar	7	15	10	25	10	10	10	15	**95**
13	(New Zealand) Paul Coll	6	15	10	15	15	10	–	25	**90**
14	(Australia) Ryan Cuskelly	6	10	10	15	25	15	–	10	**85**
14	(Germany) Raphael Kandra	7	10	10	10	0	0	15	40	**85**
14	(Australia) Cameron Pilley	6	10	15	15	10	25	–	10	**85**
14	(Mexico) César Salazar	7	15	10	10	10	10	15	15	**85**

‡Marwan El Shorbagy withdraws to the World Series Finals on 30 May due to a hamstring injury.

Bold – Players qualified for the final

Final tournament	Country	Location	Prize money	Date	2017–18 World Series Champion
PSA World Series Finals 2018	United Arab Emirates	Dubai	$160,000	5–9 June 2018	(Egypt) Mohamed El Shorbagy

== Women's ==
=== Tournaments ===
Tournament	Country	Location	Rank	Prize money	Date	2017–18 Winner
US Open 2017	United States	Philadelphia	World Series	$165,000	7–14 October 2017	(Egypt) Nour El Tayeb
Hong Kong Open 2017	Hong Kong	Hong Kong	World Series	$140,000	14–19 November 2017	(Egypt) Nour El Sherbini
Saudi PSA Masters 2018	Saudi Arabia	Riyadh	World Series	$165,000	7–12 January 2018	(Egypt) Nour El Sherbini
Tournament of Champions 2018	United States	New York City	World Series	$165,000	18–25 January 2018	(Egypt) Nour El Sherbini
Windy City Open 2018	United States	Chicago	World Series	$250,000	22–28 February 2018	(Egypt) Nour El Tayeb
El Gouna International 2018	Egypt	El Gouna	World Series	$165,000	20–27 April 2018	(Egypt) Raneem El Weleily
British Open 2018	England	Hull	World Series	$165,000	15–20 May 2018	(Egypt) Nour El Sherbini

=== Standings ===
Performance Table Legend
10	1st Round	15	2nd Round
25	Quarterfinalist	40	Semifinalist
65	Runner-up	**100**	Winner

**Top 16 Women's World Series Standings 2017–18**
Rank	Player	Number of Tournament	US Open	Hong Kong Open	Saudi Masters	Tournament of Champions	Windy City Open	El Gouna International	British Open	Total Points
Rank	Player	Number of Tournament	USA (United States)	HKG (Hong Kong)	SAU (Saudi Arabia)	USA (United States)	USA (United States)	EGY (Egypt)	ENG (England)	Total Points
1	(Egypt) **Nour El Sherbini**	7	25	**100**	**100**	**100**	25	65	**100**	**515**
2	(Egypt) **Raneem El Weleily**	7	65	65	65	25	40	**100**	65	**425**
3	(Egypt) **Nour El Tayeb**	7	**100**	15	40	65	**100**	40	25	**385**
4	(England) **Laura Massaro**	6	40	40	–	40	15	40	40	**215**
5	(New Zealand) **Joelle King**	7	40	25	25	15	65	15	15	**200**
5	(France) **Camille Serme**	7	15	40	15	40	25	25	40	**200**
7	(Egypt) **Nouran Gohar**	7	25	25	40	25	15	15	15	**160**
8	(England) **Sarah-Jane Perry**	7	10	15	25	25	40	15	25	**155**
9	(England) Alison Waters	7	25	15	15	15	25	25	25	**145**
10	(Hong Kong) Annie Au	7	25	15	15	10	15	25	15	**120**
10	(Wales) Tesni Evans	7	15	25	15	15	15	10	25	**120**
12	(Malaysia) Nicol David	6	15	25	25	25	10	15	–	**115**
13	(India) Joshna Chinappa	7	15	15	15	10	10	25	10	**100**
14	(United States) Olivia Blatchford	7	15	15	15	15	15	10	10	**95**
14	(England) Victoria Lust	7	15	10	15	15	10	15	15	**95**
16	(Egypt) Hania El Hammamy	7	10	10	15	10	15	15	10	**85**

Bold – Players qualified for the final

Final tournament	Country	Location	Prize money	Date	2017–18 World Series Champion
PSA World Series Finals 2018	United Arab Emirates	Dubai	$160,000	5–9 June 2018	(Egypt) Nour El Sherbini

== See also ==
- 2017 PSA World Tour
- 2018 PSA World Tour
- Official Men's Squash World Ranking
- Official Women's Squash World Ranking
