= 2013 PSA World Series =

PSA World Series 2013

Details
- Event name: PSA World Series 2013
- Website psaworldtour.com/page/SuperSeriesRanking
- Year: World Tour 2013

The PSA World Series 2013 is a series of men's squash tournaments which are part of the Professional Squash Association (PSA) World Tour for the 2013 squash season. The PSA World Series tournaments are some of the most prestigious events on the men's tour. The best-performing players in the World Series events qualify for the annual 2013 PSA World Series Finals tournament. Ramy Ashour won his first PSA World Series Squash Finals trophy, beating Mohamed El Shorbagy in the final.

== PSA World Series Ranking Points ==
PSA World Series events also have a separate World Series ranking. Points for this are calculated on a cumulative basis after each World Series event. The top eight players at the end of the calendar year are then eligible to play in the PSA World Series Finals.

Tournament			Ranking Points
Rank	Prize Money US$	Ranking Points	Winner	Runner up	3/4	5/8	9/16	17/32
World Series	$115,000-$325,000	625 points	100	65	40	25	15	10

== 2013 Tournaments ==
Tournament	Country	Location	Rank	Prize money	Date	2013 Winner
Tournament of Champions 2013	United States	New York City	World Series Gold	$115,000	18–24 January 2013	(Egypt) Ramy Ashour
North American Open 2013	United States	Richmond, Virginia	World Series Gold	$115,000	25 February – 2 March 2013	(Egypt) Ramy Ashour
Kuwait PSA Cup 2013	Kuwait	Kuwait City	World Series Platinum	$190,000	8–14 March 2013	(Egypt) Ramy Ashour
British Open 2013	England	Hull	World Series Platinum	$150,000	20–26 May 2013	(Egypt) Ramy Ashour
US Open 2013	United States	Philadelphia	World Series Gold	$115,000	11–18 October 2013	(France) Grégory Gaultier
World Championship 2013	England	Manchester	World Series Platinum	$325,000	27 October - 3 November 2013	(England) Nick Matthew
Qatar Classic 2013	Qatar	Doha	World Series Platinum	$150,000	10–15 November 2013	(Egypt) Mohamed El Shorbagy
Hong Kong Open 2013	Hong Kong	Hong Kong	World Series Platinum	$150,000	3–8 December 2013	(England) Nick Matthew

== World Series Standings 2013 ==
Performance Table Legend
10	1st Round	15	2nd Round
25	Quarterfinalist	40	Semifinalist
65	Runner-up	**100**	Winner

**Top 16 World Series Standings 2013**
Rank	Player	Number of Tournament	Tournament of Champions	North American Open	Kuwait PSA Cup	British Open	US Open	World Championship	Qatar Classic	Hong Kong Open	Total Points
Rank	Player	Number of Tournament	USA (United States)	USA (United States)	KUW (Kuwait)	ENG (England)	USA (United States)	ENG (England)	QAT (Qatar)	HKG (Hong Kong)	Total Points
1	(England) **Nick Matthew**	8	40	65	15	40	65	**100**	65	**100**	**490**
2	(Egypt) **Ramy Ashour**	6	**100**	**100**	**100**	**100**	-	40	-	25	**465**
3	(France) **Grégory Gaultier**	8	65	40	40	65	**100**	65	25	40	**440**
4	(England) **James Willstrop**	8	40	40	65	40	40	25	15	40	**305**
5	(Egypt) **Mohamed El Shorbagy**	7	25	-	40	15	25	40	**100**	25	**270**
6	(Egypt) Karim Darwish	7	25	25	25	25	40	15	40	-	**195**
7	(Spain) **Borja Golán**	6	-	-	15	25	15	15	40	65	**175**
8	(Egypt) **Tarek Momen**	8	15	15	15	25	15	15	15	25	**140**
9	(Egypt) Amr Shabana	6	15	25	25	-	-	25	25	25	**140**
10	(Germany) **Simon Rösner**	8	15	25	15	15	25	15	10	15	**135**
11	(England) Peter Barker	6	10	25	25	15	25	10	-	-	**110**
12	(India) Saurav Ghosal	7	15	10	10	15	-	25	10	15	**100**
13	(Australia) Cameron Pilley	7	10	15	10	25	-	15	15	10	**100**
14	(Egypt) Karim Abdel Gawad	7	-	15	10	15	15	5	25	15	**100**
15	(England) Daryl Selby	5	-	-	25	15	-	25	25	10	**100**
16	(Egypt) Omar Mosaad	6	25	15	15	10	-	15	15	-	**95**

Bold – The first eight players present for the final

Final tournament	Country	Location	Prize money	Date	2013 World Series Champion
PSA World Series Finals 2013	United States	Richmond, Virginia	$110,000	15-19 March 2014	(Egypt) **Ramy Ashour**

== See also ==
- PSA World Tour 2013
- WSA World Series 2013
- Official Men's Squash World Ranking
