= Premier Squash League =

Details
- Event name: Premier Squash League
- Location: England

The Premier Squash League (PSL) is an English professional squash league organised by the England Squash & Racketball, in association with Kit Kirby, which runs from October to April. Teams consist of four players: four men and one woman.

== See also ==
- Squash in England
