= 2013 Men's World Open Squash Championship =

Squash competition in Manchester, England

AJ Bell Men's World Championship 2013
- 35th PSA World Squash Championship
- Location: Manchester, England
- Venue: Manchester National Squash Centre; Manchester Central
- Date: 26 October – 3 November 2013
- Website mensworldsquashchampionship2013.com

PSA World Tour
- Category: PSA World Championship
- Prize money: $325,000

Results
- Champion: (England) Nick Matthew
- Runner-up: (France) Grégory Gaultier
- Semi-finalists: (Egypt) Ramy Ashour (Egypt) Mohamed El Shorbagy

The AJ Bell 2013 Men's World Open Squash Championship is the men's edition of the 2013 World Championship, which serves as the individual world championship for squash players. The event took place in Manchester in England from 26 October to 3 November 2013. Nick Matthew won his third World Championship title, defeating Grégory Gaultier in the final.

== Prize money and ranking points ==
For 2013, the prize purse was $325,000. The prize money and points breakdown is as follows:

Prize Money World Championship (2013)
| Event | W | F | SF | QF | 3R | 2R | 1R |
| Points (PSA) | 2890 | 1900 | 1155 | 700 | 410 | 205 | 125 |
| Prize money | $48,000 | $30,000 | $18,000 | $10,500 | $6,000 | $3,000 | $1,500 |

== Seeds ==
1. (Egypt) Ramy Ashour (semi-finals)
2. (France) Grégory Gaultier (final)
3. (England) James Willstrop (quarter-finals)
4. (England) Nick Matthew (champion)
5. (Egypt) Karim Darwish (third round)
6. (Egypt) Mohamed El Shorbagy (semi-finals)
7. (England) Peter Barker (second round)
8. (Egypt) Amr Shabana (quarter-finals)
9. (Spain) Borja Golán (third round)
10. (Egypt) Tarek Momen (third round)
11. (Egypt) Omar Mosaad (third round)
12. (Germany) Simon Rösner (third round)
13. (England) Daryl Selby (quarter-finals)
14. (Australia) Cameron Pilley (third round)
15. (Botswana) Alister Walker (second round)
16. (Colombia) Miguel Ángel Rodríguez (third round)

== Draw and results ==
=== Finals ===
Quarter finals
1 | (Egypt) Ramy Ashour * | 11 | 11 | 11
(India) Saurav Ghosal | 9 | 5 | 9
8 | (Egypt) Amr Shabana | 8 | 4 | 7
4 | (England) Nick Matthew * | 11 | 11 | 11
3 | (England) James Willstrop | 10 | 6 | 11 | 9
6 | (Egypt) Mohd El Shorbagy * | 12 | 11 | 2 | 11
13 | (England) Daryl Selby | 7 | 4 | 10
2 | (France) Grégory Gaultier * | 11 | 11 | 12

Semi-finals
1 | (Egypt) Ramy Ashour | 11 | 2 | 0 | rtd
4 | (England) Nick Matthew * | 6 | 11 | 2
6 | (Egypt) Mohamed El Shorbagy | 11 | 3 | 8 | 10
2 | (France) Grégory Gaultier * | 6 | 11 | 11 | 12

Final
4 | (England) Nick Matthew * | 11 | 11 | 11 | 7 | 11
2 | (France) Grégory Gaultier | 9 | 9 | 13 | 11 | 2

=== Top half ===
==== Section 1 ====
First round 1*
1 | (Egypt) Ramy Ashour | 10 | 13 | 11 | 11
(Netherlands) Laurens Jan Anjema | 12 | 11 | 3 | 4
Q | (Egypt) Fares Dessouky | 9 | 4 | 11 | 11 | 11
(Scotland) Alan Clyne | 11 | 11 | 8 | 7 | 9
(Malaysia) Mohd Nafi. Adnan | 11 | 12 | 4 | 8 | 13
(Egypt) Mazen Hesham | 8 | 10 | 11 | 11 | 11
(New Zealand) Campbell Grayson | 10 | 8 | 9
14 | (Australia) Cameron Pilley | 12 | 11 | 11
15 | (Botswana) Alister Walker | 11 | 11 | 13
Q | (South Africa) Shaun Le Roux | 8 | 5 | 11
(England) Joe Lee | 5 | 10 | 3
(India) Saurav Ghosal | 11 | 12 | 11
(Finland) Henrik Mustonen | 6 | 11 | 7 | 12 | 11
Q | (England) Jaymie Haycocks | 11 | 6 | 11 | 10 | 8
(Australia) Ryan Cuskelly | 4 | 11 | 4 | 5
7 | (England) Peter Barker | 11 | 8 | 11 | 11

Second round 1*
1 | (Egypt) Ramy Ashour | 11 | 11 | 11
Q | (Egypt) Fares Dessouky | 6 | 6 | 4
(Malaysia) Mohd Nafi. Adnan | 9 | 3 | 11 | 6
14 | (Australia) Cameron Pilley | 11 | 11 | 9 | 11
15 | (Botswana) Alister Walker | 7 | 5 | 11 | 7
(India) Saurav Ghosal | 11 | 11 | 7 | 11
(Finland) Henrik Mustonen | 4 | 2 | 11
7 | (England) Peter Barker | 11 | 11 | 6 | rtd

Third round 1*
1 | (Egypt) Ramy Ashour | 9 | 11 | 11 | 12
14 | (Australia) Cameron Pilley | 11 | 8 | 4 | 10
(India) Saurav Ghosal | 5 | 8 | 11 | 11 | 11
(Finland) Henrik Mustonen | 11 | 11 | 8 | 4 | 2

Quarter finals
1 | (Egypt) Ramy Ashour * | 11 | 11 | 11
(India) Saurav Ghosal | 9 | 5 | 9

==== Section 2 ====
First round *
8 | (Egypt) Amr Shabana | 11 | 11 | 11
(England) Adrian Grant | 6 | 7 | 7
(Egypt) Omar Abdel Meguid | 3 | 12 | 4 | 11 | 4
(France) Mathieu Castagnet | 11 | 10 | 11 | 7 | 11
(Hong Kong) Leo Au | 11 | 11 | 7 | 11
Q | (Canada) Shahier Razik | 4 | 8 | 11 | 9
(France) Grégoire Marche | 6 | 7 | 11 | 9
16 | (Colombia) Miguel Á. Rodríguez | 11 | 11 | 4 | 11
11 | (Egypt) Omar Mosaad | 11 | 11 | 11
(United States) Christopher Gordon | 6 | 5 | 8
(Malaysia) Ong Beng Hee | 11 | 11 | 2 | 10 | 11
(Egypt) Karim Abdel Gawad | 9 | 9 | 11 | 12 | 8
(England) Jonathan Kemp | 7 | 11 | 10
(Hong Kong) Max Lee | 11 | 13 | 12
Q | (Egypt) Zahed Mohamed | 5 | 4 | 5
4 | (England) Nick Matthew | 11 | 11 | 11

Second round **
8 | (Egypt) Amr Shabana | 11 | 11 | 12 | 11
(France) Mathieu Castagnet | 8 | 7 | 14 | 6
(Hong Kong) Leo Au | 8 | 5 | 8
16 | (Colombia) Miguel Á. Rodríguez | 11 | 11 | 11
11 | (Egypt) Omar Mosaad | 11 | 11 | 13
(Malaysia) Ong Beng Hee | 5 | 4 | 11
(Hong Kong) Max Lee | 7 | 6 | 6
4 | (England) Nick Matthew | 11 | 11 | 11

Third round
8 | (Egypt) Amr Shabana | 11 | 11 | 11
16 | (Colombia) Miguel Á. Rodríguez | 6 | 5 | 9
11 | (Egypt) Omar Mosaad | 4 | 7 | 13 | 4
4 | (England) Nick Matthew | 11 | 11 | 11 | 11

Quarter finals
8 | (Egypt) Amr Shabana | 8 | 4 | 7
4 | (England) Nick Matthew * | 11 | 11 | 11

=== Bottom half ===
==== Section 1 ====
First round 2*
3 | (England) James Willstrop | 11 | 11 | 13
Q | (England) Joel Hinds | 4 | 4 | 11
WC | (England) Ben Coleman | 7 | 7 | 9
(England) Tom Richards | 11 | 11 | 11
(Mexico) César Salazar | 11 | 4 | 7 | 11 | 11
Q | (Australia) Steven Finitsis | 8 | 11 | 11 | 9
(England) Chris Simpson | 9 | 11 | 11 | 8 | 5
9 | (Spain) Borja Golán | 11 | 6 | 9 | 11 | 11
12 | (Germany) Simon Rösner | 11 | 11 | 11
Q | (Germany) Raphael Kandra | 5 | 5 | 9
Q | (Egypt) Andrew Wagih | 9 | 8 | 10
(Kuwait) Abdullah Al Muzayen | 11 | 11 | 12
(United States) Julian Illingworth | 8 | 7 | 7
(Egypt) Omar Abdel Aziz | 11 | 11 | 11
(England) Adrian Waller | 6 | 11 | 11 | 7 | 7
6 | (Egypt) Mohd El Shorbagy | 11 | 6 | 6 | 11 | 11

Second round 2*
3 | (England) James Willstrop | 11 | 11 | 11
(England) Tom Richards | 8 | 3 | 6
(Mexico) César Salazar | 4 | 6 | 3
9 | (Spain) Borja Golán | 11 | 11 | 11
12 | (Germany) Simon Rösner | 15 | 11 | 11
(Kuwait) Abdullah Al Muzayen | 13 | 7 | 5
(Egypt) Omar Abdel Aziz | 4 | 5 | 6
6 | (Egypt) Mohd El Shorbagy | 11 | 11 | 11

Third round 2*
3 | (England) James Willstrop | 11 | 11 | 11
9 | (Spain) Borja Golán | 4 | 8 | 6
12 | (Germany) Simon Rösner | 1 | 9 | 7
6 | (Egypt) Mohd El Shorbagy | 11 | 11 | 11

Quarter finals
3 | (England) James Willstrop | 10 | 6 | 11 | 9
6 | (Egypt) Mo. El Shorbagy * | 12 | 11 | 2 | 11

==== Section 2 ====
First round
5 | (Egypt) Karim Darwish | 11 | 11 | 11
Q | (Pakistan) Nasir Iqbal | 9 | 6 | 4
Q | (Egypt) Mohd Abouelghar | 5 | 11 | 11 | 8 | 12
(Finland) Olli Tuominen | 11 | 4 | 8 | 11 | 14
(South Africa) Stephen Coppinger | 11 | 11 | 11
Q | (Kuwait) Ammar Al-Tamimi | 5 | 5 | 4
Q | (England) Charles Sharpes | 7 | 5 | 4
13 | (England) Daryl Selby | 11 | 11 | 11
10 | (Egypt) Tarek Momen | 11 | 11 | 11
Q | (England) Eddie Charlton | 9 | 6 | 7
(Egypt) Marwan El Shorbagy | 11 | 10 | 5 | 10
(Switzerland) Nicolas Müller | 7 | 12 | 11 | 12
(Egypt) Mohd Ali Anwar Reda | 2 | 5 | 5
Q | (Australia) Matthew Karwalski | 11 | 11 | 11
Q | (Denmark) Kristian Frost Olesen | 8 | 7 | 6
2 | (France) Grégory Gaultier | 11 | 11 | 11

Second round
5 | (Egypt) Karim Darwish | 11 | 11 | 11
(Finland) Olli Tuominen | 7 | 5 | 3
(South Africa) Stephen Coppinger | 9 | 10 | 11 | 3
13 | (England) Daryl Selby | 11 | 12 | 9 | 11
10 | (Egypt) Tarek Momen | 5 | 11 | 11 | 11
(Switzerland) Nicolas Müller | 11 | 5 | 4 | 3
Q | (Australia) Matthew Karwalski | 9 | 3 | 5
2 | (France) Grégory Gaultier | 11 | 11 | 11

Third round
5 | (Egypt) Karim Darwish | 11 | 9 | 10 | 11 | 8
13 | (England) Daryl Selby | 4 | 11 | 12 | 8 | 11
10 | (Egypt) Tarek Momen | 5 | 6 | 6
2 | (France) Grégory Gaultier | 11 | 11 | 11

Quarter finals
13 | (England) Daryl Selby | 7 | 4 | 10
2 | (France) Grégory Gaultier * | 11 | 11 | 12

== See also ==
- World Championship
- 2013 Women's World Open Squash Championship
- 2013 Men's World Team Squash Championships

| Preceded by Qatar (Doha); 2012 | PSA World Championship; England (Manchester); 2013 | Succeeded by Qatar (Doha); 2014 |
| Preceded by US Open; United States (Philadelphia); 2013 | PSA World Series 2013; World Championship; England (Manchester); 2013 | Succeeded by Qatar Classic; Qatar (Doha) 2013 |
