= 2018 Women's PSA World Series Finals =

PSA World Series Finals
- 5th Women's PSA World Series Finals
- Location: Dubai, United Arab Emirates
- Venue: Emirates Golf Club
- Date: 5–9 June 2018
- Website worldseriesfinals.com
- Prize money: $160,000

Results
- Champion: Nour El Sherbini (EGY)
- Runner-up: Raneem El Weleily (EGY)
- Semi-finalists: Camille Serme (FRA); Nour El Tayeb (EGY)

The 2018 Women's PSA World Series Finals is the women's edition of the PSA World Series Finals (Prize money : $160 000). The top 8 players in the 2017–18 PSA World Series are qualified for the event. The event will take place in Dubai in the United Arab Emirates from 5 to 9 June 2018.

Nour El Sherbini won its first PSA World Series Finals title after defeating fellow countrywoman Raneem El Weleily 3–1 in the Final.

== Seeds ==
1. (Egypt) Nour El Sherbini
2. (Egypt) Raneem El Weleily
3. (Egypt) Nour El Tayeb
4. (England) Laura Massaro
5. (New Zealand) Joelle King
6. (France) Camille Serme
7. (Egypt) Nouran Gohar
8. (England) Sarah-Jane Perry

== Group stage results ==
Times are Gulf Standard Time

=== Group A ===
Date	Time	Player 1	Player 2	Score
5 June	20:00	Nour El Sherbini (EGY)	Joelle King (NZL)	12–10, 11–7
5 June	21:30	Nour El Tayeb (EGY)	Nouran Gohar (EGY)	11–5, 11–4
6 June	20:00	Nour El Sherbini (EGY)	Nour El Tayeb (EGY)	11–7, 11–5
6 June	21:30	Joelle King (NZL)	Nouran Gohar (EGY)	11–8, 14–12
7 June	20:00	Nour El Sherbini (EGY)	Nouran Gohar (EGY)	11–5, 11–5
7 June	21:30	Nour El Tayeb (EGY)	Joelle King (NZL)	7–11, 11–7, 13–11

=== Standings ===
Player	Pld	W	L	Games
Nour El Sherbini (EGY)	3	3	0	6
Nour El Tayeb (EGY)	3	2	1	4
Joelle King (NZL)	3	1	2	3
Nouran Gohar (EGY)	3	0	3	0

=== Group B ===
Date	Time	Player 1	Player 2	Score
5 June	15:00	Sarah-Jane Perry (ENG)	Camille Serme (FRA)	11–8, 10–12, 10–12
5 June	16:30	Raneem El Weleily (EGY)	Laura Massaro (ENG)	11–8, 9–11, 8–11
6 June	15:00	Sarah-Jane Perry (ENG)	Laura Massaro (ENG)	13–15, 11–7, 8–11
6 June	16:30	Raneem El Weleily (EGY)	Camille Serme (FRA)	8–11, 11–7, 11–5
7 June	15:00	Laura Massaro (ENG)	Camille Serme (FRA)	7–11, 5–11
7 June	16:30	Sarah-Jane Perry (ENG)	Raneem El Weleily (EGY)	6–11, 9–11

=== Standings ===
Player	Pld	W	L	Games
Raneem El Weleily (EGY)	3	2	1	5
Camille Serme (FRA)	3	2	1	5
Laura Massaro (ENG)	3	2	1	4
Sarah-Jane Perry (ENG)	3	0	3	2

== Semifinals & Final ==
Semi finals (8 June)
1	Nour El Sherbini (EGY)	11	9	11
6	Camille Serme (FRA)	7	11	8
3	Nour El Tayeb (EGY)	7	9
2	Raneem El Weleily (EGY)	11	11

Final (9 June)
1	Nour El Sherbini (EGY)	11	9	11	11
2	Raneem El Weleily (EGY)	5	11	8	5

2018 Women's PSA World Series Finals winner
(Egypt)
Nour El Sherbini
First title

== See also ==
- 2018 Men's PSA World Series Finals
- 2017–18 PSA World Series
- PSA World Series Finals
- 2017 PSA World Tour
- 2018 PSA World Tour
