= England Squash =

Sports governing body in England

- Sport: Squash and squash 57
- Founded: 1928 (as SRA)
- Regional affiliation: European Squash Federation
- Location: National Squash Centre, Manchester
- President: Paul Millman
- Chairman: Professor Joy Carter
- CEO: Mark Williams
- Coach: David Campion

Official website
- www.englandsquash.com
- (England)

England Squash is recognised by Sport England as the English national governing body of the racket sports of squash and squash 57. Based at the National Squash Centre in Manchester, it aims to increase participation in both sports.

== History ==
The Squash Rackets Association was founded in 1928, to take over the administration of the game from the Tennis and Rackets Association. In 1934, the separate Women’s Squash Rackets Association was formed. These associations looked after squash in Great Britain until 1980, when responsibility for Scotland and Wales passed to autonomous national associations. The English SRA and Women's SRA amalgamated in 1989.

The SRA was the recognised world authority for squash until the formation, in 1967, of the International Squash Rackets Federation (which became the World Squash Federation in 1992). In 1988, the British Racketball Association merged with the SRA.

In 2001, the SRA was re-launched as England Squash, becoming England Squash & Racketball in 2009. Long-term chief executive, Nick Rider, left in 2014 and in 2015, the racketball name was dropped from its title.

In 2024, Stuart Crawford was appointed the national coach, having previously worked for Scottish Squash between 2010 and 2016.

== See also ==
- Squash in England
- Premier Squash League
- England men's national squash team
- England women's national squash team
- British National Squash Championships
- British Open Squash Championships
- British Junior Open Squash
