= Squash in England =

- Country: England
- Governing body: England Squash
- National team(s): England men's national squash team England women's national squash team

Squash is a popular sport in England. There is a long history of the sport in the country with many highly ranked English players, both in men's and women's squash.

== History of squash in England ==
England is where squash was invented. Students at Harrow School in London created it in 1830 when they discovered the potential that a small, punctured rubber ball had for yielding a game where a variety of shots were possible. Originally played in alleys and courtyards, the first purpose-built squash court was erected in Oxford in 1883.

== Professional competitions ==
Many professional squash competitions take place in England each year.

=== PSA World Tour ===
The PSA World Tour calendar includes many professional tournaments held in England every year. The most prestigious of these are the British Open Squash Championships (PSA150) and the Canary Wharf Squash Classic (PSA70).

=== Premier Squash League ===
The Premier Squash League runs every year from October to April. Teams consist of four men and one woman. There are two geographical divions (North and South, formerly known as A and B) and towards the end of the season the top two clubs from each division progress to the semi-finals.

== Top players ==
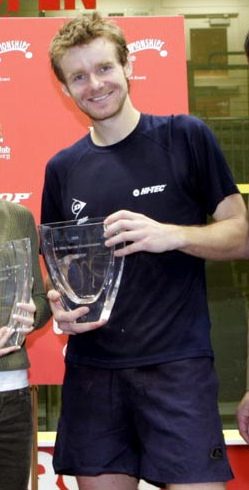
Former world number one Lee Beachill

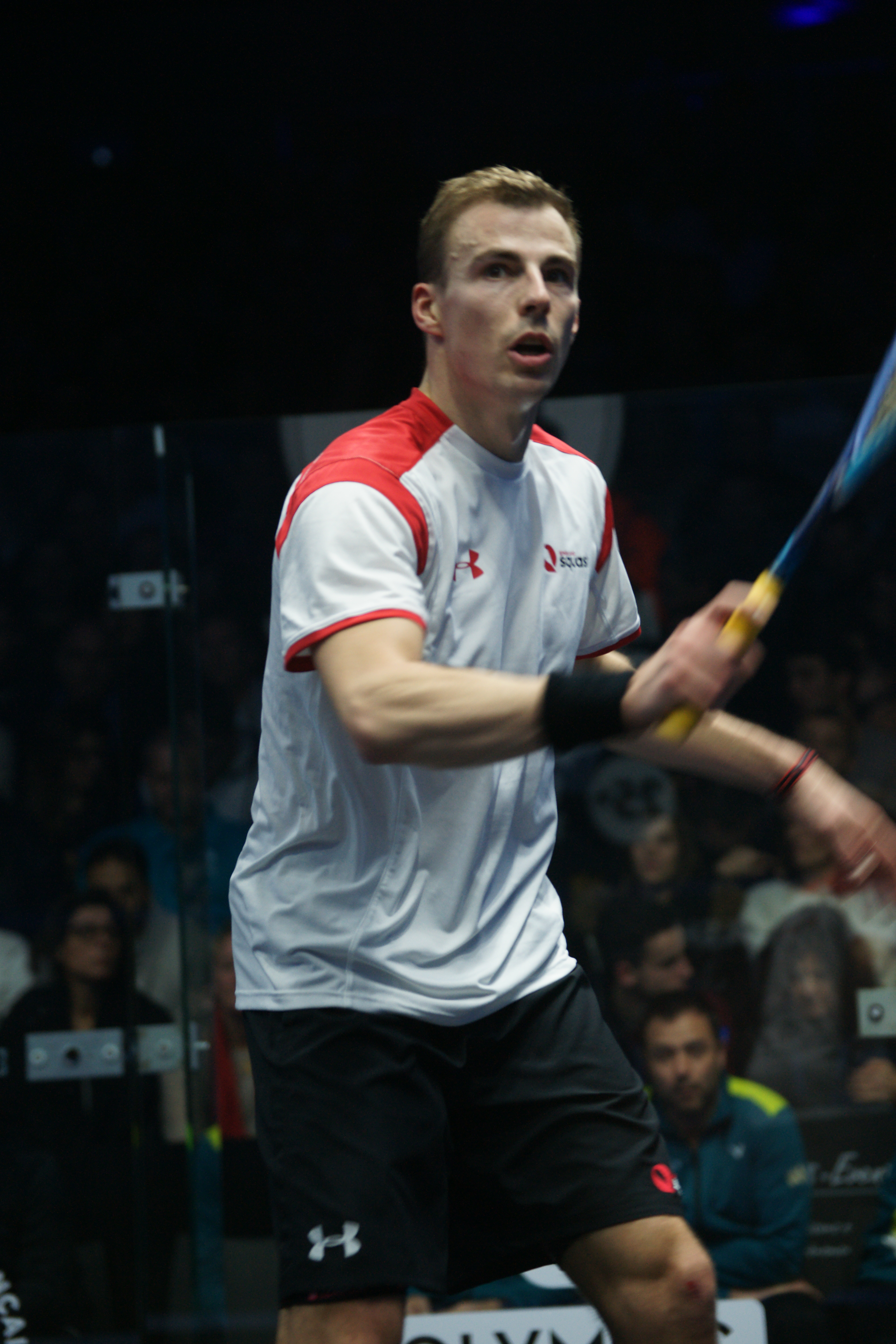
Former world number one Nick Matthew

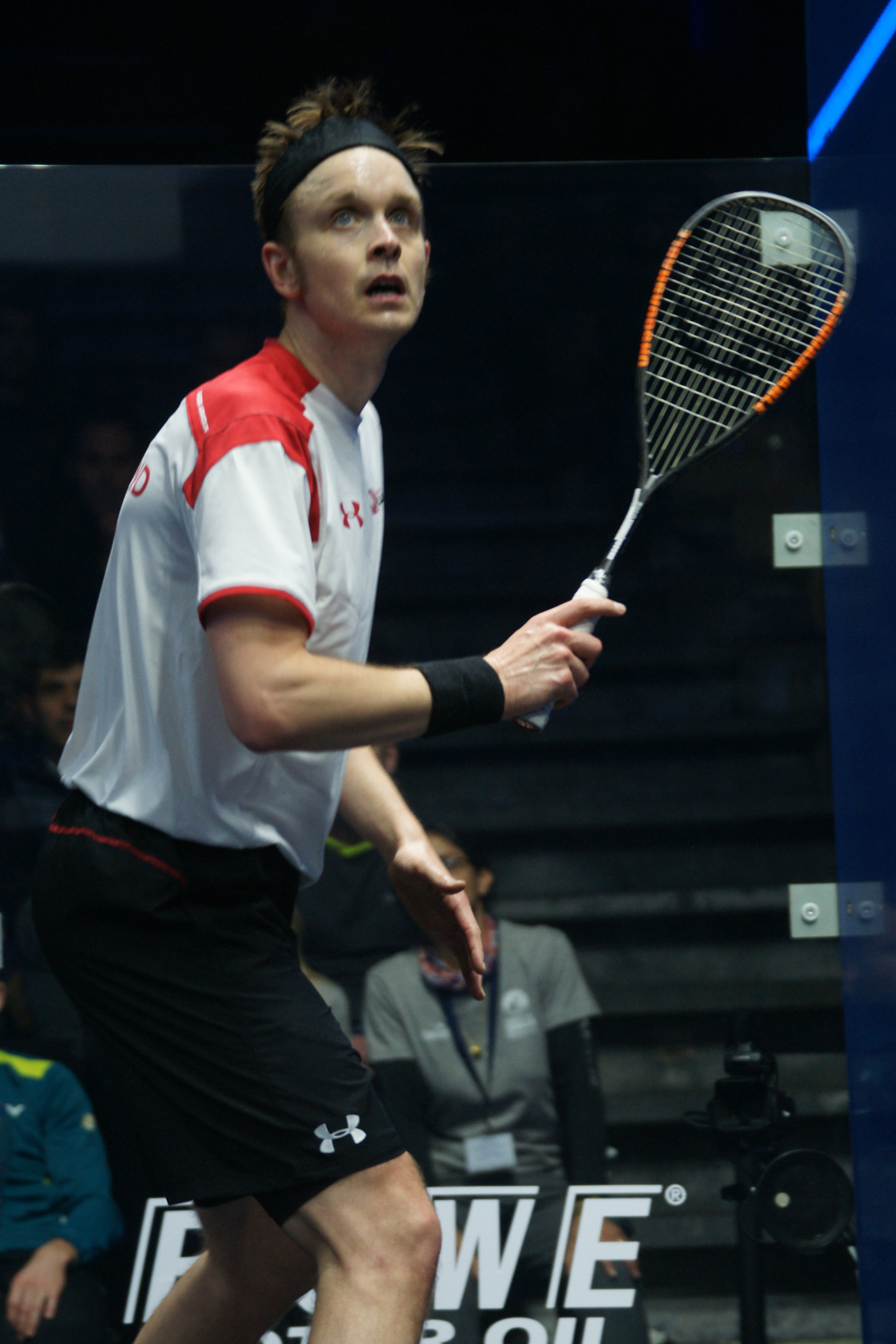
Former world number one James Willstrop

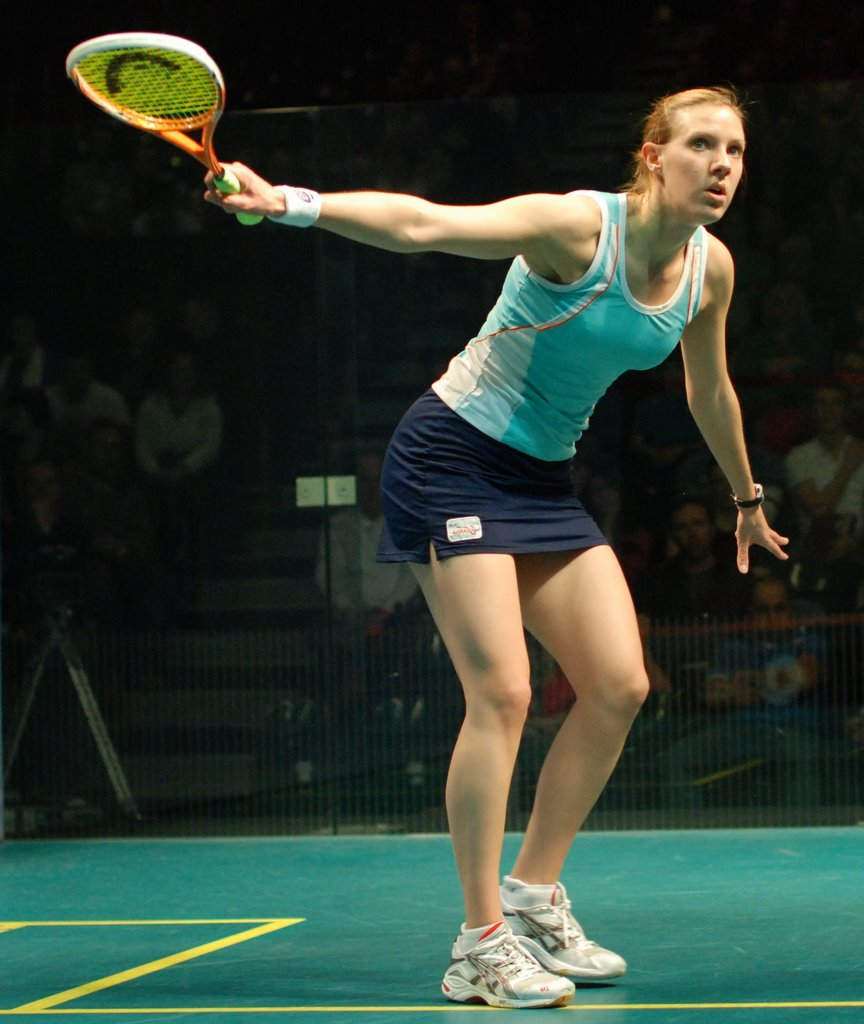
Former world number one Laura Massaro

English squash players have been known to dominate the world rankings.

=== World number ones ===
England has produced several world number ones:

- Men:
  - Lee Beachill
  - Nick Matthew
  - James Willstrop
- Women:
  - Lisa Opie
  - Cassie Jackman
  - Laura Massaro

=== Highest ranked players ===
In April 2018, the highest ranked English squash players were:

- Men:
  - Nick Matthew (12)
  - James Willstrop (14)
  - Daryl Selby (19)
  - Declan James (25)
  - Tom Richards (33)
- Women:
  - Laura Massaro (7)
  - Sarah-Jane Perry (8)
  - Alison Waters (10)
  - Victoria Lust (15)
  - Emily Whitlock (19)

== National teams ==
England has national men's and women's teams that represent the country in international competitions.

== Commonwealth Games ==
England players compete in the squash events of the Commonwealth Games, which are held every four years. At the 2018 games, English players James Willstrop and Sarah-Jane Perry won gold in the men's singles event and silver in the women's singles event respectively.

== Governance ==
Squash in England is governed by England Squash.

== Amateur level ==
At amateur level, each county in England has its own league with several divisions, where clubs affiliated to the county enter one or more teams. In 2010, Sport England statistics showed that 500,000 people regularly played squash in England, with 900 affiliated clubs and 4,500 squash courts across the country. The National Schools Championships was established in 1972 and has about 100 schools participating.

== See also ==
- Sport in England
