= Squash at the 2013 World Games – men's singles =

2013 World Games - Squash Single Men
| Host | (Colombia) Cali |
| Dates | August 2–4, 2013 |
| Teams | 21 |
Podium
| Champion | (France) Grégory Gaultier |
| Runners-up | (Germany) Simon Rösner |
| Third place | (Colombia) Miguel Á. Rodríguez |
| Fourth place | (United Kingdom) Peter Barker |

The Squash - Single Men competition at the World Games 2013 took place from 2 August to 4 August 2013 in Cali in Colombia, at the Canas Gordas Comfenalco Club.

== Seeds ==
1. (France) Grégory Gaultier (champion)
2. (United Kingdom) Peter Barker (semifinals)
3. (Germany) Simon Rösner (final)
4. (Australia) Cameron Pilley (quarterfinals)
5. (United Kingdom) Tom Richards (round of 16)
6. (Colombia) Miguel Ángel Rodríguez (semifinals)
7. (Malaysia) Ong Beng Hee (quarterfinals)
8. (Australia) Ryan Cuskelly (quarterfinals)

== Draw ==
First Round
(Hungary) Andras Torok | 0
9/16 | (India) Mahesh Mangaonkar | 3
9/16 | (India) Harinder Pal Sandhu | 0
(Jamaica) Christopher Binnie | 3
(Colombia) Anderson Cardona | 0
9/16 | (Kuwait) Yousif Nizar Saleh | 3
(Peru) Diego Elías | 1
9/16 | (Germany) Raphael Kandra | 3
9/16 | (United States) Chris Gordon | 3
(Japan) Ryosei Kobayashi | 2

Round of 16
1 | (France) Grégory Gaultier | 3
9/16 | (Canada) Shawn Delierre | 0
9/16 | (United States) Julian Illingworth | 2
8 | (Australia) Ryan Cuskelly | 3
6 | (Colombia) Miguel Ángel Rodríguez | 3
9/16 | (India) Mahesh Mangaonkar | 0
(Jamaica) Christopher Binnie | 0
4 | (Australia) Cameron Pilley | 3
3 | (Germany) Simon Rösner | 3
9/16 | (Kuwait) Yousif Nizar Saleh | 0
9/16 | (France) Mathieu Castagnet | 3
5 | (United Kingdom) Tom Richards | 1
7 | (Malaysia) Ong Beng Hee | 3
9/16 | (Germany) Raphael Kandra | 2
9/16 | (United States) Chris Gordon | 0
2 | (United Kingdom) Peter Barker | 3

Quarter finals
1 | (France) Grégory Gaultier | 3
8 | (Australia) Ryan Cuskelly | 0
6 | (Colombia) Miguel Ángel Rodríguez | 3
4 | (Australia) Cameron Pilley | 1
3 | (Germany) Simon Rösner | 3
9/16 | (France) Mathieu Castagnet | 1
7 | (Malaysia) Ong Beng Hee | 0
2 | (United Kingdom) Peter Barker | 3

Semi finals
1 | (France) Grégory Gaultier | 3
6 | (Colombia) Miguel Ángel Rodríguez | 1
3 | (Germany) Simon Rösner | 3
2 | (United Kingdom) Peter Barker | 0

Finals
1 | (France) Grégory Gaultier | 3
3 | (Germany) Simon Rösner | 1

Note: * w/d = Withdraw, * w/o = Walkover, * r = Retired

| 3rd place |
| 6 | (Colombia) Miguel Ángel Rodríguez |
| 2 | (United Kingdom) Peter Barker | w/o |
