= Borja Golán =

Spanish squash player (born 1983)

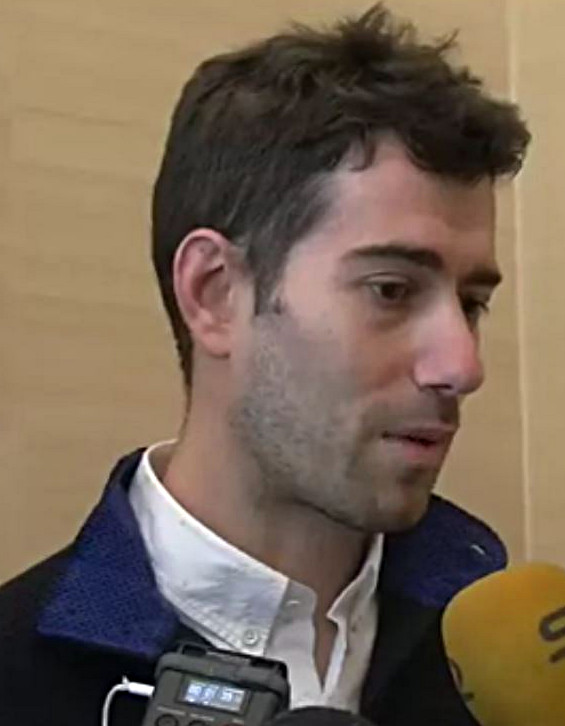

Personal information
- Born: 6 January 1983 (age 43) Santiago de Compostela
- Height: 1.83 m (6 ft 0 in)
- Weight: 77 kg (170 lb)
- Website: www.borjagolan.com

Sport
- Country: Spain
- Handedness: Right Handed
- Turned pro: 2002
- Coached by: Jesus Souto
- Retired: 2023
- Racquet used: Eye Rackets

Men's singles
- Highest ranking: No. 5 (April, 2014)
- Title: 33
- Tour final: 44
- World Open: QF (2012, 2014)
- Updated on May 2023

Borja Golán (born 6 January 1983 in Santiago de Compostela) is a Spanish retired professional squash player. He reached a career-high world ranking of World No. 5 in April 2014.

== Career overview ==
In August 2009, in the Colombian Open final, Borja suffered serious injury to his right knee which kept him out of action for six months. He reached the top ten World Ranking the month following the tournament.

About three years later, in 2013, he got back into the top 10. In November, he reached the semi-final of the Qatar Classic, winning in the quarter-final against the seed No. 1 Grégory Gaultier in a tense and controversial match. In December, he was runner-up of the Hong Kong Open, his first PSA World Series final, against Nick Matthew. He announced his retirement in May 2023.

Spanish squash legend Borja Golan is set to be in Kathmandu from 29 March to provide free coaching to the Nepali national teams and underprivileged children who are often denied the chance to take part in sport.

== Major World Series final appearances ==
=== Hong Kong Open: 1 final (0 title, 1 runner-up) ===
Outcome	Year	Opponent in the final	Score in the final
Runner-up	2013	(England) Nick Matthew	11-1, 11-8, 5-11, 11-5
