= Joe Lee (squash player) =

English squash player (born 1989)

Personal information
- Born: 6 October 1989 (age 36) London, England
- Years active: 2006-present
- Height: 1.85 m (6 ft 1 in)
- Weight: 85 kg (187 lb)

Sport
- Country: England
- Handedness: St.Georges Hill LTC
- Turned pro: 2006
- Coached by: Danny Massaro
- Retired: Active
- Racquet used: Stellar

Men's singles
- Highest ranking: No. 29 (May, 2014)
- Current ranking: No. 196 (April, 2021)
- Title: 4
- Updated on July, 2016

Joe Lee (born 6 October 1989, in London) is a professional squash player who represents England. He reached a career-high world ranking of World No. 29 in May 2014.
