= Grégory Gaultier =

French squash player

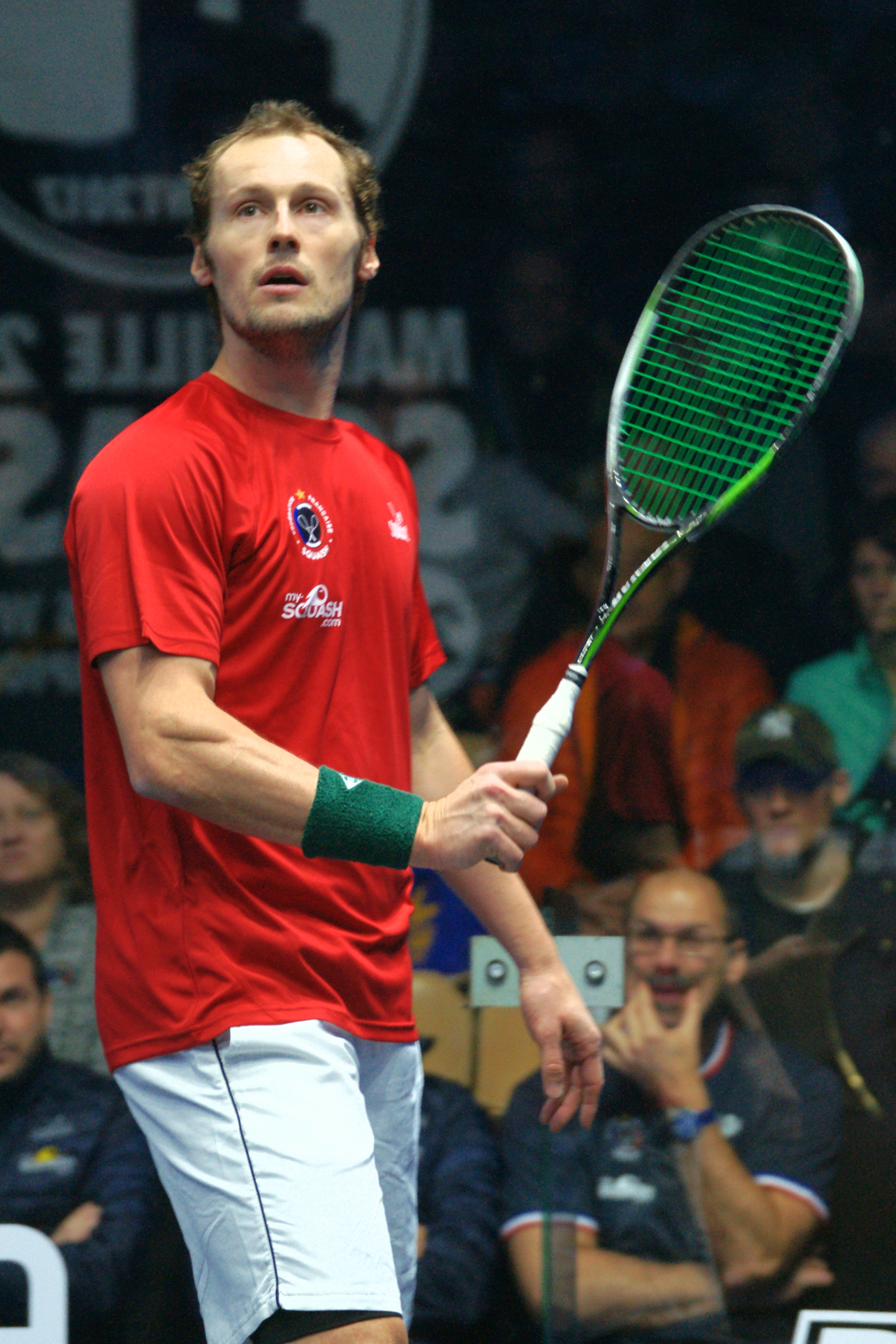
- Grégory Gaultier at the 2017 Men's World Team Squash Championships

Personal information
- Nickname: French General
- Born: 23 December 1982 (age 43) Épinal, France
- Years active: 22
- Height: 1.76 m (5 ft 9 in)
- Weight: 75 kg (165 lb)

Sport
- Country: France
- Handedness: Right handed
- Turned pro: 1999
- Coached by: Renan Lavigne; Mathieu Benoît
- Retired: 2021
- Racquet used: Dunlop Biomimetic Grégory Gaultier Elite GTS Limited Edition

Men's singles
- Highest ranking: No. 1 (November, 2009)
- Title: 44
- Tour final: 83
- World Open: W (2015)
Medal record
Men's squash
Representing France
World Games
| Gold medal – first place | 2013 Cali | Singles |
World Championships
| Silver medal – second place | 2006 Cairo | Singles |
| Silver medal – second place | 2007 Hamilton | Singles |
| Bronze medal – third place | 2009 Kuwait | Singles |
| Silver medal – second place | 2011 Rotterdam | Singles |
| Silver medal – second place | 2013 Manchester | Singles |
| Bronze medal – third place | 2014 Doha | Singles |
| Gold medal – first place | 2015 Bellevue | Singles |
| Bronze medal – third place | 2016 Cairo | Singles |
| Bronze medal – third place | 2017 Manchester | Singles |
World Team Championships
| Silver medal – second place | 2003 Vienna | Team |
| Bronze medal – third place | 2005 Islamabad | Team |
| Silver medal – second place | 2009 Odense | Team |
| Bronze medal – third place | 2007 Chennai | Team |
| Bronze medal – third place | 2013 Mulhouse | Team |
| Bronze medal – third place | 2019 Washington D.C. | Team |
- Updated on October 2021

Grégory Gaultier (born 23 December 1982) is a former professional squash player from France. He has won the 2015 World Open Squash Championship, the British Open three times, in 2007, 2014 and 2017, the Qatar Classic in 2011, the US Open twice, in 2006 and 2013, the Tournament of Champions in 2009, and the PSA World Series Finals thrice, in 2008, 2009 and 2016. He reached the final of the World Open in 2006, 2007, 2011 and 2013, and the World No. 1 ranking in 2009. Gaultier is affectionately known to his friends as The General.

== Career overview ==
Gaultier was the European junior squash champion in 2000 and 2001. He also won a British Junior Open title and finished as the runner-up at the World Junior Squash Championships.

In 2003, Gaultier was a member of the French team which finished runners-up to Australia at the World Team Squash Championships. In the semi-finals against England, Gaultier won the deciding match against Lee Beachill which took France through to the final.

At the 2006 World Open, Gaultier defeated World No. 1 and defending-champion Amr Shabana in the semi-finals, before losing in five games in the final to David Palmer 11–9, 11–9, 9–11, 10–11 (4–6), 2–11. In 2007, Gaultier again reached the World Open final, losing 7–11, 4–11, 6–11 to Shabana.

At the 2007 British Open, Gaultier defeated his fellow Frenchman Thierry Lincou in the final 11–4, 10–12, 11–6, 11–3. He became the first French winner of the British Open.

At the 2009 Tournament of Champions, Gaultier defeated the world No.1 Karim Darwish in the semifinal, and beat Nick Matthew in the final with a score 11–9, (2–11), 11–8, 11–4. He is the only Frenchman to have won the title.

Gaultier moved to the top of the world ranking in November 2009, a feat achieved after losing in the final of the Hong Kong Open a month earlier. In 2009 he became the second French player to become world no 1.

Gaultier has since won the Qatar Classic and reached the semi-finals of the J.P. Morgan Tournament of Champions, and later won the Case Swedish Open after dispatching Karim Darwish in the finals.

In 2013 he was Gold medalist of the World Games in Cali against Simon Rösner in the final. He won the US Open against Nick Matthew 11–4, 11–5, 11–5. Two weeks later, he reached the World Championship final for the fourth time, losing again 11–9, 11–9, 11–13, 7-11, 11–2 to Nick Matthew.

In February 2014 he once again reached the top of the World Ranking, but again only for a month, as was the case in November 2009. One month later, in March, he won the Metro Squash Windy City Open, another PSA World Series tournament in the University Club of Chicago beating the apparently injured Ramy Ashour in the final 11–7, 11–3, 11–4. In April he reached World Number 1 ranking for the third time.
In May he won the British Open for the second time beating Nick Matthew in a very quick final 11–3, 11–6, 11–2.

In October 2021 Gaultier announced his retirement from the PSA World Tour.

== World Open final appearances ==
=== 1 title & 4 runner-up ===
| Outcome | Year | Location | Opponent in the final | Score in the final |
|---|---|---|---|---|
| Runner-up | 2006 | Cairo, Egypt | (Australia) David Palmer | 9–11, 9–11, 11–9, 16–14, 11–2 |
| Runner-up | 2007 | Hamilton, Bermuda | (Egypt) Amr Shabana | 11–7, 11–4, 11–6 |
| Runner-up | 2011 | Rotterdam, Netherlands | (England) Nick Matthew | 6-11, 11–9, 11–6, 11-5 |
| Runner-up | 2013 | Manchester, England | (England) Nick Matthew | 11–9, 11–9, 11–13, 7-11, 11-2 |
| Winner | 2015 | Bellevue, United States | (Egypt) Omar Mosaad | 11–6, 11–7, 12-10 |

== Major World Series final appearances ==
=== British Open: 5 finals (3 titles, 2 runner-up) ===
| Outcome | Year | Opponent in the final | Score in the final |
|---|---|---|---|
| Winner | 2007 | (France) Thierry Lincou | 11–8, 5–11, 11–4, 9–11, 11–6 |
| Runner-up | 2013 | (Egypt) Ramy Ashour | 7-11, 11–4, 11–7, 11-8 |
| Winner | 2014 | (England) Nick Matthew | 11–3, 11–6, 11-2 |
| Runner-up | 2015 | (Egypt) Mohamed El Shorbagy | 11–9, 6-11, 5-11, 11–8, 11-5 |
| Winner | 2017 | (England) Nick Matthew | 8-11, 11–7, 11–3, 11-3 |

=== Tournament of Champions: 4 finals (1 title, 3 runner-up) ===
| Outcome | Year | Opponent in the final | Score in the final |
|---|---|---|---|
| Winner | 2009 | (England) Nick Matthew | 11-9,2-11,11-8,11-4 |
| Runner-up | 2013 | (Egypt) Ramy Ashour | 7-11, 6-11, 12–10, 11–3, 11-1 |
| Runner-up | 2014 | (Egypt) Amr Shabana | 11-8,11-3, 11-4 |
| Runner-up | 2017 | (Egypt) Karim Abdel Gawad | 6-11,11-6, 12–10, 11-6 |

=== Hong Kong Open: 5 finals (0 title, 5 runner-up) ===
| Outcome | Year | Opponent in the final | Score in the final |
|---|---|---|---|
| Runner-up | 2007 | (Egypt) Amr Shabana | 11–13, 11–3, 11–6, 13-11 |
| Runner-up | 2008 | (Egypt) Amr Shabana | 11–9, 13–15, 8-11, 11–2, 11-3 |
| Runner-up | 2009 | (Egypt) Amr Shabana | 11–9, 9-11, 11–3, 5-2 (rtd) |
| Runner-up | 2010 | (Egypt) Ramy Ashour | 10–12, 11–9, 11–9, 9-11, 11-9 |
| Runner-up | 2014 | (Egypt) Mohamed El Shorbagy | 11–9, 11–2, 4-11, 8-11, 11-4 |

=== Qatar Classic: 3 finals (1 title, 2 runner-up) ===
| Outcome | Year | Opponent in the final | Score in the final |
|---|---|---|---|
| Runner-up | 2007 | (Egypt) Amr Shabana | 11–4, 8-11, 11–6, 11-5 |
| Winner | 2011 | (England) James Willstrop | 11–8, 11–7, 2-11, 11-8 |
| Runner-up | 2015 | (Egypt) Mohamed El Shorbagy | 11–5, 11–7, 5-11, 12-10 |

=== US Open: 4 finals (3 titles, 1 runner-up) ===
| Outcome | Year | Opponent in the final | Score in the final |
|---|---|---|---|
| Winner | 2006 | (Egypt) Amr Shabana | 11–5, 7-11, 11–4, 11-9 |
| Runner-up | 2012 | (Egypt) Ramy Ashour | 11–4, 11–9, 11-9 |
| Winner | 2013 | (England) Nick Matthew | 11–4, 11–5, 11-5 |
| Winner | 2015 | (Egypt) Omar Mosaad | 11–6, 11–3, 11-5 |

== See also ==
- Official Men's Squash World Ranking

Sporting positions
| Preceded by Karim Darwish; Nick Matthew; Nick Matthew; Mohamed El Shorbagy | World No. 1 November 2009; February 2014; April 2014 - November 2014; December 2015 | Succeeded by Karim Darwish; Nick Matthew; Mohamed El Shorbagy; Mohamed El Shorbagy |
