= Simon Rösner =

German squash player (born 1987)

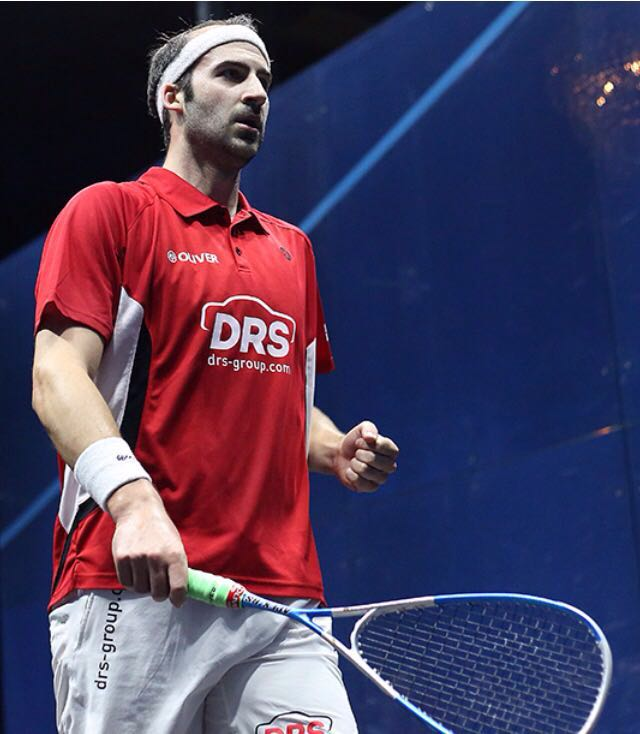
- Rösner in 2016

Personal information
- Born: 5 November 1987 (age 38) Würzburg, Germany
- Height: 1.89 m (6 ft 2 in)
- Weight: 86 kg (190 lb)

Sport
- Country: Germany
- Handedness: Right Handed
- Turned pro: 2003
- Coached by: Ronny Vlassaks, Thomas Prange (Athletic-Coach)
- Retired: 2020
- Racquet used: Oliver

Men's singles
- Highest ranking: No. 3 (December 2018)
- Current ranking: No. 7 (January 2020)
- Title: 9
- Tour final: 17
- World Open: SF (2019)
Medal record
Men's squash
Representing Germany
World Championships
Bronze medal – third place	2018–19 Chicago	Singles
Bronze medal – third place	2019–20 Doha	Singles
World Games
Gold medal – first place	2017 Wrocław	Singles
Silver medal – second place	2013 Cali	Singles
- Updated on March 2018

Simon Rösner (born 5 November 1987) is a German former professional squash player. He broke into the Top 10 PSA World Rankings for the first time in November 2014, going on to become the highest-ranked male German squash player of all time. Rösner subsequently reached a world ranking of No. 6 matching Germany's Sabine Schone's career-high world ranking of No. 6 in June 2015. Rösner broke into the world Top 5 in June 2018 and Top 3 in December 2018 making him the highest-ever-ranked German player.

== Career overview ==
In October 2012, Rösner won the Santiago Squash Open against Cameron Pilley in the final.

In 2013, in what was referred to as the battle of the giants, he beat Omar Mosaad in 5 games in the North American Open to reach the quarter-finals of a World Series tournament for the second time. In the same year, he became a silver medalist at the World Games in Cali and won the Alwatan and Asnan International, a PSA International 50 tournament, in Kuwait defeating Borja Golán in the final in 3 games.

He won a gold medal at the 2017 World Games in Wrocław, Poland.

In January 2018, he became the first German player to win a PSA World Series tournament at the Tournament of Champions, played in Grand Central Station, New York, after he followed up a stunning semi-final upset of World No.1 Grégory Gaultier to take an 11-8, 11-9, 6-11, 11-5 victory over World No.7 Tarek Momen in 71 minutes.

Rösner reached two consecutive finals and three consecutive semi-finals in the US-Open, Qatar Classics and Hong Kong Open, respectively making 2018 his best year on the World Tour. He was the world No. 5 between June 2018 and November 2018 and No. 3 in December 2018.

On 21 December 2020, Rösner announced his retirement from the PSA World Tour. He was ranked No.1 in Germany and No.8 in the world.

== Titles and finals ==
=== Major finals (3) ===
Major tournaments include:

- PSA World Championships
- PSA World Tour Finals
- Top-tier PSA World Tour tournaments (Platinum/World Series/Super Series)

Year/Season	Tournament	Opponent	Result	Score
2018	Tournament of Champions	Tarek Momen	Win (1)	11-8 11-9 6-11 11-5
2018	U.S. Open	Mohamed El Shorbagy	Loss (1)	11-8 8-11 11-6 8-11 4-11
2018	Qatar Classic	Ali Farag	Loss (2)	9-11 7-11 5-11
