= Australian Open (squash) =

Squash tournament

Details
- Event name: City Tattersalls Group Australian Open
- Location: Sydney, Australia
- Venue: Sydney University Aquatic Centre
- Website www.squash.org.au/w/events/Australian_Open

Men's Winner
- Category: PSA World Tour Bronze

The Australian Open is an annual squash tournament conducted by Squash Australia and held since 1939. The event is on the Professional Squash Association (PSA) international circuit.

== History ==
The Australian Open was originally known as the Open Championship of Australia and began in 1939 when the Broadhurst Cup competition for professionals and amateurs was introduced. However, the Australian Amateur Championship was held alongside the Australian Open. In 1979, during the period when squash became fully professional the Open Championship became the Australia Open (as it is known today) and the Australian Amateur Championship was renamed before being discontinued some years later.

== Past winners ==
=== Men ===
Year	Winner	Runner-up	score	Notes/Ref
1939	(Australia) Gordon Watson	(Australia) Merv Weston	9–7, 9–5, 9–0	
1940–1945 not held due to World War II
1946	(Australia) Gordon Watson			
1947	(Australia) Gordon Watson			
1948	(Australia) Gordon Watson			
1949	(Egypt) Mahmoud Karim	(Australia) Gordon Watson	4–9, 9–0, 4–9, 9–2, 10–8	
1950	(India) Abdul Bari			
1951	(Australia) Eric Metcalf			
1952	(Australia) Jack H. Garrett			
1953	(Australia) Brian A. Boys			
1954	(Australia) Brian A. Boys			
1955	(Australia) Brian A. Boys			
1956	(Australia) Brian A. Boys			
1957	(Pakistan) Hashim Khan			
1958–1969 not held
1970	(Republic of Ireland) Jonah Barrington	Geoff Hunt	9–2, 6–9, 6–9, 9–3, 9–3	
1971	(Australia) Geoff Hunt			
1972 not held
1973	(Australia) Geoff Hunt			
1974 not held
1975	(Pakistan) Mohibullah Khan			
1976	(Australia) Geoff Hunt			
1977	(Australia) Geoff Hunt			
1978	(Australia) Geoff Hunt			
1979	(Australia) Geoff Hunt			
1980	(Australia) Geoff Hunt			
1981	(Australia) Geoff Hunt	(Australia) Dean Williams	9–3, 9–1, 10–9	
1982	(Pakistan) Jahangir Khan			
1983	(Australia) Ross Thorne	(Australia) Chris Dittmar	10-8, 9-6, 3-9, 9-1	
1984	(Australia) Tristan Nancarrow	(Australia) Dean Williams	3–1	
1985	(Australia) Rodney Martin	(Australia) Geoff Hunt	7–9, 9–2, 2–9, 9–1, 9–3	
1986	(Australia) Rodney Martin	(Australia) Rodney Eyles	9–4, 9–0, 9–2	
1987	(Australia) Chris Robertson	(Australia) Rodney Martin	5–9, 9–6, 5–9, 9–1, 9–4	
1988	(Australia) Chris Dittmar	(Australia) Rodney Martin	9–1, 9–4, 9–3	
1989	(Australia) Chris Dittmar	(Australia) Rodney Martin	9–5, 9–3, 9–4	
1990	(Australia) Rodney Martin	(Australia) Chris Dittmar	15–11, 13–15, 15–9, 15–10	
1991	(Australia) Chris Dittmar	(Pakistan) Jahangir Khan	15-10, 14-17, 15-10, 15-8	
1992	(Australia) Rodney Martin	(Pakistan) Jansher Khan	15-12, 15-12, 15-8	
1993	(Australia) Rodney Martin	(Australia) Chris Dittmar	15-13, 14-17, 15-8, 15-7	
1994	(Australia) Brett Martin	(Australia) Billy Haddrell	15–12, 15–13, 8–15, 15–11	
1995 No competition
1996	(Australia) Brett Martin			
1997	(Australia) Rodney Eyles	(Australia) Brett Martin	15-9, 11-15, 17-15, 15-17, 17-15	
1998	(Canada) Jonathon Power	(Australia) Anthony Hill	15-10, 15-8, 15-8	
1999 No competition
2000	(Australia) Anthony Ricketts	(Australia) Paul Price	15-6, 12-15, 15-2, 11-15, 15-13	
2001	(Netherlands) Tommy Berden	(Australia) Anthony Ricketts	15-12, 17-16, 11-15, 12-15, 15-13	
2002	(Australia) Stewart Boswell	(Australia) Anthony Ricketts	13-15, 9-15, 15-9, 15-2, 15-11	
2003	(Australia) Dan Jenson	(Australia) Paul Price	12-15, 15-12, 15-11, 15-2	
2004	(Australia) Dan Jenson	(Australia) Cameron Pilley	4-15, 15-5, 15-8, 15-5	
2005	(Australia) Anthony Ricketts	(Australia) David Palmer	11-9, 11-8, 11-9	
2006	(Australia) Stewart Boswell	(Australia) David Palmer	7-11, 11-8, 4-11, 12-10, 11-2	
2007	(Australia) Stewart Boswell	(Australia) Cameron Pilley	11-4, 11-6, 6-11, 7-11, 11-6	
2008	(Australia) David Palmer	(New Zealand) Kashif Shuja	11-7, 14-12, 11-8	
2009	(Australia) Stewart Boswell	(Australia) Cameron Pilley	11-8, 7-11, 11-8, 10-12, 11-9	
2010	(England) Nick Matthew	(Egypt) Ramy Ashour	14-16, 11-7, 12-10, 11-4	
2011	(Egypt) Ramy Ashour	(England) Nick Matthew	14-12, 11-6, 10-12, 11-8, 11-4	
2012	(Egypt) Ramy Ashour	(Egypt) Omar Mosaad	11-9, 11-9, 11-6	
2013–2014 No competition
2015	(New Zealand) Paul Coll	(Australia) Cameron Pilley	11-7, 5-11, 11-6, 11-5	
2016	(Qatar) Abdulla Mohd Al Tamimi	(New Zealand) Campbell Grayson	6-11, 11-9, 11-7, 11-5	
2017	(Malaysia) Eain Yow Ng	(Australia) Joshua Larkin	13-11, 11-6, 11-9	
2018	(Australia) Rex Hedrick	(Switzerland) Dimitri Steinmann	11-4, 12-10, 11-5	
2019	(France) Victor Crouin	(Malaysia) Mohammad Syafiq Kamal	11-8, 11-5, 11-4	
2020 Cancelled due to COVID-19 pandemic in Australia
2021	(Australia) Rhys Dowling	(Australia) Joseph White	11-8, 11-6, 11-4	
2022	(Colombia) Miguel Ángel Rodríguez	(Scotland) Greg Lobban	8–11, 11–8, 11–1, 11–9	
2024	(Egypt) Youssef Soliman	(France) Victor Crouin	11–8, 11–4, 4–11, 11–6	2023-2024 season
2025	(Egypt) Karim Gawad	(New Zealand) Paul Coll	9–11, 11–6, 13–11, 11–9	
2026	(New Zealand) Paul Coll	(Wales) Joel Makin	19–17, 11–4, 14–12	

=== Women ===
Year	Winner	Runner-up	score	Notes/Ref
1979	(Australia) Vicki Hoffmann			
1980	(Australia) Vicki Hoffmann			
1981	(Australia) Rhonda Thorne	(Australia) Vicki Hoffmann	10–9, 9–1, 9–6	
1982	(Australia) Vicki Cardwell			
1983	(Australia) Vicki Cardwell	(Australia) Rhonda Thorne	9–1, 9–3, 9–4	
1984	(Australia) Vicki Cardwell			
1985	(Australia) Jan Miller	(Australia) Diane Davies	9–3, 9–5, 9–7	
1986	(England) Lisa Opie			
1987	(England) Lisa Opie	(Australia) Robyn Friday	9–6, 3–9, 4–9, 9–7, 9–7	
1988	(Australia) Vicki Cardwell	(Australia) Michelle Martin	10–8, 5–9, 9–0, 9–7	
1989	(Australia) Vicki Cardwell	(Australia) Danielle Drady	9–6, 9–2, 9–0	
1990	(New Zealand) Susan Devoy	(Australia) Michelle Martin	13–15, 17–14, 15–10, 17–15	
1991	(Australia) Michelle Martin	(Australia) Liz Irving	16-17, 15-12, 15-11, 15-12	
1992	(New Zealand) Susan Devoy	(England) Cassie Jackman	15-10, 15-9, 11-15, 15-11	
1993	(Australia) Michelle Martin	(Australia) Liz Irving	15-13, 15-8, 15-5	
1994	(Australia) Michelle Martin	(Australia) Liz Irving	15–13, 15–6, 11–15, 15–13	
1995	(Australia) Michelle Martin	(Australia) Sarah Fitz-Gerald	9-3, 9-4, 5-9, 9-5	
1996	(Australia) Michelle Martin	(Australia) Sarah Fitz-Gerald	4-9, 9-5, 9-4, 9-1	
1997	(Australia) Sarah Fitz-Gerald	(Australia) Michelle Martin	5-9, 9-4, 9-4, 9-0	
1998	(Australia) Michelle Martin	(Australia) Sarah Fitz-Gerald	9-4, 2-9, 9-6, 9-5	
1999	(Australia) Michelle Martin	(New Zealand) Leilani Rorani	9-7, 9-0, 9-3	
2000	(New Zealand) Leilani Joyce	(New Zealand) Carol Owens	9-7, 9-5, 9-3	
2001	(Australia) Sarah Fitz-Gerald	(Australia) Natalie Grinham	9-0, 9-1, 9-2	
2002	(Australia) Sarah Fitz-Gerald	(Australia) Laura Keating	9-0, 9-2, 9-0	
2003	(Australia) Sarah Fitz-Gerald	(Australia) Natalie Grinham	9-0, 9-2, 9-2	
2004	(Australia) Natalie Grinham	(Australia) Amelia Pittock	9-0, 9-0, 9-4	
2005	(Australia) Rachael Grinham	(Australia) Amelia Pittock	9-3, 9-7, 9-1	
2006	(Australia) Kasey Brown	(Australia) Dianne Desira	9-2, 9-1, 9-3	
2007	(New Zealand) Shelley Kitchen	(Australia) Kasey Brown	9-4, 9-7, 9-4	
2008	(Hong Kong) Annie Au	(Australia) Kasey Brown	6-11, 7-11, 11-6, 11-6, 12-10	
2009	(New Zealand) Joelle King	(Hong Kong) Annie Au	11-6, 11-13, 14-12, 11-7	
2010	(Republic of Ireland) Madeline Perry	(England) Alison Waters	11-5, 12-10, 6-11, 4-11, 13-11	
2011	(Malaysia) Nicol David	(England) Jenny Duncalf	11-8, 11-4, 11-6	
2012	(Malaysia) Nicol David	(England) Laura Massaro	17-15, 11-2, 11-6	
2013–2014 No competition
2015	(New Zealand) Joelle King	(Hong Kong) Annie Au	11-5, 11-6, 11-9	
2016	(India) Dipika Pallikal	(Egypt) Mayar Hany	10-12,11-5,11-6,11-4	
2017	(Australia) Rachael Grinham	(Malaysia) Sivasangari Subramaniam	11-5, 11-9, 11-7	
2018	(Malaysia) Low Wee Wern	(Egypt) Hana Ramadan	11-6, 11-9, 10-12, 11-6	
2019	(Malaysia) Sivasangari Subramaniam	(Japan) Satomi Watanabe	5-11, 11-9, 11-9, 11-9	
2020 Cancelled due to COVID-19 pandemic in Australia
2021	(Australia) Rachael Grinham	(Australia) Jessica Turnbull	15-13, 11-9, 7-11, 5-11, 11-8	
2022	(Belgium) Nele Gilis	(United States) Sabrina Sobhy	11-9, 11-8, 11-6	
2024	(Egypt) Salma Hany	(Egypt) Amina Orfi	11–5, 11–8, 11–9	2023-2024 season
2025	(United States) Olivia Weaver	(Egypt) Amina Orfi	4–11, 11–9, 11–1, 11–9	
2026	(Malaysia) Sivasangari Subramaniam	(United States) Marina Stefanoni	11–7, 11–4, 11–8	
