= 1992 Men's British Open Squash Championship =

British Open Squash Championships
- 54th British Open Championships

Details
- Location: London, England
- Venue: Lambs Squash Club & Wembley Conference Centre
- Dates: 8–13 April 1992

The 1992 Hi-Tec British Open Championships was held at the Lambs Squash Club with the later stages being held at the Wembley Conference Centre from 8–13 April 1992.
Jansher Khan won his first title defeating Chris Robertson in the final.

== Seeds ==
1. (Pakistan) Jansher Khan
2. (Australia) Chris Dittmar
3. (Australia) Rodney Martin
4. (Australia) Chris Robertson
5. (Australia) Brett Martin
6. (Finland) Sami Elopuro
7. (Australia) Tristan Nancarrow
8. (New Zealand) Ross Norman
9. (Australia) Rodney Eyles
10. (Scotland) Dale Brannan
11. (England) Del Harris
12. (England) Peter Marshall
13. (England) Simon Parke
14. (England) Chris Walker
15. (England) Bryan Beeson
16. (Wales) Adrian Davies

== Draw and results ==
=== Final Qualifying round ===
Player One	Player Two	Score
(Netherlands) Raymond Scheffer	(Australia) John Williams	9-3 8-10 0-9 0-2 9-3
(France) Julien Bonetat	(England) Paul Lord	7-9 9-3 9-5 9-7
(Sweden) Fredrik Johnson	(Germany) Oliver Rucks	9-4 9-2 9-4
(South Africa) Craig Wapnick	(Netherlands) Lucas Built	9-1 9-5 7-9 9-1
(South Africa) Craig Van der Wath	(England) Darren Webb	9-5 9-7 9-4
(Australia) Mark Carlyon	(Germany) Simon Frenz	9-6 9-6 3-9 9-4
(England) Danny Meddings	(Australia) Billy Haddrell	8-10 1-9 9-2 9-7 9-3

=== Main draw ===
First round
1	(Pakistan) Jansher Khan	9	9	9
(Netherlands) Raymond Scheffer	1	1	0
14	(England) Chris Walker	7	9	1	9	9
(England) Phil Whitlock	9	6	9	7	3
7	(Australia) Tristan Nancarrow	9	9	9
(France) Julien Bonetat	6	2	1
12	(England) Peter Marshall	9	9	9
(Australia) Anthony Hill	7	5	0
3	(Australia) Rodney Martin	9	9	9
(England) Mark Cairns	4	0	2
11	(England) Del Harris	9	9	9
(Sweden) Fredrik Johnson	2	7	1
6	(Finland) Sami Elopuro	10	9	9
(England) John Ransome	8	7	3
9	(Australia) Rodney Eyles	9	3	9	7	9
(South Africa) Craig Wapnick	3	9	2	9	5
4	(Australia) Chris Robertson	9	9	9
(South Africa) Craig van der Wath	4	4	1
(Canada) Gary Waite	6	9	9	9
15	(England) Bryan Beeson	9	2	3	3
8	(New Zealand) Ross Norman	9	9	7	5	9
(Republic of Ireland) Derek Ryan	2	2	9	9	1
(England) Jason Nicolle	9	9	9	9
16	(Wales) Adrian Davies	4	10	2	5
2	(Australia) Chris Dittmar	9	9	9
(England) Stephen Meads	3	0	0
10	(Scotland) Mark Maclean	9	9	9
(Australia) Mark Carlyon	7	1	5
5	(Australia) Brett Martin	9	9	9
(England) Tony Hands	4	2	0
13	(England) Simon Parke	9	9	7	9
(England) Danny Meddings	0	2	9	3

Second round
1	(Pakistan) Jansher K	9	9	9
14	(England) Walker	1	5	0
7	(Australia) Nancarrow	9	9	0	10
12	(England) Marshall	5	6	9	9
3	(Australia) Martin R	9	9	8	9
11	(England) Harris	6	4	10	2
6	(Finland) Elopuro	10	5	9	9
9	(Australia) Eyles	8	9	1	2
4	(Australia) Robertson	9	9	9
(Canada) Waite	5	5	1
8	(New Zealand) Norman	9	9	6	9
(England) Nicolle	4	0	9	3
2	(Australia) Dittmar	w/o
10	(Scotland) Maclean	scr
5	(Australia) Martin B	10	9	9
13	(England) Parke	9	4	6

Quarter-finals
1	(Pakistan) Jansher K	9	9	9
7	(Australia) Nancarrow	2	0	1
3	(Australia) Martin R	9	9	9
6	(Finland) Elopuro	7	7	7
4	(Australia) Robertson	8	9	10	9
8	(New Zealand) Norman	10	5	8	1
2	(Australia) Dittmar	w/o
5	(Australia) Martin B	scr

Semi-finals
1	(Pakistan) Jansher K	5	9	9	4	9
3	(Australia) Martin R	9	1	5	9	4
Final
1	(Pakistan) Jansher K	9	10	9
4	(Australia) Robertson	7	9	5
4	(Australia) Robertson	4	9	9	9
2	(Australia) Dittmar	9	7	2	3

Preceded by 1991	British Open Squash Championships; England (London); 1992	Succeeded by 1993
