= 1993 Men's World Team Squash Championships =

Men's World Team 1993
- 14th World Men's Team Championship
- Location: Pakistan
- Date: November 24–30, 1993

Results
- Champions: Pakistan
- Runners-up: Australia
- Third place: England

The 1993 Men's World Team Squash Championships were held in Pakistan and took place from November 24 until November 30, 1993.

== Results ==
=== Pool A ===
Team one	Team two	Score
Australia	Egypt	3-0
Australia	New Zealand	2-1
Australia	Pakistan	2-1
Egypt	New Zealand	2-1
Egypt	Pakistan	1-2
New Zealand	Pakistan	0-3

Pos	Nation	Team	P	W	L	Pts
1	Australia	Rodney Martin, Brett Martin, Rodney Eyles, Tristan Nancarrow	3	3	0	6
2	Pakistan	Jansher Khan, Jahangir Khan, Zarak Jahan Khan, Mir Zaman Gul	3	2	1	4
3	Egypt	Ahmed Barada, Amir Wagih, Gamal El Amir, Omar El Borolossy	3	1	2	2
4	New Zealand	Ross Norman, Glen Wilson, Wayne Werder, Paul Steel	3	0	3	0

=== Pool B ===
Team one	Team two	Score
England	Netherlands	2-1
England	Sweden	3-0
England	Finland	3-0
Finland	Sweden	3-0
Finland	Netherlands	3-0
Netherlands	Sweden	0-3

Pos	Nation	Team	P	W	L	Pts
1	England	Peter Marshall, Chris Walker, Phil Whitlock, Simon Parke	3	3	0	6
2	Finland	Sami Elopuro, Pentti Pekkanen, Juha Raumolin, Kai Peltonen	3	2	1	4
3	Sweden	Fredrik Johnson, Daniel Forslund, Peter Sjosten, Anders Thoren	3	1	2	2
4	Netherlands	Lucas Buit, Michael Vertogen, Eric van der Pluijm, Peter Paul Scheeder	3	0	3	0

=== Semi-finals ===
Team one	Team two	Score
England	Pakistan	1-2
Australia	Finland	2-1

=== Third Place Play Off ===
Team one	Team two	Score
England	Finland	3-0

=== Final ===
Pakistan
3
FINAL
Karachi, Pakistan
30 November 1993

Australia
0

			1	2	3	4	5
1	(Pakistan) (Australia)	Jahangir Khan; Brett Martin	6; 9	9; 1	9; 5	9; 3
2	(Pakistan) (Australia)	Zarak Jahan Khan; Rodney Eyles	9; 4	9; 2	6; 9	2; 9	10; 9
3	(Pakistan) (Australia)	Jansher Khan; Rodney Martin	9; 2	9; 0	9; 0

== See also ==
- World Team Squash Championships
- World Squash Federation
- World Open (squash)

Preceded by Finland; 1991	Squash World Team; Pakistan; 1993	Succeeded by Egypt; 1995
