= 1988 Men's World Open Squash Championship =

Men's World Open 1988
- 12th PSA World Squash Championship
- Location: Amsterdam, Netherlands
- Date: May 10–14, 1988

PSA World Tour
- Category: World Open
- Prize money: $ 82,000

Results
- Champion: (Pakistan) Jahangir Khan
- Runner-up: (Pakistan) Jansher Khan
- Semi-finalists: (Australia) Chris Dittmar (New Zealand) Ross Norman

The 1988 PSA Men's NCM World Open Squash Championship is the men's edition of the 1988 World Open, which serves as the individual world championship for squash players. The event took place in Valkenswaard and Amsterdam in the Netherlands from 9 May to 13 May 1988. Jahangir Khan won his sixth and last World Open title, defeating Jansher Khan in the final.

== Seeds ==
1. (Pakistan) Jansher Khan (final)
2. (Pakistan) Jahangir Khan (champion)
3. (Australia) Chris Dittmar (semifinals)
4. (New Zealand) Ross Norman (semifinals)
5. (Australia) Rodney Martin (quarterfinals)
6. (Australia) Chris Robertson (quarterfinals)
7. (Pakistan) Umar Hayat Khan (quarterfinals)
8. (Australia) Ross Thorne (second round)

== Draw and results ==
Second round
1 | (Pakistan) Jansher Khan | 9 | 9 | 9
(Netherlands) Hans Frieling | 3 | 0 | 1
(England) Phil Kenyon | 9 | 9 | 9
(England) Hiddy Jahan | 3 | 0 | 1
6 | (Australia) Chris Robertson | 5 | 9 | 9 | 9
(England) Martin Bodimeade | 9 | 3 | 0 | 2
(England) Bryan Beeson | 9 | 9 | 9
(Finland) Sami Elopuro | 2 | 7 | 6
4 | (New Zealand) Ross Norman | 9 | 9 | 9
(England) Gawain Briars | 1 | 6 | 6
(England) Geoff Williams | 9 | 9 | 9
(England) Phil Whitlock | 4 | 3 | 5
(England) Del Harris | 9 | 9 | 6 | 9
8 | (Australia) Ross Thorne | 5 | 6 | 9 | 3
(New Zealand) Rory Watt | 9 | 4 | 9 | 9
(Pakistan) Qamar Zaman | 7 | 9 | 5 | 1
3 | (Australia) Chris Dittmar | 9 | 9 | 9
(Sweden) Anders Wahlstedt | 7 | 4 | 2
(Pakistan) Maqsood Ahmed | 10 | 9 | 9
(Pakistan) Zarak Jahan Khan | 8 | 1 | 7
5 | (Australia) Rodney Martin | 9 | 9 | 9
(Australia) Rodney Eyles | 3 | 4 | 1
(England) Neil Harvey | 9 | 9 | 9
(England) Jamie Hickox | 5 | 7 | 7
2 | (Pakistan) Jahangir Khan | 9 | 9 | 9
(Australia) Austin Adarraga | 1 | 0 | 2
(Australia) Ricki Hill | 9 | 9 | 9
(Sweden) Jan-Ulf Söderberg | 4 | 0 | 1
7 | (Pakistan) Umar Hayat Khan | 9 | 9 | 9
(Sweden) Fredrik Johnson | 3 | 4 | 1
(Australia) Brett Martin | 9 | 9 | 4 | 9
(Pakistan) Mir Zaman Gul | 6 | 7 | 9 | 4

Third round
1 | (Pakistan) Jansher | 9 | 9 | 9
(England) Kenyon | 2 | 0 | 3
6 | (Australia) Robertson | 9 | 9 | 9
(England) Beeson | 7 | 3 | 4
4 | (New Zealand) Norman | 7 | 10 | 9 | 9
(England) Williams | 9 | 8 | 0 | 1
(England) Harris | 9 | 2 | 9 | 9
(New Zealand) Watt | 3 | 9 | ? | 7
3 | (Australia) Dittmar | 9 | 9 | 9
(Pakistan) Ahmed | 0 | 0 | 1
5 | (Australia) R Martin | 9 | 8 | 9 | 9
(England) Harvey | 7 | 10 | 7 | 2
2 | (Pakistan) Jahangir | 9 | 9 | 9
(Australia) Hill | 2 | 1 | 1
7 | (Pakistan) U H Khan | 9 | 9 | 9
(Australia) Martin B | 5 | 1 | 5

Quarter-finals
1 | (Pakistan) Jansher | 9 | 9 | 9
6 | (Australia) Robertson | 4 | 4 | 2
4 | (New Zealand) Norman | 9 | 9 | 9
(England) Harris | 6 | 3 | 2
3 | (Australia) Dittmar | 4 | 9 | 9 | 9
5 | (Australia) R Martin | 9 | 1 | 3 | 7
2 | (Pakistan) Jahangir | 9 | 9 | 9
7 | (Pakistan) U H Khan | 1 | 1 | 4

Semi-finals
1 | (Pakistan) Jansher | 9 | 9 | 7 | 9
4 | (New Zealand) Norman | 7 | 2 | 9 | 3
Final
1 | (Pakistan) Jansher | 6 | 2 | 2
2 | (Pakistan) Jahangir | 9 | 9 | 9
3 | (Australia) Dittmar | 7 | 4 | 5
2 | (Pakistan) Jahangir | 9 | 9 | 9

== See also ==
- PSA World Open

| Preceded by England (Birmingham); 1987 | World Open; Netherlands (Amsterdam); 1988 | Succeeded by Kuala Lumpur (Malaysia); 1989 |
