= 1987 Men's World Open Squash Championship =

Men's World Open 1987
- 11th PSA World Squash Championship]
- Location: Birmingham, England
- Date: 11–20 October 1987
- Category: World Open
- Prize money: $30,000

Results
- Champion: (Pakistan) Jansher Khan
- Runner-up: (Australia) Chris Dittmar
- Semi-finalists: (Australia) Rodney Martin (Pakistan) Jahangir Khan

The 1987 ICI Perspex Men's World Open Squash Championship is the men's edition of the 1987 World Open, which serves as the individual world championship for squash players. The event took place in Birmingham in England from 11 to 20 October 1987. Jansher Khan won his first World Open title, defeating Chris Dittmar in the final.

== Seeds ==
1. (Pakistan) Jahangir Khan (semi-finals)
2. (New Zealand) Ross Norman (third round)
3. (New Zealand) Stuart Davenport (quarter-finals)
4. (Pakistan) Jansher Khan (champion)
5. (Australia) Chris Dittmar (final)
6. (Australia) Rodney Martin (semi-finals)
7. (England) Phil Kenyon (third round)
8. (Australia) Chris Robertson (quarter-finals)

== Draw and results ==
Second round
1	(Pakistan) Jahangir Khan	9	9	9
(Sweden) Anders Wahlstedt	3	0	7
(Australia) Tristan Nancarrow	9	6	9	1	9
(Egypt) Gamal el-Amir	4	9	5	9	4
8	(Australia) Chris Robertson	5	9	10	9
(Egypt) Magdi Saad	9	5	8	6
(Pakistan) Zarak Jahan Khan	6	2	9	9	9
(Australia) Ross Thorne	9	9	6	7	1
4	(Pakistan) Jansher Khan	9	9	9
(Australia) Brett Martin	1	5	0
(England) Hiddy Jahan	9	8	9	6	9
(England) Martin Bodimeade	4	10	6	9	7
(Pakistan) Umar Hayat Khan	9	2	9	3	9
7	(England) Phil Kenyon	7	9	7	9	0
(Australia) Rodney Eyles	9	9	4	9
(England) Paul Carter	3	2	9	3
5	(Australia) Chris Dittmar	9	9	9
(Egypt) Ahmed Taher	6	2	5
(England) Gawain Briars	9	9	9
(England) Phil Whitlock	3	2	0
3	(New Zealand) Stuart Davenport	9	9	9
(England) Danny Meddings	3	3	3
(England) Jamie Hickox	9	9	9
(England) Geoff Williams	5	2	2
2	(New Zealand) Ross Norman	9	9	9
(Sweden) Fredrik Johnson	7	7	5
(England) Neil Harvey	9	5	10	9
(Scotland) Mark Maclean	1	9	8	0
6	(Australia) Rodney Martin	9	9	9
(Wales) Cerryg Jones	6	3	7
(Pakistan) Maqsood Ahmed	9	7	9	9
(Australia) Mark Robberds	3	9	4	2

Third round
1	(Pakistan) Jahangir Khan	9	9	9
(Australia) Nanacarrow	3	1	2
8	(Australia) Robertson	4	9	9	7	9
(Pakistan) Z J Khan	9	4	4	9	5
4	(Pakistan) Jansher Khan	9	9	9
(England) Jahan	0	6	3
(Pakistan) Umar Hayat Khan	?	?	?
(Australia) Eyles	?	?	?
5	(Australia) Chris Dittmar	9	9	9
(England) Briars	7	7	0
3	(New Zealand) Davenport	9	9	9
(England) Hickox	3	5	?
2	(New Zealand) Norman	9	9	9	5	7
(England) Harvey	2	10	4	9	9
6	(Australia) R Martin	9	9	9
(Pakistan) Ahmed	3	3	1

Quarter finals
1	(Pakistan) Jahangir Khan	9	10	9
8	(Australia) Robertson	5	8	6
4	(Pakistan) Jansher Khan	9	7	9	9
(Pakistan) U H Khan	3	9	0	7
5	(Australia) Chris Dittmar	9	9	9
3	(New Zealand) Davenport	4	3	4
(England) Harvey	5	2	7
6	(Australia) R Martin	9	9	9

Semi-finals
1	(Pakistan) Jahangir Khan	9	4	7	7
4	(Pakistan) Jansher Khan	3	9	9	9
Final
4	(Pakistan) Jansher Khan	9	9	4	9
5	(Australia) Chris Dittmar	5	4	9	6
5	(Australia) Chris Dittmar	10	9	4	9
6	(Australia) R Martin	9	2	9	4

=== Notes ===
Jansher Khan won the first of eight world titles.
Gamal Awad received a one-year ban for a physical assault upon the referee Paul Danby. The assault took place during the first round match between Awad and Cerryg Jones.

== See also ==
- PSA World Open
- 1987 Women's World Open Squash Championship

Preceded by France (Toulouse); 1986	World Open; England (Birmingham); 1987	Succeeded by Amsterdam (Netherlands); 1988
