= 1989 Men's World Team Squash Championships =

Men's World Team 1989
- 12th World Men's Team Championship
- Location: Singapore
- Date: October 09 - October 16, 1989

Results
- Champions: Australia
- Runners-up: Pakistan
- Third place: England

The 1989 Men's Singapore Airlines & Ascot Sport World Team Squash Championships were held in Singapore and took place from October 9 until October 16, 1989.

== Seeds ==
1. Pakistan
2. Australia
3. England
4. New Zealand

== Results ==
=== Pool A ===
Team one	Team two	Score
Pakistan	New Zealand	3-0
Pakistan	Sweden	3-0
Pakistan	Canada	3-0
Pakistan	Scotland	3-0
Pakistan	France	3-0
New Zealand	Sweden	2-1
New Zealand	Canada	3-0
New Zealand	Scotland	3-0
New Zealand	France	3-0
Sweden	Canada	2-1
Sweden	Scotland	3-0
Sweden	France	3-0
Canada	Scotland	2-1
Canada	France	2-1
Scotland	France	2-1

Pos	Nation	Team	P	W	L	Pts
1	Pakistan	Jansher Khan, Jahangir Khan, Umar Hayat Khan, Zarak Jahan Khan	5	5	0	10
2	New Zealand	Ross Norman, Stephen Cunningham, Rory Watt, Scott Harrison	5	4	1	8
3	Sweden	Fredrik Johnson, Anders Wahlstedt, Jonas Gornerup, Björn Almström	5	3	2	6
4	Canada	Gary Waite, Sabir Butt, Jamie Crombie, Gene Turk	5	2	3	4
5	Scotland	Mark Maclean, Frank Ellis, Alan Thomson, Graeme Sword	5	1	4	2
5	France	John Elstob, Julien Bonetat, Eric Claudel, Alexandre Denis	5	0	5	0

=== Pool B ===
Team one	Team two	Score
Australia	England	3-0
Australia	Finland	3-0
Australia	Egypt	3-0
Australia	Singapore	3-0
Australia	Netherlands	3-0
England	Finland	3-0
England	Egypt	3-0
England	Singapore	3-0
England	Netherlands	3-0
Finland	Egypt	2-1
Finland	Singapore	3-0
Finland	Netherlands	3-0
Egypt	Singapore	3-0
Egypt	Netherlands	3-0
Singapore	Netherlands	2-1

Pos	Nation	Team	P	W	L	Pts
1	Australia	Chris Dittmar, Rodney Martin, Chris Robertson, Brett Martin	5	5	0	10
2	England	Del Harris, Jason Nicolle, Bryan Beeson, Simon Parke	5	4	1	8
3	Finland	Sami Elopuro, Pentti Pekkanen, Marko Pulli	5	3	2	6
4	Egypt	Ahmed Tahir, Amir Wagih, Gamal El Amir, Atef Khalifa	5	2	3	4
5	Singapore	Peter Hill, Zainal Abidin, Anthony Chua	5	1	4	2
5	Netherlands	Hans Frieling, Raymond Scheffer, Erik van der Pluijm, Michael Vertogen	5	0	5	0

=== Quarter-finals ===
Team one	Team two	Score
New Zealand	Finland	3-0
Pakistan	Egypt	3-0
England	Sweden	3-0
Australia	Canada	3-0

=== Semi-finals ===
Team one	Team two	Score
Australia	New Zealand	3-0
Pakistan	England	3-0

=== Third Place Play Off ===
Team one	Team two	Score
England	New Zealand	2-1

=== Final ===
Australia
3
FINAL
Royal Albert Hall, London, Singapore
16 October 1989

Pakistan
0

			1	2	3	4	5
1	(Australia) (Pakistan)	Chris Robertson; Zarak Jahan Khan	3; 9	9; 9	9; 2	9; 2
2	(Australia) (Pakistan)	Chris Dittmar; Jahangir Khan	6; 9	9; 5	9; 3	9; 0
3	(Australia) (Pakistan)	Rodney Martin; Jansher Khan	9; 10	9; 3	9; 6	9; 1

Preceded by England; 1987	Squash World Team; Singapore; 1989	Succeeded by Finland; 1991

== See also ==
- World Team Squash Championships
- World Squash Federation
- World Open (squash)
