= 1989 Men's World Open Squash Championship =

Men's World Open 1989
- 13th PSA World Squash Championship
- Location: Kuala Lumpur, Malaysia
- Date: October 1–7, 1989

PSA World Tour
- Category: World Open
- Prize money: $ 85,000

Results
- Champion: (Pakistan) Jansher Khan
- Runner-up: (Australia) Chris Dittmar
- Semi-finalists: (Australia) Chris Robertson (Pakistan) Jahangir Khan

The 1989 PSA Men's Singer World Open Squash Championship is the men's edition of the 1989 World Open, which serves as the individual world championship for squash players. The event took place in Kuala Lumpur in Malaysia from 03-7 October 1989. Jansher Khan won his second World Open title, defeating Chris Dittmar in the final.

== Seeds ==
1. (Pakistan) Jahangir Khan (semifinals)
2. (Pakistan) Jansher Khan (champion)
3. (Australia) Chris Dittmar (final)
4. (Australia) Rodney Martin (second round)
5. (Australia) Chris Robertson (semifinals)
6. (Australia) Rodney Eyles (quarterfinals)
7. (Pakistan) Umar Hayat Khan (second round)
8. (Pakistan) Mir Zaman Gul (first round)

== Draw and results ==
First round
1	(Pakistan) Jahangir Khan	15	10	15	15
(England) Phil Whitlock	11	15	6	8
(New Zealand) Rory Watt	15	15	15
(England) Chris Walker	12	7	7
(Scotland) Mark Maclean	4	11	15	15	15
(England) Simon Parke	15	15	13	14	7
7	(Pakistan) Umar Hayat Khan	15	15	15
(Egypt) Ahmed Taher	13	6	9
3	(Australia) Chris Dittmar	15	15	15
(England) Paul Gregory	1	11	2
(Scotland) Stuart Hailstone	4	4	15	15	15
(England) Jamie Hickox	15	15	4	7	13
6	(Australia) Rodney Eyles	6	15	15	15
(Finland) Pentti Pekkanen	15	8	9	5
(Australia) Anthony Hill	15	15	5	15
(New Zealand) Ross Norman	14	11	15	13
5	(Australia) Chris Robertson	4	15	15	8	16
(England) Geoff Williams	15	9	9	15	10
(Pakistan) Sohail Qaiser	13	7	15	15	15
(Australia) Tristan Nancarrow	15	15	2	8	10
4	(Australia) Rodney Martin	15	15	15
(England) Danny Meddings	12	14	10
(Australia) Brett Martin	14	15	10	15	15
(Finland) Sami Elopuro	17	10	15	10	10
2	(Pakistan) Jansher Khan	13	15	15	15
(Wales) Adrian Davies	15	4	8	6
(England) Phil Kenyon	17	15	15
(Sweden) Fredrik Johnson	15	8	8
(England) Bryan Beeson	15	14	15	15
(Pakistan) Zarak Jahan Khan	5	17	9	13
8	(Pakistan) Mir Zaman Gul	10	12	15	4
(England) Jason Nicolle	15	15	6	15

Second round
1	(Pakistan) Jahangir	15	15	15
(New Zealand) Watt	5	11	?
(Scotland) Maclean	10	9	15	15	15
7	(Pakistan) U H Khan	15	15	13	12	10
3	(Australia) Dittmar	15	15	15
(Scotland) Hailstone	7	7	4
6	(Australia) Eyles	15	14	15	15	15
(Australia) Hill	10	17	17	9	13
5	(Australia) Robertson	15	15	15
(Pakistan) Qaiser	13	10	7
4	(Australia) Martin R	14	11	15	15	10
(Australia) Martin B	115	15	9	14	15
2	(Pakistan) Jansher	15	15	15
(England) Kenyon	2	7	8
(England) Beeson	15	15	15
(England) Nicolle	7	13	6

Quarter-finals
1	(Pakistan) Jahangir	15	15	15
(Scotland) Maclean	11	11	12
3	(Australia) Dittmar	15	15	10	15
6	(Australia) Eyles	3	8	15	12
5	(Australia) Robertson	15	17	8	15
(Australia) Martin B	12	15	15	13
2	(Pakistan) Jansher	15	15	15
(England) Beeson	7	2	3

Semi-finals
1	(Pakistan) Jahangir	9	15	9	15	13
3	(Australia) Dittmar	15	12	15	9	15
Final
3	(Australia) Dittmar	15	15	4	11	10
2	(Pakistan) Jansher	10	6	15	15	15
5	(Australia) Robertson	3	12	6
2	(Pakistan) Jansher	15	15	15

== Notes ==
The reign of Jahangir Khan had ended and was taken up by Jansher Khan who would win eight titles.

== See also ==
- PSA World Open
- 1989 Women's World Open Squash Championship

Preceded by Netherlands (Amsterdam); 1988	World Open; Malaysia (Kuala Lumpur); 1989	Succeeded by Toulouse (France); 1990
