= 1991 Men's World Open Squash Championship =

Men's World Open 1991
- 15th PSA World Squash Championship
- Location: Adelaide, Australia
- Date: July 30-August 4, 1991

PSA World Tour
- Category: World Open
- Prize money: $ 130,000

Results
- Champion: (Australia) Rodney Martin
- Runner-up: (Pakistan) Jahangir Khan
- Semi-finalists: (Australia) Chris Dittmar (Australia) Chris Robertson

The 1991 PSA Men's World Open Squash Championship is the men's edition of the 1991 World Open, which serves as the individual world championship for squash players. The event took place in Adelaide in Australia from 30 July to 4 August 1991. Rodney Martin won his first World Open title, defeating Jahangir Khan in the final.

== Seeds ==
1. (Pakistan) Jansher Khan (Querterfinals)
2. (Pakistan) Jahangir Khan (Final)
3. (Australia) Chris Dittmar (Semifinals)
4. (Australia) Chris Robertson (Semifinals)

== Draw and results ==
First round
1	(Pakistan) Jansher Khan	15	15	15
(England) Mark Cairns	11	11	5
(Finland) Sami Elopuro	15	12	15	13	15
(England) John Ransome	13	15	5	15	8
(Australia) Rodney Martin	16	15	15	15
(England) Jason Nicolle	17	10	10	11
(Australia) Adam Schreiber	15	15	15
(Pakistan) Mir Zaman Gul	5	11	14
3	(Australia) Chris Dittmar	15	15	15
(Australia) Brett Newton	8	6	7
(Australia) Craig Rowland	15	6	15	15
(Wales) Adrian Davies	11	15	12	13
(Australia) Anthony Hill	15	12	15	15
(Australia) Rodney Eyles	11	15	7	10
(Australia) Tristan Nancarrow	15	15	15
(Australia) John Williams	5	9	7
4	(Australia) Chris Robertson	w/o
(Pakistan) Umar Hayat Khan	scr
(England) Del Harris	6	15	15	15
(England) Phil Whitlock	15	7	11	11
(Australia) Brett Martin	15	15	15
(Australia) Simon Baker	9	12	13
(England) Simon Parke	15	15	15
(Australia) Scott Spillane	8	9	12
2	(Pakistan) Jahangir Khan	15	15	12	15
(England) Paul Carter	8	7	15	10
(England) Peter Marshall	15	15	15
(England) Chris Walker	7	4	7
(New Zealand) Ross Norman	13	15	15	13	15
(Australia) Billy Haddrell	15	11	11	15	11
(Spain) Austin Adarraga	12	3	15	15	15
(England) Bryan Beeson	15	15	4	13	8

Second round
1	(Pakistan) Jansher K	15	15	15
(Finland) Elopuro	12	7	9
(Australia) Martin R	15	15	15
(Australia) Schreiber	10	10	11
3	(Australia) Dittmar	15	15	15
(Australia) Rowland	3	1	7
(Australia) Hill	17	15	11	13	15
(Australia) Nancarrow	15	11	15	15	5
4	(Australia) Robertson	15	15	15
(England) Harris	9	11	9
(Australia) Martin B	16	15	15	15
(England) Parke	17	13	9	9
2	(Pakistan) Jahangir K	15	15	15
(England) Marshall	5	8	7
(New Zealand) Norman	15	15	17
(Spain) Adarraga	9	11	14

Quarter-finals
1	(Pakistan) Jansher K	8	7	9
(Australia) Martin R	15	15	15
3	(Australia) Dittmar	15	15	15
(Australia) Hill	6	3	6
4	(Australia) Robertson	15	8	15	15
(Australia) Martin B	13	15	12	12
2	(Pakistan) Jahangir K	15	15	15
(New Zealand) Norman	5	5	7

Semi-finals
(Australia) Martin R	5	15	17	15
3	(Australia) Dittmar	15	13	14	13
Final
(Australia) Martin R	14	15	15	15
2	(Pakistan) Jahangir K	17	9	4	13
4	(Australia) Robertson	3	15	6	4
2	(Pakistan) Jahangir K	15	14	15	15

== See also ==
- PSA World Open
- 1990 Women's World Open Squash Championship

Preceded by France (Toulouse); 1990	World Open; Australia (Adelaide); 1991	Succeeded by Johannesburg (South Africa); 1992
