= 1992 Men's World Open Squash Championship =

Men's World Open 1992
- 16th PSA World Squash Championship
- Location: Johannesburg, South Africa
- Date: 21–26 September 1992

PSA World Tour
- Category: World Open
- Prize money: $ 160,000

Results
- Champion: (Pakistan) Jansher Khan
- Runner-up: (Australia) Chris Dittmar
- Semi-finalists: (England) Rodney Martin (Spain) Austin Adarraga

The 1992 PSA Men's World Open Squash Championship is the men's edition of the 1992 World Open, which serves as the individual world championship for squash players. The event took place in Johannesburg in South Africa from 21 September to 26 September 1992. Jansher Khan won his fourth World Open title, defeating Chris Dittmar in the final.

== Seeds ==
1. (Pakistan) Jansher Khan (champion)
2. (Australia) Chris Dittmar (final)
3. (Australia) Rodney Martin (semifinals)
4. (Pakistan) Jahangir Khan (second round)
5. (Australia) Brett Martin (Querterfinals)
6. (Australia) Tristan Nancarrow (second round)
7. (New Zealand) Ross Norman (second round)
8. (Finland) Sami Elopuro (Querterfinals)

== Draw and results ==
First round
1	(Pakistan) Jansher Khan	15	15	15
(France) Julien Bonetat	9	9	10
(England) Tony Hands	15	15	15
(Scotland) Mark Maclean	13	11	10
8	(Finland) Sami Elopuro	13	15	15	17
(Hong Kong) Abdul Faheem Khan	15	11	6	15
(England) Chris Walker	15	15	15
(Republic of Ireland) Derek Ryan	13	8	12
4	(Pakistan) Jahangir Khan	15	15	15
(Germany) Hansi Wiens	7	11	7
(England) Peter Marshall	15	15	15
(Scotland) Stuart Hailstone	8	10	3
(Spain) Austin Adarraga	15	15	15
(England) Simon Parke	10	9	5
7	(New Zealand) Ross Norman	15	10	15	14	15
(Wales) Adrian Davies	9	15	12	17	10
3	(Australia) Rodney Martin	8	15	15	15
(England) Phil Whitlock	15	9	11	4
(South Africa) Craig Van der Wath	9	7	13
(England) Del Harris	15	15	15
5	(Australia) Brett Martin	15	15	15
(England) Danny Meddings	11	6	9
(Australia) Mark Carlyon	15	15	11	14	15
(England) Jason Nicolle	4	10	15	17	4
2	(Australia) Chris Dittmar	13	15	15	15
(Australia) Anthony Hill	15	13	5	11
(Canada) Gary Waite	10	17	15	15
(England) Bryan Beeson	15	15	7	8
(Australia) Rodney Eyles	15	15	14	15
(Australia) John Williams	13	10	17	11
6	(Australia) Tristan Nancarrow	15	15	15
(South Africa) Mike Tootill	10	7	9

Second round
1	(Pakistan) Jansher K	15	15	16	15
(England) Hands	3	7	17	9
8	(Finland) Elopuro	11	15	15	17
(England) Walker	15	8	14	16
4	(Pakistan) Jahangir K	15	15	2	7	ret
(England) Marshall	12	13	15	15
(Spain) Adarraga	15	15	15
7	(New Zealand) Norman	8	9	4
3	(Australia) Martin R	15	17	15
(England) Harris	10	15	15
5	(Australia) Martin B	15	17	15
(Australia) Carlyon	10	15	12
2	(Australia) Dittmar	15	15	15
(Canada) Waite	6	10	5
(Australia) Eyles	15	15	15
6	(Australia) Nancarrow	12	7	4

Quarter-finals
1	(Pakistan) Jansher K	15	15	15
8	(Finland) Elopuro	7	5	9
(England) Marshall	3	12	15	15	10
(Spain) Adarraga	15	15	9	10	15
3	(Australia) Martin R	17	15	15	15	15
5	(Australia) Martin B	16	5	17	17	10
2	(Australia) Dittmar	15	15	15
(Australia) Eyles	10	7	4

Semi-finals
1	(Pakistan) Jansher K	15	13	15	15
(Spain) Adarraga	5	15	7	8
Final
1	(Pakistan) Jansher K	15	15	10	15
2	(Australia) Dittmar	11	9	15	6
3	(Australia) Martin R	5	9	15	6
2	(Australia) Dittmar	15	15	10	15

== See also ==
- PSA World Open
- 1992 Women's World Open Squash Championship

Preceded by Australia (Adelaide); 1991	World Open; South Africa (Johannesburg); 1992	Succeeded by Pakistan (Karachi); 1993
