= 1990 Men's World Open Squash Championship =

Men's World Open 1990
- 14th PSA World Squash Championship
- Location: Toulouse, France
- Date: November 4–11, 1990

PSA World Tour
- Category: World Open
- Prize money: $ 110,000

Results
- Champion: (Pakistan) Jansher Khan
- Runner-up: (Australia) Chris Dittmar
- Semi-finalists: (Australia) Chris Robertson (Australia) Tristan Nancarrow

The 1990 PSA Men's World Open Squash Championship is the men's edition of the 1990 World Open, which serves as the individual world championship for squash players. The event took place in Toulouse in France from 4 November to 11 November 1990. Jansher Khan won his third World Open title, defeating Chris Dittmar in the final.

== Seeds ==
1. (Pakistan) Jahangir Khan (Withdrawn)
2. (Pakistan) Jansher Khan (Champion)
3. (Australia) Chris Robertson (Semifinals)
4. (Australia) Rodney Martin (Quarterfinals)
5. (Australia) Chris Dittmar (Final)
6. (Australia) Brett Martin (Quarterfinals)
7. (Australia) Tristan Nancarrow (Semifinals)
8. (Pakistan) Mir Zaman Gul (Quarterfinals)

=== Notes ===
Jahangir Khan the world number one and top seed withdrew from the tournament due to injury and illness.

== Draw and results ==
First round
(Scotland) Stuart Hailstone	15	15	15
(Sweden) Fredrik Johnson	10	3	7
7	(Australia) Tristan Nancarrow	11	15	15	15
(England) Robert Graham	15	10	9	4
8	(Pakistan) Mir Zaman Gul	15	17	5	12	15
(England) Jason Nicolle	10	16	15	15	9
(Canada) Jamie Hickox	15	4	15	9	15
14	(Finland) Sami Elopuro	11	15	14	15	14
5	(Australia) Chris Dittmar	15	15	17
(England) Peter Marshall	11	9	14
12	(England) Del Harris	15	15	15
16	(England) Chris Walker	13	6	11
(England) Paul Carter	15	8	11	15	15
(England) Bryan Beeson	12	15	15	12	7
(New Zealand) Rory Watt	15	9	15	15
(Canada) Sabir Butt	11	15	8	12
3	(Australia) Chris Robertson	15	15	15
(France) Julien Bonetat	10	10	8
(England) Phil Kenyon	13	15	15	15
(England) Stephen Meads	15	13	5	6
6	(Australia) Brett Martin	3
(England) Danny Meddings	1
9	(Scotland) Mark Maclean	15	15	15
(England) Colin Payne	11	4	3
2	(Pakistan) Jansher Khan	15	15	15
(England) Mark Cairns	8	1	7
(Wales) Adrian Davies	15	8	11	15	15
(England) Phil Whitlock	12	15	15	12	7
13	(New Zealand) Ross Norman	15	15	15
(England) Simon Parke	7	6	5
4	(Australia) Rodney Martin	15	15	15
(Australia) Adam Schreiber	13	8	1

Second round
(Scotland) Hailstone	13	5	11
7	(Australia) Nancarrow	15	15	15
8	(Pakistan) Gul	8	13	15	15
(Canada) Hickox	15	15	13	10
5	(Australia) Dittmar	15	15	15
12	(England) Harris	14	6	7
(England) Carter	15	10	15	15
(New Zealand) Watt	8	15	13	11
3	(Australia) Robertson	15	15	15
(England) Kenyon	12	13	13
6	(Australia) Martin B	11	15	17	15
9	(Scotland) Maclean	15	9	15	7
2	(Pakistan) Jansher	15	15	15
(Wales) Davies	7	5	9
13	(New Zealand) Norman	15	15	8	9	15
4	(Australia) Martin R	14	12	15	15	13

Quarter-finals
7	(Australia) Nancarrow	15	17	9	15
8	(Pakistan) Gul	4	16	15	8
5	(Australia) Dittmar	15	15	15
(England) Carter	0	6	2
3	(Australia) Robertson	15	9	15	15
6	(Australia) Martin	13	15	7	8
2	(Pakistan) Jansher	15	15	15
13	(New Zealand) Norman	12	7	8

Semi-finals
8	(Australia) Nancarrow	8	3	7
5	(Australia) Dittmar	15	15	15
Final
5	(Australia) Dittmar	8	15	15	5
2	(Pakistan) Jansher	15	17	13	15
3	(Australia) Robertson	15	5	13	11
2	(Pakistan) Jansher	10	15	15	15

== See also ==
- PSA World Open
- 1990 Women's World Open Squash Championship

Preceded by Malaysia (Kuala Lumpur); 1989	World Open; France (Toulouse); 1990	Succeeded by Adelaide (Australia); 1991
