= Men's Squash World Rankings =

Official world ranking for men's squash

Dunlop PSA World Ranking

The Men's Squash World Rankings are the official world rankings for men's squash. The ranking is to rate the performance level of male professional squash players. It is also a merit-based method used for determining entry and seeding in men's squash tournaments. The rankings have been produced monthly then weekly since 29 August 2022.

== PSA ranking policy ==
Players competing in PSA tournaments earn ranking points according to how far they get in the draw. The points available depend on the prize money and the draw size. The weekly rankings (issued on each Monday) are used in selecting entries to tournaments and in determining the seeds.

The total number of points a player has earned in the previous 52 weeks is divided by the number of tournaments played (a minimum divisor of 11 is used) to give a ranking average. Where a player has played more than 11 tournaments the best scores are selected (i.e. the lowest are not included) according to the averaging formula (see table below).

For example, a player who has competed in 16 events will have his best 12 scores used. These will be accumulated and divided by 12.

Players competing in PSA World Tour Events earn ranking points according to the prize money, classification of the event, and the final position in the draw the player reaches.

Tournament			Ranking Points						
Rank	Prize Money US$	Ranking Points	Winner	Runner up	3/4	5/8	9/16	17/32	33/48
World Championship	$600,000	27683 points	3500	2275	1400	875	525	321	196
Diamond	$300,000	24511 points	3100	2015	1240	775	465	284	173.5
Platinum	$190,000	17132 points	2800	1820	1120	700	420	257	
Gold	$100,000	11010 points	1800	1170	720	450	270	165	
Silver	$75,000	8261.5 points	1350	877.5	540	337.5	202.5	124	
Bronze	$50,000	5505 points	900	585	360	225	135	82.5	
Copper	$25,000	3061 points	500	325	200	125	75	46	
PSA Challenger Tour			Ranking Points						
Rank	Prize money US$	Ranking Points	Winner	Runner up	3/4	5/8	9/16	17/32	33/48
Challenger 30	$30,000	2814 points	525	345	210	130	78	47.5	
Challenger 20	$20,000	1860 points	350	230	140	85	51	31.5	
Challenger 15	$15,000	1343 points	250	162.5	100	62.5	37.5	22.5	
Challenger 12	$12,000	1074 points	200	130	80	50	30	18	
Challenger 9	$9,000	806 points	150	97.5	60	37.5	22.5	13.5	
Challenger 6	$6,000	537 points	100	65	40	25	15	9	
Challenger 3	$3,000	331 points	65	40	25	15	9	5.5	

=== Divisor ===
A divisor is selected based on the number of tournaments played during the year as shown in the table below (the minimum divisor is eleven). The average is calculated from the highest points scored for this number of events over the past 52 weeks:

Events Played	Divisor
1-15	11
16	12
17	13
18	14
19	15
20	16
21	17

== Current world ranking ==
PSA Men's World Rankings as of 1 September 2025
Rank	Player	Points	Move^{†}
1	Mostafa Asal (EGY)	2,338	Steady
2	Diego Elías (PER)	1,631	Steady
3	Paul Coll (NZL)	1,153	Steady
4	Joel Makin (WAL)	1,096	Steady
5	Marwan Elshorbagy (ENG)	847	Steady
6	Karim Gawad (EGY)	811	Steady
7	Mohamed Elshorbagy (ENG)	794	Steady
8	Youssef Soliman (EGY)	616	Steady
9	Aly Abou Eleinen (EGY)	580	Steady
10	Youssef Ibrahim (EGY)	578	Steady

Note: The weekly ranking for the men's squash (world ranking) is taken directly from the Professional Squash Association (PSA) official website.

== World No. 1 since 1975 ==
=== Number one ranked players ===
The following is a list of players who have achieved the world number one position since February 1975 (active players in green) :

#	Player	Date reached	Total months	Total weeks	Total days
1	(Pakistan) Qamar Zaman	January 1975	25		761
2	(Australia) Geoff Hunt	February 1976	59		1796
3	(Pakistan) Jahangir Khan	January 1982	94		2861
4	(Pakistan) Jansher Khan	January 1988	97		2952
5	(Australia) Chris Dittmar	July 1993	2		62
6	(Scotland) / (England) Peter Nicol	February 1998	60		1825
7	(Canada) Jonathon Power	May 1999	14		429
8	(Australia) David Palmer	September 2001	5		150
9	(France) Thierry Lincou	January 2004	14		425
10	(Scotland) John White	March 2004	2		61
11	(England) Lee Beachill	October 2004	3		92
12	(Egypt) Amr Shabana	April 2006	33		1006
13	(Egypt) Karim Darwish	January 2009	11		335
14	(France) Grégory Gaultier	November 2009	20		606
15	(Egypt) Ramy Ashour	January 2010	21		638
16	(England) Nick Matthew	June 2010	19		576
17	(England) James Willstrop	January 2012	11		337
18	(Egypt) Mohamed El Shorbagy	November 2014	50		1521
19	(Egypt) Karim Abdel Gawad	May 2017	1		31
20	(Egypt) Ali Farag	March 2019	29	113	1671
21	(New Zealand) Paul Coll	March 2022	3	2	106
22	(Egypt) Mostafa Asal	Jan 16, 2023		94	658
23	(Peru) Diego Elías	Apr 17, 2023		7	49

Last update: October 18 2026

=== Monthly World No 1 since 1975 ===
==== 2026-2029 ====
Month	2026	2027	2028	2029
January	(Egypt) Mostafa Asal			
February	(Egypt) Mostafa Asal			
March	(Egypt) Mostafa Asal			
April	(Egypt) Mostafa Asal			
May	(Egypt) Mostafa Asal			
June	(Egypt) Mostafa Asal			
July	(Egypt) Mostafa Asal			
August	(Egypt) Mostafa Asal			
September	(Egypt) Mostafa Asal			
October	(Egypt) Mostafa Asal			
November				
December				

==== 2022-2025 ====
Month	2022	2023	2024	2025
January	(Egypt) Ali Farag	(Egypt) A Farag then (Egypt) M Asal	(Egypt) Ali Farag	(Egypt) Ali Farag
February	(Egypt) Ali Farag	(Egypt) Mostafa Asal	(Egypt) Ali Farag	(Egypt) Ali Farag
March	(New Zealand) Paul Coll	(Egypt) Mostafa Asal	(Egypt) Ali Farag	(Egypt) A Farag then (Egypt) M Asal
April	(New Zealand) Paul Coll	(Egypt) M Asal then (Peru) D Elías	(Egypt) Ali Farag	(Egypt) Mostafa Asal
May	(New Zealand) Paul Coll	(Peru) Diego Elías	(Egypt) Ali Farag	(Egypt) Mostafa Asal
June	(Egypt) Ali Farag	(Peru) D Elías then (Egypt) A Farag	(Egypt) Ali Farag	(Egypt) Mostafa Asal
July	(Egypt) Ali Farag	(Egypt) Ali Farag	(Egypt) Ali Farag	(Egypt) Mostafa Asal
August	(Egypt) Ali Farag	(Egypt) Ali Farag	(Egypt) Ali Farag	(Egypt) Mostafa Asal
September	(Egypt) Ali Farag	(Egypt) Ali Farag	(Egypt) Ali Farag	(Egypt) Mostafa Asal
October	(New Zealand) P Coll then (Egypt) A Farag	(Egypt) Ali Farag	(Egypt) Ali Farag	(Egypt) Mostafa Asal
November	(Egypt) Ali Farag	(Egypt) Ali Farag	(Egypt) Ali Farag	(Egypt) Mostafa Asal
December	(Egypt) Ali Farag	(Egypt) Ali Farag	(Egypt) Ali Farag	(Egypt) Mostafa Asal

==== 2018-2021 ====
Month	2018	2019	2020	2021
January	(France) Grégory Gaultier	(Egypt) Mohd El Shorbagy	(Egypt) Ali Farag	(Egypt) Ali Farag
February	(France) Grégory Gaultier	(Egypt) Mohd El Shorbagy	(Egypt) Mohd El Shorbagy	(Egypt) Ali Farag
March	(Egypt) Mohd El Shorbagy	(Egypt) Ali Farag	(Egypt) Mohd El Shorbagy	(Egypt) Ali Farag
April	(Egypt) Mohd El Shorbagy	(Egypt) Ali Farag	(Egypt) Mohd El Shorbagy	(Egypt) Ali Farag
May	(Egypt) Mohd El Shorbagy	(Egypt) Ali Farag	(Egypt) Mohd El Shorbagy	(Egypt) Ali Farag
June	(Egypt) Mohd El Shorbagy	(Egypt) Ali Farag	(Egypt) Mohd El Shorbagy	(Egypt) Ali Farag
July	(Egypt) Mohd El Shorbagy	(Egypt) Ali Farag	(Egypt) Mohd El Shorbagy	(Egypt) Ali Farag
August	(Egypt) Mohd El Shorbagy	(Egypt) Ali Farag	(Egypt) Mohd El Shorbagy	(Egypt) Mohd El Shorbagy
September	(Egypt) Mohd El Shorbagy	(Egypt) Ali Farag	(Egypt) Mohd El Shorbagy	(Egypt) Ali Farag
October	(Egypt) Mohd El Shorbagy	(Egypt) Ali Farag	(Egypt) Mohd El Shorbagy	(Egypt) Ali Farag
November	(Egypt) Mohd El Shorbagy	(Egypt) Ali Farag	(Egypt) Ali Farag	(Egypt) Ali Farag
December	(Egypt) Mohd El Shorbagy	(Egypt) Ali Farag	(Egypt) Ali Farag	(Egypt) Ali Farag

==== 2014–2017 ====
Month	2014	2015	2016	2017
January	(England) Nick Matthew	(Egypt) Mohd El Shorbagy	(Egypt) Mohd El Shorbagy	(Egypt) Mohd El Shorbagy
February	G Gaultier / N Matthew	(Egypt) Mohd El Shorbagy	(Egypt) Mohd El Shorbagy	(Egypt) Mohd El Shorbagy
March	(England) Nick Matthew	(Egypt) Mohd El Shorbagy	(Egypt) Mohd El Shorbagy	(Egypt) Mohd El Shorbagy
April	(France) Grégory Gaultier	(Egypt) Mohd El Shorbagy	(Egypt) Mohd El Shorbagy	(France) Grégory Gaultier
May	(France) Grégory Gaultier	(Egypt) Mohd El Shorbagy	(Egypt) Mohd El Shorbagy	(Egypt) Karim Abdel Gawad
June	(France) Grégory Gaultier	(Egypt) Mohd El Shorbagy	(Egypt) Mohd El Shorbagy	(France) Grégory Gaultier
July	(France) Grégory Gaultier	(Egypt) Mohd El Shorbagy	(Egypt) Mohd El Shorbagy	(France) Grégory Gaultier
August	(France) Grégory Gaultier	(Egypt) Mohd El Shorbagy	(Egypt) Mohd El Shorbagy	(France) Grégory Gaultier
September	(France) Grégory Gaultier	(Egypt) Mohd El Shorbagy	(Egypt) Mohd El Shorbagy	(France) Grégory Gaultier
October	(France) Grégory Gaultier	(Egypt) Mohd El Shorbagy	(Egypt) Mohd El Shorbagy	(France) Grégory Gaultier
November	(Egypt) Mohd El Shorbagy	(Egypt) Mohd El Shorbagy	(Egypt) Mohd El Shorbagy	(France) Grégory Gaultier
December	(Egypt) Mohd El Shorbagy	(France) Grégory Gaultier	(Egypt) Mohd El Shorbagy	(France) Grégory Gaultier

==== 2010–2013 ====
Month	2010	2011	2012	2013
January	(Egypt) Ramy Ashour	(England) Nick Matthew	(England) James Willstrop	(Egypt) Ramy Ashour
February	(Egypt) Ramy Ashour	(England) Nick Matthew	(England) Nick Matthew	(Egypt) Ramy Ashour
March	(Egypt) Ramy Ashour	(England) Nick Matthew	(England) James Willstrop	(Egypt) Ramy Ashour
April	(Egypt) Ramy Ashour	(England) Nick Matthew	(England) James Willstrop	(Egypt) Ramy Ashour
May	(Egypt) Ramy Ashour	(England) Nick Matthew	(England) James Willstrop	(Egypt) Ramy Ashour
June	(England) Nick Matthew	(England) Nick Matthew	(England) James Willstrop	(Egypt) Ramy Ashour
July	(England) Nick Matthew	(England) Nick Matthew	(England) James Willstrop	(Egypt) Ramy Ashour
August	(England) Nick Matthew	(England) Nick Matthew	(England) James Willstrop	(Egypt) Ramy Ashour
September	(Egypt) Ramy Ashour	(England) Nick Matthew	(England) James Willstrop	(Egypt) Ramy Ashour
October	(Egypt) Ramy Ashour	(England) Nick Matthew	(England) James Willstrop	(Egypt) Ramy Ashour
November	(Egypt) Ramy Ashour	(England) Nick Matthew	(England) James Willstrop	(Egypt) Ramy Ashour
December	(Egypt) Ramy Ashour	(England) Nick Matthew	(England) James Willstrop	(Egypt) Ramy Ashour

==== 2006–2009 ====
Month	2006	2007	2008	2009
January	(Canada) Jonathon Power	(Egypt) Amr Shabana	(Egypt) Amr Shabana	(Egypt) Karim Darwish
February	(Australia) David Palmer	(Egypt) Amr Shabana	(Egypt) Amr Shabana	(Egypt) Karim Darwish
March	(Canada) Jonathon Power	(Egypt) Amr Shabana	(Egypt) Amr Shabana	(Egypt) Karim Darwish
April	(Egypt) Amr Shabana	(Egypt) Amr Shabana	(Egypt) Amr Shabana	(Egypt) Karim Darwish
May	(Egypt) Amr Shabana	(Egypt) Amr Shabana	(Egypt) Amr Shabana	(Egypt) Karim Darwish
June	(Egypt) Amr Shabana	(Egypt) Amr Shabana	(Egypt) Amr Shabana	(Egypt) Karim Darwish
July	(Egypt) Amr Shabana	(Egypt) Amr Shabana	(Egypt) Amr Shabana	(Egypt) Karim Darwish
August	(Egypt) Amr Shabana	(Egypt) Amr Shabana	(Egypt) Amr Shabana	(Egypt) Karim Darwish
September	(Egypt) Amr Shabana	(Egypt) Amr Shabana	(Egypt) Amr Shabana	(Egypt) Karim Darwish
October	(Egypt) Amr Shabana	(Egypt) Amr Shabana	(Egypt) Amr Shabana	(Egypt) Karim Darwish
November	(Egypt) Amr Shabana	(Egypt) Amr Shabana	(Egypt) Amr Shabana	(France) Grégory Gaultier
December	(Egypt) Amr Shabana	(Egypt) Amr Shabana	(Egypt) Amr Shabana	(Egypt) Karim Darwish

==== 2002–2005 ====
Month	2002	2003	2004	2005
January	(England) Peter Nicol	(England) Peter Nicol	(France) Thierry Lincou	(France) Thierry Lincou
February	(England) Peter Nicol	(England) Peter Nicol	(France) Thierry Lincou	(France) Thierry Lincou
March	(England) Peter Nicol	(England) Peter Nicol	(Scotland) John White	(France) Thierry Lincou
April	(England) Peter Nicol	(England) Peter Nicol	(Scotland) John White	(France) Thierry Lincou
May	(England) Peter Nicol	(England) Peter Nicol	(England) Peter Nicol	(France) Thierry Lincou
June	(England) Peter Nicol	(England) Peter Nicol	(England) Peter Nicol	(France) Thierry Lincou
July	(England) Peter Nicol	(England) Peter Nicol	(England) Peter Nicol	(France) Thierry Lincou
August	(England) Peter Nicol	(England) Peter Nicol	(England) Peter Nicol	(France) Thierry Lincou
September	(England) Peter Nicol	(England) Peter Nicol	(England) Peter Nicol	(France) Thierry Lincou
October	(England) Peter Nicol	(England) Peter Nicol	(England) Lee Beachill	(France) Thierry Lincou
November	(England) Peter Nicol	(England) Peter Nicol	(England) Lee Beachill	(France) Thierry Lincou
December	(England) Peter Nicol	(England) Peter Nicol	(England) Lee Beachill	(France) Thierry Lincou

==== 1998–2001 ====
Month	1998	1999	2000	2001
January	(Pakistan) Jansher Khan	(Scotland) Peter Nicol	(Canada) Jonathon Power	(Scotland) Peter Nicol
February	(Scotland) Peter Nicol	(Scotland) Peter Nicol	(Scotland) Peter Nicol	(Scotland) Peter Nicol
March	(Scotland) Peter Nicol	(Scotland) Peter Nicol	(Scotland) Peter Nicol	(Scotland) Peter Nicol
April	(Scotland) Peter Nicol	(Scotland) Peter Nicol	(Scotland) Peter Nicol	(Canada) Jonathon Power
May	(Scotland) Peter Nicol	(Canada) Jonathon Power	(Scotland) Peter Nicol	(Canada) Jonathon Power
June	(Scotland) Peter Nicol	(Canada) Jonathon Power	(Scotland) Peter Nicol	(Canada) Jonathon Power
July	(Scotland) Peter Nicol	(Canada) Jonathon Power	(Scotland) Peter Nicol	(Canada) Jonathon Power
August	(Scotland) Peter Nicol	(Canada) Jonathon Power	(Scotland) Peter Nicol	(England) Peter Nicol
September	(Scotland) Peter Nicol	(Canada) Jonathon Power	(Scotland) Peter Nicol	(Australia) David Palmer
October	(Scotland) Peter Nicol	(Scotland) Peter Nicol	(Scotland) Peter Nicol	(Australia) David Palmer
November	(Scotland) Peter Nicol	(Canada) Jonathon Power	(Scotland) Peter Nicol	(Australia) David Palmer
December	(Scotland) Peter Nicol	(Canada) Jonathon Power	(Scotland) Peter Nicol	(Australia) David Palmer

==== 1994–1997 ====
Month	1994	1995	1996	1997
January	(Pakistan) Jansher Khan	(Pakistan) Jansher Khan	(Pakistan) Jansher Khan	(Pakistan) Jansher Khan
March	(Pakistan) Jansher Khan	(Pakistan) Jansher Khan	(Pakistan) Jansher Khan	(Pakistan) Jansher Khan
May	(Pakistan) Jansher Khan	(Pakistan) Jansher Khan	(Pakistan) Jansher Khan	(Pakistan) Jansher Khan
July	(Pakistan) Jansher Khan	(Pakistan) Jansher Khan	(Pakistan) Jansher Khan	(Pakistan) Jansher Khan
September	(Pakistan) Jansher Khan	(Pakistan) Jansher Khan	(Pakistan) Jansher Khan	(Pakistan) Jansher Khan
November	(Pakistan) Jansher Khan	(Pakistan) Jansher Khan	(Pakistan) Jansher Khan	(Pakistan) Jansher Khan

==== 1990–1993 ====
Month	1990	1991	1992	1993
January	(Pakistan) Jansher Khan	(Pakistan) Jansher Khan	(Pakistan) Jahangir Khan	(Pakistan) Jansher Khan
March	(Pakistan) Jahangir Khan	(Pakistan) Jansher Khan	(Pakistan) Jahangir Khan	(Pakistan) Jansher Khan
May	(Pakistan) Jansher Khan	(Pakistan) Jansher Khan	(Pakistan) Jansher Khan	(Pakistan) Jansher Khan
July	(Pakistan) Jahangir Khan	(Pakistan) Jansher Khan	(Pakistan) Jansher Khan	(Australia) Chris Dittmar
September	(Pakistan) Jahangir Khan	(Pakistan) Jansher Khan	(Pakistan) Jansher Khan	(Pakistan) Jansher Khan
November	(Pakistan) Jansher Khan	(Pakistan) Jansher Khan	(Pakistan) Jansher Khan	(Pakistan) Jansher Khan

==== 1986–1989 ====
Month	1986	1987	1988	1989
January	(Pakistan) Jahangir Khan	(Pakistan) Jahangir Khan	(Pakistan) Jansher Khan	(Pakistan) Jahangir Khan
March	(Pakistan) Jahangir Khan	(Pakistan) Jahangir Khan	(Pakistan) Jansher Khan	(Pakistan) Jahangir Khan
May	(Pakistan) Jahangir Khan	(Pakistan) Jahangir Khan	(Pakistan) Jansher Khan	(Pakistan) Jahangir Khan
July	(Pakistan) Jahangir Khan	(Pakistan) Jahangir Khan	(Pakistan) Jansher Khan	(Pakistan) Jahangir Khan
September	(Pakistan) Jahangir Khan	(Pakistan) Jahangir Khan	(Pakistan) Jansher Khan	(Pakistan) Jahangir Khan
November	(Pakistan) Jahangir Khan	(Pakistan) Jahangir Khan	(Pakistan) Jahangir Khan	(Pakistan) Jansher Khan

==== 1982–1985 ====
Month	1982	1983	1984	1985
January	(Pakistan) Jahangir Khan	(Pakistan) Jahangir Khan	(Pakistan) Jahangir Khan	(Pakistan) Jahangir Khan

==== 1978–1981 ====
Month	1978	1979	1980	1981
January	(Australia) Geoff Hunt	(Australia) Geoff Hunt	(Australia) Geoff Hunt	(Pakistan) Qamar Zaman

==== 1975–1977 ====
Month	1975	1976	1977
January	(Pakistan) Qamar Zaman	(Australia) Geoff Hunt	(Australia) Geoff Hunt

Note:
1) Peter Nicol has represented England since 21 March 2001.

== Year-end top 10 ==
=== 2023-2025 ===
Rank	2023		2024		2025	
1	(Egypt) Ali Farag	22120	(Egypt) Ali Farag	2266	(Egypt) Mostafa Asal	2338
2	(Peru) Diego Elías	15610	(Egypt) Mostafa Asal	2160	(New Zealand) Paul Coll	1499
3	(New Zealand) Paul Coll	13810	(Peru) Diego Elías	1582	(Peru) Diego Elias	1056
4	(Egypt) Mostafa Asal	10305	(New Zealand) Paul Coll	1181	(Egypt) Karim Gawad	1032
5	(England) Mohamed El Shorbagy	10180	(Egypt) Mazen Hesham	905	(Wales) Joel Makin	1013
6	(Egypt) Karim Abdel Gawad	9550	(Wales) Joel Makin	840	(Egypt) Youssef Ibrahim	861
7	(Egypt) Mazen Hesham	8185	(Egypt) Karim Abdel Gawad	755	(England) Marwan El Shorbagy	759
8	(England) Marwan El Shorbagy	8020	(Egypt) Tarek Momen	748	(France) Victor Crouin	758
9	(Egypt) Tarek Momen	7855	(England) Mohamed El Shorbagy	743	(England) Mohamed El Shorbagy	619
10	(Wales) Joel Makin	7535	(Egypt) Youssef Soliman	591	(Egypt) Mohamad Zakaria	553

=== 2020-2022 ===
Rank	2020		2021		2022	
1	(Egypt) Ali Farag	2121	(Egypt) Ali Farag	1911	(Egypt) Ali Farag	1722
2	(Egypt) Mohamed El Shorbagy	1849	(New Zealand) Paul Coll	1558	(Egypt) Mostafa Asal	1567
3	(Egypt) Tarek Momen	1487	(Egypt) Mohamed El Shorbagy	1430	(New Zealand) Paul Coll	1501
4	(New Zealand) Paul Coll	1172	(Egypt) Tarek Momen	1131	(England) Mohamed El Shorbagy	1467
5	(Egypt) Karim Abdel Gawad	1107	(Peru) Diego Elías	1030	(Peru) Diego Elías	1372
6	(Egypt) Marwan El Shorbagy	892	(Egypt) Mostafa Asal	914	(Egypt) Marwan El Shorbagy	851
7	(Peru) Diego Elías	765	(Egypt) Marwan El Shorbagy	800	(Egypt) Tarek Momen	760
8	(Germany) Simon Rösner	653	(Wales) Joel Makin	696	(Egypt) Mazen Hesham	742
9	(Wales) Joel Makin	552	(Egypt) Fares Dessouky	662	(Egypt) Fares Dessouky	713
10	(Colombia) Miguel Ángel Rodríguez	549	(Egypt) Karim Abdel Gawad	522	(France) Victor Crouin	677

=== 2017-2019 ===
Rank	2017		2018		2019	
1	(France) Grégory Gaultier	1651	(Egypt) Mohamed El Shorbagy	1852	(Egypt) Ali Farag	2049
2	(Egypt) Mohamed El Shorbagy	1429	(Egypt) Ali Farag	1477	(Egypt) Mohamed El Shorbagy	1662
3	(Egypt) Ali Farag	1209	(Germany) Simon Rösner	1120	(Egypt) Karim Abdel Gawad	1551
4	(Egypt) Karim Abdel Gawad	1040	(Egypt) Tarek Momen	1011	(Egypt) Tarek Momen	1484
5	(Egypt) Marwan El Shorbagy	761	(Egypt) Marwan El Shorbagy	905	(New Zealand) Paul Coll	1133
6	(England) Nick Matthew	756	(Colombia) Miguel Ángel Rodríguez	813	(Germany) Simon Rösner	735
7	(Egypt) Tarek Momen	724	(New Zealand) Paul Coll	704	(Peru) Diego Elías	713
8	(New Zealand) Paul Coll	608	(France) Grégory Gaultier	681	(Egypt) Karim Abdel Gawad	678
9	(Germany) Simon Rösner	571	(Egypt) Karim Abdel Gawad	595	(Egypt) Marwan El Shorbagy	660
10	(England) James Willstrop	554	(Egypt) Mohamed Abouelghar	545	(Colombia) Miguel Ángel Rodríguez	575

=== 2014-2016 ===
Rank	2014		2015		2016	
1	(Egypt) Mohamed El Shorbagy	1385.000	(France) Grégory Gaultier	1554.500	(Egypt) Mohamed El Shorbagy	2213
2	(France) Grégory Gaultier	1322.000	(Egypt) Mohamed El Shorbagy	1456.000	(Egypt) Karim Abdel Gawad	1380
3	(England) Nick Matthew	970.500	(England) Nick Matthew	1278.000	(France) Grégory Gaultier	997
4	(Egypt) Amr Shabana	878.500	(Egypt) Omar Mosaad	783.500	(England) Nick Matthew	941
5	(Egypt) Ramy Ashour	872.500	(Colombia) Miguel Ángel Rodríguez	709.500	(Egypt) Ramy Ashour	687
6	(England) Peter Barker	573.500	(Egypt) Ramy Ashour	575.000	(Egypt) Marwan El Shorbagy	677
7	(Spain) Borja Golán	570.909	(Germany) Simon Rösner	525.500	(Egypt) Ali Farag	673
8	(England) James Willstrop	532.500	(Egypt) Karim Abdel Gawad	489.500	(Egypt) Omar Mosaad	668
9	(Egypt) Tarek Momen	504.545	(France) Mathieu Castagnet	471.500	(France) Mathieu Castagnet	562
10	(Germany) Simon Rösner	484.091	(Egypt) Tarek Momen	460.500	(Germany) Simon Rösner	554

=== 2011- 2013 ===
Rank	2011		2012		2013	
1	(England) Nick Matthew	1716.750	(England) James Willstrop	1082.500	(Egypt) Ramy Ashour	1675.000
2	(England) James Willstrop	1392.250	(England) Nick Matthew	996.000	(France) Grégory Gaultier	1262.500
3	(France) Grégory Gaultier	1050.750	(France) Grégory Gaultier	995.500	(England) Nick Matthew	1252.000
4	(Egypt) Ramy Ashour	1028.250	(Egypt) Ramy Ashour	894.500	(Egypt) Mohamed El Shorbagy	1030.500
5	(Egypt) Karim Darwish	980.750	(England) Peter Barker	539.000	(England) James Willstrop	991.000
6	(Egypt) Amr Shabana	789.500	(Egypt) Mohamed El Shorbagy	531.000	(Egypt) Karim Darwish	763.000
7	(England) Peter Barker	644.000	(Egypt) Karim Darwish	511.500	(Spain) Borja Golán	572.500
8	(Egypt) Mohamed El Shorbagy	642.875	(Egypt) Omar Mosaad	440.000	(England) Peter Barker	560.000
9	(Australia) David Palmer	485.000	(Egypt) Amr Shabana	415.500	(Egypt) Amr Shabana	532.500
10	(Malaysia) Mohd Azlan Iskandar	465.000	(England) Daryl Selby	415.500	(England) Daryl Selby	484.500

=== 2008–2010 ===
Rank	2008		2009		2010	
1	(Egypt) Amr Shabana	1183.125	(Egypt) Karim Darwish	940.000	(Egypt) Ramy Ashour	1555.000
2	(Egypt) Karim Darwish	926.250	(France) Grégory Gaultier	919.375	(England) Nick Matthew	1224.375
3	(Egypt) Ramy Ashour	900.625	(Egypt) Amr Shabana	916.875	(Egypt) Karim Darwish	983.000
4	(France) Grégory Gaultier	840.000	(England) Nick Matthew	891.250	(France) Grégory Gaultier	718.750
5	(England) James Willstrop	834.375	(Egypt) Ramy Ashour	800.000	(England) James Willstrop	715.000
6	(Australia) David Palmer	653.500	(England) James Willstrop	573.125	(Egypt) Amr Shabana	685.625
7	(France) Thierry Lincou	611.875	(England) Peter Barker	526.000	(France) Thierry Lincou	570.455
8	(Egypt) Wael El Hindi	513.125	(Australia) David Palmer	491.875	(England) Peter Barker	513.000
9	(England) Peter Barker	459.375	(France) Thierry Lincou	443.750	(Netherlands) Laurens Jan Anjema	406.375
10	(England) Nick Matthew	453.750	(Egypt) Wael El Hindi	332.500	(Egypt) Mohamed El Shorbagy	406.250

=== 2005–2007 ===
Rank	2005		2006		2007	
1	(France) Thierry Lincou	872.656	(Egypt) Amr Shabana	1346.528	(Egypt) Amr Shabana	1418.125
2	(England) James Willstrop	726.944	(Australia) David Palmer	1124.306	(Egypt) Ramy Ashour	1039.375
3	(Australia) Anthony Ricketts	702.778	(France) Thierry Lincou	881.250	(France) Grégory Gaultier	833.125
4	(Australia) David Palmer	685.417	(France) Grégory Gaultier	756.818	(Australia) David Palmer	786.875
5	(England) Lee Beachill	672.813	(England) Nick Matthew	530.625	(England) Nick Matthew	666.750
6	(Canada) Jonathon Power	611.806	(Australia) Anthony Ricketts	519.375	(England) James Willstrop	661.250
7	(Egypt) Amr Shabana	587.222	(Egypt) Ramy Ashour	510.833	(France) Thierry Lincou	542.500
8	(England) Peter Nicol	535.417	(England) James Willstrop	496.250	(Egypt) Karim Darwish	503.182
9	(Scotland) John White	376.875	(Egypt) Karim Darwish	437.500	(Egypt) Wael El Hindi	428.409
10	(England) Nick Matthew	357.083	(England) Lee Beachill	425.625	(Scotland) John White	415.000

=== 2002–2004 ===
Rank	2002		2003		2004	
1	(England) Peter Nicol	1253.125	(England) Peter Nicol	791.875	(England) Lee Beachill	858.333
2	(Canada) Jonathon Power	1149.219	(Scotland) John White	760.938	(France) Thierry Lincou	816.667
3	(Australia) David Palmer	729.688	(Australia) David Palmer	685.469	(England) Peter Nicol	673.472
4	(Australia) Stewart Boswell	592.969	(Canada) Jonathon Power	589.375	(Australia) David Palmer	642.969
5	(Scotland) John White	498.125	(France) Thierry Lincou	562.813	(Egypt) Amr Shabana	579.167
6	(France) Thierry Lincou	417.969	(Australia) Anthony Ricketts	430.938	(Scotland) John White	505.625
7	(Australia) Anthony Ricketts	357.031	(Egypt) Karim Darwish	323.438	(England) Nick Matthew	497.750
8	(Malaysia) Ong Beng Hee	323.750	(Malaysia) Ong Beng Hee	287.500	(Egypt) Karim Darwish	462.222
9	(England) Lee Beachill	319.531	(England) Lee Beachill	277.344	(Canada) Jonathon Power	380.750
10	(England) Mark Chaloner	268.750	(France) Grégory Gaultier	253.594	(France) Grégory Gaultier	363.056

=== 1999–2001 ===
Rank	1999		2000		2001	
1	(Canada) Jonathon Power	888.750	(Scotland) Peter Nicol	927.500	(Australia) David Palmer	1009.375
2	(Scotland) Peter Nicol	821.250	(Canada) Jonathon Power	825.278	(England) Peter Nicol	995.833
3	(Egypt) Ahmed Barada	465.156	(England) Simon Parke	488.194	(Canada) Jonathon Power	630.500
4	(England) Paul Johnson	294.688	(Wales) David Evans	374.861	(Scotland) John White	547.656
5	(Australia) Anthony Hill	284.313	(Egypt) Ahmed Barada	368.889	(France) Thierry Lincou	481.250
6	(Scotland) Martin Heath	258.406	(Scotland) Martin Heath	337.778	(Australia) Stewart Boswell	440.972
7	(Belgium) Stefan Casteleyn	244.328	(England) Paul Johnson	322.500	(Malaysia) Ong Beng Hee	396.528
8	(England) Simon Parke	241.094	(Australia) David Palmer	315.139	(England) Mark Chaloner	335.417
9	(Wales) Alex Gough	236.344	(Wales) Alex Gough	235.278	(Australia) Paul Price	327.083
10	(Scotland) John White	195.688	(Australia) Paul Price	232.188	(Wales) David Evans	322.222

=== 1996–1998 ===
Rank	1996	1997	1998
1	(Pakistan) Jansher Khan	(Pakistan) Jansher Khan	(Scotland) Peter Nicol
2	(Australia) Rodney Eyles	(Scotland) Peter Nicol	(Egypt) Ahmed Barada
3	(Scotland) Peter Nicol	(Canada) Jonathon Power	(Canada) Jonathon Power
4	(England) Chris Walker	(Australia) Rodney Eyles	(England) Paul Johnson
5	(Australia) Brett Martin	(England) Simon Parke	(Scotland) Martin Heath
6	(England) Del Harris	(England) Del Harris	(Australia) Dan Jenson
7	(Australia) Craig Rowland	(Egypt) Ahmed Barada	(Australia) Rodney Eyles
8	(England) Mark Chaloner	(Australia) Anthony Hill	(Pakistan) Jansher Khan
9	(Australia) Anthony Hill	(Australia) Brett Martin	(England) Simon Parke
10	(England) Simon Parke	(England) Chris Walker	(Republic of Ireland) Derek Ryan

== Year-end number 1 ==
Years ended No. 1
Player	Count
Jansher Khan	9
Jahangir Khan	7
Ali Farag	6
Geoff Hunt	5
Peter Nicol	4
Amr Shabana	3
Mohamed El Shorbagy	3
Ramy Ashour	2
Qamar Zaman	2
Grégory Gaultier	2
Lee Beachill	1
Karim Darwish	1
Thierry Lincou	1
Nick Matthew	1
David Palmer	1
Jonathon Power	1
James Willstrop	1
Mostafa Asal	1

- 1975: (Pakistan) Qamar Zaman
- 1976: (Australia) Geoff Hunt
- 1977: (Australia) Geoff Hunt (2)
- 1978: (Australia) Geoff Hunt (3)
- 1979: (Australia) Geoff Hunt (4)
- 1980: (Australia) Geoff Hunt (5)
- 1981: (Pakistan) Qamar Zaman
- 1982: (Pakistan) Jahangir Khan
- 1983: (Pakistan) Jahangir Khan (2)
- 1984: (Pakistan) Jahangir Khan (3)
- 1985: (Pakistan) Jahangir Khan (4)
- 1986: (Pakistan) Jahangir Khan (5)
- 1987: (Pakistan) Jahangir Khan (6)
- 1988: (Pakistan) Jahangir Khan (7)
- 1989: (Pakistan) Jansher Khan
- 1990: (Pakistan) Jansher Khan(2)
- 1991: (Pakistan) Jansher Khan (3)
- 1992: (Pakistan) Jansher Khan (4)
- 1993: (Pakistan) Jansher Khan (5)
- 1994: (Pakistan) Jansher Khan (6)
- 1995: (Pakistan) Jansher Khan (7)
- 1996: (Pakistan) Jansher Khan (8)
- 1997: (Pakistan) Jansher Khan (9)
- 1998: (Scotland) Peter Nicol
- 1999: (Canada) Jonathon Power
- 2000: (Scotland) Peter Nicol
- 2001: (Australia) David Palmer
- 2002: (England) Peter Nicol
- 2003: (England) Peter Nicol (2)
- 2004: (England) Lee Beachill
- 2005: (France) Thierry Lincou
- 2006: (Egypt) Amr Shabana
- 2007: (Egypt) Amr Shabana (2)
- 2008: (Egypt) Amr Shabana (3)
- 2009: (Egypt) Karim Darwish
- 2010: (Egypt) Ramy Ashour
- 2011: (England) Nick Matthew
- 2012: (England) James Willstrop
- 2013: (Egypt) Ramy Ashour (2)
- 2014: (Egypt) Mohamed El Shorbagy
- 2015: (France) Grégory Gaultier
- 2016: (Egypt) Mohamed El Shorbagy (2)
- 2017: (France) Grégory Gaultier (2)
- 2018: (Egypt) Mohamed El Shorbagy (3)
- 2019: (Egypt) Ali Farag
- 2020: (Egypt) Ali Farag (2)
- 2021: (Egypt) Ali Farag (3)
- 2022: (Egypt) Ali Farag (4)
- 2023: (Egypt) Ali Farag (5)
- 2024: (Egypt) Ali Farag (6)
- 2025: (Egypt) Mostafa Asal

== See also ==
- PSA Awards
- List of PSA men's number 1 ranked players
- PSA World Tour
- Official Women's Squash World Ranking
- List of PSA women's number 1 ranked players
