= 1991 Men's World Team Squash Championships =

Men's World Team 1991
- 13th World Men's Team Championship
- Location: Finland
- Date: November 12–17, 1991

Results
- Champions: Australia
- Runners-up: England
- Third place: Finland

The 1991 Men's World Team Squash Championships were held in Helsinki, Finland and took place from November 12 until November 17, 1991.

== Seeds ==
1. Australia
2. Pakistan
3. England
4. New Zealand
5. Egypt
6. Finland
7. Sweden
8. Canada

== Results ==
=== Pool A ===
Team one	Team two	Score
Australia	Egypt	2-1
Australia	New Zealand	3-0
Australia	Canada	3-0
Egypt	New Zealand	1-2
Egypt	Canada	2-1
New Zealand	Canada	1-2

Pos	Nation	Team	P	W	L	F	A	Pts
1	Australia	Chris Dittmar, Chris Robertson, Brett Martin, Rodney Eyles	3	3	0	8	1	6
2	Egypt	Ahmed Tahir, Amir Wagih, Gamal El Amir, A Aref	3	1	2	4	5	2
3	New Zealand	Ross Norman, Glen Wilson, Rory Watt, Paul Steel	3	2	2	3	6	2
3	Canada	Jonathon Power, Gary Waite, Jamie Crombie, Gene Turk	3	1	2	3	5	2

=== Pool B ===
Team one	Team two	Score
England	Pakistan	2-1
England	Sweden	3-0
England	Finland	2-1
Finland	Sweden	2-1
Finland	Pakistan	2-1
Pakistan	Sweden	1-2

Pos	Nation	Team	P	W	L	F	A	Pts
1	England	Del Harris, Chris Walker, Peter Marshall, Jason Nicolle	3	3	0	7	2	6
2	Finland	Sami Elopuro, Pentti Pekkanen, Marko Pulli	3	2	1	5	4	4
3	Sweden	Fredrik Johnson, Anders Wahlstedt, Jonas Gornerup, Thomas Falck	3	1	2	3	6	2
4	Pakistan	Jansher Khan, Maqsood Ahmed, Umar Zaman, Ehsanullah Khan	3	0	3	3	6	0

=== Semi-finals ===
Team one	Team two	Score
England	Egypt	3-0
Australia	Finland	3-0

=== Third Place Play Off ===
Team one	Team two	Score
Finland	Egypt	3-0

=== Final ===
Australia
3
FINAL
Helsinki, Finland
17 November 1991

England
0

			1	2	3	4	5
1	(Australia) (England)	Brett Martin; Chris Walker	9; 2	9; 6	9; 2
2	(Australia) (England)	Chris Dittmar; Del Harris	9; 2	9; 2	9; 4
3	(Australia) (England)	Chris Robertson; Peter Marshall	9; 5	9; 3	9; 4

== See also ==
- World Team Squash Championships
- World Squash Federation
- World Open (squash)

Preceded by Singapore; 1989	Squash World Team; Finland; 1991	Succeeded by Pakistan; 1993
