= Squash in Pakistan =

Popular sport in Pakistan

Squash is one of the most popular sports in Pakistan. Pakistan had hosted a number of international tournaments and has many professional training centers around the country. Pakistan reached its peak in the 1980s and 1990s during the reigns of Jahangir Khan and Jansher Khan. Both players won many laurels for the country. Jansher Khan won the World Open eight times and the British Open six times. He was ranked number 1 in the world for six years. Jahangir Khan is easily the greatest professional squash player of all time with an unofficial record of having 555-game winning streak. Between 1950 and 1997, Pakistan amassed over 30 British Open titles, 14 World Open titles and many more PSA professional titles.

== History ==
Hashim Khan was the first Pakistani to dominate the sport. Having been a squash coach in the British Army, when Pakistan gained independence he joined as a coach for the Pakistan Air Force. It was there that he impressed the officers with his skills that they sent him to England to compete out of their own pocket. Despite being in his late forties, Hashim Khan showed great skill and speed and in 1951 competed in the prestigious British Open.

It was there also that he laid the foundation of Pakistani dominance in Squash. Hashim defeated 4 times winner the current champion Mahmoud Karim of Egypt in devastating fashion, 9-5, 9-0, 9-0.

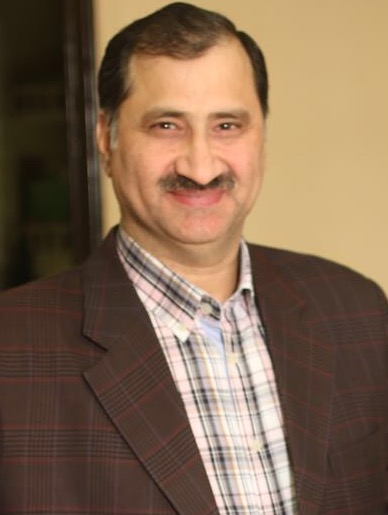
Jansher Khan, Record Eight Times Winner of the Squash World Open, Record Four Times Winners of the World Super Series and Guinness World Records holder is widely considered to be the greatest player in the history of the game.

He went on to win British Open titles, 6 titles over 8 years.

Pakistani control over the World Open, British Open, Hong Kong Open and the Super Series, The names of such great maestros such as Azam Khan, Roshan Khan, Mo Khan, Qamar Zaman, Jahangir Khan, and Jansher Khan have dominated the sport.

However, since 1998, when Jansher Khan was defeated in the British Open final, Pakistan squash has fallen from its height and now no longer is the dominant force in squash. Some believe this is due to a lack of funding for the Pakistan Squash Federation, not enough qualified coaches, and lack of experience playing against international squash players. No Pakistani since has reached the final of either the British or World Open.

== Present ==
Pakistan host a number of international squash tournaments and have many professional training centres around the country. Pakistani squash players still have a big presence in both the men’s and women’s games, but no one player has reached the standards of past players.

Muhammad Naveed Alam has been credited with coaching the next generation of squash players in Pakistan. In November 2025 he was presented with a Best Coach Award by Jahangir Khan.

== See also ==
- Pakistan International
