= Nancarrow =

Nancarrow (or Nancherrow) is a Cornish surname meaning the "valley of the deer". Notable people with the surname include:

- Alexandra Nancarrow (born 1993), Australian tennis player
- Cam Nancarrow (born 1945), Australian squash player
- Conlon Nancarrow (1912–1997), American-Mexican composer
- John Nancarrow; see Last speaker of the Cornish language
- Tristan Nancarrow (born 1964), Australian squash player
