= Pakistan Squash Federation =

Sports governing body in Pakistan

- Sport: Squash
- Abbreviation: PSF
- Founded: 1950
- Affiliation: World Squash
- Regional affiliation: Asian Squash Federation
- Location: Islamabad
- President: Air Marshal Kazim Hammad
- Secretary: Air Commodore (R) Amir Nawaz

Official website
- www.pakistansquash.org
- (Pakistan)

Pakistan Squash Federation (PSF) is the National governing body for Squash in Pakistan. The Federation was formed in 1950.

== Affiliations ==
The Federation is affiliated with:

- World Squash Federation
- Asian Squash Federation
- Pakistan Olympic Association
- Pakistan Sports Board

== See also ==
- Squash in Pakistan
- Pakistan men's national squash team
- Pakistan women's national squash team
