= Nawan kalli =

Pakistani village

Nawan Kalli نواں کلى
- Village
- Nickname: Nawe kale
- Motto: KHAPL KALI
- Location within Pakistan
- Coordinates: 34°9′50.85″N 72°5′3.95″E
- Country: Pakistan
- Province: Khyber Pakhtunkhwa
- Districts of Pakistan: Mardan

Area
  - Total: 28,736,524.2 km^{2} (11,095,234.02 sq mi)
- Elevation: 200 m (660 ft)
- Postal code: 23420
- Area code: 23200

Nawan Kalli (Pashto: نوی کلی), is a part of Toru village and a union council located in the Mardan District of Khyber Pakhtunkhwa. Situated on an altitude of 291 m (958 feet), Toru are also known as Bukhara Sani because they produce many religious scholars. Like (Moulana Abdussalam Sahb) People from Afghanistan and Central Asia come here to seek religious knowledge from these scholars and ulema. The people of Toru are divided into different castes: Sheikhan, Rawani, Zaid khel, Sadi Khel, Malik, Mandoori, Mulyan, Bacha Syed’s, Awan, Bosi Khel etc, among many others. Swat canal is main beauty of nawan kali, Toru. Hamzakot rest house on Main rustam road near 1122 rescue office and GGDC.

== Location ==
Toru is located south of Mardan, surrounded by two perennial nullahs called Kalpani and Balar; which former descends down from the heights of Malakand to the plains of this vast, fertile tract, while the latter flows downstream from the adjacent district of Swabi. Nawan Kali, Toru, District Mardan is next to Ghāgaraī and is located in North-West Frontier Province.

Almost all the people living in this area Nawan Kali emigrated from different regions and parts of Khyber Pakhtunkhwa over time. Only a few Pashtun tribes are originally from the local area, while several non-Pashtun communities also live here. This area is considered part of the greater Toru and Mayar region, and Nawan Khali is a small locality within it.
