= Chris Dittmar =

Australian sports commentator

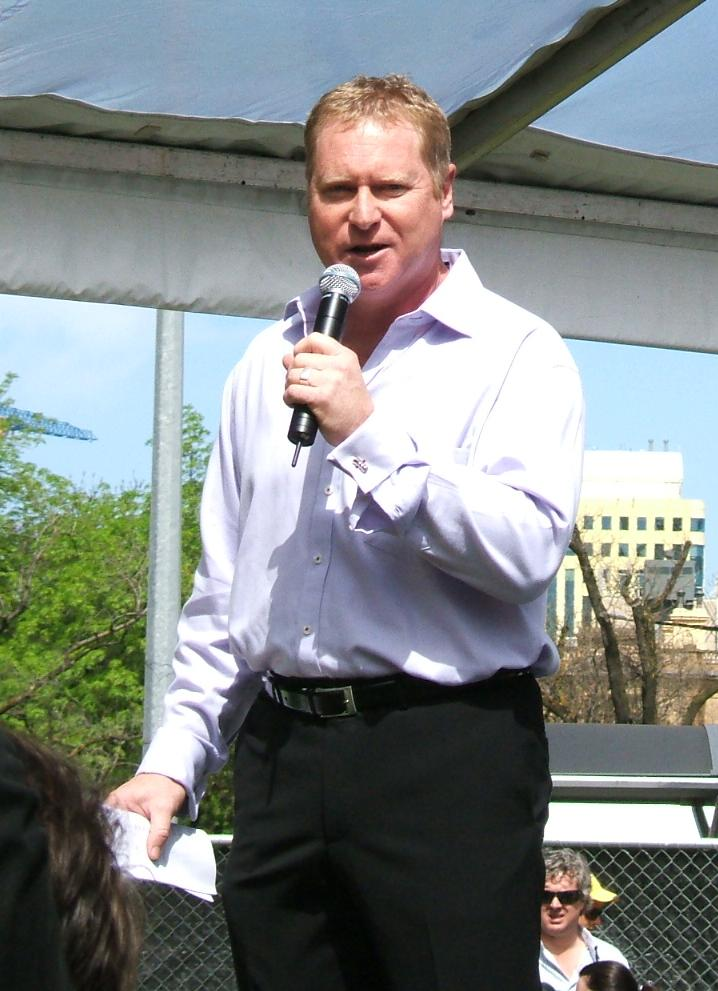

Personal information
- Nationality: Australian
- Born: 16 January 1964 (age 62) Adelaide, Australia

Sport
- Handedness: Left-handed
- Retired: 1993

Men's Singles
- Highest ranking: 1 (July 1993)
- World Open: F (1983, 1987, 1989, 1990, 1992)
Medal record
Men's squash
Representing Australia
World Championships
Silver medal – second place	1983 Munich	Singles
Silver medal – second place	1987 Birmingham	Singles
Silver medal – second place	1989 Kuala Lumpur	Singles
Silver medal – second place	1990 Toulouse	Singles
Silver medal – second place	1992 Johannesburg	Singles
Bronze medal – third place	1986 Toulouse	Singles
Bronze medal – third place	1988 Amsterdam	Singles
Bronze medal – third place	1991 Adelaide	Singles

Christopher Simon Dittmar (born 16 January 1964) is an Australian sports commentator who was formerly the World No. 1-ranked men's squash player.

Dittmar is widely considered to be the "best player never to have won" one of squash's two biggest titles. He finished runner-up at the World Open five times – in 1983, 1987, 1989, 1990 and 1992 – and was runner-up at the British Open twice – in 1985 and 1993.

== Biography ==
Dittmar was born in Adelaide, South Australia, attended St Michael's College, Adelaide and was a contemporary of two great Pakistani players – Jahangir Khan and Jansher Khan. Dittmar provided probably the most consistent challenge of any player to the dominance of these two greats during the 1980s and early 1990s, but never quite managed to break their iron grip on the game. In all seven of the World Open and British Open finals he played in, Dittmar lost to one of the two Khans. There were several occasions in his career when Dittmar managed to beat one of the Khans in a semi-final round, only to lose to the other in the final. Dittmar won what is remembered as one of the sport's classic matches against Jahangir Khan in the semi-finals of the 1989 World Open in Kuala Lumpur, taking the fifth set 15–13. The following day in the final, he took a two set lead against Jansher, but tired as the long match wore on and eventually lost in five sets.

Dittmar has claimed that the proudest moment of his career came in captaining the Australian team to victory in World Team Squash Championships in 1989. Australia beat Pakistan 3–0 in the final, with Dittmar contributing a win over Jahangir Khan. Two years later in 1991, Dittmar captained the Australian team which successfully defended the title.

Prior to turning professional, Dittmar was runner-up at the World Junior Championships in both 1980 and 1982, and won the British Open Junior Championship in 1981. He won several professional titles, including three Australian Opens, three Canadian Opens, three European Opens, three New Zealand Opens, and two South African Opens. His consistency helped him briefly capture the World No. 1 ranking shortly before he retired as a player in 1993. He was ranked No. 2 and No. 3 for much longer periods.

Dittmar was known for being very forthright in expressing his views as a player during his career, and represented his fellow players as President of the International Squash Players Association for several years. He also served as Patron of Squash Australia from 2002 to 2005. He was inducted into the Squash Australia Hall of Fame in 2005.

Since retiring as a squash player, Dittmar has worked as a television sports commentator in Australia for Channel Seven. He has also worked for Adelaide radio stations FIVEaa and Triple M. He hosted FIVEaa's soccer show on Sunday evenings for a period, and currently hosts 'Roo and Ditts for Breakfast' on Triple M with Mark Ricciuto. He has also been an Australian rules football commentator for both stations.

Dittmar suffered a small brain haemorrhage requiring hospitalisation in July 2009.

== Family ==
Dittmar comes from a well-known sports family in Adelaide. His father played Australian rules football for the Port Adelaide Football Club. His uncle Wally also played for Port Adelaide and represented South Australia in State of Origin football. Furthermore, his uncle Len was crowned the Australian welterweight boxing champion in the 1950s.

Sporting positions
Preceded by Jansher Khan	World No. 1 July 1993 - August 1993	Succeeded by Jansher Khan
