= Paul Price (squash player) =

Australian squash player (born 1976)

Personal information
- Born: 6 May 1976 (age 50) Melbourne
- Height: 1.83 m (6 ft 0 in)

Sport
- Country: Australia
- Handedness: Right-Handed
- Racquet used: Grays
- Highest ranking: 4 (August 2001)
Medal record
Men's squash
Representing Australia
Commonwealth Games
Bronze medal – third place	2002 Manchester	Doubles

Paul Price (born 6 May 1976 in Melbourne, Victoria) is an Australian squash player. He finished runner-up at the British Open in 2000, and reached a career-high world ranking of World No. 4 in August 2001.
