= Rodney Martin (squash player) =

Australian squash player (born 1965)

Personal information
- Born: 17 October 1965 (age 60)
- Website: rodmartinsquash.com

Sport
- Country: Australia
- Handedness: Right-Handed
- Turned pro: 1984
- Retired: 1995

Men's Singles
- Highest ranking: 2 (November 1992)
- World Open: W (1991)
Medal record
Men's squash
Representing Australia
World Championships
Gold medal – first place	1991 Adelaide	Singles
Bronze medal – third place	1987 Birmingham	Singles
Bronze medal – third place	1992 Johannesburg	Singles
- Updated on 20 December 2011

Rodney Martin (born 17 October 1965) is an Australian former professional squash player, who is best known for winning the 1991 World Open and becoming the first player to defeat Jahangir Khan and Jansher Khan in the same event. After retiring as a player due to injury, he became a squash coach, working in Australia and the United States.

== Early life ==
Martin comes from one of squash's most successful families. His older brother Brett Martin and younger sister Michelle Martin were also top professional players. He grew up in the Sydney suburb of Engadine, where his parents built the local squash centre under their family home. In his early teens he moved with his family to Brisbane, where he attended Everton Park State High School.

== Career ==
Martin began his squash career in 1984 and shortly afterwards began attending the Australian Institute of Sport. His first major victory at an international competition was at the 1985 Australian Open. Martin was runner-up at the British Open three times in 1988–1990 (losing to Pakistani player Jahangir Khan in the final on all three occasions).

He is best known for winning the World Open in 1991, beating Jahangir Khan in the final 14–17, 15–9, 15–4, 15–13 (he had previously beaten another Pakistani player, Jansher Khan, in the quarter-finals, and his Australian compatriot Chris Dittmar in the semi-finals). He became the first person to defeat Jahangir and Jansher Khan in the same event. Martin also won the Australian Open in 1986, 1990, 1992, and 1993, the Hong Kong Open in 1986 and 1992, and the United States Open in 1989 and 1991; he was part of the Australian teams that won the World Team Squash Championships in 1989 in Singapore and 1991 in Helsinki. Martin was forced to retire from the international tour in 1995 due to a hip injury.

After retiring as a player, he became a squash coach, working with the Australian Institute of Sport from 1996 to 2010 and then setting up his own business in the US state of Connecticut, Rodney Martin Squash. In Australia he coached such players as his sister Michelle, Stewart Boswell, Anthony Ricketts, Paul Price, Dan Jenson, Cameron Pilley, and Kasey Brown. Some of the players he has coached since moving to the US include Mohamed El Shorbagy, Ryan Cuskelly, Zac Alexander, Abdulla Al-Tamimi, Peter Creed, Chris Hanson, and Christopher Binnie.

== Personal life ==
In 1993, Martin married fellow Australian squash player Danielle Drady, with whom he had been in a long-term relationship, but their marriage ended the next year after she left him for his manager Phil Harte (who had also managed Martin's sister Michelle). Martin later partially won a court case in the Supreme Court of New South Wales against Harte and two other directors over their management of the Australian Squash Club.

He is married to retired Australian international squash player Amelia Pittock and they have a son.

== Recognition ==
Martin received an Australian Sports Medal in 2000 and was inducted into the Squash Australia Hall of Fame in 2007.
