= World Squash Championships =

Squash world championship

World Squash Championship

Details
- Event name: World Championship
- Website; World Squash

Winners
- Men's: (Egypt) Mostafa Asal
- Women's: (Egypt) Amina Orfi

The World Squash Championships are squash events, which since the early 1990s have been held annually for both men and women organised by the Professional Squash Association. The men's event was first held in 1976 in London, England and the women's was inaugurated in 1976 in Brisbane, Australia.

== History ==
The British Open had for many years been generally considered to be the sport's effective world championship, and this continued to be the case until the World Open (called World Championship since 2017) was established.

The women's World Championship was held once every two years until the early 1990s, when it became an annual event. The men's event has been held every year since 1976, except for a two-year gap in 2000 and 2001 when it was not held due primarily to difficulties in securing sponsorship. In recent years, the men's World Championship has been part of the PSA World Series.

- 1922 - 1975 : British Open Squash Championships (Unofficial World Championships)
- 1976 - 2016 : World Open
- 2017 : World Championships
- World Amateur Championship (Men / Women):
1. Aug 1967 Sydney, Australia
2. Feb 1969 London, England (Jonah Barrington (squash player))
3. Aug 1971 Hamilton, New Zealand
4. Sep 1973 Durban, South Africa
5. May 1976 London, England
6. Sep 1977 Toronto, Canada
7. Oct 1979 Melbourne, Australia

ISRF World Amateur and Individual Squash Championships. Squash went Open in 1980. Before 1980 World Team Championships and their accompanying Individual events were played by amateurs.

== Editions & results ==
=== Men ===
Source: World Squash

Year	Location	Champion	Runner-up	Score	Semifinalists
1976	(England) London	(Australia) Geoff Hunt	(Pakistan) Mohibullah Khan	7–9, 9–4, 8–10, 9–2, 9–2	(Pakistan) Qamar Zaman (Pakistan) Gogi Alauddin
1977	(Australia) Adelaide	(Australia) Geoff Hunt	(Pakistan) Qamar Zaman	9–5, 10–9, 0–9, 9–4	(Pakistan) Mohibullah Khan (Pakistan) Gogi Alauddin
1978	No competition
1979	(Canada) Toronto	(Australia) Geoff Hunt	(Pakistan) Qamar Zaman	9–2, 9–3, 9–2	(Pakistan) Mohibullah Khan (Pakistan) Maqsood Ahmed
1980	(Australia) Adelaide	(Australia) Geoff Hunt	(Pakistan) Qamar Zaman	9–0, 9–3, 9–3	(Pakistan) Mohibullah Khan (Pakistan) Hiddy Jahan
1981	(Canada) Toronto	(Pakistan) Jahangir Khan	(Australia) Geoff Hunt	7–9, 9–1, 9–2, 9–2	(Pakistan) Qamar Zaman (Pakistan) Hiddy Jahan
1982	(England) Birmingham	(Pakistan) Jahangir Khan	(Australia) Dean Williams	9–2, 6–9, 9–1, 9–1	(Pakistan) Hiddy Jahan (Australia) Glen Brumby
1983	(West Germany) Munich	(Pakistan) Jahangir Khan	(Australia) Chris Dittmar	9–3, 9–6, 9–0	(New Zealand) Stuart Davenport (Egypt) Gamal Awad
1984	(Pakistan) Karachi	(Pakistan) Jahangir Khan	(Pakistan) Qamar Zaman	9–0, 9–3, 9–4	(Pakistan) Maqsood Ahmed (New Zealand) Ross Norman
1985	(Egypt) Cairo	(Pakistan) Jahangir Khan	(New Zealand) Ross Norman	9–4, 4–9, 9–5, 9–1	(Australia) Glen Brumby (England) Gawain Briars
1986	(France) Toulouse	(New Zealand) Ross Norman	(Pakistan) Jahangir Khan	9–5, 9–7, 7–9, 9–1	(Australia) Chris Dittmar (Australia) Chris Robertson
1987	(England) Birmingham	(Pakistan) Jansher Khan	(Australia) Chris Dittmar	9–5, 9–4, 4–9, 9–6	(Australia) Rodney Martin (Pakistan) Jahangir Khan
1988	(Netherlands) Amsterdam	(Pakistan) Jahangir Khan	(Pakistan) Jansher Khan	9–6, 9–2, 9–2	(Australia) Chris Dittmar (New Zealand) Ross Norman
1989	(Malaysia) Kuala Lumpur	(Pakistan) Jansher Khan	(Australia) Chris Dittmar	7–15, 6–15, 15–4, 15–11, 15–10	(Australia) Chris Robertson (Pakistan) Jahangir Khan
1990	(France) Toulouse	(Pakistan) Jansher Khan	(Australia) Chris Dittmar	15–8, 17–15, 13–15, 15–5	(Australia) Chris Robertson (Australia) Tristan Nancarrow
1991	(Australia) Adelaide	(Australia) Rodney Martin	(Pakistan) Jahangir Khan	14–17, 15–9, 15–4, 15–13	(Australia) Chris Dittmar (Australia) Chris Robertson
1992	(South Africa) Johannesburg	(Pakistan) Jansher Khan	(Australia) Chris Dittmar	15–11, 15–9, 10–15, 15–6	(England) Rodney Martin (Spain) Austin Adarraga
1993	(Pakistan) Karachi	(Pakistan) Jansher Khan	(Pakistan) Jahangir Khan	14–15, 15–9, 15–5, 15–5	(England) Peter Marshall (England) Chris Walker
1994	(Spain) Barcelona	(Pakistan) Jansher Khan	(England) Peter Marshall	10–15, 15–11, 15–8, 15–4	(Scotland) Peter Nicol (Australia) Rodney Eyles
1995	(Cyprus) Nicosia	(Pakistan) Jansher Khan	(England) Del Harris	15–10, 17–14, 16–17, 15–8	(Australia) Anthony Hill (Australia) Craig Rowland
1996	(Pakistan) Karachi	(Pakistan) Jansher Khan	(Australia) Rodney Eyles	15–13, 17–15, 11–15, 15–3	(Scotland) Peter Nicol (England) Chris Walker
1997	(Malaysia) Petaling Jaya	(Australia) Rodney Eyles	(Scotland) Peter Nicol	15–11, 15–12, 15–12	(Wales) Alex Gough (England) Peter Marshall
1998	(Qatar) Doha	(Canada) Jonathon Power	(Scotland) Peter Nicol	15–17, 15–7, 15–9, 15–10	(Australia) Anthony Hill (Belgium) Stefan Casteleyn
1999	(Egypt) Cairo	(Scotland) Peter Nicol	(Egypt) Ahmed Barada	15–9, 15–13, 15–11	(Canada) Jonathon Power (Scotland) Martin Heath
2000	No competition
2001	No competition
2002	(Belgium) Antwerp	(Australia) David Palmer	(Scotland) John White	13–15, 12–15, 15–6, 15–14, 15–11	(England) Peter Nicol (Canada) Jonathon Power
2003	(Pakistan) Lahore	(Egypt) Amr Shabana	(France) Thierry Lincou	15–14, 9–15, 15–11, 15–7	(Australia) Joseph Kneipp (Egypt) Karim Darwish
2004	(Qatar) Doha	(France) Thierry Lincou	(England) Lee Beachill	5–11, 11–2, 2–11, 12–10, 11–8	(Australia) David Palmer (Canada) Graham Ryding
2005	Hong Kong	(Egypt) Amr Shabana	(Australia) David Palmer	11–6, 11–7, 11–8	(England) Peter Nicol (England) James Willstrop
2006	(Egypt) Cairo	(Australia) David Palmer	(France) Grégory Gaultier	9–11, 9–11, 11–9, 16–14, 11–2	(Egypt) Amr Shabana (France) Thierry Lincou
2007	(Bermuda) Hamilton	(Egypt) Amr Shabana	(France) Grégory Gaultier	11–7, 11–4, 11–6	(Australia) David Palmer (England) Nick Matthew
2008	(England) Manchester	(Egypt) Ramy Ashour	(Egypt) Karim Darwish	5–11, 11–8, 11–4, 11–5	(Australia) David Palmer (Egypt) Amr Shabana
2009	Kuwait	(Egypt) Amr Shabana	(Egypt) Ramy Ashour	11–8, 11–5, 11–5	(France) Grégory Gaultier (England) James Willstrop
2010	(Saudi Arabia) Al-Khobar	(England) Nick Matthew	(England) James Willstrop	8–11, 11–6, 11–2, 11–3	(Egypt) Amr Shabana (England) Peter Barker
2011	(Netherlands) Rotterdam	(England) Nick Matthew	(France) Grégory Gaultier	6–11, 11–9, 11–6, 11–5	(Egypt) Karim Darwish (England) James Willstrop
2012	(Qatar) Doha	(Egypt) Ramy Ashour	(Egypt) Mohamed El Shorbagy	2–11, 11–6, 11–5, 9–11, 11–8	(England) James Willstrop (England) Nick Matthew
2013	(England) Manchester	(England) Nick Matthew	(France) Grégory Gaultier	11–9, 11–9, 11–13, 7–11, 11–2	(Egypt) Ramy Ashour (Egypt) Mohamed El Shorbagy
2014	(Qatar) Doha	(Egypt) Ramy Ashour	(Egypt) Mohamed El Shorbagy	13–11, 7–11, 5–11, 11–5, 14–12	(France) Grégory Gaultier (England) Nick Matthew
2015	(United States) Bellevue	(France) Grégory Gaultier	(Egypt) Omar Mosaad	11–6, 11–7, 12–10	(England) James Willstrop (Egypt) Tarek Momen
2016	(Egypt) Cairo	(Egypt) Karim Abdel Gawad	(Egypt) Ramy Ashour	5–11, 11–6, 11–7, 2–1 (retired)	(Egypt) Mohamed El Shorbagy (France) Grégory Gaultier
2017	(England) Manchester	(Egypt) Mohamed El Shorbagy	(Egypt) Marwan El Shorbagy	11–5, 9–11, 11–7, 9–11, 11–6	(France) Grégory Gaultier (Egypt) Ali Farag
2018–19	(United States) Chicago	(Egypt) Ali Farag	(Egypt) Tarek Momen	11–5, 11–13, 13–11, 11–3	(Egypt) Mohamed El Shorbagy (Germany) Simon Rösner
2019–20	(Qatar) Doha	(Egypt) Tarek Momen	(New Zealand) Paul Coll	11–8, 11–3, 11–4	(Germany) Simon Rösner (Egypt) Marwan El Shorbagy
2020–21	(United States) Chicago	(Egypt) Ali Farag	(Egypt) Mohamed El Shorbagy	7–11, 12–10, 11–9, 11–4	(Egypt) Tarek Momen (New Zealand) Paul Coll
2022	(Egypt) Cairo	(Egypt) Ali Farag	(Egypt) Mohamed El Shorbagy	9–11, 11–8, 7–11, 11–9, 11–2	(Egypt) Mostafa Asal (New Zealand) Paul Coll
2023	(United States) Chicago	(Egypt) Ali Farag	(Egypt) Karim Abdel Gawad	12–10, 11-6, 11–6	(Egypt) Mostafa Asal (England) Mohamed El Shorbagy
2024	(Egypt) Cairo	(Peru) Diego Elías	(Egypt) Mostafa Asal	11–6, 11–5, 12–10	(Egypt) Ali Farag (New Zealand) Paul Coll
2025	(United States) Chicago	(Egypt) Mostafa Asal	(Egypt) Ali Farag	11-7, 11-8, 11-3	(Peru) Diego Elías (New Zealand) Paul Coll
2026	(Egypt) Cairo	(Egypt) Mostafa Asal	(Egypt) Youssef Ibrahim	11-4, 11-1, 12-10	(Egypt) Karim Gawad (Peru) Diego Elías

Note:

- Peter Nicol switched nationality in 2001.
- Mohamed El Shorbagy switched nationality by end of 2022.
- Marwan El Shorbagy switched nationality at on the 30 July 23

=== Women ===
Source: World Squash

Year	Location	Champion	Runner-up	Score	Semifinalists
1976	(Australia) Brisbane	(Australia) Heather McKay	(Australia) Marion Jackman	9-2, 9-2, 9-0	(Australia) Margaret Zachariah (Australia) Sue Newman
1979	(England) Sheffield	(Australia) Heather McKay	(England) Sue Cogswell	6–9, 9–3, 9–1, 9–4	(England) Angela Smith (Australia) Vicki Hoffman
1980	No competition
1981	(Canada) Toronto	(Australia) Rhonda Thorne	(Australia) Vicki Cardwell	8–10, 9–4, 9–5, 7–9, 9–7	(England) Angela Smith (England) Lisa Opie
1982	No competition
1983	(Australia) Perth	(Australia) Vicki Cardwell	(Australia) Rhonda Thorne	9–1, 9–3, 9–4	(New Zealand) Susan Devoy (Australia) Carin Clonda
1984	No competition
1985	(Republic of Ireland) Dublin	(New Zealand) Susan Devoy	(England) Lisa Opie	9–4, 9–5, 10–8	(England) Martine Le Moignan (England) Lucy Soutter
1986	No competition
1987	(New Zealand) Auckland	(New Zealand) Susan Devoy	(England) Lisa Opie	9–3, 10–8, 9–2	(Australia) Liz Irving (Australia) Vicki Cardwell
1988	No competition
1989	(Netherlands) Warmond	(England) Martine Le Moignan	(New Zealand) Susan Devoy	4–9, 9–4, 10–8, 10–8	(Australia) Liz Irving (Australia) Sarah Fitz-Gerald
1990	(Australia) Sydney	(New Zealand) Susan Devoy	(England) Martine Le Moignan	9–4, 9–4, 9–4	(Australia) Danielle Drady (Australia) Robyn Lambourne
1991	No competition
1992	(Canada) Vancouver	(New Zealand) Susan Devoy	(Australia) Michelle Martin	9–4, 9–6, 9–4	(England) Martine Le Moignan (England) Cassie Jackman
1993	(South Africa) Johannesburg	(Australia) Michelle Martin	(Australia) Liz Irving	9–2, 9–2, 9–1	(England) Martine Le Moignan (Germany) Sabine Schoene
1994	(Guernsey) Saint Peter Port	(Australia) Michelle Martin	(England) Cassie Jackman	9–1, 9–0, 9–6	(England) Suzanne Horner (England) Fiona Geaves
1995	Hong Kong	(Australia) Michelle Martin	(Australia) Sarah Fitz-Gerald	8–10, 9–2, 9–6, 9–3	(England) Cassie Jackman (England) Fiona Geaves
1996	(Malaysia) Petaling Jaya	(Australia) Sarah Fitz-Gerald	(England) Cassie Jackman	9–0, 9–3, 9–4	(England) Sue Wright (Australia) Liz Irving
1997	(Australia) Sydney	(Australia) Sarah Fitz-Gerald	(Australia) Michelle Martin	9–5, 5–9, 6–9, 9–2, 9–3	(England) Sue Wright (Australia) Carol Owens
1998	(Germany) Stuttgart	(Australia) Sarah Fitz-Gerald	(Australia) Michelle Martin	10–8, 9–7, 2–9, 3–9, 10–9	(England) Sue Wright (England) Suzanne Horner
1999	(United States) Seattle	(England) Cassie Campion	(Australia) Michelle Martin	9–6, 9–7, 9–7	(New Zealand) Leilani Joyce (England) Natalie Grainger
2000	(Scotland) Edinburgh	(Australia) Carol Owens	(New Zealand) Leilani Joyce	7–9, 3–9, 10–8, 9–6, 9–1	(England) Natalie Grainger (Australia) Sarah Fitzgerald
2001	(Australia) Melbourne	(Australia) Sarah Fitz-Gerald	(New Zealand) Leilani Joyce	9–0, 9–3, 9–2	(New Zealand) Carol Owens (England) Linda Charman-Smith
2002	(Qatar) Doha	(Australia) Sarah Fitz-Gerald	(England) Natalie Pohrer	10–8, 9–3, 7–9, 9–7	(New Zealand) Carol Owens (England) Linda Charman
2003	Hong Kong	(New Zealand) Carol Owens	(England) Cassie Jackman	3–9, 9–2, 9–7, 9–3	(Netherlands) Vanessa Atkinson (Malaysia) Nicol David
2004	(Malaysia) Kuala Lumpur	(Netherlands) Vanessa Atkinson	(Australia) Natalie Grinham	9–1, 9–1, 9–5	(Malaysia) Nicol David (Australia) Rachael Grinham
2005	Hong Kong	(Malaysia) Nicol David	(Australia) Rachael Grinham	8–10, 9–2, 9–6, 9–7	(Netherlands) Vanessa Atkinson (Australia) Natalie Grinham
2006	(Northern Ireland) Belfast	(Malaysia) Nicol David	(Australia) Natalie Grinham	1–9, 9–7, 3–9, 9–5, 9–2	(Australia) Rachael Grinham (United States) Natalie Grainger
2007	(Spain) Madrid	(Australia) Rachael Grinham	(Australia) Natalie Grinham	9–4, 10–8, 9–2	(United States) Natalie Grainger (England) Tania Bailey
2008	(England) Manchester	(Malaysia) Nicol David	(England) Vicky Botwright	5–11, 11–1, 11–6, 11–9	(Republic of Ireland) Madeline Perry (England) Jenny Duncalf
2009	(Netherlands) Amsterdam	(Malaysia) Nicol David	(Netherlands) Natalie Grinham	3–11, 11–6, 11–3, 11–8	(Australia) Rachael Grinham (England) Alison Waters
2010	(Egypt) Sharm El Sheikh	(Malaysia) Nicol David	(Egypt) Omneya Abdel Kawy	11–5, 11–8, 11–6	(England) Alison Waters (France) Camille Serme
2011	(Netherlands) Rotterdam	(Malaysia) Nicol David	(England) Jenny Duncalf	11–2, 11–5, 11–0	(Netherlands) Natalie Grinham (Mexico) Samantha Terán
2012	Cayman Islands	(Malaysia) Nicol David	(England) Laura Massaro	11–6, 11–8, 11–6	(Egypt) Raneem El Weleily (England) Jenny Duncalf
2013	(Malaysia) Penang	(England) Laura Massaro	(Egypt) Nour El Sherbini	11–7, 6–11, 11–9, 5–11, 11–9	(Malaysia) Nicol David (Egypt) Raneem El Weleily
2014	(Egypt) Cairo	(Malaysia) Nicol David	(Egypt) Raneem El Weleily	5–11, 11–8, 7–11, 14–12, 11–5	(England) Alison Waters (Egypt) Omneya Abdel Kawy
2015	(Malaysia) Kuala Lumpur	(Egypt) Nour El Sherbini	(England) Laura Massaro	6–11, 4–11, 11–3, 11–5, 11–8	(Egypt) Raneem El Weleily (Egypt) Nouran Gohar
2016	(Egypt) El Gouna	(Egypt) Nour El Sherbini	(Egypt) Raneem El Weleily	11–8, 11–9, 11–9	(France) Camille Serme (Egypt) Nouran Gohar
2017	(England) Manchester	(Egypt) Raneem El Weleily	(Egypt) Nour El Sherbini	3–11, 12–10, 11–7, 11–5	(France) Camille Serme (Egypt) Nour El Tayeb
2018–19	(United States) Chicago	(Egypt) Nour El Sherbini	(Egypt) Nour El Tayeb	11–6, 11–5, 10–12, 15–13	(Egypt) Raneem El Weleily (France) Camille Serme
2019–20	(Egypt) Cairo	(Egypt) Nour El Sherbini	(Egypt) Raneem El Weleily	11–4, 9–11, 11–5, 11–6	(Egypt) Nouran Gohar (Egypt) Hania El Hammamy
2020–21	(United States) Chicago	(Egypt) Nour El Sherbini	(Egypt) Nouran Gohar	11–5, 11–8, 8–11, 11–9	(France) Camille Serme (United States) Amanda Sobhy
2022	(Egypt) Cairo	(Egypt) Nour El Sherbini	(Egypt) Nouran Gohar	7–11, 11–7, 11–8, 11–7	(Egypt) Nour El Tayeb (United States) Amanda Sobhy
2023	(United States) Chicago	(Egypt) Nour El Sherbini	(Egypt) Nouran Gohar	11–6, 11–4, 12–10	(Egypt) Hania El Hammamy (New Zealand) Joelle King
2024	(Egypt) Cairo	(Egypt) Nouran Gohar	(Egypt) Nour El Sherbini	11–8, 9–11, 11–7, 11–5	(United States) Olivia Weaver (Egypt) Hania El Hammamy
2025	(United States) Chicago	(Egypt) Nour El Sherbini	(Egypt) Hania El Hammamy	11-5, 11-9, 4-11, 11-7	(Egypt) Nouran Gohar (United States) Olivia Weaver
2026	(Egypt) Cairo	(Egypt) Amina Orfi	(Egypt) Nour El Sherbini	6-11, 11-6, 11-6, 7-11, 14-12	(Egypt) Hania El Hammamy (United States) Olivia Weaver

Note:

- Vicki Hoffman was known as Vicki Cardwell from 1982
- Cassie Jackman was also known as Cassie Campion
- Carol Owens switched nationality in 2001.
- Natalie Pohrer was later known as Natalie Grainger.
- Natalie Grinham represented Netherlands from 2007 onwards.
- The 2013 edition was postponed until March 2014.
- The 2015 edition was postponed until April 2016.
- The 2016 edition was held in April 2017.

== Most finals & titles ==
=== Men ===
Rank	Country	Player	Titles	Finals
1	(Pakistan)	Jansher Khan	8	9
2	(Pakistan)	Jahangir Khan	6	9
3	(Australia)	Geoff Hunt	4	5
3	(Egypt)	Ali Farag	4	5
5	(Egypt)	Amr Shabana	4	4
6	(Egypt)	Ramy Ashour	3	5
7	(England)	Nick Matthew	3	3
8	(Egypt)	Mostafa Asal	2	3

=== Women ===
Rank	Country	Player	Titles	Finals
1	(Egypt)	Nour El Sherbini	8	12
2	(Malaysia)	Nicol David	8	8
3	(Australia)	Sarah Fitz-Gerald	5	6
4	(New Zealand)	Susan Devoy	4	5
5	(Australia)	Michelle Martin	3	7

== Medal table ==
=== Men ===
Rank	Nation	Gold	Silver	Bronze	Total
1	Egypt	16	15	18	49
2	Pakistan	14	9	14	37
3	Australia	8	9	19	36
4	England	3	4	18	25
5	France	2	5	5	12
6	Scotland	1	3	3	7
7	New Zealand	1	2	7	10
8	Canada	1	0	3	4
9	Peru	1	0	2	3
10	Germany	0	0	2	2
11	Belgium	0	0	1	1
11	Spain	0	0	1	1
11	Wales	0	0	1	1
Totals (13 entries)		47	47	94	188

=== Women ===
Rank	Nation	Gold	Silver	Bronze	Total
1	Australia	14	13	17	44
2	Egypt	11	13	15	39
3	Malaysia	8	0	3	11
4	New Zealand	5	3	5	13
5	England	3	12	26	41
6	Netherlands	1	1	3	5
7	United States	0	0	7	7
8	France	0	0	5	5
9	Germany	0	0	1	1
9	Ireland	0	0	1	1
9	Mexico	0	0	1	1
Totals (11 entries)		42	42	84	168

== See also ==
- World Squash Doubles Championships
- World Squash Team Championships
- British Open Squash Championships
- Squash World Cup
