= Jahangir Khan =

Retired Pakistani squash player

Jahangir Khan PP HI NI
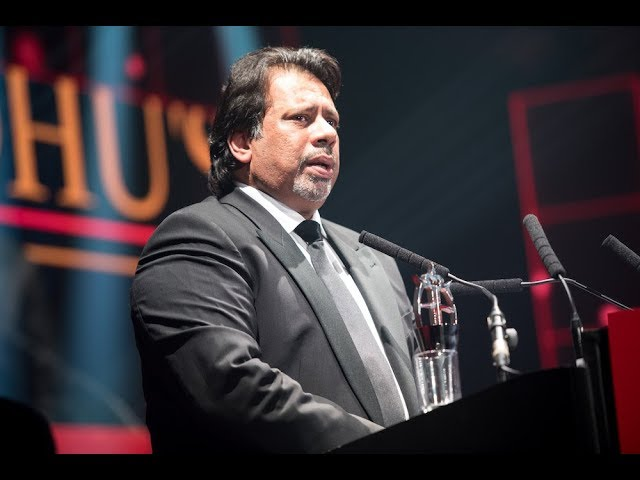
- Jahangir Khan at the 2018 Asian Awards

Personal information
- Nickname: JK
- Born: 10 December 1963 (age 62) Karachi, Sindh, Pakistan
- Height: 1.69 m (5 ft 7 in)

Sport
- Country: Pakistan
- Retired: 1993
- Racquet used: Unsquashable

Men's singles
- Highest ranking: No. 1
- World Open: W (1981, 1982, 1983, 1984, 1985, 1988)
Medal record
Men's squash
Representing Pakistan
World Championships
Gold medal – first place	1988 Amsterdam	Singles
Gold medal – first place	1985 Cairo	Singles
Gold medal – first place	1984 Karachi	Singles
Gold medal – first place	1983 Munich	Singles
Gold medal – first place	1982 Birmingham	Singles
Gold medal – first place	1981 Toronto	Singles
Silver medal – second place	1993 Karachi	Singles
Silver medal – second place	1991 Adelaide	Singles
Silver medal – second place	1986 Toulouse	Singles
Bronze medal – third place	1989 Kuala Lumpur	Singles
Bronze medal – third place	1987 Birmingham	Singles
World Amateur Squash Championship
Gold medal – first place	1979 Melbourne	Singles
Gold medal – first place	1983 Auckland	Singles

1st Emeritus President of the World Squash Federation
- Incumbent
- Assumed office 2008
- Preceded by: Post created

7th President of the World Squash Federation
- In office 2002–2008
- Preceded by: (New Zealand) Susie Simcock
- Succeeded by: (India) Narayana Ramachandran

Jahangir Khan PP HI NI (Pashto, Urdu: جهانګير خان born 10 December 1963) is a Pakistani former professional squash player. He won the World Open title six times, and the British Open title ten times (1982–1991). He is widely regarded as the greatest squash player of all time, and the greatest sportsman in Pakistan history. From 1981 to 1986, Khan was unbeaten and won 555 consecutive matches during that time – the longest winning streak by any athlete in top-level professional sport as recorded by Guinness World Records.

He retired as a player in 1993, and served as President of the World Squash from 2002 to 2008. Later in 2008, he became Emeritus President of the World Squash.

== Early and personal life ==
Khan was born on 10 December 1963 in Karachi. His family originally hailed from Nawan Kalli, a small village near Peshawar in Pakistan.

A member of the Khan family, he was born into a family of squash players; his father Roshan Khan won the British Open title in 1957, and his older brother was Torsam Khan.

Two of his nieces are Natasha Khan (better known as Bat for Lashes), a British singer, and Maria Khan, a professional footballer who has played for the Pakistan women's football team.

== Career ==
Khan was coached initially by his father Roshan, the 1957 British Open champion, then by his brother Torsam. After his brother's sudden death he was coached by his cousin Rehmat, who guided Khan through most of his career.

In 1979, the Pakistan selectors decided not to select Khan to play in the world championships in Australia but he entered the World Amateur Individual Championship, at the age of 15, and became the youngest-ever winner of that event. In November 1979, Torsam Khan, who had been one of the leading international squash players in the 1970s, died suddenly of a heart attack during an Australian Open match in Adelaide Australia. Torsam's death profoundly affected Khan. He considered quitting the game, but decided to pursue a career in the sport as a tribute to his brother.

He retired as a player in 1993, and has served as President of the World Squash Federation from 2002 to 2008, later became Emeritus President.

=== World Open final appearances ===
Wins (6)
Year	Opponent in final	Score in final
1981	Geoff Hunt	7–9, 9–1, 9–2, 9–2
1982	Dean Williams	9–2, 6–9, 9–1, 9–1
1983	Chris Dittmar	9–3, 9–6, 9–0
1984	Qamar Zaman	9–0, 9–3, 9–4
1985	Ross Norman	9–4, 4–9, 9–5, 9–1
1988	Jansher Khan	9–6, 9–2, 9–2
Runners-up (3)
Year	Opponent in final	Score in final
1986	Ross Norman	5–9, 7–9, 9–7, 1–9
1991	Rodney Martin	17–14, 9–15, 4–15, 13–15
1993	Jansher Khan	15–14, 9–15, 5–15, 5–15

=== British Open final appearances ===
Wins (10 consecutive)
Year	Opponent in final	Score in final
1982	Hiddy Jahan	9–2, 10–9, 9–3
1983	Gamal Awad	9–2, 9–5, 9–1
1984	Qamar Zaman	9–0, 9–3, 9–5
1985	Chris Dittmar	9–3, 9–2, 9–5
1986	Ross Norman	9–6, 9–4, 9–6
1987	Jansher Khan	9–6, 9–0, 9–5
1988	Rodney Martin	9–2, 9–10, 9–0, 9–1
1989	Rodney Martin	9–2, 3–9, 9–5, 0–9, 9–2
1990	Rodney Martin	9–6, 10–8, 9–1
1991	Jansher Khan	2–9, 9–4, 9–4, 9–0
Runners-up (1)
Year	Opponent in final	Score in final
1981	Geoff Hunt	2–9, 7–9, 9–5, 7–9

== Honors and awards ==
- 1981 – At age 17 became the youngest winner of the World Open, beating Australia's Geoff Hunt in final.
- 1982 – Received the Pride of Performance from the Government of Pakistan.
- 1984 – Featured on a Government of Pakistan issued postage stamp.
- 1989 – Received the Hilal-e-Imtiaz from the Government of Pakistan.
- 1999 – Sport and Youth Award by French Government.
- 2005 – Times Award – Time Magazine named Khan as one of Asia's Heroes in the last 60 years.
- 2007 – Awarded an honorary degree of Doctorate of Philosophy by London Metropolitan University.
- 2017 – Featured on a Government of Japan issued commemorative stamp.
- 2018 – Winner of the 8th Asian Award for Outstanding Achievement in Sport.
- 2023 – Nishan-e-Imtiaz by the President of Pakistan.

== Philanthropy ==
=== Shahid Afridi Foundation (SAF) ===
In 2018, Khan became global President of Shahid Afridi Foundation (SAF) in a ceremony held at Japan. SAF was founded by former cricketer Shahid Afridi which aims to provide healthcare and education facilities in Pakistan.

=== Niaz Support ===
In 2023, Khan was appointed as a global goodwill ambassador for Niaz Support, a Pakistani social enterprise that provides customized wheelchairs to people with disabilities.

== Books ==
- Winning Squash, Prentice Hall, 1986. Co-written with Charles Seely.
- Go and Play Squash : Techniques and Tactics, Stanley Paul, 1992.
- Learn Squash and Racquetball in a Weekend, Knopf / Dorling Kindersley, 1993.

== See also ==
- Khan squash family
- Jansher Khan
- World Open
- British Open
- World Squash
- List of Pakistanis
- Squash in Pakistan
- Sport in Pakistan

Sporting positions
Preceded by Qamar Zaman; Jansher Khan; Jansher Khan; Jansher Khan; Jansher Khan	World No. 1 January 1982 – December 1987; November 1988 – October 1989; March 1990 – April 1990; July 1990 – October 1990; January 1992 – April 1992	Succeeded by Jansher Khan; Jansher Khan; Jansher Khan; Jansher Khan; Jansher Khan
