= Chris Robertson (squash player) =

Australian squash player

Sport
- Country: Australia
- Handedness: Right-Handed
- Retired: 1992
- Highest ranking: 2 (March 1991)
Medal record
Men's squash
Representing Australia
World Championships
Bronze medal – third place	1986 Toulouse	Singles
Bronze medal – third place	1989 Kuala Lumpur	Singles
Bronze medal – third place	1990 Toulouse	Singles
Bronze medal – third place	1991 Adelaide	Singles
- Updated on 20 December 2011

Chris Robertson is a former professional squash player, from Brisbane Australia.

Robertson won the World Junior Squash Championship title in 1984, and went on to become one of the leading players in the men's professional game in the late 1980s and early 1990s, including finishing as runner-up to Jansher Khan in the British Open Squash Championships in 1992. He reached a career-high world ranking of number 2 in 1991. Robertson was part of the winning Australian team at the 1989 Men's World Team Squash Championships and the 1991 Men's World Team Squash Championships.

Robertson retired from the professional circuit in 1992 and was appointed as Squash Wales national coach in 1994. In 2011 Robertson was appointed England Head Coach of Squash and Racket Ball.
