= Jansher Khan =

Pakistani squash player (born 1969)

Jansher Khan PP SI HI NI
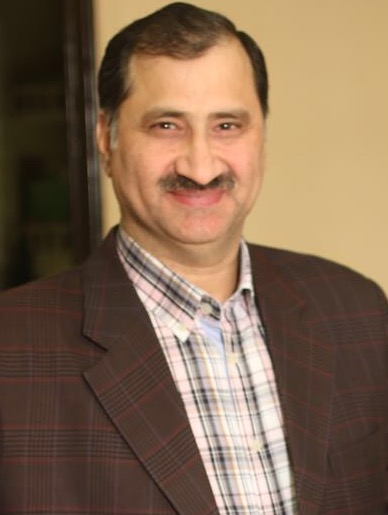

Personal information
- Native name: جان شیر خان
- Born: 15 June 1969 (age 57) Peshawar, Pakistan
- Occupations: National Head Squash Coach, Pakistan Squash Federation (2010–2011) Advisor to the President, Pakistan Squash Federation (2010–2012, 2015–2018) Head Squash Coach, Khyber Pakhtunkhwa (2020–2023)
- Years active: 1986–2002
- Employer: Pakistan Air Force
- Height: 6 ft 1 in (1.85 m)
- Spouse: Violet Sough (m. 1986; div. 1989) Naseem (m. 1989)
- Children: 3, including Kamran Khan, Ayaz SherKhan, and Ali SherKhan

Sport
- Country: Pakistan
- Sport: Squash
- World Open: 1987, 1989, 1990, 1992, 1993, 1994, 1995, 1996
- Turned pro: 1986
- Retired: 2001

Achievements and titles
- World finals: 8
- Highest world ranking: No. 1 (January 1988 – January 1998)
- Updated on 8 January 2024

Jansher Khan PP SI HI NI (Pashto: جان شیر خان; born 15 June 1969) is a former Pakistani professional squash player. During his career, he won the World Open eight times and the British Open six times. He was the world's number-one-ranked player from January 1988 to January 1998. He was unbeaten for 81 matches from 1990 to 1996; one of the longest unbeaten runs in professional squash history.

== Career ==
Khan's professional career began in 1986, when he won the World Junior Squash Championships in Australia at the age of 16. He challenged the dominance of fellow Pakistani Jahangir Khan, who had been undefeated for the previous five years. His first major senior title was the Hong Kong Open in 1987. That same year, he won his first World Open Title, defeating Australia's Chris Dittmar in the finals. Early in his career, Khan was affiliated with the Pakistan Air Force.

Jansher Khan's main rival was Jahangir Khan. Between 1986 and 1991, they collectively won 14 World Open and 16 British Open titles. Of the 36 tournament matches between them, Jansher won 19 and Jahangir won 17.

Head-to-head results vs. Jahangir Khan
Year	Total Matches	Won by Jansher Khan	Won by Jahangir Khan
1986	1	0	1
1987	11	7	4
1988	8	3	5
1989	9	2	7
1990	5	5	0
1991	2	2	0
Total	36	19	17

Khan retired from professional squash in 2001, citing burnout and injuries.

== Post-retirement ==
=== Health ===
In late 2011, Khan was diagnosed with Parkinson's disease. In 2020, after suffering from severe back pain, he underwent two successful back surgeries at Shifa International Hospital in Islamabad, Pakistan.

Following his surgery, Khan advised younger players on managing injuries.

"I would advise today's young players that along with their hard training they must take special care of their back, knee and groin injuries and treat minor ailments timely to avoid serious problems in future."

=== Coaching ===
In September 2020, at the request of the Chief Minister of Khyber Pakhtunkhwa, Mahmood Khan, Jansher Khan joined the Directorate General of Sports of Khyber Pakhtunkhwa as head coach. Upon his appointment, he stated, "I will do my best to fill the gap created in the game of squash and make the country a new world champion."

== Awards and recognition ==
Jansher Khan is the first Pakistani sportsman to win four major national honours.

- Pride of Performance awarded by the President of Pakistan in 1988
- Sitara-e-Imtiaz (Star of Excellence) awarded by the President of Pakistan in 1993
- Hilal-e-Imtiaz (Crescent of Excellence) awarded by the President of Pakistan in 1997
- Nishan-e-Imtiaz (Order of Excellence) awarded by the President of Pakistan in 2023

== Major finals ==
=== World Open ===
Outcome	Year	Location	Opponent in the final	Score in the final
Winner	1987	Birmingham, England	(Australia) Chris Dittmar	9–5, 9–4, 4–9, 9–6
Runner-up	1988	Amsterdam, Netherlands	(Pakistan) Jahangir Khan	9–6, 9–2, 9–2
Winner	1989	Kuala Lumpur, Malaysia	(Australia) Chris Dittmar	7–15, 6–15, 15–4, 15–11, 15–10
Winner	1990	Toulouse, France	(Australia) Chris Dittmar	15–8, 17–15, 13–15, 15–5
Winner	1992	Johannesburg, South Africa	(Australia) Chris Dittmar	15–11, 15–9, 10–15, 15–6
Winner	1993	Karachi, Pakistan	(Pakistan) Jahangir Khan	14–15, 15–9, 15–5, 15–5
Winner	1994	Barcelona, Spain	(England) Peter Marshall	10–15, 15–11, 15–8, 15–4
Winner	1995	Nicosia, Cyprus	(England) Del Harris	15–10, 17–14, 16–17, 15–8
Winner	1996	Karachi, Pakistan	(Australia) Rodney Eyles	15–13, 17–15, 11–15, 15–3

=== British Open ===
Outcome	Year	Location	Opponent in the final	Score in the final
Runner-up	1987	London, England	(Pakistan) Jahangir Khan	9–6, 9–0, 9–5
Runner-up	1991	London, England	(Pakistan) Jahangir Khan	2–9, 9–4, 9–4, 9–0
Winner	1992	London, England	(Australia) Chris Robertson	9–7, 10–9, 9–5
Winner	1993	London, England	(Australia) Chris Dittmar	9–6, 9–5, 6–9, 9–2
Winner	1994	London, England	(Australia) Brett Martin	9–1, 9–0, 9–10, 9–1
Winner	1995	Cardiff, Wales	(England) Peter Marshall	15–4, 15–4, 15–5
Winner	1996	Cardiff, Wales	(Australia) Rodney Eyles	15–13, 15–8, 15–10
Winner	1997	Cardiff, Wales	(Scotland) Peter Nicol	17–15, 9–15, 15–12, 8–15, 15–8
Runner-up	1998	Birmingham, England	(Scotland) Peter Nicol	17–16, 15–4, 15–5

=== Hong Kong Open ===
Outcome	Year	Location	Opponent in the final	Score in the final
Winner	1987	Hong Kong	(Australia) Chris Dittmar	9–6, 9–2, 9–5
Winner	1988	Hong Kong	(Australia) Chris Dittmar	15–11, 9–15, 15–6, 12–15, 15–1
Winner	1989	Hong Kong	(Australia) Chris Dittmar	15–8, 16–17, 15–2, 15–6
Winner	1990	Hong Kong	(Australia) Chris Robertson	15–6, 14–15, 15–10, 15–5
Winner	1991	Hong Kong	(Australia) Tristan Nancarrow	16–17, 15–6, 15–17, 15–4, 15–5
Winner	1994	Hong Kong	(Scotland) Peter Nicol	15–7, 15–10, 15–6
Winner	1995	Hong Kong	(Australia) Brett Martin	15–12, 15–7, 15–3
Runner-up	1996	Hong Kong	(Australia) Rodney Eyles	15–10, 15–10, 15–5
Winner	1997	Hong Kong	(Canada) Jonathon Power	14–15, 15–12, 15–7, 15–2

=== Pakistan Open ===
Outcome	Year	Location	Opponent in the final	Score in the final
Winner	1987	Karachi, Pakistan	(Pakistan) Jahangir Khan	1–9, 9–1, 10–8, 9–5, 9–0
Runner-up	1988	Karachi, Pakistan	(Pakistan) Jahangir Khan	16–17, 10–15, 15–9, 15–9, 15–7
Runner-up	1989	Karachi, Pakistan	(Pakistan) Jahangir Khan	15–11, 15–12, 15–10
Winner	1990	Karachi, Pakistan	(Pakistan) Jahangir Khan	9–2, 4–9, 9–2, 9–2
Runner-up	1991	Karachi, Pakistan	(Pakistan) Jahangir Khan	9–15, 15–10, 15–10, 15–5
Winner	1992	Karachi, Pakistan	(Pakistan) Jahangir Khan	15–13, 15–5, 15–12
Winner	1994	Karachi, Pakistan	(England) Peter Marshall	14–15, 15–14, 15–10, 9–15, 15–6
Winner	1995	Karachi, Pakistan	(Australia) Rodney Eyles	15–9, 15–12, 15–8
Winner	1997	Karachi, Pakistan	(Australia) Anthony Hill	15–11, 15–7, 15–8

=== World Super Series Finals ===
Outcome	Year	Location	Opponent in the final	Score in the final
Winner	1993	Zürich, Switzerland	(Australia) Chris Dittmar	15–10, 10–15, 15–13, 15–8
Winner	1994	Zürich, Switzerland	(England) Peter Marshall	8–15, 15–8, 15–7, 15–9
Winner	1997	Hatfield, England	(Australia) Brett Martin	9–7, 9–5, 9–2
Winner	1998	Hatfield, England	(England) Simon Parke	15–12, 13–15, 15–11, 15–10

Sporting positions
Preceded by Jahangir Khan	World No. 1 January 1988 – January 1998	Succeeded by Peter Nicol

== See also ==
- Jahangir Khan
- World Open
- British Open
- World Squash
- List of Pakistanis
- Squash in Pakistan
- Sport in Pakistan
