= Tristan Nancarrow =

Australian squash player (born 1964)

Personal information
- Born: 1964 (age 61–62) Australia

Sport
- Country: Australia
- Handedness: Right handed
- Turned pro: 1986
- Retired: 1994

Men's singles
- Highest ranking: No. 5 (1993)
Medal record
Men's squash
Representing Australia
World Championships
Bronze medal – third place	1990 Toulouse	Singles

Tristan Nancarrow (born 1964) is a former Australian professional squash player.

Tristan is part of a famous squash family; his step-father Cam Nancarrow and mother Mavis Nancarrow were both leading international players in the late 1960s and early 1970s. Tristan himself became a leading player in the early 1990s, reaching a world ranking of five in January 1993.

As a young boy, he lived near Sydney and was at the Harbord Primary School, Northern Beaches, Sydney NSW and Manly Boys High School.

In 1984, at the age of 20, he won the national Australian open title.

He finished runner-up at the Hong-Kong Open in 1986 (lost to Rodney Martin) and 1991 (lost to Jansher Khan).

He represented Australia in the 1993 World Team Squash Championships but is arguably remembered more for the fact that he was considered the John McEnroe of squash. In September 1989 just three months after a three-month ban imposed after the British Open Squash Championships he walked off court during a match against Jansher Khan. In April 1993 he was suspended for a third time following a string of disciplinary offences.

He now builds and refurbishes tennis courts.
