= Brett Martin (squash player) =

Australian squash player (born 1963)

Personal information
- Nickname: Popeye
- Born: 23 January 1963 (age 63) Queensland

Sport
- Country: Australia
- Handedness: Right-Handed
- Turned pro: 1989
- Retired: 1997
- Highest ranking: 2 (March 1994)

Brett Martin (born 23 January 1963) is a former professional squash player who was among the game's leading players in the late-1980s and early-1990s. Brett was part of the winning Australian team at the 1989 Men's World Team Squash Championships and 1991 Men's World Team Squash Championships and was also a runner-up in the 1993 Men's World Team Squash Championships. He reached a career-high world ranking of World No. 2 in 1994.

Martin comes from one of squash's most successful families. His brother Rodney Martin and sister Michelle Martin were also top professional players.
