= 1983 Men's British Open Squash Championship =

British Open Squash Championships
- 45th British Open Championships

Details
- Location: Derby, England
- Venue: Carrington Club and Derby Assembly Rooms
- Dates: 4–11 April 1983

The 1983 Davies and Tate British Open Championships was held at the Carrington Club with the later stages being held at the Derby Assembly Rooms from 4–11 April 1983.

Jahangir Khan won his second consecutive title defeating Gamal Awad in the final.

== Seeds ==
1. (Pakistan) Jahangir Khan
2. (Pakistan) Hiddy Jahan
3. (Pakistan) Qamar Zaman
4. (Australia) Dean Williams
5. (Egypt) Gamal Awad
6. (Pakistan) Maqsood Ahmed
7. (New Zealand) Ross Norman
8. (England) Gawain Briars

(Australia) Glen Brumby - seed 10
(Egypt) Ahmed Safwat - seed 11
(New Zealand) Stuart Davenport - seed 13
(Australia) Chris Dittmar - seed 15
(Egypt) Magdi Saad
(Sweden) Lars Kvant

(Egypt) Aly Abdel Aziz

== Draw and results ==
=== Final ===
(Pakistan) Jahangir Khan beat (Egypt) Gamal Awad 9-2 9-5 9-1

=== Section 1 ===
First round
1	(Pakistan) Jahangir Khan	9	9	9
(England) Steve Bateman	3	5	3
(England) Charles Edwards	7	9	9	9
(Pakistan) Mohammed Yasin	9	0	2	1
(Egypt) Aly Abdel Aziz
(England) Neil Harvey	10	4	9	9
(Australia) Rodney George	8	9	4	3
15	(Australia) Chris Dittmar	9	9	9
(England) Mark Hornby	5	1	1
(Pakistan) Umar Hayat Khan
8	(England) Gawain Briars	9	9	9
(New Zealand) Craig Blackwood	6	4	3
(England) Peter Verow	9	9	9
(England) Ian Robinson	4	3	4
3	(Pakistan) Qamar Zaman	9	10	9
(Egypt) Nasser Zahran	6	8	4
(Egypt) Aladin Alouba
(England) Christy Willstrop	9	9	9
(England) Barry Watkins	4	2	1
(England) David Lloyd	10	9	9
(Egypt) Mohammed Asran	9	4	1
7	(New Zealand) Ross Norman	9	9	7	9	9
(Zimbabwe) Trevor Wilkinson	10	2	9	5	5
(Australia) Ross Thorne
11	(Egypt) Ahmed Safwat
(England) Jamie Hickox
(England) Zain Saleh	5	10	9	9
(Pakistan) Daulat Khan	9	9	3	4

Second round
1	(Pakistan) Jahangir K	10	9	9
(England) Edwards	0	1	0
(Egypt) Aziz	9	9	9
(England) Harvey	3	7	3
15	(New Zealand) Dittmar	9	9	9
(Pakistan) Hayat Khan	4	5	5
8	(England) Briars	9	9	10
(England) Verow	1	4	8
3	(Pakistan) Zaman	6	9	9	9
(Egypt) Alouba	9	1	1	3
(England) Willstrop	9	10	4	9
(England) Lloyd	2	8	9	7
7	(New Zealand) Norman	10	9	9
(Australia) Thorne	8	3	7
(England) Hickox	9	6	9	7	10
(England) Saleh	7	9	5	9	8

Third round
1	(Pakistan) Jahangir	9	9	9
(Egypt) Aziz	2	2	3
15	(Australia) Dittmar	4	9	9	6	9
8	(England) Briars	9	4	7	9	7
3	(Pakistan) Zaman	9	9	9
(England) Willstrop	4	6	4
7	(New Zealand) Norman	6	6	9	9	9
(England) Hickox	9	9	3	0	3

Quarter-finals
1	(Pakistan) Jahangir	9	9	9
15	(Australia) Dittmar	0	3	4
Semi-finals
1	(Pakistan) Jahangir K	9	9	9
3	(Pakistan) Zaman	6	6	2
3	(Pakistan) Zaman	4	9	9
7	(New Zealand) Norman	4	1	5

=== Section 2 ===
First round
2	(Pakistan) Hiddy Jahan	9	9	0	9
(Sweden) Johan Stockenberg	1	2	9	0
(Australia) Greg Pollard	10	2	9	10
(England) John Easter	8	9	2	9
(Sweden) Lars Kvant	9	9	9
(Sweden) Fredrik Johnson	3	1	5
(England) Geoff Williams	9	9	9
(Guernsey) John Le Lievre	0	2	4
5	(Egypt) Gamal Awad	9	9	9
(Sweden) Claes Eriksson	0	0	0
(Sweden) Jan-Ulf Söderberg	5	3	9	9	9
(Pakistan) Zahir Hussein Khan	9	9	2	7	1
(Egypt) Magdi Saad	9	9	9
(Sweden) Björn Almström	4	6	1
(England) David Pearson	9	9	9
(Pakistan) Sohail Qaiser	4	5	7
13	(New Zealand) Stuart Davenport
(England) Ashley Naylor
6	(Pakistan) Maqsood Ahmed	9	9	9
(England) Simon Rolington	6	5	4
4	(Australia) Dean Williams	9	9	9
(Wales) Teifion Salisbury	3	4	3
(Egypt) Moussa Helal	9	9	9
(Finland) Markku Sainio	4	5	0
(Egypt) Mohammed Awad
(England) Martin Bodimeade	8	9	9	9
10	(Australia) Glen Brumby	10	6	3	0

Second round
2	(Pakistan) Jahan	9	10	9
(Australia) Pollard	2	8	3
(Sweden) Kvant	10	9	9
(England) Williams G	8	2	2
5	(Egypt) Awad G	9	9	9
(Sweden) Söderberg	3	4	4
(Egypt) Saad	9	9	9
(England) Pearson	4	1	1
13	(New Zealand) Davenport	9	9	9
(England) Naylor	1	3	1
6	(Pakistan) Maqsood A	9	9	9
6	1	5
4	(Australia) Williams D	9	9	9
(Egypt) Helal	2	2	6
(Egypt) Awad M
(England) Bodimeade

Third round
2	(Pakistan) Jahan	9	9	9
(Sweden) Kvant	7	1	6
5	(Egypt) Awad G	9	9	9
(Egypt) Saad	4	2	2
13	(New Zealand) Davenport	9	9	9
6	(Pakistan) Maqsood A	1	0	2
4	(Australia) Williams D	9	6
(Egypt) Awad M	2	2	ret

Quarter-finals
2	(Pakistan) Jahan	9	2	9	2	1
5	(Egypt) Awad G	4	9	5	9	9
Semi-finals
5	(Egypt) Awad G	10	9	9
4	(Australia) Williams D	8	0	0
13	(New Zealand) Davenport	6	3	9
4	(Australia) Williams D	9	9	10

Gogi Alauddin & Karimullah Khan of Pakistan both failed to attend their first round matches and were disqualified.

Preceded by 1982	British Open Squash Championships; England (Derby); 1983	Succeeded by 1984
