= 1982 Men's British Open Squash Championship =

British Open Squash Championships
- 44th British Open Championships

Details
- Location: Greater London, England
- Venue: Bromley Town Squash Centre and Churchill Theatre, Bromley
- Dates: 29 March – 8 April 1982

The 1982 Audi British Open Championships was held at the Bromley Town Squash Club with the later stages being held at the Churchill Theatre, Bromley, Greater London from 29 March – 8 April 1982.
Jahangir Khan won his first title defeating Hiddy Jahan in the final. Defending champion and eight times winner Geoff Hunt the number two seed withdrew through injury just before the tournament started.

== Seeds ==
1. (Pakistan) Jahangir Khan
2. (Australia) Geoff Hunt – withdrew
3. (Pakistan) Qamar Zaman
4. (Pakistan) Hiddy Jahan
5. (Pakistan) Maqsood Ahmed
6. (Egypt) Gamal Awad
7. (Australia) Dean Williams
8. (South Africa) Roland Watson
9. (England) Gawain Briars

(Australia) Glen Brumby – seed 11
(New Zealand) Ross Norman – seed 13
(Egypt) Aly Abdel Aziz – seed 14 (withdrew)
(England) Phil Kenyon – seed 15
(Sweden) Lars Kvant
(Egypt) Ahmed Safwat

(Pakistan) Gogi Alauddin

== Draw and results ==
=== Final ===
(Pakistan) Jahangir Khan beat (Pakistan) Hiddy Jahan 9–2 10–9 9–3

=== Section 1 ===
First round
1	(Pakistan) Jahangir Khan	9	9	9
(Pakistan) Mohammed Ali Somjee	4	1	4
(Pakistan) Mohibullah Khan	9	9	9
(New Zealand) Chris Caird	0	4	4
(Pakistan) Gogi Alauddin	9	9	9
(Australia) Kevin Shawcross	2	5	1
(Egypt) Abbas Kaoud	2	9	3	9	9
(England) Jonathan Leslie	9	0	9	3	2
13	(New Zealand) Ross Norman	9	9	9
(Egypt) Nasser Zahran	6	1	3
(New Zealand) Stuart Davenport	9	9	7	9
(Sweden) Johan Stockenberg	7	7	9	6
(Pakistan) Sohail Qaiser	9	9	9
(England) Adrian Jaski	5	0	3
8	(South Africa) Roland Watson	9	9	9
(Sweden) Leif Leiner	1	6	0
3	(Pakistan) Qamar Zaman	9	9	9
(England) Geoff Williams	7	2	3
(Australia) Ross Thorne
(Egypt) Ahmed Safwat	9	9	4	9
(England) John Easter	7	4	9	2
(Pakistan) Daulat Khan	3	9	9	7	9
(England) Ian Robinson	9	4	0	9	5
7	(Australia) Dean Williams
(Australia) Chris Dittmar
(Sweden) Lars Kvant	9	1	9	2	9
(England) John Le Lievre	2	9	6	9	6
(Pakistan) Jamshed Gul	3	9	9	9
(Zimbabwe) Trevor Wilkinson	9	6	6	2

Second round
1	(Pakistan) Jahangir Khan	10	9	9
(Pakistan) Mohibullah Khan	8	5	2
(Pakistan) Alauddin	9	9	9
(Egypt) Kaoud	5	6	2
13	(New Zealand) Norman	9	9	9
(New Zealand) Davenport	2	3	0
(Pakistan) Qaiser	8	9	10	9
8	(South Africa) Watson	10	3	8	7
3	(Pakistan) Zaman	9	9	9
(Australia) Thorne	4	0	3
(Egypt) Safwat	9	7	9	9
(Pakistan) Daulat Khan	1	9	2	5
7	(Australia) Williams	9	9	9
(Australia) Dittmar	3	4	4
(Sweden) Kvant	4	9	9	5	9
(Pakistan) Jamshed Gul	9	1	4	9	5

Third round
1	(Pakistan) Jahangir Khan	9	9	9
(Pakistan) Alauddin	4	1	1
13	(New Zealand) Norman	4	9	9	9
(Pakistan) Qaiser	9	4	6	4
3	(Pakistan) Zaman	9	9	9
(Egypt) Safwat	1	1	1
7	(Australia) Williams	9	9	9
(Sweden) Kvant	2	3	1

Quarter-finals
1	(Pakistan) Jahangir Khan	9	9	9
13	(New Zealand) Norman	5	3	3
Semi-finals
1	(Pakistan) Jahangir Khan	9	9	9
3	(Pakistan) Zaman	5	5	1
3	(Pakistan) Zaman	4	9	9	9
7	(Australia) Williams	9	5	0	2

=== Section 2 ===
First round
4	(Pakistan) Hiddy Jahan	9	9	9
(South Africa) Alan Colburn	4	3	2
(Egypt) Moussa Helal	9	10	9
(Pakistan) Mohammed Yasin	1	8	6
(Egypt) Mohammed Awad
(New Zealand) Craig Blackwood	9	9	9
(Australia) Peter Nance	0	6	6
5	(Pakistan) Maqsood Ahmed	9	10	9
(New Zealand) Robin Espie	7	8	4
(England) Christy Willstrop	9	9	3	10
(Egypt) Magdi Saad	6	7	9	8
9	(England) Gawain Briars	9	9	9
(Egypt) Gamal el-Amir	1	5	1
(Pakistan) Zahir Hussein Khan	10	9	9
(England) Mike Robinson	9	2	3
11	(Australia) Glen Brumby	9	10	9
(England) Steve Bateman	1	8	5
(New Zealand) Rod Hayes	9	9	9
(England) Peter Verow	3	3	1
(Pakistan) Fahim Gul
(Sweden) Claes Eriksson
15	(England) Phil Kenyon	9	9	9
(England) Andrew Dwyer	5	4	4
(Australia) Rodney George
6	(Egypt) Gamal Awad	9	9	9
(Australia) Frank Donnelly	2	3	6
(Australia) Steve Bowditch

Second round
4	(Pakistan) Jahan	9	9	9
(Egypt) Helal	0	1	2
(Egypt) Awad M	9	9	9
(New Zealand) Blackwood	3	0	6
5	(Pakistan) Maqsood A	6	9	9	9
(England) Willstrop	9	0	6	0
9	(England) Briars	9	9	10
(Pakistan) Zahir Hussein	1	1	8
11	(Australia) Brumby	9	9	9
(New Zealand) Hayes	4	0	0
(Pakistan) Fahim Gul	9	9	9
(Sweden) Eriksson	6	1	5
15	(England) Kenyon	9	9	9
(Australia) George	4	5	1
6	(Egypt) Awad G	10	5	9	4	9
(Australia) Bowditch	9	9	3	9	2

Third round
4	(Pakistan) Jahan	9	9	9
(Egypt) Awad M	7	2	1
5	(Pakistan) Maqsood A	1	9	10	9
9	(England) Briars	9	1	8	3
11	(Australia) Brumby	9	9	9
(Pakistan) Fahim Gul	2	3	7
15	(England) Kenyon	2	7	9	10	9
6	(Egypt) Awad G	9	9	7	8	3

Quarter-finals
4	(Pakistan) Jahan	7	9	9	9
5	(Pakistan) Maqsood A	9	6	0	3
Semi-finals
4	(Pakistan) Jahan	3	9	9	9
11	(Australia) Brumby	9	4	3	3
11	(Australia) Brumby	9	9	9
15	(England) Kenyon	4	1	5

Preceded by 1981	British Open Squash Championships; England (London); 1982	Succeeded by 1983
