= 1984 Men's British Open Squash Championship =

Squash tournament

British Open Squash Championships
- 46th British Open Championships

Details
- Location: London, England (early rounds Brighton)
- Venue: Wembley Squash Centre
- Dates: 2–10 April 1984

The 1984 Davies & Tate British Open Championships was held at Wembley Squash Centre in London, from 3–10 April 1984.
Jahangir Khan won his third consecutive title defeating Qamar Zaman in the final.

Hiddy Jahan represented England from 1984 and was a shock loser in the last 16 round held at Brighton.

== Seeds ==
1. (Pakistan) Jahangir Khan
2. (Pakistan) Qamar Zaman
3. (Egypt) Gamal Awad
4. (England) Hiddy Jahan
5. (New Zealand) Stuart Davenport
6. (Australia) Dean Williams
7. (England) Phil Kenyon
8. (Australia) Chris Dittmar (withdrew injured)
9. (England) Gawain Briars
10. (New Zealand) Ross Norman
11. (Pakistan) Maqsood Ahmed
12. (Australia) Ross Thorne
13. (Egypt) Magdi Saad
14. (Australia) Ricki Hill
15. (Egypt) Ahmed Safwat
16. (Australia) Steve Bowditch

== Draw and results ==
=== Final ===
(Pakistan) Jahangir Khan beat (Pakistan) Qamar Zaman 9-0 9-3 9-5

=== Section 1 ===
First round
1	(Pakistan) Jahangir Khan	7	9	9	9
(Pakistan) Daulat Khan	9	2	1	5
(Pakistan) Gogi Alauddin	0	10	9	9
(Sweden) Jonas Gornerup	9	9	4	2
13	(Egypt) Magdi Saad	5	10	9	9
(Egypt) Moussa Helal	9	9	1	1
(England) Jamie Hickox	9	2	9	7	9
(England) Simon Rolington	2	9	6	9	3
(Egypt) Gamal El Amir	9	9	9
(England) Ian Robinson	3	1	6
(Sweden) Björn Almström	9	9	7	9
(Pakistan) Mohammed Ali Somjee	6	3	9	6
10	(New Zealand) Ross Norman	3	9	5	9	9
(South Africa) Stuart Hailstone	9	2	9	1	2
(Australia) Glen Brumby	9	9	9
(England) Danny Lee	5	6	4
4	(England) Hiddy Jahan	9	9	9
(England) John Le Lievre	0	1	6
(Australia) Rodney George	8	8	9	10	9
(Australia) Rodney Eyles	10	10	2	8	6
11	(Pakistan) Maqsood Ahmed	9	9	10
(England) Martin Bodimeade	6	2	8
(Sweden) Lars Kvant	2	10	9	9
(England) Mike Robinson	9	8	4	2
5	(New Zealand) Stuart Davenport	9	9	9
(England) Peter Verow	3	0	6
(England) Neil Harvey	9	7	9	9
(Republic of Ireland) Robert Forde	3	9	2	5
16	(Australia) Steve Bowditch	1	9	8	9	9
(Australia) Stephen Vocetti	9	5	10	4	5
(Egypt) Nasser Zahran	9	9	9
(South Africa) Ian Holding	7	3	1

Second round
1	(Pakistan) Jahangir Khan	9	9	9
(Pakistan) Alauddin	1	2	0
13	(Egypt) Saad	5	1	9	9	9
(England) Hickox	9	9	4	3	0
(Egypt) El Amir	9	8	4	9	10
(Sweden) Alstrom	3	10	9	6	8
10	(New Zealand) Norman	7	9	9	9	9
(Australia) Brumby	9	10	2	2	3
4	(England) Jahan	9	4	9	9
(Australia) George	6	9	2	3
11	(Pakistan) M Ahmed	9	9	9
(Sweden) Kvant	2	4	2
5	(New Zealand) Davenport	5	9	9	9
(England) Harvey	9	5	7	0
(Egypt) Zahran	9	10	8	7	9
16	(Australia) Bowditch	6	8	10	9	7

Third round
1	(Pakistan) Jahangir Khan	9	9	9
13	(Egypt) Saad	3	6	2
10	(New Zealand) Norman	9	10	9
(Egypt) El Amir	4	8	5
4	(England) Jahan	2	4	2
11	(Pakistan) M Ahmed	9	9	9
5	(New Zealand) Davenport	9	9	9
(Egypt) Zahran	0	0	2

Quarter-finals
1	(Pakistan) Jahangir Khan	9	9	9
10	(New Zealand) Norman	5	0	0
Semi-finals
1	(Pakistan) Jahangir Khan	9	9	9
5	(New Zealand) Davenport	7	6	2
11	(Pakistan) Ahmed M	5	7	9	1
5	(New Zealand) Davenport	9	9	1	9

=== Section 2 ===
First round
(Pakistan) Umar Hayat Khan	9	4	9	9
(England) Andrew Dwyer	3	9	4	2
12	(Australia) Ross Thorne	9	9	9	9
(Egypt) A Aref	10	5	2	1
(Pakistan) Sohail Qaiser	9	1	10	9
(Sweden) Bosse Boström	6	9	8	1
6	(Australia) Dean Williams	4	9	5	9	10
(Australia) Grantley Pinnington	9	4	9	2	9
(Sweden) Jan Ulf Soderberg	5	2	9	9	9
(England) David Lloyd	9	9	3	1	0
15	(Egypt) Ahmed Safwat	9	9	9
(South Africa) Richard O'Connor	7	0	3
(England) Geoff Williams	9	9	9
(England) Mark Hornby	0	0	1
3	(Egypt) Gamal Awad	9	9	9
(Republic of Ireland) Willie Hosey	7	0	5
(Egypt) Aladin Alouba	9	6	9	9
(England) Ashley Naylor	3	9	2	6
9	(England) Gawain Briars	9	9	9
(South Africa) Murray Winckler	1	2	2
(Egypt) Hesham El Attar	9	9	8	2	9
(England) Christy Willstrop	5	4	10	9	7
(Australia) Kelvin Smith	9	9	2	9
7	(England) Phil Kenyon	0	5	9	0
(England) Bryan Beeson	6	9	9	9
(Egypt) Mohamed Awad	9	6	6	0
14	(Australia) Ricki Hill	9	10	6	10
(England) David Pearson	4	8	9	8
(Australia) Greg Pollard	9	9	9
(Sweden) Fredrik Johnson	1	4	0
2	(Pakistan) Qamar Zaman	9	6	9	9
(Sweden) Anders Bergsten	1	9	3	3

Second round
(Pakistan) Hayat Khan	5	7	8
12	(Australia) Thorne	9	9	10
(Pakistan) Qaiser	3	2	5
6	(Australia) Williams D	9	9	9
(Sweden) Soderberg	8	9	3	5
15	(Egypt) Safwat	10	3	9	9
(England) Williams G	9	9	9
3	(Egypt) Awad G	1	1	1
(Egypt) Alouba	0	9	2	9
9	(England) Briars	9	3	9	10
(Egypt) El Attar	9	1	3
(Australia) Smith	10	9	9
(England) Beeson	6	4	2
14	(Australia) Hill	9	9	9
(Australia) Pollard	9	9	4	8	4
2	(Pakistan) Zaman	4	2	9	10	9

Third round
12	(Australia) Thorne	10	9	3	10
6	(Australia) Williams D	9	3	9	9
15	(Egypt) Safwat	9	8	9	6	0
(England) Williams G	7	9	3	9	9
9	(England) Briars	9	9	9
(Australia) Smith	1	5	5
14	(Australia) Hill	6	7	0
2	(Pakistan) Zaman	9	9	9

Quarter-finals
12	(Australia) Thorne	4	3	6
(England) Williams G	9	9	9
Semi-finals
(England) Williams G	8	5	9	3
2	(Pakistan) Zaman	10	9	4	9
9	(England) Briars	9	1	6	2
2	(Pakistan) Zaman	6	9	9	9

Preceded by 1983	British Open Squash Championships; England (London); 1984	Succeeded by 1985
