= 1983 Men's World Open Squash Championship =

Squash tournament

Men's World Open 1983
- 7th PSA World Squash Championship
- Location: Munich, West Germany
- Date: 1–6 December 1983

PSA World Tour
- Category: World Open

Results
- Champion: (Pakistan) Jahangir Khan
- Runner-up: (Australia) Chris Dittmar
- Semi-finalists: (New Zealand) Stuart Davenport (Egypt) Gamal Awad

The 1983 Canadian Club Men's World Open Squash Championship was the men's edition of the 1983 World Open, which served as the individual world championship for squash players. The event took place in Munich in West Germany from 1 December to 6 December 1983. Jahangir Khan won his third consecutive World Open title, defeating Chris Dittmar in the final.

== Seeds ==
1. (Pakistan) Jahangir Khan (champion)
2. (Pakistan) Qamar Zaman (quarterfinals)
3. (Australia) Dean Williams (quarterfinals)
4. (England) Hiddy Jahan (third round)
5. (New Zealand) Stuart Davenport (semifinals)
6. (England) Phil Kenyon (quarterfinals)
7. (Egypt) Gamal Awad (quarterfinals)
8. (England) Gawain Briars (second round)

== Draw and results ==
=== First round ===
Player One	Player Two	Score
(Pakistan) Jahangir Khan	(West Germany) Carol Martini	9-0 9-2 9-2
(Pakistan) Qamar Zaman	(Australia) Greg Pollard	9-3 5-9 9-7 9-6
(England) Hiddy Jahan	(England) Simon Rolington	9-4 7-9 9-4 9-0
(New Zealand) Stuart Davenport	(France) Patrice Chautard	9-1 9-1 9-1
(England) Phil Kenyon	(England) Barry Watkins	9-1 9-2 9-4
(Egypt) Gamal Awad	(Egypt) Alam Soliman	9-4 9-5 10-9
(England) Gawain Briars	(Pakistan) Daulat Khan	9-3 8-10 9-6 9-1
(Egypt) Ahmed Safwat	(England) Danny Lee	6-9 9-7 10-8 9-3
(Australia) Ross Thorne	(South Africa) Richard O'Connor	9-6 9-2 9-6
(Pakistan) Maqsood Ahmed	(Egypt) Mo Asran	9-5 9-6 9-6
(Australia) Steve Bowditch	(New Zealand) Chris Caird	9-5 9-6 6-9 9-3
(England) Geoff Williams	(England) Barry O'Connor	9-5 9-6 9-5
(Australia) Chris Dittmar (13)	(Sweden) Johan Westerholm	9-0 9-2 9-0
(Australia) Dean Williams	(England) Sean Flynn	9-10 9-5 9-3 9-2
(England) Jamie Hickox	(England) Ian Robinson	9-1 9-5 9-6
(Pakistan) Mohammed Ali Somjee	(Republic of Ireland) Robert Forde	9-2 9-3 10-9
(Pakistan) Gogi Alauddin	(Egypt) Nasser Zahran	9-1 9-4 9-3
(Egypt) Magdi Saad	(West Germany) Ralf Schuldt	9-3 9-5 9-6
(Sweden) Lars Kvant	(England) Andrew Dwyer	9-6 10-9 10-9
(South Africa) Trevor Wilkinson	(Pakistan) Ali Raza Khan	9-4 9-7 9-5
(Australia) Glen Brumby	(West Germany) Marc Rummel	9-3 9-1 9-1
(Australia) Ricki Hill	(Pakistan) Abbas Khan	9-6 9-1 9-0
(Australia) Stephen Vocetti	(Pakistan) Zahir Hussein Khan	9-0 9-5 9-4
(Pakistan) Fahim Gul	(Sweden) Jonas Gornerup	9-7 2-9 9-0 9-7
(Pakistan) Umar Hayat Khan	(Pakistan) Khadim Khan	9-6 10-8 7-9 9-3
(Australia) Kelvin Smith	(Australia) Frank Donnelly	9-1 9-3 9-4
(Pakistan) Karimullah Khan	(England) Ashley Naylor	6-9 9-6 9-0 9-0
(Egypt) Aly Abdel Aziz	(Sweden) Björn Almström	10-9 9-4 2-9 10-9
(England) David Lloyd	(England) Christy Willstrop	9-5 10-9 6-9 1-9 9-7
(Sweden) Jan-Ulf Söderberg	(Egypt) Mohammed Awad	7-9 9-7 9-7 9-3
(Egypt) Moussa Helal	(England) Zain Saleh	9-2 8-10 9-5 10-8

=== Main draw ===
Second round
1	(Pakistan) Jahangir Khan	9	9	9
(Egypt) Moussa Helal	6	2	0
(Egypt) Ahmed Safwat	3	9	9	9
(Sweden) Jan-Ulf Söderberg	9	3	2	5
6	(England) Phil Kenyon	9	5	7	9	9
(England) David Lloyd	1	9	9	4	1
(England) Geoff Williams	w/o
(Egypt) Aly Abdel Aziz	scr
7	(Egypt) Gamal Awad	10	9	9
(Sweden) Lars Kvant	8	3	7
(Australia) Steve Bowditch	9	9	9
(South Africa) Trevor Wilkinson	6	5	2
3	(Australia) Dean Williams	9	5	10
(Pakistan) Gogi Alauddin	7	9	8	ret
(Australia) Ross Thorne	9	9	9
(England) Neil Harvey	7	2	1
2	(Pakistan) Qamar Zaman	9	9	9
(Pakistan) Mohammed Ali Somjee	6	2	4
(Egypt) Magdi Saad	6	9	9	7	10
(Australia) Kelvin Smith	9	4	5	9	9
5	(New Zealand) Stuart Davenport	9	9	9
(Pakistan) Karimullah Khan	1	3	3
(Australia) Glen Brumby	9	9	9
(Pakistan) Umar Hayat Khan	3	0	4
13	(Australia) Chris Dittmar	9	9	9
(Pakistan) Fahim Gul	0	4	2
4	(England) Hiddy Jahan	9	9	9
(England) Jamie Hickox	7	3	0
(Pakistan) Maqsood Ahmed	9	9	9
(Australia) Stephen Vocetti	7	1	3
(Australia) Ricki Hill	9	5	1	9	9
8	(England) Gawain Briars	5	9	9	1	1

Third round
1	(Pakistan) J Khan	9	9	9
(Egypt) Safwat	2	0	2
6	(England) Kenyon	9	9	9
(England) Williams G	4	0	4
7	(Egypt) Awad	9	9	10
(Australia) Bowditch	6	3	9
3	(Australia) Williams D	9
(Australia) Thorne	6	ret
2	(Pakistan) Zaman	9	9	9
(Egypt) Saad	4	7	2
5	(New Zealand) Davenport	9	10	9	9
(Australia) Brumby	4	8	3	6
13	(Australia) Dittmar	9	9	5	9
4	(England) Jahan	6	6	9	4
(Pakistan) Ahmed	6	9	9	9
(Australia) Hill	9	7	0	7

Quarter-finals
1	(Pakistan) J Khan	9	9	9
6	(England) Kenyon	6	0	6
7	(Egypt) Awad	10	9	9
3	(Australia) Williams D	8	5	4
2	(Pakistan) Zaman	6	8	1
5	(New Zealand) Davenport	9	10	9
13	(Australia) Dittmar	9	9	9
(Pakistan) Ahmed	1	7	5

Semi-finals
1	(Pakistan) J Khan	9	9	9
7	(Egypt) Awad	0	1	0
Final
1	(Pakistan) J Khan	9	9	9
13	(Australia) Dittmar	3	6	0
5	(New Zealand) Davenport	3	3	6
13	(Australia) Dittmar	9	9	9

=== Third Place ===
Player One	Player Two	Score
(Egypt) Gamal Awad	(New Zealand) Stuart Davenport	9-6 0-9 9-6 10-9

== See also ==
- PSA World Open
- 1983 Women's World Open Squash Championship

Preceded by England (Birmingham); 1982	World Open; West Germany (Munich); 1983	Succeeded by Karachi (Pakistan); 1984
