= 1982 Men's World Open Squash Championship =

Men's World Open 1982
- 6th PSA World Squash Championship
- Location: Birmingham, England
- Date: 6–16 November 1982

PSA World Tour
- Category: World Open

Results
- Champion: (Pakistan) Jahangir Khan
- Runner-up: (Australia) Dean Williams
- Semi-finalists: (Pakistan) Hiddy Jahan (Australia) Glen Brumby

The 1982 Audi Men's World Open Squash Championship is the men's edition of the 1982 World Open, which serves as the individual world championship for squash players. The event took place in the National Exhibition Centre, Birmingham in England from the quarter final stage onwards. The event lasted from 6 November until 16 November 1982. Jahangir Khan won his second consecutive World Open title, defeating Dean Williams in the final.
The early rounds were held at squash clubs throughout cities and towns in Britain including matches in Colwyn Bay, Blackpool, Bradford, Leeds, Wanstead, Basingstoke, Ilkeston and Colchester.

== Seeds ==
1. (Pakistan) Jahangir Khan (champion)
2. (Pakistan) Hiddy Jahan (semi-finals)
3. (Pakistan) Qamar Zaman (quarter-finals)
4. (Pakistan) Maqsood Ahmed (quarter-finals)
5. (Egypt) Gamal Awad (quarter-finals)
6. (Australia) Dean Williams (final)
7. (New Zealand) Ross Norman (third round)
8. (Australia) Glen Brumby (semi-finals)
9. (England) Gawain Briars (second round)
10. (South Africa) Roland Watson (third round)
11. (Egypt) Aly Abdel Aziz (third round)
12. (England) Phil Kenyon (quarter-finals)
13. (Australia) Steve Bowditch (third round)
14. (Egypt) Magdi Saad (second round)
15. (Sweden) Lars Kvant (third round)
16. (Pakistan) Fahim Gul (third round)

=== First round ===
Player One	Player Two	Score
(New Zealand) Ross Norman (7)	(England) John Le Lievre	9-4 9-5 9-3
(England) Steve Bateman	(Egypt) Mohammed Awad	3-2
(Pakistan) Fahim Gul (16)	(England) Geoff Williams	3-2
(Pakistan) Maqsood Ahmed (4)	(Australia) Ricki Hill	5-9 9-3 9-5 9-5
(Pakistan) Gogi Alauddin	(England) M. Shaw	4-9 9-1 9-4 9-5
(Pakistan) Sohail Qaiser	(England) Neil Harvey	9-3 9-2 9-4
(Australia) Steve Bowditch (13)	(Wales) Cerrig Jones	10-8 9-7 9-7
(England) Bryan Pearson	(Singapore) Zainal Abidin	9-4 1-9 9-0 9-3
(Pakistan) Qamar Zaman (3)	(England) Danny Lee	3-9 9-2 9-2 9-4
(Egypt) Moussa Helal	(Egypt) Gamal El Amir	6-9 9-6 9-3 9-4
(Sweden) Lars Kvant	(Pakistan) Abbas Khan	9-5 9-6 10-9
(England) Simon Rolington	(Sweden) Claes Eriksson	10-9 9-5 9-0
(England) John Easter	(Australia) Ken Hiscoe	9-2 7-9 9-1 9-7
(South Africa) Roland Watson	(England) M. Taylor	9-4 9-5 9-4
(Pakistan) Mohammed Ali Somjee	(England) Zain Saleh	7-9 9-3 9-3 9-0
(Egypt) Gamal Awad (5)	(Australia) Rodney George	9-2 9-7 9-2
(England) David Lloyd	(Egypt) Alam Soliman	9-6 2-9 9-4 4-9 9-4
(Australia) Chris Dittmar	(England) Ian Robinson	9-6 9-1 9-6
(Egypt) Magdi Saad (14)	(Egypt) Abbas Kaoud	9-5 9-6 5-9 9-6

=== Draw and results ===
Second round
1	(Pakistan) Jahangir Khan	9	9	9
(England) Andrew Dwyer	0	1	1
11	(Egypt) Aly Abdel Aziz	9	6	6	9	9
(Pakistan) Karimullah Khan	1	9	9	0	0
12	(England) Phil Kenyon	6	9	9	9
(Pakistan) Zahir Hussein Khan	6	2	0	5
7	(New Zealand) Ross Norman	8	9	9	9
(Australia) Frank Donnelly	10	4	5	4
8	(Australia) Glen Brumby	9	9	9
(England) Steve Bateman	3	0	5
16	(Pakistan) Fahim Gul	9	9	9
(Republic of Ireland) Robert Forde	6	4	4
4	(Pakistan) Maqsood Ahmed
(Pakistan) Gogi Alauddin
(New Zealand) Stuart Davenport	9	6	9	2	9
9	(England) Gawain Briars	7	9	6	9	5
2	(Pakistan) Hiddy Jahan
(England) John Easter
10	(South Africa) Roland Watson
(Pakistan) Mohammed Ali Somjee
5	(Egypt) Gamal Awad	9	8	9	9
(England) David Lloyd	4	10	1	0
(Australia) Chris Dittmar	9	9	8	4	9
14	(Egypt) Magdi Saad	2	7	10	9	6
6	(Australia) Dean Williams
(Pakistan) Sohail Qaiser
13	(Australia) Steve Bowditch	9	9	9
(England) Bryan Pearson	7	7	3
3	(Pakistan) Qamar Zaman
(Egypt) Moussa Helal
15	(Sweden) Lars Kvant	9	9	9
(England) Simon Rolington	6	2	2

Third round
1	(Pakistan) J Khan	9	9	9
11	(Egypt) Aziz	0	0	3
12	(England) Kenyon	9
7	(New Zealand) Norman	5	ret
8	(Australia) Brumby	9	9	9
16	(Pakistan) Fahim Gul	7	5	4
4	(Pakistan) Ahmed	9	9	9
(New Zealand) Davenport	1	7	1
2	(Pakistan) Jahan	8	10	9	7	9
10	(South Africa) Watson	10	8	4	9	0
5	(Egypt) Awad	9	9	10
(Australia) Dittmar	1	3	8
6	(Australia) Williams	9	9	5	9
13	(Australia) Bowditch	6	2	9	6
3	(Pakistan) Zaman	10	9	9
15	(Sweden) Kvant	9	5	0

Quarter finals
1	(Pakistan) J Khan	9	10	9
12	(England) Kenyon	2	7	6
8	(Australia) Brumby	9	9	9
4	(Pakistan) Ahmed	7	7	6
2	(Pakistan) Jahan	9	9	9
5	(Egypt) Awad	7	3	4
6	(Australia) Williams	6	5	9	9	9
3	(Pakistan) Zaman	9	9	1	3	2

Semi-finals
1	(Pakistan) J Khan	9	9	9
8	(Australia) Brumby	1	2	0
Final
1	(Pakistan) J Khan	9	6	9	9
6	(Australia) Williams	2	9	1	1
2	(Pakistan) Jahan	6	2	9	1
6	(Australia) Williams	9	9	0	9

=== Notes ===
The tournament was held at the NEC in Birmingham from the quarter finals stage.

== See also ==
- PSA World Open

Preceded by Toronto, Canada; 1981	World Open; Birmingham, England; 1982	Succeeded by Munich, West Germany; 1983
