= 1984 Men's World Open Squash Championship =

Squash tournament

Men's World Open 1984
- 8th PSA World Squash Championship
- Location: Karachi, Pakistan
- Date: November 28-December 3, 1984

PSA World Tour
- Category: World Open
- Prize money: $ 30,000

Results
- Champion: (Pakistan) Jahangir Khan
- Runner-up: (Pakistan) Qamar Zaman
- Semi-finalists: (Pakistan) Maqsood Ahmed (New Zealand) Ross Norman

The 1984 PSA Men's Hamdard World Open Squash Championship is the men's edition of the 1984 World Open, which serves as the individual world championship for squash players. The event took place in Karachi in Pakistan, from 28 November to 3 December 1984.

Jahangir Khan who was carrying a 44 month unbeaten record into the event, won his fourth consecutive World Open title, defeating Qamar Zaman in the final.

== Seeds ==
1. (Pakistan) Jahangir Khan (Champion)
2. (Australia) Chris Dittmar (Quarterfinals)
3. (New Zealand) Ross Norman (Semifinals)
4. (Pakistan) Qamar Zaman (Final)

=== First round ===
Player One	Player Two	Score
(Pakistan) Jahangir Khan	(Pakistan) Essa Khan	9-0 9-0 9-4
(New Zealand) Ross Norman	(England) Andrew Dwyer	9-4 9-1 9-5
(Pakistan) Sohail Qaiser	(England) Sean Flynn	9-3 9-1 9-0
(England) Phil Kenyon	(France) Patrice Chautard	9-7 9-2 9-1
(England) Geoff Williams	(Pakistan) R. Khan	9-1 9-3 9-1
(England) Jamie Hickox	(Pakistan) Ghous Ur Rehman	9-2 9-5 9-3
(England) Danny Lee	(Pakistan) F. Khan	9-5 9-0 9-1
(Australia) Greg Pollard	(Pakistan) Zakar Khan	
(England) Hiddy Jahan	(Pakistan) Karimullah Khan	9-0 9-5 9-0
(Pakistan) Fahim Gul	(England) Andrew Bennett	9-3 9-4 10-8
(Pakistan) Gogi Alauddin	(England) Richard Mosley	9-4 9-0 7-9 9-0
(England) Gawain Briars (11)	(Wales) Teifion Salisbury	9-2 9-3 9-1
(England) Martin Bodimeade	(Sweden) Leif Leiner	9-4 5-9 7-9 9-4 10-8

=== Draw & Results ===
Second round
1	(Pakistan) Jahangir Khan	9	9	9
(Pakistan) Shah Jehan Khan	2	2	3
(Australia) Ross Thorne	9	1	9	10
(Egypt) Gamal Awad	4	9	6	8
(England) Martin Bodimeade	3	1	3	9
(England) Hiddy Jahan	9	9	9
(Pakistan) Muhammad Sattar	1	0	3
(Sweden) Bosse Boström	9	9	9
3	(New Zealand) Ross Norman	9	9	9
(Pakistan) Ahmed Gul	6	0	2
(Pakistan) Sohail Qaiser	9	5	9	9
(Australia) Dean Williams	6	9	6	0
(New Zealand) Stuart Davenport	9	9	9
(Pakistan) Fahim Gul	7	0	1
(England) Phil Kenyon	6	9	9	9
(England) David Lloyd	9	4	5	0
4	(Pakistan) Qamar Zaman	9	9	10
(Pakistan) Amjad Iqbal	6	0	8
(Pakistan) Umar Hayat Khan	9	9	9
(Egypt) Magdi Saad	4	2	7
8	(Australia) Greg Pollard	10	9	9
(Pakistan) Jamshed Gul	9	5	1
(England) Danny Lee	9	9	5	6	9
11	(England) Gawain Briars	1	6	9	9	8
(Pakistan) Maqsood Ahmed	9	9	9
(Pakistan) Gogi Alauddin	5	0	2
(England) Jamie Hickox	9	3	1	9	9
(Australia) Steve Bowditch	5	9	9	4	0
2	(Australia) Chris Dittmar	9	8	9	9
(Zimbabwe) Trevor Wilkinson	6	10	1	3
(England) Geoff Williams	9	9	5	9
(Pakistan) Fahim Gul	4	3	9	4

Third round
1	(Pakistan) J Khan	9	9	9
(Australia) Thorne	1	0	0
(England) Jahan	9	2	8	9	9
(Sweden) Bosse Boström	6	9	10	2	2
3	(New Zealand) Norman	9	10	9
(Pakistan) Qaiser	2	7	8
(New Zealand) Davenport	7	9	9	9
(England) Kenyon	9	5	1	6
4	(Pakistan) Zaman	9	9	6	9
(Pakistan) U H Khan	4	7	9	6
8	(Australia) Pollard	9	9	9
(England) Lee	5	3	5
(Pakistan) Maqsood A	9	9	9
(England) Hickox	7	1	3
2	(Australia) Dittmar	9	9	9
(England) Williams G	5	4	0

Quarter-finals
1	(Pakistan) J Khan	9	9	9
(England) Jahan	0	4	1
3	(New Zealand) Norman	9	7	9	9
(New Zealand) Davenport	4	9	4	0
4	(Pakistan) Zaman	10	9	9
8	(Australia) Pollard	9	1	1
(Pakistan) Maqsood A	6	9	3	9	9
2	(Australia) Dittmar	9	3	9	3	2

Semi-finals
1	(Pakistan) J Khan	9	9	9
3	(New Zealand) Norman	2	1	1
Final
1	(Pakistan) J Khan	9	4	9
4	(Pakistan) Zaman	0	3	4
4	(Pakistan) Zaman	4	9	9	9
(Pakistan) Maqsood A	9	3	5	3

=== Note ===
Jahangir Khan took just 32 minutes to win the final watched by his father Roshan Khan, the 1957 British Open champion.
Event sponsored by Hamdard of Pakistan.

== See also ==
- PSA World Open

Preceded by West Germany (Munich); 1983	World Open; Pakistan (Karachi); 1984	Succeeded by Cairo (Egypt); 1985
