= 1986 Men's British Open Squash Championship =

British Open Squash Championships
- 48th British Open Championships

Details
- Location: London, England
- Venue: Dunnings Mill Squash Club (East Grinstead) & Wembley Conference Centre
- Dates: 14–22 April 1986

The 1986 Hi-Tec British Open Championships was held at the Dunnings Mill Squash Club in East Grinstead and the Wembley Conference Centre in London from 14–22 April 1986.
Jahangir Khan won his fifth consecutive title defeating Ross Norman in the final.

== Seeds ==
1. (Pakistan) Jahangir Khan
2. (New Zealand) Ross Norman
3. (New Zealand) Stuart Davenport
4. (England) Gawain Briars
5. (Australia) Ross Thorne
6. (Australia) Greg Pollard
7. (England) Phil Kenyon
8. (Pakistan) Qamar Zaman
9. (Australia) Glen Brumby - withdrew
10. (Pakistan) Maqsood Ahmed
11. (Pakistan) Hiddy Jahan
12. (England) Martin Bodimeade
13. (Sweden) Jan-Ulf Söderberg
14. (Australia) Ricki Hill
15. (Australia) Kelvin Smith
16. (Egypt) Gamal Awad

== Draw and results ==
=== Final ===
(Pakistan) Jahangir Khan beat (New Zealand) Ross Norman 9-6 9-4 9-6

=== Section 1 ===
First round
1	(Pakistan) Jahangir Khan	9	9	9
(England) Phil Whitlock	3	3	0
(England) Christy Willstrop	10	9	9
(Pakistan) Fahim Gul	8	3	7
13	(Sweden) Jan-Ulf Söderberg	9	9	9
(England) John Le Lievre	6	4	3
(England) David Pearson	9	9	9
(England) Jon Cornish	4	4	4
7	(England) Phil Kenyon	9	9	9
(Sweden) Bosse Boström	6	1	1
(England) Simon Taylor	9	9	9
(Egypt) Gamal El Amir	5	6	7
11	(England) Hiddy Jahan	9	9	9
(New Zealand) Stephen Cunningham	5	1	7
(South Africa) Kevin Karam	4	9	9	4	9
(Egypt) Moussa Helal	9	6	7	9	5
3	(New Zealand) Stuart Davenport	9	9	10
(Australia) Brett Martin	3	1	8
(Pakistan) Umar Hayat Khan	9	9	9
(Wales) Adrian Davies	4	5	0
15	(Australia) Kelvin Smith	9	9	9
(Australia) Frank Donnelly	0	2	5
(Canada) Dale Styner	9	8	10	9
(England) Mike Robinson	7	10	9	3
6	(Australia) Greg Pollard	9	9	1	9
(Australia) Austin Adarraga	7	7	9	7
(Sweden) Björn Almström	8	9	9	9
(Pakistan) Karimullah Khan	10	4	6	3
(Wales) Cerryg Jones	9	4	9	9
(Scotland) Mark Maclean	4	9	1	2
12	(England) Martin Bodimeade	9	9	9
(Republic of Ireland) Robert Forde	2	5	4

Second round
1	(Pakistan) Khan J	9	9	9
(England) Willstrop	1	0	1
13	(Sweden) Söderberg	9	9	9
(England) Pearson	3	2	1
7	(England) Kenyon	9	9	9
(England) Taylor	2	1	3
11	(England) Jahan	9	9	9
(South Africa) Karam	5	3	3
3	(New Zealand) Davenport	9	9	9
(Pakistan) U H Khan	7	1	2
15	(Australia) Smith	9	9	9
(Canada) Styner	4	7	7
6	(Australia) Pollard	9	3	9	10
(Sweden) Almstrom	3	9	2	8
12	(England) Bodimeade	6	9	9	9
(Wales) Jones	9	4	2	1

Third round
1	(Pakistan) Khan J	9	9	9
13	(Sweden) Söderberg	1	2	2
7	(England) Kenyon	4	7	5
11	(England) Jahan	9	9	9
3	(New Zealand) Davenport	9	9	9
15	(Australia) Smith	3	2	0
6	(New Zealand) Pollard	9	9	9	9
12	(England) Bodimeade	10	4	7	0

Quarter-finals
1	(Pakistan) Khan J	9	9	9
11	(England) Jahan	3	2	1
Semi-finals
1	(Pakistan) Khan J	9	9	9
3	(New Zealand) Davenport	0	1	2
3	(New Zealand) Davenport	2	9	9	9
6	(Australia) Pollard	9	3	5	3

=== Section 2 ===
First round
(England) Geoff Williams	4	7	9	9	9
(United States) Mark Talbott	9	9	2	0	5
16	(Egypt) Gamal Awad	9	3	9	5	9
(New Zealand) Tony Griffin	3	9	4	9	4
(England) Jamie Hickox	9	9	9
(England) Paul Carter	5	6	4
5	(Australia) Ross Thorne	9	9	5	0	9
(Canada) Gary Waite	3	0	9	9	0
(Pakistan) Mohammed Ali Somjee	9	4	9	9
(New Zealand) Tony Brett-Kelly	7	9	3	6
(Pakistan) Zarak Jahan Khan	2	7	9	9	9
10	(Pakistan) Maqsood Ahmed	9	9	4	1	3
(Australia) Michael Robberds	9	9	9
(Pakistan) Sohail Qaiser	5	5	7
4	(England) Gawain Briars	9	9	9
(Scotland) Alan Thomson	6	4	5
(Australia) Rodney Martin	9	9	9
(England) Bryan Beeson	2	0	2
14	(Australia) Ricki Hill	9	9	9
(England) Robert Owen	1	3	1
(Australia) Tristan Nancarrow	w/o
(Pakistan) Gogi Alauddin	scr
8	(Pakistan) Qamar Zaman	3	9	9	9
(Scotland) Gavin Dupre	9	1	1	2
(Singapore) Peter Hill	9	3	9	9
(Australia) Stephen Vocetti	3	9	2	4
(England) Darran Mabbs	9	1	4	9	9
(Egypt) Mohamed Awad	7	9	9	5	3
(England) Danny Lee	9	9	9
(Sweden) Leif Leiner	3	5	4
2	(New Zealand) Ross Norman	10	9	9
(England) Ashley Naylor	8	2	1

Second round
(England) Williams G	9	9	10
16	(Egypt) Awad G	0	2	8
5	(Australia) Thorne	9	9	9
(England) Hickox	5	0	1
(Pakistan) Somjee	8	9	3	1
(Pakistan) Z J Khan	10	5	9	9
(Australia) Robberds	3	5	4
4	(England) Briars	9	9	9
(Australia) Martin R	9	9	9
14	(Australia) Hill	5	5	3
(Australia) Nancarrow	9	9	9
8	(Pakistan) Zaman	0	2	0
(Singapore) Hill	9	9	9
(England) Mabbs	4	0	3
(England) Lee	2	2	2
2	(New Zealand) Norman	9	9	9

Third round
(England) Williams G	5	9	0	5
5	(Australia) Thorne	9	6	9	9
(Pakistan) Z J Khan	8	2	6
4	(England) Briars	10	9	9
(Australia) Martin R	9	9	9
(Australia) Nancarrow	7	7	5
(Singapore) Hill	3	4	0
2	(New Zealand) Norman	9	9	9

Quarter-finals
5	(Australia) Thorne	4	3	1
4	(England) Briars	9	9	9
Semi-finals
4	(England) Briars	9	2	1	5
2	(New Zealand) Norman	0	9	9	9
(Australia) Martin R	8	4	1
2	(New Zealand) Norman	10	9	9

Glen Brumby (seeded 9) withdrew before the tournament and was replaced by Mohamed Awad

Preceded by 1985	British Open Squash Championships; England (London); 1986	Succeeded by 1987
