= 1981 Men's World Open Squash Championship =

Men's World Open 1981
- 5th PSA World Squash Championship
- Location: Toronto, Canada
- Date: November 19–28, 1981

PSA World Tour
- Category: World Open

Results
- Champion: (Pakistan) Jahangir Khan
- Runner-up: (Australia) Geoff Hunt
- Semi-finalists: (Pakistan) Qamar Zaman (Pakistan) Hiddy Jahan

The 1981 McGuinness Men's World Open Squash Championship is the men's edition of the 1981 World Open, which serves as the individual world championship for squash players. The event took place in Toronto in Canada from 19 November until 28 November 1981. Jahangir Khan won his first World Open title, defeating Geoff Hunt in the final.

== Seeds ==
1. (Australia) Geoff Hunt (final)
2. (Pakistan) Jahangir Khan (champion)
3. (Pakistan) Qamar Zaman (semifinals)
4. (Pakistan) Hiddy Jahan (semifinals)
5. (Pakistan) Maqsood Ahmed (quarterfinals)
6. (Egypt) Gamal Awad (quarterfinals)
7. (South Africa) Roland Watson (third round)
8. (New Zealand) Ross Norman (second round)
9. (Australia) Dean Williams (third round)
10. (England) Gawain Briars (third round)
11. (England) Phil Kenyon (third round)
12. (Sweden) Lars Kvant (third round)
13. (Australia) Steve Bowditch (first round)
14. (Egypt) Aly Abdel Aziz (quarterfinals)
15. (Australia) Glen Brumby (third round)
16. (Egypt) Ahmed Safwat (quarterfinals)

=== First round ===
Player One	Player Two	Score
(Australia) Geoff Hunt (1)	(Canada) Marc Lalonde	9-5 9-0 9-1
(Pakistan) Qamar Zaman (3)	(England) Simon Rolington	9-0 9-1 9-3
(New Zealand) Ross Norman (8)	(New Zealand) Chris Caird	9-3 9-1 9-1
(England) Gawain Briars (10)	(New Zealand) Brian Barnett	4-9 9-7 9-7 9-4
(England) Phil Kenyon (11)	(Pakistan) Sohail Qaiser	9-3 9-5 9-3
(Sweden) Lars Kvant (12)	(England) Mike Way	9-0 9-2 9-3
(Australia) Ricki Hill	(Australia) Steve Bowditch (13)	9-3 9-2 9-5
(Australia) Glen Brumby (15)	(England) Steve Bateman	9-1 9-2 9-6
(Egypt) Ahmed Safwat (16)	(Nigeria) Mark M'Fuk	10-8 9-2 7-9 9-7
(England) Ian Robinson	(Zimbabwe) Bob Shay	8-10 9-2 9-4 9-7
(Australia) Ross Thorne	(England) Geoff Williams	9-0 9-0 9-3
(Egypt) Mo Asran	(New Zealand) Howard Broun	9-6 10-8 9-5
(Australia) Chris Dittmar	(Egypt) Alam Soliman	9-1 10-9 9-5
(England) Andrew Dwyer	(Pakistan) Mo Yasin	6-9 9-5 9-4 2-9 9-2
(Egypt) Moussa Helal	(Canada) Sharif Khan	9-4 9-3 9-6
(Pakistan) Zahir Hussein Khan	(England) Sean Flynn	9-0 9-3 9-2
(New Zealand) Robin Espie	(England) Ashley Naylor	9-4 9-5 9-7
(Australia) Frank Donnelly	(England) Bob Greaves	9-1 9-7 9-4
(Sweden) Leif Leiner	(England) Richard Mosley	9-7 9-3 9-8

=== Main Draw ===
Second round
1	(Australia) Geoff Hunt	w/o
(Australia) Ross Thorne	scr
(England) Ian Robinson	4	6	9	9	9
(Australia) Ricki Hill	9	9	5	0	1
5	(Pakistan) Maqsood Ahmed	6	9	9	4	9
(England) Andrew Dwyer	9	5	3	9	3
10	(England) Gawain Briars	9	9	9	9
(New Zealand) Robin Espie	4	10	5	4
3	(Pakistan) Qamar Zaman	9	9	9
(Australia) Chris Dittmar	0	2	6
15	(Australia) Glen Brumby	9	9	9
(Australia) Frank Donnelly	7	4	0
16	(Egypt) Ahmed Safwat	3	5	9	9	9
(Sweden) Leif Leiner	9	9	1	0	0
8	(New Zealand) Ross Norman	6	9	9	9
(Egypt) Moussa Helal	9	1	2	2
2	(Pakistan) Jahangir Khan	9	9	5	9
(Egypt) Mohamed Asran	2	4	9	2
9	(Australia) Dean Williams	9	9	9
(Pakistan) Zahir Hussein Khan	2	3	1
6	(Egypt) Gamal Awad	9	9	4	9
(Guernsey) John Le Lievre	2	0	9	1
12	(Sweden) Lars Kvant	w/o
(Canada) Aziz Khan	scr
4	(Pakistan) Hiddy Jahan	9	9	6	9
(Pakistan) Karimullah Khan	4	5	9	5
11	(England) Phil Kenyon	9	9	4	5	9
(New Zealand) Murray Lilley	7	4	9	9	2
14	(Egypt) Aly Abdel Aziz	10	9	10
(Pakistan) Gogi Alauddin	9	3	8
7	(South Africa) Roland Watson	10	9	3	9
(Sweden) Johan Stockenberg	8	0	9	2

Third round
1	(Australia) Hunt	9	9	9
(England) Robinson	2	5	6
5	(Pakistan) Ahmed	9	10	9
10	(England) Briars	4	7	5
3	(Pakistan) Zaman	9	9	9
15	(Australia) Brumby	1	2	7
16	(Egypt) Safwat	9	10	9
8	(New Zealand) Norman	6	8	1
2	(Pakistan) Jahangir	9	9	9
9	(Australia) Williams	1	2	2
6	(Egypt) Awad	9	9	9
12	(Sweden) Kvant	2	1	1
4	(Pakistan) Jahan	9	9	9	9
11	(England) Kenyon	3	4	10	5
14	(Egypt) Aziz	w/o
7	(South Africa) Watson	scr

Quarter-finals
1	(Australia) Hunt	9	9	9
5	(Pakistan) Ahmed	0	4	1
3	(Pakistan) Zaman	10	9	9
16	(Egypt) Safwat	5	2	4
2	(Pakistan) Jahangir	9	8	9	9
6	(Egypt) Awad	6	10	5	1
4	(Pakistan) Jahan	7	9	9	9
14	(Egypt) Aziz	9	4	0	2

Semi-finals
1	(Australia) Hunt	9	7	9	9
3	(Pakistan) Zaman	5	9	2	3
Final
1	(Australia) Hunt	9	1	2	1
2	(Pakistan) Jahangir	7	9	9	9
2	(Pakistan) Jahangir	9	9	9
4	(Pakistan) Jahan	3	3	3

=== Notes ===
Geoff Hunt was defeated for the first time in the World Open, every edition of the event which had been inaugurated in 1976 had been won by Geoff Hunt previously.

== See also ==
- PSA World Open
- 1981 Women's World Open Squash Championship

Preceded by Australia (Adelaide); 1980	World Open; Canada (Toronto); 1981	Succeeded by Birmingham (England); 1982
