= 1985 Men's World Open Squash Championship =

Squash event

Men's World Open 1985
- 9th PSA World Squash Championship
- Location: Cairo, Egypt
- Date: November 18–25, 1985

PSA World Tour
- Category: World Open
- Prize money: $ 50,000

Results
- Champion: (Pakistan) Jahangir Khan
- Runner-up: (New Zealand) Ross Norman
- Semi-finalists: (Australia) Glen Brumby (England) Gawain Briars

The 1985 PSA Men's World Open Squash Championship is the men's edition of the 1985 World Open, which serves as the individual world championship for squash players. The event took place in Cairo in Egypt from 18 November to 25 November 1985.

Jahangir Khan won his fifth consecutive World Open title, defeating Ross Norman in the final.

== Seeds ==
1. (Pakistan) Jahangir Khan (champion)
2. (New Zealand) Ross Norman (final)
3. (New Zealand) Stuart Davenport (second round)
4. (Australia) Dean Williams (quarterfinals)
5. (Pakistan) Qamar Zaman (second round)

== Draw and results ==
First round
1	(Pakistan) Jahangir Khan	9	9	9
(England) Martin Bodimeade	5	5	6
(Pakistan) Sohail Qaiser	6	9	9	9
(Sweden) Jan-Ulf Söderberg	9	6	5	6
10	(Australia) Ross Thorne	9	9	9	9
(Egypt) Mohammed Awad	9	1	1	0
(England) Phil Kenyon	6	9	9	9
(England) Jamie Hickox	9	3	4	2
(Australia) Glen Brumby	9	9	9
(United States) Mark Talbott	3	2	0
(Australia) Greg Pollard	10	4	9	9	9
(Egypt) Gamal el-Amir	8	9	0	10	6
4	(Australia) Dean Williams	9	9	9
(Pakistan) Maqsood Ahmed	6	1	3
(Australia) Ricki Hill	7	9	9	9
(Scotland) Mark Maclean	9	5	6	4
2	(New Zealand) Ross Norman	7	7	9	9	9
(Australia) Steve Bowditch	9	9	1	1	3
(Australia) Kelvin Smith	9	9	9
(Pakistan) Jansher Khan	4	5	2
(Pakistan) Umar Hayat Khan	9	9	9
(Egypt) Atef Khalifa	6	3	2
5	(Pakistan) Qamar Zaman	9	9	9
(United States) Ned Edwards	0	4	5
7	(England) Gawain Briars	9	9	9
(Egypt) Nasser Zahran	2	1	4
(England) Hiddy Jahan	9	9	9
(Sweden) Anders Wahlstedt	3	7	7
(Egypt) Magdi Saad	10	9	9
(England) Danny Lee	8	1	4
3	(New Zealand) Stuart Davenport	9	9	9
(Netherlands) Ric Zandvliet	6	2	7

Second round
1	(Pakistan) Jahangir Khan	9	9	9
(Pakistan) Sohail Qaiser	2	4	2
10	(Australia) Ross Thorne	9	9	9
(England) Phil Kenyon	5	0	3
(Australia) Glen Brumby	9	9	9	9
(Australia) Greg Pollard	2	10	3	5
4	(Australia) Dean Williams	9	10	9
(Australia) Ricki Hill	1	8	4
2	(New Zealand) Ross Norman	9	9	9
(Australia) Kelvin Smith	2	2	5
(Pakistan) Umar Hayat Khan	9	9	0	9
5	(Pakistan) Qamar Zaman	4	3	9	5
7	(England) Gawain Briars	9	9	10
(England) Hiddy Jahan	6	4	8
(Egypt) Magdi Saad	9	9	9	9
3	(New Zealand) Stuart Davenport	4	3	10	6

Quarter-finals
1	(Pakistan) Jahangir Khan	9	9	9
10	(Australia) Ross Thorne	2	2	5
(Australia) Glen Brumby	6	9	9	9
4	(Australia) Dean Williams	9	6	1	0
2	(New Zealand) Ross Norman	9	9	9
(Pakistan) Umar Hayat Khan	1	3	1
7	(England) Gawain Briars	9	9	2	9
(Egypt) Magdi Saad	4	3	9	2

Semi-finals
1	(Pakistan) Jahangir Khan	9	9	9
(Australia) Glen Brumby	2	0	7
Final
1	(Pakistan) Jahangir Khan	9	4	9	9
2	(New Zealand) Ross Norman	4	9	5	1
2	(New Zealand) Ross Norman	9	9	9
7	(England) Gawain Briars	6	2	2

=== Notes ===
The 1985 championships saw controversy when many courts had not been prepared properly and this caused players to slip. This nearly led to Jahangir Khan withdrawing during his first round match.

== See also ==
- PSA World Open
- 1985 Women's World Open Squash Championship

Preceded by Pakistan (Karachi); 1984	World Open; Egypt (Cairo); 1985	Succeeded by Toulouse (France); 1986
