= 1986 Men's World Open Squash Championship =

Squash tournament

Men's World Open 1986
- 10th PSA World Squash Championship
- Location: Toulouse, France
- Date: November 5–11, 1986

PSA World Tour
- Category: World Open
- Prize money: $ 55,000

Results
- Champion: (New Zealand) Ross Norman
- Runner-up: (Pakistan) Jahangir Khan
- Semi-finalists: (Australia) Chris Dittmar (Australia) Chris Robertson

The 1986 UAP Men's World Open Squash Championship is the men's edition of the 1986 World Open, which serves as the individual world championship for squash players. The event took place in Toulouse in France from 5 November to 11 November 1986.

Ross Norman won his first World Open title, defeating Jahangir Khan in the final.Norman won 9–5, 9–7, 7–9, 9–1 to end Jahangir's unbeaten streak dating back to 1981. The win marked the end of an unbeaten run for Khan that had stretched for over five years.

== Seeds ==
1. (Pakistan) Jahangir Khan (final)
2. (New Zealand) Ross Norman (champion)
3. (New Zealand) Stuart Davenport (quarterfinals)
4. (Australia) Ross Thorne (quarterfinals)
5. (England) Phil Kenyon (second round)
6. (England) Gawain Briars (quarterfinals)
7. (Pakistan) Qamar Zaman (second round)
8. (Australia) Greg Pollard (second round)

== Draw and results ==
Second round
1	(Pakistan) Jahangir Khan	9	9	9
(England) Jamie Hickox	1	4	2
(Pakistan) Maqsood Ahmed	9	9	9
(Egypt) Gamal El Amir	5	3	5
(Sweden) Jan-Ulf Söderberg	8	9	9	3	9
(Australia) Brett Martin	10	2	5	9	2
(South Africa) Paul Symonds	6	8	9	9	9
8	(Australia) Greg Pollard	9	10	2	7	3
(Australia) Chris Dittmar	9	3	9	9
(England) Geoff Williams	1	9	5	6
(England) Hiddy Jahan	4	9	9	9
(Pakistan) Sohail Qaiser	9	2	5	6
4	(Australia) Ross Thorne	9	9	1	4	9
(England) Bryan Beeson	7	4	9	9	7
(England) Danny Lee	9	9	9
7	(Pakistan) Qamar Zaman	7	5	1
3	(New Zealand) Stuart Davenport	9	6	9	9
(Sweden) Anders Wahlstedt	7	9	4	2
(England) Martin Bodimeade	9	9	9
(Australia) Ricki Hill	2	6	2
(Australia) Chris Robertson	3	9	9	9
(Pakistan) Umar Hayat Khan	9	3	2	7
(Pakistan) Jansher Khan	10	7	9	10
5	(England) Phil Kenyon	9	9	3	8
2	(New Zealand) Ross Norman	10	9	9
(Egypt) Gamal Awad	8	0	1
(Australia) Tristan Nancarrow	9	9	9
(Scotland) Stuart Hailstone	0	7	7
6	(England) Gawain Briars	9	9
(England) Robert Graham	7	4	5
(Pakistan) Zarak Jahan Khan	9	9	6	9
(Sweden) Fredrik Johnson	2	6	9	2

Third round
1	(Pakistan) Jahangir	9	9	9
(Pakistan) Ahmed	5	1	5
(Sweden) Söderberg	9	3	9	9
(South Africa) Symonds	4	9	1	2
(Australia) Dittmar	9	9	3	9
(England) Jahan	3	4	9	4
4	(Australia) Thorne	9	9	9
(England) Lee	7	6	1
3	(New Zealand) Davenport	10	9	9
(England) Bodimeade	8	2	3
(Australia) Robertson	10	9	9
(Pakistan) Jansher	8	5	3
2	(New Zealand) Norman	9	9	9
(Australia) Nancarrow	4	2	3
6	(England) Briars	8	7	10	9	9
(Pakistan) Z J Khan	10	9	8	3	1

Quarter-finals
1	(Pakistan) Jahangir	9	9	9
(Sweden) Söderberg	0	1	1
(Australia) Dittmar	9	9	9
4	(Australia) Thorne	2	1	7
3	(Australia) Davenport	6	2	1
(Australia) Robertson	9	9	9
2	(New Zealand) Norman	9	9	9
6	(England) Briars	4	7	7

Semi-finals
1	(Pakistan) Jahangir	9	9	3	9
(Australia) Dittmar	3	5	9	1
Final
1	(Pakistan) Jahangir	5	7	9	1
2	(New Zealand) Norman	9	9	7	9
(Australia) Robertson	8	9	5	2
2	(New Zealand) Norman	10	6	9	9

=== Note ===
Jahangir Khan suffered defeat in the World Open for the first time since 1980. The world number one had previously won five consecutive world titles.

== See also ==
- PSA World Open

Preceded by Egypt (Cairo); 1985	World Open; France (Toulouse); 1986	Succeeded by Birmingham (England); 1987
