= 1985 Men's World Team Squash Championships =

Men's World Team 1985
- 10th World Men's Team Championship
- Location: Egypt
- Date: November 27 - December 05, 1985

Results
- Champions: Pakistan
- Runners-up: New Zealand
- Third place: Australia

The 1985 Men's World Team Squash Championships were held in Cairo, Egypt and took place from November 27 until December 05, 1985. Pakistan became the champion, after defeating New Zealand 2-1 in the finals.

== Seeds ==
1. England
2. Australia
3. New Zealand
4. Pakistan

== Results ==
=== Pool 1 ===
| Team one | Team two | Score |
|---|---|---|
| England | Singapore | 3-0 |
| England | United States | 2-1 |
| England | France | 3-0 |
| England | Kuwait | 3-0 |
| Singapore | United States | 3-0 |
| Singapore | France | 3-0 |
| Singapore | Kuwait | 3-0 |
| United States | France | 2-1 |
| United States | Kuwait | 3-0 |
| France | Kuwait | 3-0 |

| Pos | Nation | Team | P | W | L | Pts |
|---|---|---|---|---|---|---|
| 1 | England | Gawain Briars, Phil Kenyon, Hiddy Jahan, Jamie Hickox | 4 | 4 | 0 | 8 |
| 2 | Singapore | Peter Hill, Zainal Abidin, Alex Tay, Anthony Chua | 4 | 3 | 1 | 6 |
| 3 | United States | Ned Edwards, John Nimick, Mark Talbott, Azam Khan | 4 | 2 | 2 | 4 |
| 4 | France | Philippe Signoret, Frédéric Canot, Michaël Palmstierna, Eric Claudel | 4 | 1 | 3 | 2 |
| 5 | Kuwait | Mahmoud Al-Jazzaf, Tareq Al-Owayesh, Esam Al-Modaf | 4 | 0 | 4 | 0 |

=== Pool 2 ===
| Team one | Team two | Score |
|---|---|---|
| Australia | Canada | 3-0 |
| Australia | Finland | 3-0 |
| Australia | Greece | 3-0 |
| Australia | Malaysia | 3-0 |
| Canada | Finland | 2-1 |
| Canada | Greece | 3-0 |
| Canada | Malaysia | 3-0 |
| Finland | Greece | 3-0 |
| Finland | Malaysia | 3-0 |
| Greece | Malaysia | 3-0 |

| Pos | Nation | Team | P | W | L | Pts |
|---|---|---|---|---|---|---|
| 1 | Australia | Dean Williams, Greg Pollard, Glen Brumby, Ross Thorne | 4 | 4 | 0 | 8 |
| 2 | Canada | Steve Lawton, Dale Styner, Gary Waite, Jamie Crombie | 4 | 3 | 1 | 6 |
| 3 | Finland | Sami Elopuro, Markku Sainio, Kale Leskinen, Matti Saarela | 4 | 2 | 2 | 4 |
| 4 | Greece | Nikos Moustroufis, Panagiotis Vasiliou, Nicos Kouremenos | 4 | 1 | 3 | 2 |
| 5 | Malaysia | Singaraveloo Maniam, Read Lan, Sam Lan Chong | 4 | 0 | 4 | 0 |

=== Pool 3 ===
| Team one | Team two | Score |
|---|---|---|
| New Zealand | Egypt | 2-1 |
| New Zealand | Netherlands | 3-0 |
| New Zealand | (Republic of Ireland) Ireland | 3-0 |
| New Zealand | Monaco | 3-0 |
| Egypt | Netherlands | 3-0 |
| Egypt | (Republic of Ireland) Ireland | 2-1 |
| Egypt | Monaco | 3-0 |
| Netherlands | (Republic of Ireland) Ireland | 2-1 |
| Netherlands | Monaco | 3-0 |
| (Republic of Ireland) Ireland | Monaco | 3-0 |

| Pos | Nation | Team | P | W | L | Pts |
|---|---|---|---|---|---|---|
| 1 | New Zealand | Stuart Davenport, Ross Norman, Paul Viggers, Anthony McMurtrie | 4 | 4 | 0 | 8 |
| 2 | Egypt | Ahmed Safwat, Gamal Awad, Magdi Saad, Gamal El Amir | 4 | 3 | 1 | 6 |
| 3 | Netherlands | Ric Zandvliet, Hans Frieling, Eric van der Pluijm | 4 | 2 | 2 | 4 |
| 4 | (Republic of Ireland) Ireland | David Gotto, Robert Forde, John McKay | 4 | 1 | 3 | 2 |
| 5 | Monaco | L South, H Smith, Xavier Notari | 4 | 0 | 4 | 0 |

=== Pool 4 ===
| Team one | Team two | Score |
|---|---|---|
| Pakistan | West Germany | 3-0 |
| Pakistan | Sweden | 3-0 |
| Pakistan | Scotland | 3-0 |
| Pakistan | Spain | 3-0 |
| West Germany | Sweden | 2-1 |
| West Germany | Scotland | 2-1 |
| West Germany | Spain | 3-0 |
| Sweden | Scotland | 3-0 |
| Sweden | Spain | 3-0 |
| Scotland | Spain | 3-0 |

| Pos | Nation | Team | P | W | L | Pts |
|---|---|---|---|---|---|---|
| 1 | Pakistan | Jahangir Khan, Umar Hayat Khan, Sohail Qaiser | 4 | 4 | 0 | 8 |
| 2 | West Germany | Michael Ehlers, Carol Martini, Ralf Schuldt | 4 | 3 | 1 | 6 |
| 3 | Sweden | Jan-Ulf Söderberg, Fredrik Johnson, Anders Wahlstedt, Jonas Gornerup | 4 | 2 | 2 | 4 |
| 4 | Scotland | Mark Maclean, Chris McManus, Alan Thomson, Frank Ellis | 4 | 1 | 3 | 2 |
| 5 | Spain | Pedro Riviere, Jose Luis De La Guardia, Santiago Nieto | 4 | 0 | 4 | 0 |

=== Final Group A ===
| Team one | Team two | Score |
|---|---|---|
| New Zealand | England | 2-1 |
| New Zealand | West Germany | 3-0 |
| New Zealand | Canada | 3-0 |
| England | West Germany | 3-0 |
| England | Canada | 3-0 |
| Canada | West Germany | 3-0 |

| Pos | Nation | P | W | L | Pts |
|---|---|---|---|---|---|
| 1 | New Zealand | 3 | 3 | 0 | 6 |
| 2 | England | 3 | 2 | 1 | 4 |
| 3 | Canada | 3 | 1 | 2 | 2 |
| 4 | West Germany | 3 | 0 | 3 | 0 |

=== Final Group B ===
| Team one | Team two | Score |
|---|---|---|
| Pakistan | Egypt | 3-0 |
| Pakistan | Australia | 2-1 |
| Pakistan | Singapore | 3-0 |
| Australia | Singapore | 3-0 |
| Australia | Egypt | 3-0 |
| Egypt | Singapore | 1-2 |

| Pos | Nation | P | W | L | Pts |
|---|---|---|---|---|---|
| 1 | Pakistan | 3 | 3 | 0 | 6 |
| 2 | Australia | 3 | 2 | 1 | 4 |
| 3 | Singapore | 3 | 1 | 2 | 2 |
| 4 | Egypt | 3 | 0 | 3 | 0 |

=== Semi-finals ===
| Team one | Team two | Score |
|---|---|---|
| New Zealand | Australia | 2-1 |
| Pakistan | England | 3-0 |

=== Third Place Play Off ===
| Team one | Team two | Score |
|---|---|---|
| Australia | England | 2-1 |

=== Final ===
Pakistan
2
FINAL
Cairo, Egypt
05 December 1985

New Zealand
1

| | | | 1 | 2 | 3 | 4 | 5 |
|---|---|---|---|---|---|---|---|
| 1 | (Pakistan) (New Zealand) | Umar Hayat Khan; Stuart Davenport | 0; 9 | 4; 9 | 9; 7 | 2; 9 |
| 2 | (Pakistan) (New Zealand) | Jahangir Khan; Ross Norman | 9; 1 | 9; 3 | 9; 2 |
| 3 | (Pakistan) (New Zealand) | Sohail Qaiser; Paul Viggers | 9; 4 | 9; 2 | 9; 6 |

| Preceded by New Zealand; 1983 | Squash World Team; Egypt; 1985 | Succeeded by England; 1987 |

== See also ==
- World Team Squash Championships
- World Squash Federation
- World Open (squash)
