= 1987 Men's British Open Squash Championship =

British Open Squash Championships
- 49th British Open Championships

Details
- Location: London, England
- Venue: South Bank Squash Club and Wembley Conference Centre
- Dates: 4–14 April 1987

The 1987 Hi-Tec British Open Championships was held at the South Bank Squash Club with the later stages being held at the Wembley Conference Centre from 4–14 April 1987. Jahangir Khan won his sixth consecutive title defeating Jansher Khan in the final 9-6 9-0 9-5. Eight times champion Geoff Hunt made a comeback after a five-year absence.

== Seeds ==
1. (Pakistan) Jahangir Khan
2. (New Zealand) Ross Norman
3. (New Zealand) Stuart Davenport
4. (England) Phil Kenyon
5. (England) Gawain Briars
6. (England) Hiddy Jahan
7. (Australia) Chris Robertson
8. (Australia) Chris Dittmar
9. Geoff Williams
10. (Australia) Tristan Nancarrow
11. (Pakistan) Jansher Khan
12. (England) Martin Bodimeade
13. Bryan Beeson
14. (Australia) Rodney Martin
15. (Sweden) Jan-Ulf Söderberg
16. (Pakistan) Maqsood Ahmed

=== Final ===
(Pakistan) Jahangir Khan beat (Pakistan) Jansher Khan 9-6 9-0 9-5

=== Section 1 ===
First round
1	(Pakistan) Jahangir Khan	9	9	9
(Australia) Michael Robberds	4	0	0
(England) Paul Gregory	9	10	9
(New Zealand) Rory Watt	2	8	6
10	(Australia) Tristan Nancarrow	9	5	9	9
(England) Chris Walker	6	9	4	2
(Australia) Geoff Hunt	6	9	4	9	9
(Sweden) Jonas Gornerup	9	5	9	6	0
7	(Australia) Chris Robertson	6	9
(Canada) Sabir Butt	9	2
(England) Del Harris	9	9	9
(South Africa) Kevin Karam	4	1	6
16	(Pakistan) Maqsood Ahmed	7	9	9	9
(England) Zain Saleh	9	4	2	5
(Canada) Gary Waite	9	9	6	9
(England) Paul Carter	2	2	9	2
14	(Australia) Rodney Martin	9	9	9
(England) Paul Millington	7	3	4
(Egypt) Gamal El Amir	10	9	3	9
(Finland) Matti Saarela	8	2	9	2
(Sweden) Björn Almström	9	0	9	9
(Pakistan) Mir Zaman Gul	2	9	5	5
(England) Nigel Stiles	9	9	9
(England) Hiddy Jahan	5	4	7
3	(New Zealand) Stuart Davenport	9	9	9
(Republic of Ireland) Robert Forde	7	6	4
(Wales) Cerryg Jones	9	9	9
(Sweden) Bosse Boström	0	1	3
(England) Neil Harvey	9	9	9
(South Africa) Paul Symonds	7	3	0
12	(England) Martin Bodimeade	5	9	9	9
(England) Robert Owen	9	4	4	3

Second round
1	(Pakistan) J Khan	9	9	9
(England) Gregory	1	0	1
10	(Australia) Nancarrow	9	9	9
(Australia) Hunt	8	3	1
7	(Australia) Robertson	9	9	1	9
(England) Harris	3	1	9	6
16	(Pakistan) Maqsood A	2	9	9	2	9
(Canada) Waite	9	4	1	9	1
14	(Australia) R Martin	9	9	9
(Egypt) El Amir	6	2	8
(Sweden) Almstrom	7	9	9	9
(England) Stiles	9	5	5	3
3	(New Zealand) Davenport	9	9	9
(Wales) Jones	6	5	0
(England) Harvey	5	9	9	1	9
12	(England) Bodimeade	9	4	7	9	0

Third round
1	(Pakistan) J Khan	9	9	4	9
10	(Australia) Nancarrow	3	2	9	1
7	(Australia) Robertson	9	9	9
16	(Pakistan) Maqsood A	1	0	7
14	(Australia) R Martin	9	9	9	9
(Sweden) Almstrom	9	1	1	9
6	(New Zealand) Davenport	9	9	9
(England) Harvey	4	5	0

Quarter-finals
1	(Pakistan) J Khan	9	9	9
7	(Australia) Robertson	4	3	3
Semi-finals
1	(Pakistan) J Khan	7	8	9	9	9
14	(Australia) R Martin	9	10	6	4	0
14	(Australia) R Martin	10	8	7	9	9
3	(New Zealand) Davenport	8	10	9	6	0

=== Section 2 ===
First round
11	(Pakistan) Jansher Khan	9	9	9
(Australia) Rodney Eyles	4	0	3
(Pakistan) Zarak Jahan Khan	9	9	9
(New Zealand) Stephen Cunningham	5	4	5
5	(England) Gawain Briars	9	9	9	9
(England) Christy Willstrop	1	0	10	1
(Singapore) Peter Hill	9	9	9
(Egypt) Nasser Zahran	7	2	2
2	(New Zealand) Ross Norman	9	9	9
(Australia) Philip Trueman	1	6	5
(England) Jason Nicolle	8	9	9	9
(Australia) Austin Adarraga	10	3	7	1
(England) Geoff Williams	9	9	9
(Pakistan) Khadim Khan	4	4	6
(Wales) Adrian Davies	9	7	9	10
(Pakistan) Umar Hayat Khan	3	9	5	8
8	(Australia) Chris Dittmar	9	9	9
(Netherlands) Ric Zandvliet	2	0	5
(England) John Ransome	9	9	7	9
(Pakistan) Sohail Qaiser	2	4	9	5
(Egypt) Gamal Awad	9	9	9	9
(Australia) Brett Newton	10	7	7	4
15	(Sweden) Jan-Ulf Söderberg	8	9	9	9
(Australia) Brett Martin	10	0	5	5
4	(England) Phil Kenyon	2	9	6	9	9
(Australia) Stephen Vocetti	9	3	9	2	2
(Scotland) Mark Maclean	2	9	9	9
(England) Danny Meddings	9	5	0	0
(England) Bryan Beeson	9	9	9
(Pakistan) Zahir Hussein Khan	6	0	4
(England) Mike Robinson	9	10	9
(England) Grant Miller	4	8	0

Second round
11	(Pakistan) Jansher K
(Pakistan) Z J Khan
5	(England) Briars
(Singapore) Hill
2	(New Zealand) Norman	9	6	9	9
(England) Nicolle	6	9	3	2
(England) Williams G
(Wales) Davies
8	(Australia) Dittmar	9	9	9
(England) Ransome	2	1	1
(Egypt) Awad	9	3	9	5	9
15	(Sweden) Söderberg	7	3	4	9	7
4	(England) Kenyon	9	9	9
(Scotland) Maclean	6	3	0
(England) Beeson	9	9	3	9
(England) Robinson	2	0	9	7

Third round
11	(Pakistan) Jansher K	9	9	8	9	9
5	(England) Briars	3	0	10	10	5
2	(New Zealand) Norman	9	9	9
(England) Williams	6	5	3
8	(Australia) Dittmar
(Egypt) Awad
4	(England) Kenyon	2	9	4	9	9
(England) Beeson	9	7	9	1	3

Quarter-finals
11	(Pakistan) Jansher K	9	2	5	9	9
2	(Australia) Norman	7	9	9	3	6
Semi-finals
11	(Pakistan) Jansher K	9	4	9	4	9
8	(Australia) Dittmar	4	9	5	9	5
8	(Australia) Dittmar	9	9	9
4	(England) Kenyon	0	1	1

Preceded by 1986	British Open Squash Championships; England (London); 1987	Succeeded by 1988
