= 1985 Men's British Open Squash Championship =

British Open Squash Championships
- 47th British Open Championships

Details
- Location: London, England
- Venue: Dunnings Mills Squash Club, East Grinstead and Wembley Conference Centre
- Dates: 15–23 April 1985

The 1985 Davies and Tate British Open Championships was held at the Dunnings Mills Squash Club, East Grinstead, with the later stages being held at the Wembley Conference Centre from 15 to 23 April 1985.
Jahangir Khan won his fourth consecutive title defeating Chris Dittmar in the final.

== Seeds ==
1. (Pakistan) Jahangir Khan
2. (Pakistan) Qamar Zaman
3. (New Zealand) Ross Norman
4. (Australia) Chris Dittmar
5. (Australia) Greg Pollard - withdrew
6. (New Zealand) Stuart Davenport
7. (Australia) Ross Thorne
8. (Egypt) Gamal Awad
(Australia) Ricki Hill - seed 13

== Draw and results ==
=== Final ===
(Pakistan) Jahangir Khan beat (Australia) Chris Dittmar 9-3 9-2 9–5

=== Section 1 ===
First round
1	(Pakistan) Jahangir Khan	9	9	9
(South Africa) Richard O'Connor	3	0	1
(Egypt) Ahmed Safwat	9	9	9
(Pakistan) Khadim Khan	6	4	4
(England) Bryan Beeson	5	7	8	10	9
(Egypt) Nasser Zahran	9	9	5	8	7
(Australia) Frank Donnelly	w/o
13	(Australia) Ricki Hill	scr
8	(Egypt) Gamal Awad	9	2	1	9	9
(South Africa) Paul Symonds	5	9	9	3	3
(Egypt) Gamal El Amir	3	9	9	9
(England) Martin Bodimeade	9	7	4	6
(Pakistan) Maqsood Ahmed	9	7	9	9
(Wales) Cerryg Jones	3	9	7	8
(Canada) Dale Styner	9	3	10	9
(Egypt) Aly Abdel Aziz	1	9	8	2
6	(New Zealand) Stuart Davenport	9	7	9	9
(England) John Le Lievre	4	9	1	4
(England) Ashley Naylor	9	7	9	9
(Sweden) Jonas Gornerup	3	9	3	2
(England) Gawain Briars	9	9	9
(England) Simon Rolington	2	0	2
(Pakistan) Sohail Qaiser	5	1	9	10	9
(England) Barry Watkins	9	9	4	8	1
3	(New Zealand) Ross Norman	9	9	9
(Pakistan) Mohammed Ali Somjee	0	3	1
(Pakistan) Umar Hayat Khan	9	9
(England) Cristy Willstrop	7	2
(England) Geoff Williams	8	10	9	9
(Egypt) Moussa Helal	10	8	2	4
(England) David Pearson	9	9	9
(Wales) Adrian Davies	5	0	4

Second round
1	(Pakistan) Jahangir Khan	9	9	9
(Egypt) Safwat	1	0	0
(England) Beeson	9	9	9
(Australia) Donnelly	0	6	0
8	(Egypt) Awad	9	10	9
(Egypt) El Amir	6	9	4
(Pakistan) Maqsood A	9	10	9
(Canada) Styner	5	8	7
6	(New Zealand) Davenport	9	9	9	9
(England) Naylor	6	2	10	8
(England) Briars	9	9	9
(Pakistan) Qaiser	3	4	2
3	(New Zealand) Norman	9	9	9
(Pakistan) U H Khan	3	1	1
(England) Williams G	9	6	9	9
(England) Pearson	1	2	10	8

Third round
1	(Pakistan) Jahangir Khan	9	9	9
(England) Beeson	0	0	1
8	(Egypt) Awad	10	6	9	9
(Pakistan) Maqsood A	8	9	2	0
6	(New Zealand) Davenport	9	9	9	9
(England) Briars	10	6	4	2
3	(New Zealand) Norman	6	9	9	9
(England) Williams G	9	6	3	2

Quarter-finals
1	(Pakistan) Jahangir Khan	9	9	9
8	(Egypt) Awad	0	1	2
Semi-finals
1	(Pakistan) Jahangir Khan	7	9	9	9
6	(New Zealand) Davenport	9	1	5	0
6	(New Zealand) Davenport	5	9	10	9
3	(New Zealand) Norman	9	7	8	4

=== Section 2 ===
First round
2	(Pakistan) Qamar Zaman	8	9	9	9	9
(Sweden) Leif Leiner	10	10	0	0	2
(England) Ian Robinson	2	9	9	9
(Pakistan) Fahim Gul	9	6	3	0
(Egypt) Magdi Saad	9	9	10
(Sweden) Björn Almström	3	6	9
(England) Danny Lee	10	10	9
(Pakistan) Gogi Alauddin	9	8	1
(England) Phil Kenyon	9	0	9	9
(Egypt) Hesham El Attar	5	9	5	3
7	(Australia) Ross Thorne	9	9	9
(England) Rob Shay	3	2	2
(Sweden) Fredrik Johnson	1	7	9	10	9
(Australia) Stephen Vocetti	9	9	1	9	1
(England) Hiddy Jahan	9	9	9
(England) Simon Taylor	0	0	2
(England) David Lloyd	9	9	9
(England) Steve Bateman	4	4	2
(Sweden) Jan-Ulf Soderberg	9	9	9
(Sweden) Bosse Boström	4	6	4
(Pakistan) Karimullah Khan	9	9	9
(Australia) Patrick Coll	2	7	1
(South Africa) Stuart Hailstone	9	9	2	3	6
(England) Andrew Foley	5	3	9	9	5 ret
4	(Australia) Chris Dittmar	9	9	9
(Pakistan) Daulat Khan	3	1	3
(England) Neil Harvey	9	1	4	9	9
(England) Jamie Hickox	2	9	9	6	1
(Australia) Kelvin Smith	9	9	2	9
(Republic of Ireland) Robert Forde	0	3	9	3
(Singapore) Peter Hill	9	10	9
(Australia) Tristan Nancarrow	2	8	4

Second round
2	(Pakistan) Zaman	9	9	9
(England) Robinson	2	5	4
(Egypt) Saad	9	9	9
(England) Lee	7	0	5
(England) Kenyon	9	6	9	9
7	(Australia) Thorne	7	9	6	6
(Sweden) Johnson	5	9	9	2	9
(England) Jahan	9	1	5	9	7
(England) Lloyd	5	9	6	9	9
(Sweden) Soderberg	9	2	9	3	0
(Pakistan) Karimullah K	4	9	3	9	9
(South Africa) Hailstone	9	5	9	5	4
4	(Australia) Dittmar	9	9	9
(England) Harvey	3	5	6
(Australia) Smith	10	1	9	9
(Singapore) Hill P	9	9	5	7

Third round
2	(Pakistan) Zaman	4	9	9	5	9
(Egypt) Saad	9	6	1	9	1
(England) Kenyon	9	3	9	9
(Sweden) Johnson	0	9	2	2
(England) Lloyd	6	10	4	9	9
(Pakistan) Karimullah K	9	8	9	3	8 ret
4	(Australia) Dittmar	4	9	9	9
(Australia) Smith	9	5	1	0

Quarter-finals
2	(Pakistan) Zaman	4	0	2
(England) Kenyon	9	9	9
Semi-finals
(England) Kenyon	5	3	3
4	(Australia) Dittmar	9	9	9
(England) Lloyd	4	9	3	4
4	(Australia) Dittmar	9	4	9	9

Greg Pollard (Aus) seeded fifth withdrew before the tournament started.

Preceded by 1984	British Open Squash Championships; England (London); 1985	Succeeded by 1986
