= 1988 Men's British Open Squash Championship =

British Open Squash Championships
- 50th British Open Championships

Details
- Location: London, England
- Venue: Wembley Squash Centre & Wembley Conference Centre
- Dates: 11–18 April 1988

The 1988 Hi-Tec British Open Championships was held at the Wembley Squash Centre with the later stages being held at the Wembley Conference Centre from 11–18 April 1988.
Jahangir Khan won his seventh consecutive title defeating Rodney Martin in the final in seven sets.

== Seeds ==
1. (Pakistan) Jansher Khan
2. (Pakistan) Jahangir Khan
3. (Australia) Chris Dittmar
4. (New Zealand) Ross Norman
5. (Australia) Rodney Martin
6. (Australia) Chris Robertson
7. (Pakistan) Umar Hayat Khan
8. (Australia) Ross Thorne
9. (Australia) Tristan Nancarrow
10. (England) Phil Kenyon
11. unknown
12. (Australia) Brett Martin
13. unknown
14. (England) Bryan Beeson
15. (England) Geoff Williams
16. unknown

== Draw and results ==
=== Final Qualifying round ===
Player One	Player Two	Score
(England) Phil Whitlock	(New Zealand) Rory Watt	6-9 9-2 0-9 9-2 9-5
(Scotland) Mark Maclean	(England) Simon Taylor	9-1 5-9 9-7 4-9 9-1
(England) Jason Nicolle	(Singapore) Peter Hill	7-9 9-2 6-9 9-3 9-4
(Canada) Sabir Butt	(England) John Ransome	9-1 2-9 9-6 7-9 9-6
(Pakistan) Maqsood Ahmed	(Sweden) Björn Almström	9-6 7-9 9-0 9-0
(Canada) Gary Waite	(England) Jon Foster	9-5 9-1 9-0
(Pakistan) Mir Zaman Gul	(Egypt) Ahmed Tahir	5-9 9-7 9-5 6-9
(Australia) Geoff Hunt	(South Africa) Paul Symonds	9-6 9-4 9-2

=== Main draw ===
First round
2	(Pakistan) Jahangir Khan	9	9	9
(England) Jamie Hickox	0	0	1
10	(England) Phil Kenyon	4	9	9	9
(Australia) Geoff Hunt	9	5	1	3
7	(Pakistan) Umar Hayat Khan	9	10	9
(Pakistan) Zarak Jahan Khan	0	8	2
12	(Australia) Brett Martin	7	9	5	9	9
(Canada) Gary Waite	9	4	9	5	4
3	(Australia) Chris Dittmar	9	9	9
(Pakistan) Maqsood Ahmed	3	1	3
(England) Gawain Briars	9	9	9
(Pakistan) Qamar Zaman	2	0	2
9	(Australia) Tristan Nancarrow	9	9	9
(England) Del Harris	3	3	4
8	(Australia) Ross Thorne	9	9	9
(Pakistan) Mir Zaman Gul	1	5	4
5	(Australia) Rodney Martin
15	(England) Geoff Williams	5	9	9	9
(Scotland) Mark Maclean	9	7	2	3
1	(Pakistan) Jansher Khan	9	9	9
(England) Phil Whitlock	3	3	2
(Scotland) Stuart Hailstone	9	4	6	9	9
(Australia) Ricki Hill	3	9	9	4	2
4	(New Zealand) Ross Norman	7	9	9	10
(Canada) Sabir Butt	9	3	5	8
14	(England) Bryan Beeson	9	9	6	9
(Sweden) Anders Wahlstedt	6	0	9	5
6	(England) Chris Robertson	9	9	9
(England) Martin Bodimeade	2	0	6
(England) Jason Nicolle	5	9	9
(England) Neil Harvey	2	7	3

Second round
2	(Pakistan) Jahangir K	9	9	9
10	(England) Kenyon	4	1	0
7	(Pakistan) U H Khan	9	10	9
12	(Australia) B Martin	1	8	6
3	(Australia) Dittmar	9	9	9
(England) Briars	3	0	0
9	(Australia) Nancarrow	9	10	9
8	(Australia) Thorne	4	8	2
5	(Australia) R Martin	9	9	9	10
15	(England) Williams	6	10	4	8
1	(Pakistan) Jansher K	6	9	9	9
(Scotland) Hailstone	9	0	0	2
4	(New Zealand) Norman	9	9	9
14	(England) Beeson	2	5	1
6	(Australia) Robertson	9	10	9
(England) Nicolle	3	8	2

Quarter-finals
2	(Pakistan) Jahangir K	9	9	4	9
7	(Pakistan) U H Khan	3	2	6
3	(Australia) Dittmar	9	9	9
9	(Australia) Nancarrow	0	3	5
5	(Australia) R Martin	9	1	9	5	9
1	(Pakistan) Jansher K	6	9	4	9	5
4	(New Zealand) Norman	9	9	9
6	(Australia) Robertson	3	2	2

Semi-finals
2	(Pakistan) Jahangir K	1	9	9	9
3	(Australia) Dittmar	9	6	2	5
Final
2	(Pakistan) Jahangir K	9	8	9	9
5	(Australia) R Martin	2	10	0	1
5	(Australia) R Martin	9	9	9
4	(New Zealand) Norman	4	0	1

Preceded by 1987	British Open Squash Championships; England (London); 1988	Succeeded by 1989
