= 1983 Men's World Team Squash Championships =

Men's World Team 1983
- 9th World Men's Team Championship
- Location: New Zealand
- Date: 13 October - 21 October 1983

Results
- Champions: Pakistan
- Runners-up: England
- Third place: Australia

The 1983 Men's World Team Squash Championships were held in Auckland and Hamilton, New Zealand and took place from 13 October until 21 October 1983.

Pakistan won the gold medal.

== Seeds ==
1. Pakistan
2. England
3. Australia
4. Egypt
5. New Zealand
6. Sweden
7. United States
8. Canada

== Results ==
=== Pool 1 ===
Team one	Team two	Score
Pakistan	New Zealand Youth	3-0
Pakistan	Canada	3-0
Pakistan	Singapore	3-0
Pakistan	Scotland	3-0
New Zealand Youth	Canada	2-1
New Zealand Youth	Singapore	3-0
New Zealand Youth	Scotland	3-0
Canada	Singapore	3-0
Canada	Scotland	3-0
(Canada) Singapore	Scotland	2-1

Pos	Nation	Team	P	W	L	Pts
1	Pakistan	Maqsood Ahmed, Jahangir Khan, Qamar Zaman	4	4	0	8
2	New Zealand Youth*	Danny McQueen, John Mills, Anthony McMurtrie	4	3	1	6
3	Canada	Doug Whittaker, Steve Lawton, Dale Styner, John McRury	4	2	2	4
4	Singapore	Stewart Ballard, Peter Hill, Zainal Abidin	4	1	3	2
5	Scotland	Chris Wilson, Mark Maclean, Peter Fairlie	4	0	4	0

Note* = New Zealand Youth ineligible for qualification to next round.

=== Pool 2 ===
Team one	Team two	Score
England	United States	3-0
England	Zimbabwe	3-0
England	Papua New Guinea	3-0
England	Kuwait	3-0
United States	Zimbabwe	3-0
United States	Papua New Guinea	3-0
United States	Kuwait	3-0
Zimbabwe	Papua New Guinea	3-0
Zimbabwe	Kuwait	3-0
Papua New Guinea	Kuwait	3-0

Pos	Nation	Team	P	W	L	Pts
1	England	Gawain Briars, Phil Kenyon, Hiddy Jahan, Geoff Williams	4	4	0	8
2	United States	Kenton Jernigan, Ned Edwards, John Nimick, Mark Talbott	4	3	1	6
3	Zimbabwe	Wayne Krahner, David de Beer, Graham Prior, J. Lowe	4	2	2	4
4	Papua New Guinea	Brett Forster, Peter Gertzel, Tony Gardner, Graham Healey	4	1	3	2
5	Kuwait	Ali Al-Jazaf, R Al-Ouish, Esam Al-Modaf	4	0	4	0

=== Pool 3 ===
Team one	Team two	Score
Australia	Sweden	3-0
Australia	Wales	3-0
Australia	Malaysia	3-0
Australia	Hong Kong	3-0
Sweden	Wales	3-0
Sweden	Malaysia	3-0
Sweden	Hong Kong	3-0
Wales	Malaysia	3-0
Wales	Hong Kong	3-0
Malaysia	Hong Kong	3-0

Pos	Nation	Team	P	W	L	Pts
1	Australia	Ricki Hill, Dean Williams, Chris Dittmar, Ross Thorne	4	4	0	8
2	Sweden	Lars Kvant, Jan-Ulf Söderberg, Fredrik Johnson, Björn Almström	4	3	1	6
3	Wales	Teifion Salisbury, Cerryg Jones, Adrian Davies, Hugh Evans	4	2	2	4
4	Malaysia	Singaraveloo Maniam, Jerry Loo, Chong Sow Loong, Tan Kong Lam	4	1	3	2
5	Hong Kong	Ken Li, Ho Kuk Sing, V. Choong	4	0	4	0

=== Pool 4 ===
Team one	Team two	Score
Egypt	New Zealand	2-1
Egypt	(Republic of Ireland) Ireland	3-0
Egypt	Finland	3-0
Egypt	Japan	3-0
New Zealand	(Republic of Ireland) Ireland	3-0
New Zealand	Finland	3-0
New Zealand	Japan	3-0
(Republic of Ireland) Ireland	Finland	2-1
(Republic of Ireland) Ireland	Japan	3-0
Finland	Japan	3-0

Pos	Nation	Team	P	W	L	Pts
1	Egypt	Ahmed Safwat, Naser Zahran, Magdi Saad, Gamal El Amir	4	4	0	8
2	New Zealand	Stuart Davenport, Rod Hayes, Paul Viggers, Neven Barbour	4	3	1	6
3	(Republic of Ireland) Ireland	Willie Hosey, John Hearst, David Gotto, John Young	4	2	2	4
4	Finland	Jukka Serimaa, Magnus Lindholm, Markku Sainio, Kale Leskinen	4	1	3	2
5	Japan	H. Yoshida, Seiji Sakamoto, Hiroshi Ushiogi	4	0	4	0

=== Final Pool A ===
Team one	Team two	Score
Pakistan	United States	3-0
Pakistan	Australia	3-0
Pakistan	New Zealand	3-0
Australia	United States	3-0
Australia	New Zealand	3-0
(Australia) New Zealand	United States	2-1

Pos	Nation	P	W	L	Pts
1	Pakistan	3	3	0	6
2	Australia	3	2	1	4
3	New Zealand	3	1	2	2
4	United States	3	0	3	0

=== Final Pool B ===
Team one	Team two	Score
England	Egypt	2-1
England	Sweden	3-0
England	Canada	3-0
Egypt	Sweden	2-1
Egypt	Canada	3-0
Sweden	Canada	3-0

Pos	Nation	P	W	L	Pts
1	England	3	3	0	6
2	Egypt	3	2	1	4
3	Sweden	3	1	2	2
4	Canada	3	0	3	0

=== Semi-finals ===
Team one	Team two	Score
England	Australia	3-0
Pakistan	Egypt	3-0

=== Third Place Play Off ===
Team one	Team two	Score
Australia	Egypt	2-1

=== Final ===
Pakistan
3
FINAL
Auckland, New Zealand
21 October 1983

England
0

			1	2	3	4	5
1	(Pakistan) (England)	Jahangir Khan; Hiddy Jahan	9; 3	9; 3	9; 7
2	(Pakistan) (England)	Qamar Zaman; Gawain Briars	9; 3	10; 8	1; 9	9; 3
3	(Pakistan) (England)	Maqsood Ahmed; Phil Kenyon	9; 2	9; 1	9; 4

Preceded by Sweden; 1981	Squash World Team; New Zealand; 1983	Succeeded by Egypt; 1985

== See also ==
- World Team Squash Championships
- World Squash Federation
- World Open (squash)
