= 1987 Men's World Team Squash Championships =

Men's World Team 1987
- 11th World Men's Team Championship
- Location: England
- Date: 17–31 October 1987

Results
- Champions: Pakistan
- Runners-up: New Zealand
- Third place: England

The 1987 Men's ICI Perspex World Team Squash Championships were held in London, England, and took place from 17 October until 31 October 1987. A record twenty-seven countries entered.

Pakistan won the gold medal.

== Seeds ==
1. Pakistan
2. (New Zealand) Australia
3. (Australia) New Zealand
4. England

== Results ==
=== Qualifying Pool 1 ===
Team one	Team two	Score
Italy	Belgium	2-1
Spain	Nigeria	w/o
Belgium	Nigeria	w/o
Italy	Spain	1-2
Italy	Nigeria	w/o
Spain	Belgium	2-1

Pos	Nation	P	W	L	Pts
1	Spain	3	3	0	6
2	Italy	3	2	1	4
3	Belgium	3	1	2	2
4	(France) Nigeria	3	0	3	0

=== Qualifying Pool 2 ===
Team one	Team two	Score
Denmark	Kuwait	3-0
Norway	Monaco	3-0
Denmark	Monaco	3-0
Norway	Kuwait	3-0
Kuwait	Monaco	3-0
Denmark	Norway	2-1

Pos	Nation	P	W	L	Pts
1	Denmark	3	3	0	6
2	Norway	3	2	1	4
3	Kuwait	3	1	2	2
4	Monaco	3	0	3	0

=== Qualifying Play Offs ===
Team one	Team two	Score
Norway	Belgium	2-1
Kuwait	Italy	2-1

=== Pool A ===
Team one	Team two	Score
Pakistan	Sweden	3-0
Pakistan	West Germany	3-0
Pakistan	Norway	3-0
Pakistan	Greece	3-0
Pakistan	Malaysia	3-0
Sweden	West Germany	3-0
Sweden	Norway	3-0
Sweden	Greece	3-0
Sweden	Malaysia	3-0
West Germany	Norway	2-1
West Germany	Greece	3-0
West Germany	Malaysia	3-0
Norway	Greece	2-1
Norway	Malaysia	2-1
Greece	Malaysia	2-1

Pos	Nation	Team	P	W	L	Pts
1	Pakistan	Jansher Khan, Jahangir Khan, Umar Hayat Khan, Qamar Zaman	5	5	0	10
2	Sweden	Jan-Ulf Söderberg, Anders Wahlstedt, Jonas Gornerup	5	4	1	8
3	West Germany	Carol Martini, Ralf Schuldt, Michael Ehlers, Wolfgang Bücker	5	3	2	6
4	Norway	Johan Aabyholm, Per Christiansen, Morten Kristensen, Hans Merckoll	5	2	3	4
5	Greece	Nikos Moustroufis, Panagiotis Vasiliou, Nicos Kouremenos	5	1	4	2
5	Malaysia	Raymond Arnold, K L Tan, Steven Kwan	5	0	5	0

=== Pool B ===
Team one	Team two	Score
New Zealand	Canada	3-0
New Zealand	Finland	3-0
New Zealand	Wales	3-0
New Zealand	United States	3-0
New Zealand	Denmark	3-0
Canada	Finland	2-1
Canada	Wales	2-1
Canada	United States	3-0
Canada	Denmark	3-0
Finland	Wales	3-0
Finland	United States	2-1
Finland	Denmark	3-0
Wales	United States	2-1
Wales	Denmark	3-0
United States	Denmark	3-0

Pos	Nation	Team	P	W	L	Pts
1	New Zealand	Stuart Davenport, Ross Norman, Stephen Cunningham, Rory Watt	5	5	0	10
2	Canada	Dale Styner, Sabir Butt, Jamie Crombie, Gene Turk	5	4	1	8
3	Finland	Matti Saarela, Sami Elopuro, Pentti Pekkanen	5	3	2	6
4	Wales	Cerryg Jones, Adrian Davies, Teifion Salisbury, Andrew Evans	5	2	3	4
5	United States	Ned Edwards, Kenton Jernigan, Thomas Page, Azam Khan	5	1	4	2
5	Denmark	Arthur Jacobsen, Peter Juel, Michael Just	5	0	5	0

=== Pool C ===
Team one	Team two	Score
Australia	Singapore	3-0
Australia	Netherlands	3-0
Australia	France	3-0
Australia	Switzerland	3-0
Australia	Spain	3-0
Singapore	Netherlands	2-1
Singapore	France	3-0
Singapore	Switzerland	3-0
Singapore	Spain	3-0
Netherlands	France	2-1
Netherlands	Switzerland	3-0
Netherlands	Spain	2-1
France	Switzerland	3-0
France	Spain	2-1
Switzerland	Spain	2-1

Pos	Nation	Team	P	W	L	Pts
1	Australia	Chris Dittmar, Rodney Martin, Chris Robertson, Ross Thorne	5	5	0	10
2	Singapore	Peter Hill, Zainal Abidin, Anthony Chua, Alex Tay	5	4	1	8
3	Netherlands	Hans Frieling, Raymond Scheffer, Eric Smit	5	3	2	6
4	France	Patrick Gaston, John Elstob, Eric Claudel	5	2	3	4
5	Switzerland		5	1	4	2
5	Spain	Albert Codina, Austin Adarraga, Santiago Nieto	5	0	5	0

=== Pool D ===
Team one	Team two	Score
England	Egypt	3-0
England	Scotland	3-0
England	(Republic of Ireland) Ireland	3-0
England	Brazil	3-0
England	Kuwait	3-0
Egypt	Scotland	3-0
Egypt	(Republic of Ireland) Ireland	2-1
Egypt	Brazil	3-0
Egypt	Kuwait	3-0
Scotland	(Republic of Ireland) Ireland	2-1
Scotland	Brazil	3-0
Scotland	Kuwait	3-0
(Republic of Ireland) Ireland	Brazil	2-1
(Republic of Ireland) Ireland	Kuwait	3-0
Brazil	Kuwait	3-0

Pos	Nation	Team	P	W	L	Pts
1	England	Phil Kenyon, Gawain Briars, Neil Harvey, Bryan Beeson	5	5	0	10
2	Egypt	Ahmed Tahir, Magdi Saad, Gamal El Amir	5	4	1	8
3	Scotland	Mark Maclean, Colin Keith, Frank Ellis	5	3	2	6
4	(Republic of Ireland) Ireland	John McKay, Ken Flynn, Noel Ryan	5	2	3	4
5	Brazil	Kiko Frisoni, Ricardo Ferreira, Mario de Oliveira, Rodriguez Soares	5	1	4	2
5	Kuwait	Tareq Al-Owayesh, Adel Al-Ghareeb, Fakher Al-Sayed	5	0	5	0

=== Quarter-finals ===
Team one	Team two	Score
New Zealand	Egypt	3-0
Pakistan	Singapore	3-0
England	Canada	3-0
Australia	Sweden	3-0

=== Semi-finals ===
Team one	Team two	Score
New Zealand	England	2-1
Pakistan	Australia	2-1

=== Third Place Play Off ===
Team one	Team two	Score
England	Australia	2-1

=== Final ===
Pakistan
3
FINAL
Royal Albert Hall, London, England
31 October 1987

New Zealand
0

			1	2	3	4	5
1	(Pakistan) (New Zealand)	Jahangir Khan; Stuart Davenport	9; 5	9; 1	9; 0
2	(Pakistan) (New Zealand)	Jansher Khan; Ross Norman	2; 9	9; 0	8; 10	9; 0	9; 6
3	(Pakistan) (New Zealand)	Umar Hayat Khan; Stephen Cunningham	9; 5	9; 2	9; 2

== See also ==
- World Team Squash Championships
- World Squash Federation
- World Open (squash)

Preceded by Egypt; 1985	Squash World Team; England; 1987	Succeeded by Singapore; 1989
