= 1981 Men's World Team Squash Championships =

Men's World Team 1981
- 8th World Men's Team Championship
- Location: Sweden
- Date: September 24 - October 3, 1981

Results
- Champions: Pakistan
- Runners-up: Australia
- Third place: Egypt

The 1981 Men's World Team Squash Championships were held in Sweden and took place from September 24 until October 3, 1981.

== Results ==
=== Group 1 (Gävle) ===
Team One	Team Two	Score
Pakistan	United States	3-0
Pakistan	Canada	3-0
Pakistan	Singapore	3-0
United States	Singapore	2-1
United States	Canada	2-1
Canada	Singapore	3-0

Pos	Nation	Team	P	W	L	Pts
1	Pakistan	Maqsood Ahmed, Jahangir Khan, Qamar Zaman	3	3	0	6
2	United States	Bill Andruss, Ned Edwards, Ted Gross, Stu Goldstein	3	2	1	4
3	Canada	Doug Whittaker, Aziz Khan, Dale Styner, Marc Lalonde	3	1	2	2
4	Singapore	Stewart Ballard, Woon Wai Ping, Zainal Abidin	3	0	3	0

=== Group 2 (Malmö) ===
Team One	Team Two	Score
Australia	Scotland	3-0
Australia	(Republic of Ireland) Ireland	3-0
Australia	Zimbabwe	3-0
Australia	Monaco	3-0
Scotland	(Republic of Ireland) Ireland	2-1
Scotland	Zimbabwe	2-1
Scotland	Monaco	3-0
(Republic of Ireland) Ireland	Zimbabwe	2-1
(Republic of Ireland) Ireland	Monaco	3-0
Zimbabwe	Monaco	3-0

Pos	Nation	Team	P	W	L	Pts
1	Australia	Glen Brumby, Steve Bowditch, Greg Pollard, Ross Thorne	4	4	0	8
2	Scotland	Chris Wilson, John McGhee, Gordon Blair	4	3	1	6
3	(Republic of Ireland) Ireland	Gar Holohan, John Young, David Gotto, Ben Cranwell	4	2	2	4
4	Zimbabwe		4	1	3	2
5	Monaco		4	0	4	0

=== Group 3 (Gothenburg) ===
Team One	Team Two	Score
New Zealand	Sweden	2-1
New Zealand	Finland	3-0
New Zealand	Netherlands	2-1
New Zealand	France	3-0
New Zealand	Norway	3-0
Sweden	Finland	3-0
Sweden	Netherlands	3-0
Sweden	France	3-0
Sweden	Norway	3-0
Finland	Netherlands	2-1
Finland	France	3-0
Finland	Norway	3-0
Netherlands	France	3-0
Netherlands	Norway	3-0
France	Norway	3-0

Pos	Nation	Team	P	W	L	Pts
1	New Zealand	Ross Norman, Bruce Brownlee, Craig Blackwood, Neven Barbour	5	5	0	10
2	Sweden	Lars Kvant, Mikael Hellstrom, Peter Boström	5	4	1	8
3	Finland	Roger Jones, Harri Bucht, Markku Sainio, Kale Leskinen	5	3	2	6
4	Netherlands	Eric van der Pluijm, Fred Saarloos, Dirk-Jan Remijnse, Jacob Reminjse	5	2	3	4
5	France	Bernard Rougé, Clarence Clauss, Michel Baulac, K Roisse	5	1	4	2
6	Norway	Johan Abyholm, Pål-Eric Christophersen, Sigurd Hammerstad	5	0	5	0

=== Group 4 (Linköping) ===
Team One	Team Two	Score
Egypt	England	2-1
Egypt	Nigeria	3-0
Egypt	West Germany	3-0
Egypt	Kuwait	3-0
England	Nigeria	3-0
England	West Germany	3-0
England	Kuwait	3-0
Nigeria	West Germany	2-1
Nigeria	Kuwait	2-1
West Germany	Kuwait	2-1

Pos	Nation	Team	P	W	L	Pts
1	Egypt	Ahmed Safwat, Aly Abdel Aziz, Magdi Saad	4	4	0	8
2	England	Gawain Briars, Phil Kenyon, Ian Robinson, John Le Lievre	4	3	1	6
3	Nigeria		4	2	2	4
4	West Germany	Manfred Lang, Wolfgang Bücker, Manfred Herwig	4	1	3	2
5	Kuwait		4	0	4	0

=== Final Pool A (Stockholm) ===
Team One	Team Two	Score
Pakistan	Egypt	3-0
Sweden	Scotland	3-0
Pakistan	Scotland	3-0
Egypt	Sweden	3-0
Pakistan	Sweden	3-0
Egypt	Scotland	3-0

Pos	Nation	P	W	L	Pts
1	Pakistan	3	3	0	6
2	Egypt	3	2	1	4
3	Sweden	3	1	2	2
4	Scotland	3	0	3	0

=== Final Pool B (Stockholm) ===
Team One	Team Two	Score
Australia	New Zealand	2-1
England	United States	3-0
Australia	England	2-1
New Zealand	United States	3-0
Australia	United States	3-0
England	New Zealand	2-1

Pos	Nation	P	W	L	Pts
1	Australia	3	3	0	6
2	England	3	2	1	4
3	New Zealand	3	1	2	2
4	United States	3	0	3	0

=== Third Place Play Off (Stockholm) ===
Team One	Team Two	Score
Egypt	England	2-1

=== Final ===
Pakistan
3
FINAL
Stockholm, Sweden
03 October 1981

Australia
0

			1	2	3	4	5
1	(Pakistan) (Australia)	Jahangir Khan; Steve Bowditch	9; 0	7; 4
2	(Pakistan) (Australia)	Qamar Zaman; Glen Brumby	7; 9	0; 9	9; 5	9; 0	9; 2
3	(Pakistan) (Australia)	Maqsood Ahmed; Greg Pollard	9; 3	9; 7	9; 1

Preceded by Australia; 1979	Squash World Team; Sweden; 1981	Succeeded by New Zealand; 1983

== See also ==
- World Team Squash Championships
- World Squash Federation
- World Open (squash)
