= 1977 Men's World Team Squash Championships =

Squash event

Men's World Team 1977
- 6th World Men's Team Championship
- Location: Canada
- Date: September 12–18, 1977

Results
- Champions: Pakistan
- Runners-up: New Zealand
- Third place: Egypt

The 1977 Men's World Team Amateur Squash Championships were held in Toronto and Ottawa in Canada, and took place from September 12 to September 18, 1977.

== Results ==
=== Round Robin ===
| Team One | Team Two | Score |
|---|---|---|
| Pakistan | New Zealand | 1-2 |
| Pakistan | Egypt | 3-0 |
| Pakistan | (United Kingdom) Great Britain | 2-1 |
| Pakistan | Australia | 3-0 |
| Pakistan | Sweden | 3-0 |
| Pakistan | Canada | 3-0 |
| Pakistan | United States | 3-0 |
| New Zealand | Egypt | 1-2 |
| New Zealand | (United Kingdom) Great Britain | 2-1 |
| New Zealand | Australia | 2-1 |
| New Zealand | Sweden | 2-1 |
| New Zealand | Canada | 3-0 |
| New Zealand | United States | 3-0 |
| Egypt | (United Kingdom) Great Britain | 2-1 |
| Egypt | Australia | 2-1 |
| Egypt | Sweden | 2-1 |
| Egypt | Canada | 3-0 |
| Egypt | United States | 3-0 |
| (United Kingdom) Great Britain | Australia | 3-0 |
| (United Kingdom) Great Britain | Sweden | 2-1 |
| (United Kingdom) Great Britain | Canada | 3-0 |
| (United Kingdom) Great Britain | United States | 3-0 |
| Australia | Sweden | 2-1 |
| Australia | Canada | 2-1 |
| Australia | United States | 3-0 |
| Sweden | Canada | 2-1 |
| Sweden | United States | 2-1 |
| Canada | United States | 3-0 |

| Pos | Nation | Team | P | W | L | F | A | Pts |
|---|---|---|---|---|---|---|---|---|
| 1 | Pakistan | Mohamed Saleem, Maqsood Ahmed, Atlas Khan, Daulat Khan | 7 | 6 | 1 | 18 | 3 | 12 |
| 2 | New Zealand | Murray Lilley, Howard Broun, Bruce Brownlee, Neven Barbour | 7 | 6 | 1 | 15 | 6 | 12 |
| 3 | Egypt | Allam Soliman, Gamal Awad, Mohammed Awad | 7 | 6 | 1 | 14 | 7 | 12 |
| 4 | (United Kingdom) Great Britain | Jonathan Leslie, Ian Robinson, John Richardson, Barry O'Connor | 7 | 4 | 3 | 14 | 7 | 8 |
| 5 | Australia | Dean Williams, Frank Donnelly, Ian Yeates, Terry Cheetham | 7 | 3 | 4 | 9 | 12 | 6 |
| 6 | Sweden | Lars Kvant, Mikael Hellstrom, Johan Stockenberg, Bo Bostrum | 7 | 2 | 5 | 8 | 13 | 4 |
| 7 | Canada | Jug Walia, Ian Shaw, John Lennard, Mike Desaulniers | 7 | 1 | 6 | 5 | 16 | 2 |
| 8 | United States | Denis Bourke, Leonard Bernheimer, Eliot Berry, Thomas Poor | 7 | 0 | 7 | 1 | 20 | 0 |

== See also ==
- World Team Squash Championships
- World Squash Federation
- World Open (squash)

| Preceded by (the Midlands) England; 1976 | Squash World Team (Toronto & Ottawa) Canada; 1977 | Succeeded by Australia (Brisbane); 1979 |
