= 1976 Men's British Open Squash Championship =

British Open Squash Championships
- 38th British Open Championships

Details
- Location: Wembley, England
- Venue: Wembley Squash Centre

The 1976 Lucas Industries British Open Squash Championship was unique in that it doubled as the men's edition of the 1976 World Open, which serves as the individual world championship for squash players. The event took place in London in England from 31 January to 7 February 1976. Geoff Hunt won his third British Open title, defeating Mohibullah Khan in the final.
Held at Wembley a record prize fund of £10,000 was put forward for this first professional World Open and 38th British Open.

.

== Seeds ==
1. (Pakistan) Qamar Zaman (Semifinals)
2. (Australia) Geoff Hunt (Champion)
3. (Pakistan) Gogi Alauddin
4. (Pakistan) Mohibullah Khan
5. (Pakistan) Hiddy Jahan
6. (Australia) Ken Hiscoe
7. (Australia) Cameron Nancarrow
8. (Republic of Ireland) Jonah Barrington

== Draw and results ==
=== Section 1 ===
First round
1	(Pakistan) Qamar Zaman	9	9	9
(Australia) Dean Williams	5	0	2
(Egypt) Sherif Aly	9	9	9
(Egypt) A Mottelb-Hussein	0	0	0
(Egypt) Mohammed Asran	9	9	9
(England) Gavin Dupre	5	5	3
(Egypt) Galal Allam	9	9	9
(Pakistan) Rehmat Khan	2	2	3
8	(Republic of Ireland) Jonah Barrington	9	9	9
(England) Bryan Patterson	3	3	3
(England) Mike Grundy	9	9	9
(England) Nigel Faulks	3	6	5
(Pakistan) Mohammed Yasin	9	9	9
(England) Mike Corby	1	5	3
(Egypt) Mohamed Khalifa	9	9	9
(England) Paul Wright	6	0	2

Second round
1	(Pakistan) Zaman	9	9	9
(Egypt) Sherif Aly	2	1	5
(Egypt) Asran	9	9	9
(Egypt) Allam	5	1	1
8	(Republic of Ireland) Barrington	9	9	9
(England) Grundy	1	5	5
(Pakistan) Yasin	9	9	9
(Egypt) Khalifa	6	0	2

Third round
1	(Pakistan) Zaman	9	9	9
(Egypt) Asran	5	3	5
8	(Republic of Ireland) Barrington	5	10	9	9
(Pakistan) Yasin	9	8	1	4

Quarter finals
1	(Pakistan) Zaman	9	9	9
8	(Republic of Ireland) Barrington	0	1	6

=== Section 2 ===
First round
4	(Pakistan) Mohibullah Khan	9	9	9
(England) Pat Kirton	0	0	4
(Pakistan) Shah Jehan Khan	9	9	9
(Egypt) A Meguid	4	1	2
(South Africa) Roland Watson	9	9	9
(Pakistan) Amanullah Khan	5	0	0
(Australia) Frank Donnelly	9	9	8	9
(New Zealand) Craig Blackwood	3	5	10	2
5	(Pakistan) Hiddy Jahan	9	9	9
(Australia) Michael Donnelly	3	2	7
(Scotland) Kim Bruce-Lockhart	9	9	9
(England) Richard Leslie	4	5	2
(Australia) Bill Reedman	6	9	9	9
(England) Paul Millman	9	5	0	4
(England) Peter Verow	9	9	9
(England) Jonathon Yorke-Long	5	7	3

Second round
4	(Pakistan) M Khan	9	9	9
(Pakistan) S J Khan	3	7	6
(South Africa) Watson	9	9	9
(Australia) Donnelly	4	6	2
5	(Pakistan) Jahan	9	9	9
(Scotland) Bruce-Lockhart
(Australia) Reedman	9	9	9
(England) Verow	5	4	2

Third round
4	(Pakistan) M Khan	9	9	7	9
(South Africa) Watson	6	1	9	2
5	(Pakistan) Jahan	10	9	9
(Australia) Reedman	9	3	6

Quarter finals
4	(Pakistan) M Khan	6	9	4	9	9
5	(Pakistan) Jahan	9	1	9	7	1

=== Section 3 ===
First round
3	(Pakistan) Gogi Alauddin	9	9	9
(Pakistan) Mohammed Saleem	2	0	3
(England) Ian Robinson	9	9	9
(Scotland) Chris Wilson	6	3	8
(Egypt) Aly Abdel Aziz	9	9	9	9
(Australia) Kevin Shawcross	10	5	6	0
(Egypt) Abbas Kaoud	4	9	9	9
(England) Bryan Patterson	9	6	2	0
6	(Australia) Ken Hiscoe	7	9	9	9
(England) Bob Johnson	9	5	5	2
(Egypt) Gamal Awad	10	9	9
(South Africa) Richard O'Connor	9	6	4
(Pakistan) Torsam Khan	9	9	5
(England) Anthony Swift	5	7	0	ret
(Australia) Kim Richards	w/o
(England) John Easter	scr

Second round
3	(Pakistan) Alauddin	9	9	9
(England) Robinson	3	5	2
(Egypt) Aziz	8	9	6	9	9
(Egypt) Kaoud	10	4	9	2	6
6	(Australia) Hiscoe	10	9	4	9
(Egypt) Awad	8	5	9	6
(Pakistan) T Khan	9	9	4	9
(Australia) Richards	0	1	4	0

Third round
3	(Pakistan) Alauddin	9	9	9
(Egypt) Aziz	5	1	5
6	(Australia) Hiscoe	9	10	6	9
(Pakistan) T Khan	5	8	9	5

Quarter finals
3	(Pakistan) Alauddin	5	9	9	9
6	(Australia) Hiscoe	9	0	2	1

=== Section 4 ===
First round
7	(Australia) Cameron Nancarrow	9	9	9
(Pakistan) Afzal Khan	3	1	4
(United States) Bill Andruss	9	9	9
(England) Nick Topman	0	2	0
(Egypt) Ahmed Safwat	7	6	9	9	9
(Egypt) Moussa Helal	9	9	4	7	1
(Pakistan) Rahim Gul	10	9	9
(England) Barry O'Connor	9	6	4
(South Africa) Ian Holding	6	9	10	9
(Pakistan) Rehmatullah Khan	9	0	8	7
(England) Mike Thurgur	6	9	9	9
(England) Dick Carter	9	5	1	5
(Pakistan) Hassan Mahmoud	9	8	3	9	9
(New Zealand) Tony Naughton	4	10	9	4	4
(England) Clive Francis	1	5	0
2	(Australia) Geoff Hunt	9	9	9

Second round
7	(Australia) Nancarrow	9	9	9
(United States) Andruss	5	4	6
(Egypt) Safwat	5	1	9	9	9
(Pakistan) Rahim Gul	9	9	5	2	3
(South Africa) Holding	9	9	5	10
(England) Thurger	0	1	9	8
(Pakistan) Mahmoud	0	2	4
2	(Australia) Hunt	9	9	9

Third round
7	(Australia) Nancarrow	8	9	9	9
(Egypt) Safwat	10	5	7	6
(South Africa) Holding	3	5	2
2	(Australia) Hunt	9	9	9

Quarter finals
7	(Australia) Nancarrow	5	6	4
2	(Australia) Hunt	9	9	9

== Semi-finals & Final ==
Semi-finals
1	(Pakistan) Qamar Zaman	9	5	9	2	7
4	(Pakistan) Mohibullah Khan	6	9	3	9	9
3	(Pakistan) Gogi Alauddin	2	5	9	5
2	(Australia) Geoff Hunt	9	9	1	9

Final
4	(Pakistan) Mohibullah Khan	9	4	10	2	2
2	(Australia) Geoff Hunt	7	9	8	9	9

Preceded by 1975	British Open Squash Championships; England (London); 1976	Succeeded by 1977
