= Peter Fairlie =

Scottish squash player (born 1957)

Peter Fairlie (born 1957) is a squash player who represented the Scotland men's national squash team.

== Squash career ==
At the 1977 East of Scotland squash championships Fairlie surprised several top-ranked players. He played for Colinton Castle Sports Club and Bridge of Allan Sports Club in the Scottish League. Fairlie made his Scotland debut in 1980.

Fairlie represented Scotland at the 1983 Men's World Team Squash Championships in New Zealand. In 1984 he was number 2 in the Scottish rankings.

In December 1986 Fairlie was named in the same Scotland squad as Alasdair Taylor for the 1987 home international squash series. Both players were alumni of Strathallan School near Perth, Scotland.

Overall, Fairlie gained 21 caps for Scotland between 1980 and 1987. In 1989 he represented a Scottish Select team against Singapore.

=== World record ===
Between 30 June and 5 July 1979, Fairlie set a new world record for the longest squash marathon, 120 hours and 51 minutes, at the Bridge of Allan Sports Club in Scotland.
