= Abbas Khan (squash player) =

Pakistani squash player (1954–2021)

Abbas Khan (1954 – 30 January 2021) was a Pakistani squash player. In 1978, he obtained his career-best ranking, 7th.

== Biography ==
He joined the international circuit in 1973 alongside his companions Jahangir Khan and Jansher Khan. In 1980, he played an exhibition match in Dubai, which led to him being offered to coach the Emirate of Dubai's police squad team. There, he trained Ahmed Al-Maktoum, who later became the first Emirati to win an Olympic gold medal. Al-Maktoum also won ten consecutive squash titles within the United Arab Emirates. His gold medal came at the 2004 Summer Olympic Games in men's double trap.

Khan participated in the World Squash Championships in 1979, 1982, and 1983.

Abbas Khan died at St George's Hospital in London from complications of COVID-19 on 30 January 2021.
