= Michael Ehlers =

German academic

- Born: Germany
- Education: Caltech, Johns Hopkins University
- Known for: neurotransmitter receptors
- Scientific career
- Fields: Neuroscience
- Workplaces: Biogen
- Doctoral advisor: Richard L. Huganir

Michael D. Ehlers is an entrepreneur partner at venture capital firm MPM BioImpact. He was formerly Chief Scientific Officer and a partner at the venture capital firm Apple Tree Partners. Before that he was Executive Vice President for Research and Development at Biogen and before that was Chief Scientific Officer for Neuroscience at Pfizer. Prior to joining industry, Ehlers was the George Barth Geller Professor of Neurobiology and a Howard Hughes Medical Institute investigator at the Duke University Medical Center. His academic work was focused around neuronal organelles and the trafficking of neurotransmitter receptors.

He has a BS in chemistry from Caltech in 1991 and an MD and a PhD in neuroscience at Johns Hopkins School of Medicine with Richard L. Huganir. His work at Duke was centered around the trafficking of neurotransmitter receptors notably the AMPA receptor.

Ehler was born in Germany and raised in rural Nebraska. He plays French horn and piano. He first became interested in science as a child collecting insects and rocks. He was introduced to neurobiology when his girlfriend now wife suggested that math was involved with the field.
