= Rodney George =

Australian squash player (born 1954)

Rod George
Personal information
- Nationality: Australian
- Born: 1954 Perth, Australia

Sport
- Highest ranking: 15 (August 1985)

Rod George is a former professional squash player from Australia. He reached a career high ranking of no.15 in the world during August 1985.

== Biography ==
George was born in Perth, Australia in 1954. He was based in West Germany as a club professional and reached the world's top 25 at the end of the 1982/83 season.

George peaked at world number 15 in August 1985 but continued to play on the international tour, being seeded for multiple events.
