= David Lloyd (squash player) =

English squash player (born 1965)

David Lloyd (born 25 October 1965) is an English former professional squash player.

Lloyd was born in Wolverhampton and became British Under-19 champion and runner-up in the World Junior Squash Championships in 1984. He participated in the British Open Squash Championships during the eighties.
