= Fahim Gul =

Pakistani squash player (born 1956)

Fahim Gul (Urdu: فہیم گل, born 12 August 1956) is a Pakistani former professional squash player.

Fahim Gul was born in Rawalpindi. He is the brother of Rahim Gul and Jamshed Gul, two former world ranked players. He represented Pakistan during the 1979 World Team Squash Championships.
