= Trevor Wilkinson (squash player) =

Zimbabwean-South African squash player

Personal information
- Nationality: South African
- Born: 10 October 1960 (age 65) South Africa

Sport
- Highest ranking: 28 (September 1982)

Trevor Wilkinson (born 10 October 1960) is a former professional squash player from South African and later Zimbabwe.

Wilkinson lived in Cape Town, South Africa. He began to play squash at the age of 13 in Harare and won the South African Amateur Championship in 1981. He represented South Africa at international level before representing Zimbabwe.

In 1983 he won the East Sussex Open title and the Scottish Open.
