= Glen Brumby =

Australian squash player (born 1960)

Personal information
- Nationality: Australian
- Born: 11 May 1960 (age 66) Maylands, Australia

Sport
- Highest ranking: 9 (September 1982)
Medal record
Men's squash
Representing Australia
World Championships
Bronze medal – third place	1982 Birmingham	Singles
Bronze medal – third place	1985 Cairo	Singles
World Team Championships
Bronze medal – third place	1979 Brisbane	Team
Silver medal – second place	1981 Sweden	Team
Bronze medal – third place	1985 Egypt	Team

Glen Thomas Brumby (born 11 May 1960) is an Australian former professional squash player. He reached a career high ranking of 9 in the world during September 1982.

Born in Maylands, South Australia, Brumby represented Australia in the 1979, 1981 and 1985 World Team Squash Championships.

In 1983 Brumby was based in Nottingham, England and played for the Park Club.

Brumby reached the semi-final of the 1985 World Open in Cairo.
