= Zahir Hussein Khan =

Pakistani squash player (born 1960)

Personal information
- Nationality: Pakistani
- Born: 4 October 1960
- Died: Pakistan

Sport
- Highest ranking: 22 (January 1982)
Medal record
Men's squash
Representing Pakistan
World Team Championships
Silver medal – second place	1979 Brisbane	Team

Zahir Hussein Khan (Urdu: ظہیر حسین خان, born 4 October 1960) is a former professional squash player from Pakistan and a world team silver medalist. He reached a career high ranking of 22 in the world during January 1982.

== Biography ==
Zahir Hussein Khan moved to West Germany in order to compete on the European circuit. He represented Pakistan during the 1979 World Team Squash Championships, where he won a silver medal.
