= Mohammed Awad (squash player) =

Egyptian squash player (born 1949)

Personal information
- Nationality: Egyptian
- Born: 5 February 1949
- Died: Alexandria, Egypt

Sport
- Highest ranking: 23 (September 1982)

Mohammed Awad (Arabic: مُحَمَّد عَوَض; born 5 February 1949) is a former Egyptian professional squash player.

He was the runner-up in the Egyptian championships in 1972 and 1975 and represented Egypt in the 1976 and 1977 World Team Squash Championships. He achieved his career-high ranking of World No. 23 in September 1982.

Awad also won the Swedish, Finnish and Italian Opens. He is the older brother of Gamal Awad, another notable squash player.
