= Greg Pollard =

Australian squash player (born 1960)

Personal information
- Nationality: Australian
- Born: 5 November 1960

Sport
- Highest ranking: 5 (1985)
Medal record
Men's squash
Representing Australia
World Team Championships
Silver medal – second place	1981 Sweden	Team
Bronze medal – third place	1985 Egypt	Team

Greg Pollard (born 5 November 1960) is a former professional squash player from Australia. He reached a career high ranking of 5 in the world during 1985. He is a world team championship silver and bronze medal winner.

== Biography ==
Pollard started playing squash at the Albury Squash Centre in Albury, Australia, at the age of eleven. He won the Australian junior title in 1979.

Pollard moved to Nottingham in England, to further his career during the 1980s and later became the chairman of the Players' Association. He represented Australia in the 1981 and 1985 World Team Squash Championships, winning a silver and bronze medals respectively.
