= Jamie Hickox =

English-Canadian squash player

Personal information
- Born: 8 February 1964 (age 62) Canada

Sport
- Country: English/Canadian

Men's singles
- Highest ranking: No. 17 (August 1987)
Medal record
Men's squash
Representing England
European Team Championships
Gold medal – first place	1987 Vienna	Team

Jamie Hickox (born 8 February 1964) is a former English and Canadian professional squash player who represented both England and Canada at International level.

== Biography ==
Hickox was born in Canada but moved to England. He became the 1983 British Junior Open Squash Under-19 champion He represented Surrey at county level.

Hickox won a gold medal for the England men's national squash team at the 1987 European Squash Team Championships in Vienna.

In 1986, he became the Canadian Squash Champion and competed in the Men's World Open Squash Championship. John Furlong, whose professional biographies claim he was the Canadian champion, was an age group winner in 1986.

In 2011 he became the new Performance Director for Squash Canada after previously coaching the Malaysian National squad.
