= Lars Kvant =

Swedish squash player (1955–2025)

Personal information
- Nationality: Swedish
- Born: 27 March 1955 Malmö, Sweden
- Died: 14 January 2025 (aged 69)

Sport
Medal record
Men's squash
Representing Sweden
European Team Championships
Gold medal – first place	1981 Amsterdam	Team
Gold medal – first place	1983 Munich	Team

Lars Kvant (27 March 1955 – 14 January 2025) was a Swedish professional squash player.

== Biography ==
Born in Malmö, Sweden on 27 March 1955, Kvant was a leading European player in the seventies and eighties representing Sweden when they won the 1980 and 1983 European Championships. He was also part of the Swedish team at the 1977, 1979, 1981 & 1983 World Team Squash Championships.

Kvant died in January 2025, at the age of 69.
