= Dean Williams (squash player) =

Australian squash player (born 1956)

Personal information
- Nationality: Australian
- Born: 22 April 1956 (age 70) Perth, Western Australia

Sport
- Handedness: Right-Handed

Men's Singles
- Highest ranking: 3 (March 1984)
- World Open: RU (1982)
Medal record
Men's squash
Representing Australia
World Championships
| Silver medal – second place | 1982 Birmingham | Singles |
World Team Championships
| Bronze medal – third place | 1976 England | Team |
| Bronze medal – third place | 1983 New Zealand | Team |
| Bronze medal – third place | 1985 Egypt | Team |

Dean Harley Williams (born 22 April 1956 in Perth, Western Australia) is a retired squash player from Australia. He was one of the leading players in the game in the late-1970s and 1980s. He reached a career–high world ranking of World No. 3 in 1984 and was the runner up in the 1982 World Championships.

== Biography ==
Williams first played squash in 1969 and won the 1976 East Sussex Open.

He made his professional debut in Sheffield during March 1978 and by 1979 Williams was described as a rising star and had beaten notable world ranked players.

In 1982, Williams finished runner–up at the World Open, losing in the final to the legendary Pakistani player Jahangir Khan 9–2, 6–9, 9–1, 9–1. After the retirement of Geoff Hunt he became the Australian number 1. He also won two medals with the Australia men's national squash team at the World Team Championships.

Since retiring from the top-level game, Williams has worked as a squash coach and remained active in seniors tournaments.
