= Sohail Qaiser =

Pakistani squash player (1965–2016)

Personal information
- Nationality: Pakistani
- Born: c.1965 Lahore, Pakistan
- Died: August 2016

Sport
- Turned pro: 1984
- Highest ranking: 19 (May 1983)
Medal record
World Team Championships
| Gold medal – first place | 1985 Cairo | Team |

Sohail Qaiser (Urdu: سہیل قیصر; 1965 – August 2016) was a Pakistani professional squash player. He reached a career high ranking of 19 in the world during May 1983.

== Early life ==
Sohail Qaiser was born in 1965 and lived in Lahore, Pakistan. His uncle was Gogi Alauddin.

In 1982, he won both the World Junior Championship in and British under-23 Open at Wembley. He became a full Pakistan international in the mid-1980s. He was part of the Pakistan team that won the 1985 Men's World Team Squash Championships.

== Death ==
Sohail Qaiser died from lung cancer on August 14, 2016.
