= Ricki Hill =

Australian squash player (born 1960)

Personal information
- Nationality: Australian
- Born: 7 September 1960
- Died: Sydney, Australia

Sport
- Highest ranking: 10 (January 1988)

Ricki Hill is a former professional squash player from Australia. He reached a career high ranking of 10 in the world during January 1988.

== Biography ==
Born in Sydney on 7 September 1960 he moved to London to find regular competition and became one of the leading Australian players in the 1980s.

He played for Dunnings Mill in East Grinstead before moving in 1985 to play for Manchester Northern in the English leagues.
