= Magdi Saad =

Egyptian squash player

Personal information
- Nationality: Egyptian
- Born: 11 December 1954 Egypt
- Died: March 2011 Saudi Arabia

Sport
- Highest ranking: 10 (May 1983)
Medal record
Men's squash
Representing Egypt
World Team Championships
Bronze medal – third place	1981 Sweden	Team

Magdi Saad (Arabic: مَجْدِيّ سَعْد; 11 December 1954 – 2011) was an Egyptian professional squash player who later became a coach. He reached a career high ranking of 10 in the world during May 1983.

== Biography ==
Born on 11 December 1954, he moved to West Germany and lived in Hamburg. He competed several times as a top-16 seeded player in the British Open Squash Championships. Saad represented Egypt at the 1979, 1981, 1983 and 1985 World Team Squash Championships. He reached a career-high world ranking of World No. 10 in May 1983.

Saad died in 2011, while woring in Saudi Arabia.
