= Ross Norman =

New Zealand squash player

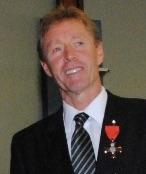
- Norman in 2014

Personal information
- Nationality: New Zealander
- Born: 7 January 1959 (age 67) Whitianga, New Zealand

Sport
- Handedness: Right-Handed
- Retired: 1995

Men's singles
- Highest ranking: 2 (December 1985)
- World Open: W (1986)
Medal record
Men's squash
Representing New Zealand
World Championships
Gold medal – first place	1986 Toulouse	Singles
Silver medal – second place	1985 Cairo	Singles
Bronze medal – third place	1984 Karachi	Singles
Bronze medal – third place	1988 Amsterdam	Singles

Ross William Norman MNZM (born 7 January 1959) is a former professional squash player from New Zealand. He was the 1986 world champion, after beating Jahangir Khan. He reached a career high ranking of 2 in the world during December 1985.

== Biography ==
Norman first played squash in 1968 and won the New Zealand junior title in 1977 before taking over the New Zealand number 1 ranking from the retiring Bruce Brownlee in 1981.

During the summer of 1983 he injured his knee on a parachute jump and was out of squash for a significant period of time, being replaced as New Zealand number 1 by Stuart Davenport. The injury caused a change in his training schedule and Norman began to rise in the world rankings. In 1984 he reached the semi-finals of the 1984 World Open in Karachi and the following year went one better by reaching the final at the 1985 World Open in Cairo. By December 1985 he was ranked number 2 in the world.

In the 1986 world final he beat Jahangir Khan of Pakistan 9–5, 9–7, 7–9, 9–1 to end Jahangir's unbeaten streak dating back to 1981. The win marked the end of an unbeaten run for Khan that had stretched for over five years. Norman had been ranked the World No. 2 behind Khan for some time going into the match, but despite a single-minded determination to end his unbeaten run had been unable to end the total dominance that the Pakistani had held over the game. Norman had vowed: "One day Jahangir will be slightly off his game and I will get him." That day finally came in the final of squash's biggest tournament, which was held that year in Toulouse, France.

Norman retired from the professional squash circuit in 1995, but has remained active in seniors events. He now has two sons, Brett and Alex.

In the 2014 New Year Honours, Norman was appointed a Member of the New Zealand Order of Merit for services to squash.
