= Maqsood Ahmed (squash player) =

Pakistani squash player and Former World Champion

Personal information
- Nickname: Max
- Nationality: Pakistani
- Born: 30 August 1957 (age 68) Karachi, Pakistan

Sport
- Turned pro: 1978
- Retired: yes
- Highest ranking: 4 (April 1980)
Medal record
Men's squash
Representing Pakistan
World Championships
Bronze medal – third place	1979 Toronto	Singles
Bronze medal – third place	1984 Karachi	Singles
World Amateur Championship
Gold medal – first place	1977 Toronto	Singles
World Team Championships
Gold medal – first place	1977 Canada	Team
Gold medal – first place	1981 Sweden	Team
Gold medal – first place	1983 New Zealand	Team

Maqsood Ahmed (born 30 August 1957) is a Pakistani former professional squash player who was the world amateur champion and twice bronze medallist in the professional world championships.

== Biography ==
Born in Karachi, he started playing squash in 1968 and turned professional in 1978. In 1977 he became the first player to win the Pakistani Amateur and Open titles in the same year. He retained a world top ten seeding for a decade. Also in 1977 he won the World Amateur Squash Championship held in Toronto, defeating his brother Mohamed Saleem in the final.

He was twice a bronze medallist at the World Squash Championships in 1979 and 1984.

Ahmed was a three-time a world team champion with the Pakistan men's national squash team, winning the 1977 Men's World Team Squash Championships in Canada, the 1981 Men's World Team Squash Championships in Sweden and the 1983 Men's World Team Squash Championships in New Zealand.
