= Ross Thorne =

Australian squash player (born 1957)

Personal information
- Nationality: Australian
- Born: 7 November 1957 (age 68) Australia

Sport
- Highest ranking: 4 (August 1986)
Medal record
Men's squash
Representing Australia
World Team Championships
Bronze medal – third place	1979 Brisbane	Team
Silver medal – second place	1981 Sweden	Team
Bronze medal – third place	1983 New Zealand	Team
Bronze medal – third place	1985 Egypt	Team

Ross Thorne is a former professional squash player from Australia. He reached a career high ranking of 4 in the world during August 1986 and won four medals at the World Team Championships.

== Biography ==
Thorne was born on 7 November 1957, and lived in Queensland. He married Rhonda Shapland, who was crowned women's world champion in 1981.

Thornes's break-out year was 1983 when he won the Queensland, Australian and South African titles. Thorne played in the British Premier League but was subject to controversy. He signed for Edgbaston Priory in 1985 but let the club down and later in 1987 was sacked by Arrow Village after failing to turn up to a match.

Thorne achieved his highest world ranking of number four in August 1986, and represented Australia in the 1979, 1981, 1983 and 1985 World Team Squash Championships, finishing runners-up in 1981.

Thorne was named the player-manager of the Australian team during the 1987 Men's World Team Squash Championships.
