= Hiddy Jahan =

Pakistani squash player (born 1950)

Personal information
- Born: 15 March 1950 (age 76) Quetta, Pakistan

Sport
- Country: Pakistan
- Highest ranking: 4 (January 1979)
Medal record
Men's squash
Representing Pakistan
World Championships
Bronze medal – third place	1980 Adelaide	Singles
Bronze medal – third place	1981 Toronto	Singles
Bronze medal – third place	1982 Birmingham	Singles

Hidayet Jahan (born 15 March 1950) is a former squash player who was ranked among the top six players in the world from 1970 through to 1986. He represented Pakistan before switching allegiance to England.

== Biography ==
A serious accident almost killed him in 1967. He had been selected to represent Pakistan in the inaugural squash World Team Championship, and was on a train travelling from Quetta to Karachi for the final training camp when he leaned too far out of a railway carriage door and struck his head against a signal post. He was extremely lucky to survive.

In later years, as he established himself as a top player on the international scene, reaching a highest world ranking on 4 during November 1979. He felt that he did not receive proper support from the Pakistani squash authorities. He thus chose to go on a tour of South Africa during the apartheid era for purely financial reasons. For this, he was banned and his passport impounded. As a result, he moved to the United Kingdom in 1978 (he was able to secure permission to do so partly because of his British wife) and became a Britain citizen in 1983. In the last few years of his top-level career, he represented England in international competitions, including at the 1983 Men's World Team Squash Championships.

Hiddy was a close friend of Torsam Khan, the older brother of Jahangir Khan. Hiddy played an important role in helping to groom the young Jahangir, who went on to become the dominant player in the game in the 1980s. Hiddy was runner-up to Jahangir at the British Open in 1982.

In recent years, Hiddy has been a successful squash player in veteran's events. He has won British Open titles at the Over-35, Over-40, Over-45 and Over-50 level.

Hiddy's younger brothers Zarak Jahan Khan and Zubair Jahan Khan also both became successful professional squash players on the international circuit.
