= Gamal Awad =

Egyptian squash player

Personal information
- Nationality: Egyptian
- Born: 9 August 1955
- Died: 6 November 2004 (aged 49) Alexandria, Egypt

Sport
- Highest ranking: 3 (January 1984)
Medal record
Men's squash
Representing Egypt
World Championships
Bronze medal – third place	1983 Munich	Singles
British Amateur Championships
Gold medal – first place	1977/1978	singles
Gold medal – first place	1978/1979	singles

Gamal Awad (Arabic: جَمَال عَوَض; 9 August 1955 – 6 November 2004) was an Egyptian squash player. He reached a career high ranking of 3 in the world during January 1984.

== Biography ==
Awad was the younger brother of Mohammed Awad, another notable Egyptian squash player. Awad became the Egyptian national champion in 1976, and won the British Amateur championship during the 1977/78 and 1978/79 seasons. He finished runner-up to Jahangir Khan at both the 1982 World Masters and the 1983 British Open.

The match for which Awad is best remembered came at the Chichester Open in 1983 against Jahangir, which set a new world record for the longest squash match on record. The first game itself was a record for the longest single game in a squash match, as Awad recovered from 1–8 down to take the game 10–9 in 1 hour and 11 minutes. In the end, Jahangir won the match 9–10, 9–5, 9–7, 9–2 in 2 hours and 46 minutes.

His first major open final was the 1980 World Masters title where he lost to Mohibullah Khan in the final.

He achieved the highest ranking of his career, World No. 3, in January 1984. Awad retired from the professional squash circuit in 1987, following problems with knee injuries.

Awad's acrobatic performances on the squash court earned him the nicknames "rubber man" and "grasshopper". He died of a heart attack on 6 November 2004 in Alexandria at the age of 49.
