= Stuart Davenport =

New Zealand squash player (born 1962)

Personal information
- Nationality: New Zealander
- Born: 21 September 1962 (age 63) Auckland, New Zealand
- Height: 193 cm (6 ft 4 in)

Sport
- Handedness: Right-Handed
- Coached by: Dardir El Bakary
- Retired: 1987
- Racquet used: Dunlop

Men's Singles
- Highest ranking: 3 (February 1986)
- Titles: 1983 NZ Open, 1986 US Open
Medal record
Men's squash
Representing New Zealand
World Championships
| Bronze medal – third place | 1983 Munich | Singles |

Stuart Davenport (born 21 September 1962) is a New Zealand former professional squash player. He reached his career's highest ranking of World No. 3 in February 1986.

== Biography ==
Davenport learned to play squash in Christchurch, and was an outstanding junior (particularly after a growth spurt aided the physical side of his game after the age of 15). Coached by the legendary Dardir El Bakary, Davenport developed an attacking game with the full array of volleys and attacking strokeplay.

In 1980 he led the New Zealand Junior team to third place at the World Junior Championship in Sweden (after finishing third himself in the individual event). That same year he won the British under-19 title, and in 1982 took out the British under-23 championships.

Davenport was based in Beaconsfield, England and was one of the tallest players on the circuit, being 6 feet 4 inches.

During his senior professional career he finished third in the World Individual Championships held in New Zealand in 1983, and several outstanding efforts for New Zealand in World Team Championships events.

Davenport became the chairman of the International Squash Players' Association but in November 1987 announced his intention to retire from international squash aged just 25.
