= Phil Kenyon =

English squash player

Personal information
- Nationality: British (English)
- Born: 7 May 1956 (age 70) Blackpool, England

Sport

Men's singles
- Highest ranking: No. 4 (February 1987)
Medal record
Men's squash
Representing Great Britain
World Team Championships
Gold medal – first place	1979 Brisbane	Team
Representing England
European Team Championships
Gold medal – first place	1976 Brussels	Team
Gold medal – first place	1978 Amsterdam	Team
Gold medal – first place	1979 Hamburg	Team
Gold medal – first place	1982 Cardiff	Team
World Amateur Championship
Silver medal – second place	1979 Melbourne	Singles

Philip Kenyon (born 7 May 1956) is a former English professional squash player.

== Biography ==
Born in Blackpool, Kenyon finished runner-up behind Jahangir Khan in the 1979 World Amateur Squash Championship held in Melbourne, Australia. Kenyon was part of the British team with Jonathan Leslie, Peter Verow and Andrew Dwyer that won the 1979 Men's World Team Squash Championships in Brisbane, Australia.

He became the English number one in 1982 and was still the England number 1 at the end of the 1985/86 season.

He also represented England at the 1981, 1983 & 1985 World Team Squash Championships.

Kenyon won four gold medals for the England men's national squash team at the European Squash Team Championships in 1976, 1978, 1979 and 1982.

Kenyon was four-times British national champion in 1977, 1981, 1983 and 1985.
