= Gawain Briars =

British squash player and lawyer

Personal information
- Born: 4 April 1958 (age 68) Witney, Oxfordshire, England

Sport
- Country: England
- Highest ranking: No.4 (February 1986)
Medal record
Men's squash
Representing England
World Championships
Bronze medal – third place	1985 Cairo	Singles
European Team Championships
Gold medal – first place	1978 Amsterdam	Team
Gold medal – first place	1979 Hamburg	Team
Gold medal – first place	1982 Cardiff	Team
Silver medal – second place	1983 Munich	Team
Gold medal – first place	1986 Aix-en-Provence	Team

Gawain Peter Briars (born 4 April 1958) is a sportsman and lawyer in the United Kingdom. In the world of squash, he has won several major international titles and served as executive director of the Professional Squash Association.

== Biography ==
Born in Witney, Briars learnt to play squash at Gresham's School, Holt, which he attended from 1968 to 1976, and became a professional squash player on leaving school at the age of eighteen, continuing as a professional until 1989.

He became the British number one player in 1985, and at the top of his career was the fourth-ranked squash player in the world. He won titles in the US, France, Canada, New Zealand, Australia, Monte Carlo, Singapore and Malaysia, and was President of the world Professional Squash Association from 1985 to 1987. He also represented England at the 1981, 1983 & 1985 World Team Squash Championships.

Briars won four gold medals for the England men's national squash team at the European Squash Team Championships in 1978, 1979, 1982 and 1986.

Briars was the British national champion in 1979 and 1982. He also coached for the Welsh national team.

On retiring from the professional sport in 1989, Briars went to University College, Cardiff to study law, and subsequently qualified as a solicitor in 1994. He then practised as a commercial lawyer.

With effect from 1 October 1999, he was appointed as executive director of the Professional Squash Association (PSA), succeeding John Nimick, of Boston, USA, and commented: "This represents a wonderful move for me away from the legal profession, but not without relinquishing the invaluable knowledge and experience I have gained whilst practising in commercial law. This career change represents an exciting partnership of my two life careers and places me on the threshold of what I am certain will be a bright future for the professional game of squash which has provided me with so many happy memories."
