= 1980 Men's British Open Squash Championship =

British Open Squash Championships
- 42nd British Open Championships

Details
- Location: London, England
- Venue: Wembley Squash Centre & Wembley Conference Centre
- Dates: 4–13 March 1980

The 1980 Avis British Open Championships was held at the Wembley Squash Centre and the Wembley Conference Centre in London from 4–13 March 1980.
Geoff Hunt won his seventh title defeating Qamar Zaman in the final. This seventh win equalled the record previously set by Hashim Khan of Pakistan. The squash world was still recovering from the sudden deaths of Torsam Khan and Kim Bruce-Lockhart who both died from heart attacks whilst playing squash. Torsam Khan died during November 1979 and Kim Bruce-Lockhart died in January 1980.

== Seeds ==
1. (Australia) Geoff Hunt
2. (Pakistan) Qamar Zaman
3. (Pakistan) Mohibullah Khan
4. (Pakistan) Hiddy Jahan
5. (Pakistan) Gogi Alauddin
6. (Pakistan) Maqsood Ahmed
7. (New Zealand) Bruce Brownlee
8. (Republic of Ireland) Jonah Barrington
9. (Pakistan) Jahangir Khan
10. (England) Gawain Briars
11. (Egypt) Gamal Awad
12. (Pakistan) Mohammed Yasin
13. (Australia) Dean Williams
14. (Egypt) Ahmed Safwat
15. (Egypt) Mohammed Asran
16. (South Africa) Roland Watson

== Draw and results ==
=== Final ===
(Australia) Geoff Hunt beat (Pakistan) Qamar Zaman 9-3 9-2 1-9 9-1

=== Section 1 ===
First round
1 | (Australia) Geoff Hunt | 9 | 9 | 5 | 9
(Egypt) Abbas Kaoud | 1 | 6 | 9 | 5
(Pakistan) Daulat Khan | 9 | 5 | 1 | 9 | 10
(Australia) Steve Bowditch | 6 | 9 | 9 | 6 | 9
16 | (South Africa) Roland Watson | 4 | 9 | 9 | 9
(England) John Easter | 9 | 2 | 1 | 2
(Australia) Roy Ollier | 5 | 9 | 9 | 9
(England) Steve Bateman | 9 | 4 | 5 | 1
8 | (Republic of Ireland) Jonah Barrington | 9 | 9 | 9
(Egypt) Mohamed Khalifa | 1 | 1 | 2
(England) Gavin Dupre | 9 | 9 | 9 | 9
(Pakistan) Rahmat Khan | 10 | 0 | 1 | 5
9 | (Pakistan) Jahangir Khan | 9 | 9 | 9
(England) David Pearson | 6 | 4 | 5
(England) David Thomas | 7 | 9 | 9 | 2 | 9
(Pakistan) Mohammed Saleem | 9 | 1 | 6 | 9 | 3
3 | (Pakistan) Mohibullah Khan | 9 | 9 | 9
(India) Nik Senapati | 3 | 0 | 4
(Australia) Glen Brumby | 9 | 4 | 9 | 9
(South Africa) Ian Holding | 0 | 9 | 4 | 4
13 | (Australia) Dean Williams | 3 | 9 | 9 | 5 | 10
(England) Ian Robinson | 9 | 1 | 3 | 9 | 8
(Egypt) Magdi Saad | 9 | 9 | 9
(England) Joe Richardson | 1 | 2 | 3
7 | (New Zealand) Bruce Brownlee | w/o
(Egypt) Mohammed Awad
(England) Barry O'Connor | 9 | 7 | 10 | 9
(New Zealand) Brian Barnett | 7 | 9 | 8 | 0
12 | (Pakistan) Mohammed Yasin | 9 | 9 | 10
(Australia) Mark Mounsey | 3 | 3 | 8
(England) John Richardson | 9 | 4 | 9 | 9
(Egypt) Mohammed Naweto | 5 | 9 | 2 | 7

Second round
1 | (Australia) Hunt | 9 | 9 | 9
(Pakistan) D Khan | 5 | 1 | 0
16 | (South Africa) Watson | 9 | 9 | 9
(Australia) Ollier | 4 | 7 | 6
8 | (Republic of Ireland) Barrington | 9 | 9 | 9
(England) Dupre | 4 | 5 | 1
9 | (Pakistan) J Khan | 9 | 9 | 9
(England) Thomas | 1 | 6 | 5
3 | (Pakistan) M Khan | 9 | 10 | 4 | 7 | 9
(Australia) Brumby | 3 | 2 | 5
13 | (Australia) Williams | 9 | 9 | 9
(Egypt) Saad | 7 | 7 | 4
7 | (New Zealand) Brownlee | 9 | 9 | 9
(England) O'Connor | 5 | 4 | 3
12 | (Pakistan) Yasin | 9 | 9 | 10
(England) Richardson | 2 | 5 | 8

Third round
1 | (Australia) Hunt | 9 | 9 | 5 | 9
16 | (South Africa) Watson | 6 | 0 | 9 | 1
8 | (Republic of Ireland) Barrington | 9 | 4 | 9 | 9
9 | (Pakistan) J Khan | 3 | 9 | 7 | 0
3 | (Pakistan) M Khan | 9 | 9 | 9
13 | (Australia) Williams | 4 | 5 | 0
7 | (New Zealand) Brownlee | 9 | 9 | 9
12 | (Pakistan) Yasin | 1 | 5 | 4

Quarter-finals
1 | (Australia) Hunt | 9 | 9 | 7 | 9
8 | (Republic of Ireland) Barrington | 3 | 2 | 9 | 6
Semi-finals
1 | (Australia) Hunt | 9 | 9 | 9
3 | (Pakistan) M Khan | 5 | 1 | 1
3 | (Pakistan) M Khan | 9 | 9 | 9
7 | (New Zealand) Brownlee | 1 | 2 | 0

=== Section 2 ===
First round
4 | (Pakistan) Hiddy Jahan | 9 | 6 | 9 | 10
(Nigeria) Mark M'Fuk | 2 | 9 | 5 | 8
(England) John Cordeaux | 9 | 9 | 2 | 9
(Egypt) Mohammad Moustafa | 6 | 2 | 9 | 6
14 | (Egypt) Ahmed Safwat | w/o
(Sweden) Mikael Hellstrom
(Australia) Kevin Shawcross | 9 | 9 | 9
(Egypt) Alam Soliman | 7 | 0 | 5
6 | (Pakistan) Maqsood Ahmed | 9 | 9 | 9
(England) Geoffrey Hoare | 3 | 0 | 0
(England) Andrew Dwyer | 9 | 9 | 9
(Wales) Tiefon Salisbury | 3 | 4 | 1
11 | (Egypt) Gamal Awad | 10 | 9 | 9
(Sweden) Lars Kvant | 9 | 4 | 2
(Egypt) Aly Abdel Aziz | 9 | 9 | 9
(England) Jonathan Leslie | 2 | 2 | 1
5 | (Pakistan) Gogi Alauddin | 9 | 9 | 9
(Australia) Greg Pollard | 2 | 5 | 2
(Sweden) Leif Leiner | 9 | 9 | 1 | 9
(Sweden) Jan-Ulf Söderberg | 6 | 2 | 9 | 6
10 | (England) Gawain Briars | 6 | 9 | 9 | 9
(Egypt) Moussa Helal | 9 | 6 | 5 | 7
(New Zealand) Ross Norman | 10 | 9 | 9
(Australia) Ian Yeates | 9 | 0 | 2
2 | (Pakistan) Qamar Zaman | 9 | 9 | 6 | 9
(England) John Le Lievre | 4 | 4 | 9 | 1
(Pakistan) Atlas Khan | 9 | 9 | 9
(England) Paul Wright | 5 | 6 | 1
15 | (Egypt) Mohammed Asran | 10 | 9 | 9
(England) Bryan Pearson | 8 | 1 | 2
(Australia) Frank Donnelly | 5 | 1 | 10 | 9 | 9
(Australia) Roger Flynn | 9 | 9 | 9 | 1 | 4

Second round
4 | (Pakistan) Jahan | 9 | 9 | 9
(England) Cordeaux | 0 | 4 | 6
14 | (Egypt) Safwat | 3 | 9 | 9 | 5 | 9
(Australia) Shawcross | 9 | 4 | 6 | 9 | 10
6 | (Pakistan) Ahmed | 9 | 9 | 9
(England) Dwyer | 0 | 2 | 6
11 | (Egypt) Awad | 9 | 9 | 9
(Egypt) Aziz | 2 | 3 | 6
5 | (Pakistan) Alauddin | 9 | 9 | 9
(Sweden) Leiner | 7 | 2 | 3
10 | (England) Briars | 4 | 6 | 9 | 4
(New Zealand) Norma | 9 | 9 | 3 | 9
2 | (Pakistan) Zaman | 10 | 9 | 6 | 9
(Pakistan) A Khan | 8 | 1 | 9 | 1
15 | (Egypt) Asran | 6 | 9 | 9 | 4 | 9
(Australia) Donnelly | 9 | 0 | 3 | 9 | 5

Third round
4 | (Pakistan) Jahan | 9 | 10 | 5 | 9
(Australia) Shawcross | 3 | 8 | 9 | 3
6 | (Pakistan) Ahmed | 9 | 9 | 9 | 9
11 | (Egypt) Awad | 6 | 10 | 7 | 2
5 | (Pakistan) Alauddin | 9 | 9 | 9
(New Zealand) Norman | 4 | 4 | 7
2 | (Pakistan) Zaman | 9 | 9 | 9
15 | (Egypt) Asran | 6 | 0 | 5

Quarter-finals
4 | (Pakistan) Jahan | 9 | 1 | 6
6 | (Pakistan) Ahmed | 10 | 9 | 9
Semi-finals
6 | (Pakistan) Ahmed | 9 | 1 | 4 | 1
2 | (Pakistan) Zaman | 4 | 9 | 9 | 9
5 | (Pakistan) Alauddin | 1 | 9 | 9 | 1 | 3
2 | (Pakistan) Zaman | 9 | 7 | 3 | 9 | 9

| Preceded by 1979 | British Open Squash Championships; England (London); 1980 | Succeeded by 1981 |
