= 1979 Men's British Open Squash Championship =

British Open Squash Championships
- 41st British Open Championships

Details
- Location: London, England
- Venue: Wembley Squash Centre
- Dates: 31 March – 8 April 1979

The 1979 British Open Championships sponsored by Avis, was held at the Wembley Squash Centre in London from 31 March – 8 April 1979. Geoff Hunt won his sixth title defeating Qamar Zaman in a repeat of the 1978 final.

== Seeds ==
1. (Australia) Geoff Hunt
2. (Pakistan) Qamar Zaman
3. (Pakistan) Mohibullah Khan
4. (Pakistan) Hiddy Jahan
5. (Pakistan) Gogi Alauddin
6. 6
7. 7
8. (South Africa) Roland Watson
9. (Republic of Ireland) Jonah Barrington
10. 10
11. 11
12. (Pakistan) Torsam Khan
13. 13
14. 14
15. (Australia) Kevin Shawcross
16. 16

== Draw and results ==
=== First round ===
Player One	Player Two	Score
(Australia) Geoff Hunt (1)	(Pakistan) Rehmatullah Khan	9-1 9-3 5-9 9-1
(Pakistan) Qamar Zaman (2)	(Egypt) Alaaeldeen Allouba	9-2 9-4 9-5
(Pakistan) Mohibullah Khan (3)	(Egypt) Sherif Ali	9-2 9-1 9-2
(Pakistan) Hiddy Jahan (4)	(Egypt) Alam Soliman	9-10 9-5 9-1 9-2
(Pakistan) Gogi Alauddin (5)	(England) Richard Mosley	9–5 9–2 9–3
(South Africa) Roland Watson (8)	(Egypt) Mohammed Khalifa	9-4 9-2 9-5
(Republic of Ireland) Jonah Barrington (9)	(Egypt) Nasser Zahran	9-1 9-0 9-1
(Australia) Glen Brumby	(Pakistan) Torsam Khan (12)	w/o
(Australia) Kevin Shawcross (15)	(Sweden) Bosse Boström	9-2 9-6 9-5
(Pakistan) Mohammed Yasin (seed)	(Pakistan) S Zaman	9-4 9-4 9-7
(New Zealand) Bruce Brownlee (seed)	(Pakistan) Sajjad Muneer	w/o
(Pakistan) Rahim Gul	(Egypt) Ahmed Safwat (seed)	w/o
(Pakistan) Maqsood Ahmed (seed)	(England) Bryan Patterson	9-3 9-1 9-1
(Egypt) Ali Abdel Aziz (seed)	(Australia) Ricki Hill	9-6 9-1 9-5
(New Zealand) Murray Lilley (seed)	(South Africa) Selwyn Machet	9-6 10-8 6-9 9-6
(Egypt) Mo Asran	(Egypt) Abbas Kaoud	5–9 9–1 9–7 9–2
(England) Peter Verow	(Pakistan) Shah Jehan Khan	9-4 9-2 9-1
(Pakistan) Sharif Khan	(South Africa) Richard O'Connor	9-7 9-4 9-0
(England) Ian Robinson	(England) Joe Richardson	9-2 9-6 9-1
(England) John Easter	(Pakistan) Atlas Khan	w/o
(England) John Richardson	(Sweden) Peter Bostrom	9-7 9-5 9-7
(Australia) Steve Bowditch	(Scotland) Gavin Dupre	9-6 6-9 9-3 10-8
(Sweden) Johan Stockenberg	(Sweden) Sefan Winstrom	9-2 10-8 9-5
(Scotland) Kim Bruce-Lockhart	(United States) Suart Goldstein	10-8 9-0 9-4
(New Zealand) Robin Espie	(England) John Catchpole	9-7 9-4 10-8
(England) Gawain Briars	(England) John Le Lievre	10-8 9-6 9-7
(Australia) Roy Ollier	(Australia) Len Steward	9-6 8-10 9-3 9-2
(Australia) Dean Williams	(England) Paul Chaplin	9-2 9-2 9-3
(England) Moussa Helal	Andrew Dwyer	9-7 9-1 8-10 9-2
(New Zealand) Craig Blackwood	(England) Paul Wright	9-10 7-9 9-3 10-8 10-8
(Pakistan) Mohammed Saleem	(Sweden) Lars Kvant	w/o

Second round
1	(Australia) Geoff Hunt	9	9	9
(Egypt) Mo Asran	2	6	6
(England) Peter Verow
(Pakistan) Rahim Gul
5	(Pakistan) Gogi Alauddin	9	9	9
(Pakistan) Sharif Khan	4	1	6
15	(Australia) Kevin Shawcross	2	6	9	9	10
(England) Ian Robinson	9	9	4	7	9
4	(Pakistan) Hiddy Jahan
(Egypt) Gamal Awad
9	(Republic of Ireland) Jonah Barrington	9	6	9	9
(Australia) Steve Bowditch	6	9	5	5
8	(South Africa) Roland Watson	10	9	9
(England) John Richardson	8	0	0
2	(Pakistan) Qamar Zaman
(New Zealand) Murray Lilley	3	9	9	9
(England) Gawain Briars	9	3	6	1
(Pakistan) Maqsood Ahmed	3	9	9	9
(Australia) Dean Williams	9	3	0	1
(Egypt) Aly Abdel Aziz
3	(Pakistan) Mohibullah Khan
(Australia) Glen Brumby
(New Zealand) Bruce Brownlee	10	9	9	9
(Scotland) Kim Bruce-Lockhart	9	6	10	2
(Pakistan) Mohammed Yasin

Third round
1	(Australia) Hunt	9	9	5	9
(England) Verow	4	6	9	2
5	(Pakistan) Alauddin	9	9	9
15	(Australia) Shawcross	3	5	1
4	(Pakistan) Jahan	9	9	9
(Egypt) Awad	2	4	6
9	(Republic of Ireland) Barrington	7	9	9	9
8	(South Africa) Watson	9	1	2	4
2	(Pakistan) Zaman	9	9	9
(New Zealand) Lilley	3	3	4
(Pakistan) Ahmed	9	9	6	6	4
(Egypt) Abdel Aziz	4	1	6
3	(Pakistan) M Khan	9	9	9
(Australia) Brumby	1	7	2
(New Zealand) Brownlee	5	9	9	9
(Pakistan) Yasin	9	2	2	3

Quarter-finals
1	(Australia) Hunt	9	9	9
5	(Pakistan) Alauddin	6	1	7
4	(Pakistan) Jahan	9	9	9
9	(England) (Republic of Ireland) Barrington	0	4	3
2	(Pakistan) Zaman	9	5	9	7	9
(Pakistan) Maqsood A	7	9	4	9	3
3	(Pakistan) M Khan	9	9	9
(New Zealand) Brownlee	4	1	1

Semi-finals
1	(Australia) Hunt	9	9	9	9
4	(Pakistan) Jahan	3	6	10	2
Final
1	(Australia) Hunt	2	9	9	6	9
2	(Pakistan) Zaman	9	7	0	9	3
2	(Pakistan) Zaman
3	(Pakistan) M Khan

Preceded by 1978	British Open Squash Championships; England (London); 1979	Succeeded by 1980
