= 1978 Men's British Open Squash Championship =

British Open Squash Championships
- 40th British Open Championships

Details
- Location: London, England
- Venue: Wembley Squash Centre

The 1978 Avis Rent-a-Car British Open Championships was held at the Wembley Squash Centre in London from 31 March – 8 April 1978.
Geoff Hunt won his fifth title defeating Qamar Zaman in the final.

== Seeds ==
1. (Australia) Geoff Hunt
2. (Pakistan) Qamar Zaman
3. (Pakistan) Mohibullah Khan
4. (Pakistan) Gogi Alauddin
5. (Pakistan) Hiddy Jahan
6. (South Africa) Roland Watson
7. (Australia) Cameron Nancarrow
8. (Egypt) Ahmed Safwat
9. (Republic of Ireland) Jonah Barrington
10. (Pakistan) Torsam Khan
11. (New Zealand) Bruce Brownlee
12. (Egypt) Aly Abdel Aziz
13. (Pakistan) Mo Yasin
14. (Australia) Kevin Shawcross
15. (England) John Easter
16. (Pakistan) Rehmatullah Khan

== Draw and results ==
=== Final ===
(Australia) Geoff Hunt beat (Pakistan) Qamar Zaman 7-9 9-1 9-1 9-2

=== Section 1 ===
First round
1 | (Australia) Geoff Hunt | 9 | 10 | 9
(Australia) Dean Williams | 1 | 8 | 0
(England) Jonny Leslie | 9 | 1 | 2 | 9 | 10
(England) Barry O'Connor | 4 | 9 | 9 | 3 | 8
16 | (Pakistan) Rehmatullah Khan | 9 | 9 | 9
(Pakistan) Rahim Gul | 5 | 7 | 4
(Pakistan) Mohammed Saleem | 2 | 4 | 5
(England) Stuart Courtney | 9 | 9 | 9
8 | (Egypt) Ahmed Safwat | 9 | 9 | 9
(England) Mike Grundy | 0 | 8 | 1
(England) Joe Richardson | 9 | 9 | 6 | 6 | 4
(England) Ian Robinson | 4 | 7 | 9 | 9 | 9
9 | (England) (Republic of Ireland) Jonah Barrington | 10 | 9 | 9
(Egypt) Moussa Helal | 8 | 5 | 2
(Egypt) Mohammed Khalifa | 5 | 9 | 9 | 9
(Sweden) Stefan Winstrom | 9 | 2 | 2 | 3
4 | (Pakistan) Gogi Alauddin | 9 | 9 | 9
(England) Paul Millman | 4 | 1 | 5
(Egypt) Mohammed Asran | 9 | 9 | 9
(Australia) Neno Vince | 5 | 1 | 4
13 | (Pakistan) Mo Yasin | w/o
(Sweden) Lars Kvant | scr
(Pakistan) Sharif Khan | 9 | 5 | 5 | 9 | 9
(Sweden) Leif Leiner | 3 | 9 | 9 | 2 | 7
5 | (Pakistan) Hiddy Jahan | 9 | 9 | 9
(England) Dick Carter | 4 | 5 | 2
(Guernsey) John Le Lievre | w/o
(Pakistan) Atlas Khan | scr
12 | (Egypt) Ali Abdel Aziz | 9 | 9 | 9
(England) Andrew Dwyer | 2 | 1 | 1
(Egypt) Alam Soliman | 2 | 3 | 6
(Egypt) Abbas Kaoud | 9 | 9 | 9

Second round
1 | (Australia) Hunt | 9 | 10 | 9
(England) Leslie | 3 | 8 | 5
16 | (Pakistan) R Khan | 9 | 9 | 9
(England) Courtney | 1 | 4 | 4
8 | (Egypt) Safwat | 2 | 10 | 9 | 6 | 9
(England) Robinson | 9 | 9 | 0 | 9 | 2
9 | (Republic of Ireland) Barrington | 9 | 9 | 9
(Egypt) Khalifa | 1 | 2 | 1
4 | (Pakistan) Alauddin | 9 | 9 | 9
(Egypt) Asran | 2 | 0 | 2
13 | (Pakistan) Yasin | 9 | 0 | 7 | 3
(Pakistan) Sharif Khan | 3 | 9 | 9 | 9
5 | (Pakistan) Jahan | 9 | 9 | 9
(Guernsey) Le Lievre | 1 | 1 | 0
12 | (Egypt) Aziz | 9 | 5 | 9 | 9
(Egypt) Kaoud | 3 | 9 | 2 | 2

Third round
1 | (Australia) Hunt | 9 | 9 | 9
16 | (Pakistan) R Khan | 3 | 1 | 7
8 | (Egypt) Safwat | 7 | 9 | 8 | 9 | 0
9 | (Republic of Ireland) Barrington | 9 | 3 | 10 | 4 | 9
4 | (Pakistan) Alauddin | 9 | 9 | 9
13 | (Pakistan) Yasin | 1 | 3 | 2
5 | (Pakistan) Jahan | 9 | 9 | 9
12 | (Egypt) Aziz | 6 | 7 | 7

Quarter-finals
1 | (Australia) Hunt | 9 | 9 | 9
9 | (Republic of Ireland) Barrington | 3 | 2 | 5
Semi-finals
1 | (Australia) Hunt | 9 | 9 | 9
5 | (Pakistan) Jahan | 4 | 1 | 3
4 | (Pakistan) Alauddin | 4 | 7 | 4
5 | (Pakistan) Jahan | 9 | 9 | 9

=== Section 2 ===
First round
(New Zealand) Howard Broun | 9 | 9 | 9
(Sweden) Bosse Boström | 1 | 3 | 0
11 | (New Zealand) Bruce Brownlee | 9 | 2 | 9 | 9
(England) Bryan Patterson | 2 | 9 | 1 | 5
(England) Peter Verow | 9 | 9 | 9
(Australia) Glen Brumby | 6 | 4 | 2
6 | (South Africa) Roland Watson | 9 | 8 | 9 | 9
(England) Gawain Briars | 5 | 10 | 1 | 4
(England) Paul Wright | 6 | 9 | 9 | 9
(Pakistan) Shah Jahan Khan | 9 | 4 | 7 | 4
14 | (Australia) Kevin Shawcross | 10 | 9 | 0 | 9
(South Africa) Ian Holding | 9 | 4 | 9 | 2
(England) John Roe | 9 | 9 | 9
(Egypt) Muhammad Moustafa | 3 | 4 | 1
3 | (Pakistan) Mohibullah Khan | 9 | 9 | 9
(New Zealand) Craig Blackwood | 2 | 3 | 6
(New Zealand) Tony Naughton | w/o
(Australia) Billy Reedman | scr
10 | (Pakistan) Torsam Khan | 9 | 4 | 7 | 10 | 9
(Australia) Frank Donnelly | 3 | 9 | 9 | 8 | 4
(England) Phil Kenyon | 9 | 9 | 9
(England) Terry Mabbitt | 3 | 1 | 6
7 | (Australia) Cam Nancarrow | 5 | 9 | 1 | 9 | 10
(Pakistan) Maqsood Ahmed | 9 | 5 | 9 | 2 | 9
(Australia) Len Steward | w/o
(Egypt) Mohammed Awad | scr
15 | (England) John Easter | 9 | 9 | 10
(Pakistan) Amanullah Khan | 7 | 0 | 9
(Australia) Roy Ollier | 9 | 2 | 9 | 10
(South Africa) Alan Colburn | 6 | 9 | 7 | 8
2 | (Pakistan) Qamar Zaman | 9 | 9 | 9
(New Zealand) Murray Lilley | 7 | 3 | 3

Second round
(New Zealand) Broun | 5 | 3 | 7
11 | (New Zealand) Brownlee | 9 | 9 | 9
(England) Verow | 3 | 4 | 0
6 | (South Africa) Watson | 9 | 9 | 9
(England) Wright | 3 | 3 | 8
14 | (Australia) Shawcross | 9 | 9 | 10
(England) Roe | 10 | 0 | 3 | 1
3 | (Pakistan) M Khan | 8 | 9 | 9 | 9
(New Zealand) Naughton | 8 | 0 | 1
10 | (Pakistan) Torsam Khan | 10 | 9 | 9
(England) Kenyon | 6 | 3 | 9 | 2
7 | (Australia) Nancarrow | 9 | 9 | 6 | 9
(Australia) Steward | 3 | 0 | 3
15 | (England) Easter | 9 | 9 | 9
(Australia) Ollier | 2 | 2 | 2
2 | (Pakistan) Zaman | 9 | 9 | 9

Third round
11 | (New Zealand) Brownlee | 9 | 3 | 3 | 9 | 9
6 | (South Africa) Watson | 3 | 9 | 9 | 5 | 5
14 | (Australia) Shawcross | 3 | 0 | 1
3 | (Pakistan) M Khan | 9 | 9 | 9
10 | (Pakistan) Torsam Khan | 6 | 0 | 9 | 9 | 10
7 | (Australia) Nancarrow | 9 | 9 | 7 | 5 | 8
15 | (England) Easter | 6 | 2 | 2
2 | (Pakistan) Zaman | 9 | 9 | 9

Quarter-finals
11 | (New Zealand) Brownlee | 1 | 5 | 9 | 7
3 | (Pakistan) Khan M | 9 | 9 | 2 | 9
Semi-finals
3 | (Pakistan) Khan M | 5 | 1 | 7 | 7
2 | (Pakistan) Zaman | 9 | 1 | 9 | 9
10 | (Pakistan) Torsam Khan | 10 | 4 | 1 | 4
2 | (Pakistan) Zaman | 9 | 9 | 9 | 9

| Preceded by 1977 | British Open Squash Championships; England (London); 1978 | Succeeded by 1979 |
