= 1981 Men's British Open Squash Championship =

British Open Squash Championships
- 43rd British Open Championships

Details
- Location: Greater London, England
- Venue: Bromley Town Squash Centre and Churchill Theatre, Bromley
- Dates: 30 March – 9 April 1981

The 1981 Audi British Open Championships was held at the Bromley Town Squash Club with the later stages being held at the Churchill Theatre, Bromley, Greater London from 30 March – 9 April 1981.
Geoff Hunt won his eighth title defeating Jahangir Khan in the final. This eighth win set a new record surpassing the seven wins set by Hashim Khan of Pakistan.

== Seeds ==
1. (Australia) Geoff Hunt
2. (Pakistan) Qamar Zaman
3. (Pakistan) Mohibullah Khan
4. (Pakistan) Jahangir Khan
5. (Pakistan) Maqsood Ahmed
6. (Pakistan) Hiddy Jahan
7. (New Zealand) Bruce Brownlee
8. (Egypt) Gamal Awad

(Pakistan) Gogi Alauddin
(Republic of Ireland) Jonah Barrington
(England) Gawain Briars
(Australia) Dean Williams
(Australia) Steve Bowditch
(South Africa) Roland Watson - withdrew
(England) Phil Kenyon - seed 13

(New Zealand) Ross Norman - seed 14

== Draw and results ==
=== Final ===
(Australia) Geoff Hunt beat (Pakistan) Jahangir Khan 9-2 9-7 5-9 9-7

=== Section 1 ===
First round
1	(Australia) Geoff Hunt	9	9	9
(Egypt) Mohammed Awad	1	7	5
(Australia) Glen Brumby	9	9	9
(England) John Cordeaux	3	2	0
(Australia) Steve Bowditch	2	6	9	10	9
(Pakistan) Karimullah Khan	9	9	4	8	4
(Australia) Ricki Hill	9	9	6	9
(Egypt) Abbas Kaoud	5	3	9	7
13	(England) Phil Kenyon	9	9	9
(England) Christy Willstrop	7	1	1
(Pakistan) Mohammed Ali Somjee	9	9	9
(Australia) Peter Nance	4	4	6
7	(New Zealand) Bruce Brownlee	9	9	10
(South Africa) Reggie Holmes	4	2	8
(Pakistan) Fahim Gul	10	9	9
(England) Andrew Dwyer	8	4	1
8	(Egypt) Gamal Awad	9	9	9
(New Zealand) Craig Blackwood	0	3	2
(Zimbabwe) Trevor Wilkinson	9	9	5	6	10
(Sweden) Johan Stockenberg	3	4	9	9	9
(Sweden) Lars Kvant	9	9	10
(Sweden) Stefan Winstrom	4	5	8
(Australia) Frank Donnelly	9	9	9
(Pakistan) Mohammed Yasin	7	1	6
14	(New Zealand) Ross Norman	7	9	9	9
(Egypt) Alam Soliman	9	4	2	2
(England) Ian Robinson	8	2	9	9	9
(England) John Easter	10	9	2	0	1
(Egypt) Magdi Saad	9	9	9
(England) Ashley Naylor	3	6	3
3	(Pakistan) Mohibullah Khan	9	9	9
(South Africa) Chris Hewitson	1	2	5

Second round
1	(Australia) Hunt	9	9	9
(Australia) Brumby	1	0	3
(Australia) Bowditch	9	9	5	2
(Australia) Hill	6	5	9	2
13	(England) Kenyon	9	9	9
(Pakistan) Somjee	5	4	4
7	(New Zealand) Brownlee	9	7	9	10
(Pakistan) Fahim Gul	5	9	5	8
8	(Egypt) Awad	9	9	9
(Zimbabwe) Wilkinson	6	1	6
(Sweden) Kvant	9	9	9
(Australia) Donnelly	1	2	3
14	(New Zealand) Norman	10	9	9
(England) Robinson	8	0	3
(Egypt) Saad	9	2
3	(Pakistan) Mohibullah Khan	5	1	ret

Third round
1	(Australia) Hunt	9	9	9
(Australia) Bowditch	6	7	6
13	(England) Kenyon	9	9	9
7	(New Zealand) Brownlee	1	5	7
8	(Egypt) Awad	9	9	9
(Sweden) Kvant	7	5	2
14	(New Zealand) Norman	9	9	9
(Egypt) Saad	3	2	2

Quarter-finals
1	(Australia) Hunt	9	9	9
13	(England) Kenyon	4	3	2
Semi-finals
1	(Australia) Hunt	9	9	9	9
8	(Egypt) Awad	10	1	0	0
8	(Egypt) Awad	9	7	9	9
14	(New Zealand) Norman	4	9	2	1

=== Section 2 ===
First round
4	(Pakistan) Jahangir Khan	9	9	9
(Zimbabwe) Mike Sherren	7	0	1
(Pakistan) Sohail Qaiser	9	9	9
(England) Geoff Williams	6	1	0
(Australia) Dean Williams	9	9	9
(Pakistan) Zarak Jahan Khan	3	1	5
(England) Paul Chaplin	9	9	9
(Sweden) Bosse Boström	4	5	6
6	(Pakistan) Hiddy Jahan	9	9	2	9
(Egypt) Aly Abdel Aziz	6	7	9	0
(Sweden) Peter Bostrom	10	9	9
(Egypt) Mohammed Asran	8	2	6
(Pakistan) Gogi Alauddin	9	9	9
(Australia) Ian Yeates	0	3	7
(Pakistan) Jamshed Gul	10	9	3	9
(Australia) Kevin Shawcross	8	6	9	4
2	(Pakistan) Qamar Zaman	9	9	9
(Egypt) Moussa Helal	1	3	6
(Australia) Chris Dittmar	9	4	9	9
(Sweden) Mikael Hellstrom	4	9	0	2
(England) Gawain Briars
(England) Steve Bateman	5	7	9	9
(Guernsey) John Le Lievre	9	9	3	7
5	(Pakistan) Maqsood Ahmed	10	9	9
(Egypt) Ahmed Safwat	9	0	4
(Pakistan) Atlas Khan	9	4	9	9
(Sweden) Leif Leiner	2	9	7	5
(Pakistan) Daulat Khan	w/o
(Republic of Ireland) Jonah Barrington	scr
(England) Peter Verow

Second round
4	(Pakistan) Jahangir Khan	9	9	9
(Pakistan) Qaiser	2	3	7
(Australia) Williams	9	9	9
(England) Chaplin	8	6	5
6	(Pakistan) Jahan	9	9	9
(Sweden) Bostrom P	1	3	6
(Pakistan) Alauddin	9	9	9
(Pakistan) Jamshed Gul	5	0	0
2	(Pakistan) Zaman	9	9	9
(Australia) Dittmar	3	5	5
(England) Briars	9	9	9
(England) Bateman	7	0	6
5	(Pakistan) Maqsood A	7	9	9	9
(Pakistan) Atlas Khan	9	3	5	1
(Pakistan) Daulat Khan	9	7	9	9
(England) Verow	1	9	4	6

Third round
4	(Pakistan) Jahangir Khan	9	9	9
(Australia) Williams	3	0	0
6	(Pakistan) Jahan	1	10	9	9
(Pakistan) Alauddin	9	8	0	1
2	(Pakistan) Zaman	9	5	9	1	9
(England) Briars	5	9	1	9	2
5	(Pakistan) Maqsood A	9	9	9
(Pakistan) Daulat Khan	5	2	5

Quarter-finals
4	(Pakistan) Jahangir Khan	9	9	9
6	(Pakistan) Jahan	4	2	6
Semi-finals
4	(Pakistan) Jahangir Khan	5	5	7
2	(Pakistan) Zaman	9	9	9
2	(Pakistan) Zaman	9	4	10	9
5	(Pakistan) Maqsood A	6	4	9	6

Preceded by 1980	British Open Squash Championships; England (London); 1981	Succeeded by 1982
