= 1975 Men's British Open Squash Championship =

British Open Squash Championships
- 37th British Open Championships

Details
- Location: London, England
- Venue: Wembley Squash Centre

The 1975 Benson & Hedges British Open Championships was held at Wembley Squash Centre in London from 30 January – 7 February 1975.
Qamar Zaman won the title defeating Gogi Alauddin in the final.

== Seeds ==
1. (Australia) Geoff Hunt
2. (Australia) Cam Nancarrow
3. (Pakistan) Gogi Alauddin
4. (Pakistan) Hiddy Jahan
5. (Pakistan) Mohibullah Khan
6. (Republic of Ireland) Jonah Barrington
7. (Australia) Ken Hiscoe
8. (Pakistan) Qamar Zaman

== Draw and results ==
=== Final ===
(Pakistan) Qamar Zaman beat (Pakistan) Gogi Alauddin 9-7 9-6 9-1

=== Third Place ===
(Australia) Ken Hiscoe beat (Pakistan) Hiddy Jahan 9-5 9-2 8-10 9-4

=== Section 1 ===
First round
1 | (Australia) Geoff Hunt | 9 | 9 | 9
(Australia) David Jackman | 3 | 1 | 1
(Egypt) Mohamed Khalifa | 9 | 9 | 9
(England) Alf Droy | 0 | 0 | 2
(Australia) Bill Reedman | 9 | 9 | 9
(England) Charles Booth | 1 | 3 | 2
(Australia) Kevin Shawcross | 9 | 9 | 7 | 6 | 9
(New Zealand) Neven Barbour | 6 | 7 | 9 | 9 | 6
8 | (Pakistan) Qamar Zaman | 9 | 9 | 9
(Egypt) Aly Abdel Aziz | 4 | 4 | 3
(England) Paul Millman | w/o
(Pakistan) Sajjad Muneer | scr
(England) Philip Ayton | 10 | 9 | 9
(South Africa) Kevin Dowling | 8 | 1 | 4
(Egypt) Abbas Kaoud | 9 | 9 | 9
(India) Abdul Rashid | 5 | 2 | 1
4 | (Pakistan) Hiddy Jahan | 9 | 9 | 9
(Egypt) Kamal Ibrahim | 6 | 7 | 8
(New Zealand) Bruce Brownlee | 9 | 9 | 9 | 9 | 9
(Papua New Guinea) Peter Chard | 3 | 4 | 10 | 10 | 7
(England) John Easter | 9 | 9 | 10
(England) Tony Swift | 0 | 2 | 8
(England) James Beattie | 9 | 9 | 9
(England) Brian Wise | 0 | 0 | 1
5 | (Pakistan) Mohibullah Khan | 9 | 9 | 9
(Australia) Tom Connor | 1 | 1 | 1
(England) Mike Corby | 9 | 9 | 9
(Pakistan) Zahir Hussein Khan | 0 | 1 | 3
(Egypt) Mohamed Asran | 9 | 9 | 9
(New Zealand) Trevor Colyer | 3 | 0 | 3
(Pakistan) Rehmat Khan | 9 | 9 | 9
(England) T Prateley | 4 | 5 | 3

Second round
1 | (Australia) Hunt | 9 | 9 | 9
(Egypt) Khalifa | 6 | 0 | 0
(Australia) Reedman | 9 | 7 | 10 | 9
(Australia) Shawcross | 7 | 9 | 9 | 2
8 | (Pakistan) Zaman | 9 | 9 | 9
(England) Millman | 1 | 3 | 6
(England) Ayton | 10 | 9 | 9
(Egypt) Kaoud | 8 | 7 | 1
4 | (Pakistan) Jahan | 7 | 9 | 9 | 9
(New Zealand) Brownlee | 9 | 4 | 5 | 2
(England) Easter | 9 | 9 | 9
(England) Beattie | 1 | 1 | 1
5 | (Pakistan) M Khan | 9 | 9 | 9
(England) Corby | 4 | 0 | 2
(Egypt) Asran | 9 | 9 | 9
(Pakistan) Rehmat Khan | 2 | 5 | 4

Third round
1 | (Australia) Hunt | 0 | 9 | 9 | 10
(Australia) Reedman | 2 | 0 | 3
8 | (Pakistan) Zaman | 2 | 9 | 9 | 9
(England) Ayton | 9 | 2 | 0 | 1
4 | (Pakistan) Jahan | 4 | 9 | 9 | 9
(England) Easter | 9 | 5 | 4 | 4
5 | (Pakistan) M Khan | 9 | 5 | 9 | 9
(Egypt) Asran | 2 | 9 | 4 | 2

Quarter-finals
1 | (Australia) Hunt | 9 | 10 | 5 | 2 | 7
8 | (Pakistan) Zaman | 4 | 8 | 9 | 9 | 9
Semi-finals
8 | (Pakistan) Zaman | 9 | 9 | 6 | 9
4 | (Pakistan) Jahan | 4 | 2 | 9 | 4
4 | (Pakistan) Jahan | 10 | 9 | 7 | 10
5 | (Pakistan) M Khan | 8 | 3 | 9 | 8

=== Section 2 ===
First round
3 | (Pakistan) Gogi Alauddin | 9 | 9 | 9
(England) John Richardson | 0 | 0 | 1
(England) Terry Mabbitt | 9 | 9 | 9
(Nigeria) Mark M'Fuk | 6 | 2 | 1
(Egypt) Ahmed Safwat | 9 | 9 | 9
(Egypt) Galal Allam | 1 | 1 | 7
(South Africa) Mike Nathanson | 6 | 9 | 9
(India) Hisamud Din | 4 | 1 | 5
6 | (Republic of Ireland) (England) Jonah Barrington | 9 | 9 | 9
(Scotland) Kim Bruce-Lockhart | 5 | 2 | 1
(England) Paul Wright | 9 | 4 | 9 | 9
(England) Richard Leslie | 7 | 9 | 2 | 4
(Pakistan) Mohammed Yasin | 9 | 9 | 9
(England) Clive Francis | 0 | 4 | 3
(Pakistan) Abbas Khan | 9 | 9 | 9
(India) I Din | 4 | 6 | 4
7 | (Australia) Ken Hiscoe | 9 | 9 | 9
(England) Peter Goldson | 1 | 2 | 5
(Pakistan) Atlas Khan | 9 | 9 | 9
(England) Jonathon Yorke-Long | 5 | 2 | 4
(Pakistan) Mohammad Saleem | 9 | 6 | 10 | 9
(England) Ian Robinson | 3 | 9 | 8 | 1
(England) Jonathan Leslie | 9 | 9 | 9
(England) D P Morgan | 5 | 4 | 5
2 | (Australia) Cameron Nancarrow | 9 | 9 | 9
(England) Hugh Colburn | 5 | 1 | 0
(Egypt) E Maasarany | 9 | 9 | 9
(Egypt) Ahmed Nadi | 2 | 0 | 0
(Pakistan) Torsam Khan | 9 | 9 | 9
(England) Mike Grundy | 0 | 4 | 0
(Pakistan) Rehmatullah Khan | 9 | 9 | 9
(England) Cliff Roe | 2 | 6 | 3

Second round
3 | (Pakistan) Alauddin | 9 | 9 | 9
(England) Mabbitt | 2 | 7 | 3
(Egypt) Safwat | 9 | 9 | 9
(South Africa) Nathanson | 7 | 3 | 6
6 | (Republic of Ireland) (England) Barrington | 9 | 9 | 9
(England) Wright | 0 | 0 | 1
(Pakistan) Yasin | 9 | 9 | 9
(Pakistan) Abbas Khan | 3 | 4 | 6
7 | (Australia) Hiscoe | 9 | 9 | 9
(Pakistan) Atlas Khan | 2 | 4 | 2
(Pakistan) Saleem | 9 | 9 | 10
(England) Leslie | 1 | 4 | 9
2 | (Australia) Nancarrow
(Egypt) Maasarany
(Pakistan) Torsam Khan
(Pakistan) Rehmatullah Khan

Third round
3 | (Pakistan) Alauddin | 9 | 9 | 9
(Egypt) Safwat | 6 | 1 | 0
6 | (Republic of Ireland) (England) Barrington | 9 | 9 | 9
(Pakistan) Yasin | 4 | 3 | 4
7 | (Australia) Hiscoe | 9 | 9 | 9
(Pakistan) Saleem | 4 | 0 | 5
2 | (Australia) Nancarrow | 3 | 9 | 10 | 6 | 9
(Pakistan) Torsam Khan | 9 | 7 | 8 | 9 | 0

Quarter-finals
3 | (Pakistan) Alauddin | 9 | 9 | 9
6 | (Republic of Ireland) (England) Barrington | 3 | 6 | 0
Semi-finals
3 | (Pakistan) Alauddin | 9 | 9 | 9
7 | (Australia) Hiscoe | 3 | 5 | 5
7 | (Australia) Hiscoe | 9 | 5 | 6 | 9 | 9
2 | (Australia) Nancarrow | 4 | 9 | 9 | 2 | 6

| Preceded by 1974 | British Open Squash Championships; England (London); 1975 | Succeeded by 1976 |
