= 1979 Men's World Open Squash Championship =

Squash event

Men's World Open 1979
- 3rd PSA World Squash Championship
- Location: Toronto, Canada
- Date: 20–30 September 1979

PSA World Tour
- Category: World Open

Results
- Champion: (Australia) Geoff Hunt
- Runner-up: (Pakistan) Qamar Zaman
- Semi-finalists: (Pakistan) Mohibullah Khan (Pakistan) Maqsood Ahmed

The 1979 McGuinness Men's World Open Squash Championship was the men's edition of the 1979 World Open, which serves as the individual world championship for squash players. The event took place in Toronto in Canada, from 20 to 30 September 1979. Geoff Hunt won his third consecutive World Open title, defeating Qamar Zaman in a repeat of the 1977 final.

The event was the third 'Open' event billed as the world championship. Previously the British Open had been considered the primary event in squash. The World Amateur Squash Championship continued to run in addition to the Open event until 1980.

== Seeds ==
1. (Australia) Geoff Hunt (Champion)
2. (Pakistan) Qamar Zaman (Final)
3. (Pakistan) Hiddy Jahan (Quarterfinals)
4. (Pakistan) Mohibullah Khan (Semifinals)
5. (Pakistan) Gogi Alauddin (Quarterfinals)
6. (Pakistan) Maqsood Ahmed (Semifinals)
7. (New Zealand) Bruce Brownlee (Quarterfinals)
8. (South Africa) Roland Watson (Quarterfinals)
9. (Republic of Ireland) Jonah Barrington (withdrew injured)
10. (Egypt) Aly Abdel Aziz
11. (Pakistan) Torsam Khan
12. (New Zealand) Murray Lilley
13. (Pakistan) Mo Yasin
14. (Australia) Kevin Shawcross
15. (England) John Easter
16. (Egypt) Mo Asran

== Draw and results ==
=== First round ===
Player One	Player Two	Score
(Australia) Geoff Hunt (1)	(Canada) John Frittenburg	9-2 9-2 9-3
(Pakistan) Qamar Zaman (2)	(Canada) Sharif Khan	9-2 9-3 9-3
(Pakistan) Hiddy Jahan (3)	(England) Ian Robinson	9-7 9-7 10-8
(Pakistan) Mohibullah Khan (4)	(Pakistan) Shah Jehan Khan	9-5 9-5 9-4
(Pakistan) Gogi Alauddin (5)	(Australia) Len Atkins	9-5 10-8 9-7
(Pakistan) Maqsood Ahmed (6)	(South Africa) Selwyn Matchett	9-0 9-1 9-2
(New Zealand) Bruce Brownlee (7)	(Pakistan) Abbas Khan	w/o
(South Africa) Roland Watson (8)	(Pakistan) Rehmat Khan	9-5 9-4 9-3
(Australia) Steve Bowditch	(Egypt) Aly Abdel Aziz (10)	4-9 3-9 9-7 9-6 10-8
(Pakistan) Torsam Khan (11)	(Canada) Steve Moysey	9-1 9-3 9-0
(New Zealand) Murray Lilley (12)	(Canada) John Lennard	9-1 9-4 9-2
(Pakistan) Mo Yasin (13)	(Australia) Billy Reedman	9-5 9-7 9-6
(Australia) Kevin Shawcross (14)	(Canada) Todd Binns	9-7 9-1 9-1
(England) John Easter (15)	(Nigeria) Mark M'Fuk	9-4 9-4 10-9
(Egypt) Mo Asran (16)	(England) Richard Mosley	9-0 9-1 9-6
(England) Gawain Briars	(New Zealand) Howard Broun	7-9 8-10 9-2 9-0 9-1
(Egypt) Mohamed Khalifa	(Canada) Aziz Khan	1-9 5-9 9-7 9-0 9-4
(England) John Le Lievre	(Pakistan) Atlas Khan	9-6 9-2 9-10 2-9 9-3
(Canada) Michael Desaulniers	(Canada) Liaqat Ali 'Charlie' Khan	9-2 9-1 9-2
(Mexico) Mario Sanchez	(Canada) Patrick Richardson	8-10 9-6 9-2 9-7
(England) Bryan Patterson	(Canada) Doug Whittaker	9-1 9-2 9-3
(England) Rob Shay	(Canada) Charlie Booth	10-8 9-6 3-9 9-6
(England) Bryan Pearson	(United States) Stuart Goldstein	9-4 10-9 3-9 9-5
(Egypt) Moussa Helal	(Canada) Ian Shaw	9-2 9-1 9-1
(Canada) Tony Swift	(Pakistan) Zahir Hussein Khan	9-6 9-0 4-9 9-0
(Canada) Clive Caldwell	(England) Arthur Hough	9-5 9-7 9-6
(England) Paul Wright	(Canada) David Morgan	9-1 9-3 9-5
(Canada) Jug Walia	(Canada) Bill McDonnell	9-6 9-6 10-8
(Australia) Roy Ollier	(Australia) John Macrury	9-7 9-5 9-6
(Canada) Steve Hisey	(Canada) Mike Gallagher	9-2 9-6 9-6
(Egypt) Abbas Kaoud	(South Africa) Alan Colburn	0-9 9-5 1-9 9-0 9-4
(Canada) Gordon Anderson	(Canada) Jackson Triggs	9-2 9-7 9-0

=== Main draw ===
Second round
1	(Australia) Geoff Hunt	9	9	9
(Egypt) Mohamed Khalifa	6	6	3
15	(England) John Easter	7	10	4	1
(Egypt) Abbas Kaoud	9	8	9	9
8	(South Africa) Roland Watson	5	9	9	9
(Egypt) Moussa Helal	9	3	0	3
13	(Pakistan) Mo Yasin	w/o
(Canada) Clive Caldwell	scr
4	(Pakistan) Mohibullah Khan	9	9	9
(Mexico) Mario Sanchez	1	1	3
12	(New Zealand) Murray Lilley	9	9	9
(Canada) Tony Swift	2	0	0
5	(Pakistan) Gogi Alauddin	9	8	9	10
(England) Bryan Patterson	3	10	5	8
(Australia) Steve Bowditch	?	?	?
(Australia) Roy Ollier	?	?	?
2	(Pakistan) Qamar Zaman	9	9	9
(Guernsey) John Le Lievre	2	2	3
(England) Gawain Briars	9	9	9
(Canada) Gordon Anderson	5	6	3
7	(New Zealand) Bruce Brownlee	10	9	9
(England) Bryan Pearson	8	0	2
11	(Pakistan) Torsam Khan	10	9	9
(England) Paul Wright	8	6	7
3	(Pakistan) Hiddy Jahan	9	9	9
(Canada) Michael Desaulniers	5	0	1
16	(Egypt) Mo Asran	9	9	9
(Canada) Jug Walia	4	5	4
6	(Pakistan) Maqsood Ahmed	10	9	9
(South Africa) Bob Shay	8	2	6
14	(Australia) Kevin Shawcross	9	9	9
(Canada) Steve Hisey	4	1	4

Third round
1	(Australia) Hunt	9	9	9
(Egypt) Kaoud	4	0	3
8	(South Africa) Watson	9	9	9
13	(Pakistan) Yasin	1	5	2
4	(Pakistan) M Khan	9	6	9	9
12	(New Zealand) Lilley	3	9	5	1
5	(Pakistan) Alauddin	9	8	9	9
(Australia) Bowditch	1	10	3	0
2	(Pakistan) Zaman	9	1	9	9
(England) Briars	1	9	4	6
7	(New Zealand) Brownlee	9	9	9
11	(Pakistan) T Khan	2	5	3
3	(Pakistan) Jahan	9	9	9
16	(Egypt) Asran	7	7	5
6	(Pakistan) Ahmed	9	9	8	9
14	(Australia) Shawcross	2	4	10	3

Quarter-finals
1	(Australia) Hunt	9	9	5	9
8	(South Africa) Watson	6	0	9	7
4	(Pakistan) M Khan	5	9	9	9
5	(Pakistan) Alauddin	9	3	2	4
2	(Pakistan) Zaman	9	9	9
7	(New Zealand) Brownlee	1	4	6
3	(Pakistan) Jahan	9	4	6	9	4
6	(Pakistan) Ahmed	4	9	9	7	9

Semi-finals
1	(Australia) Hunt	9	9	9
4	(Pakistan) M Khan	3	0	2
Final
1	(Australia) Hunt	9	9	9
2	(Pakistan) Zaman	2	3	4
2	(Pakistan) Zaman	9	9	9	6	9
6	(Pakistan) Ahmed	7	10	4	9	4

=== Notes ===
Torsam Khan died just two months after this event in the November, at the age of 27. Torsam suffered a heart attack during a tournament in Australia.

== See also ==
- PSA World Open
- 1979 Women's World Open Squash Championship

Preceded by Australia (Adelaide); 1977	World Open; Canada (Toronto); 1979	Succeeded by Adelaide (Australia); 1980
