= 1976 Men's World Open Squash Championship =

Squash tournament

Men's World Open 1976
- 1st PSA World Squash Championship
- Location: London, England
- Date: 31 January - 7 February1976

PSA World Tour
- Category: World Open
- Prize money: £ 10,000

Results
- Champion: (Australia) Geoff Hunt
- Runner-up: (Pakistan) Mohibullah Khan
- Semi-finalists: (Pakistan) Qamar Zaman (Pakistan) Gogi Alauddin

The 1976 Lucas Industries Men's World Open Squash Championship was the inaugural men's edition of the 1976 World Open, which serves as the individual world championship for squash players. The event took place in London in England, from 31 January to 7 February 1976. Geoff Hunt won his first World Open title, defeating Mohibullah Khan in the final that lasted 130 minutes.

The championship of 1976 also served as the British Open for that year.

The event was the first 'Open' event billed as the world championship. Previously the British Open had been considered the primary event in squash. The World Amateur Squash Championship continued to run in addition to the Open event until 1980.

== Seeds ==
1. (Pakistan) Qamar Zaman (Semifinals)
2. (Australia) Geoff Hunt (Champion)
3. (Pakistan) Gogi Alauddin
4. (Pakistan) Mohibullah Khan
5. (Pakistan) Hiddy Jahan
6. (Australia) Ken Hiscoe
7. (Australia) Cam Nancarrow
8. (Republic of Ireland) Jonah Barrington

== Draw and results ==
=== Section 1 ===
First round
1	(Pakistan) Qamar Zaman	9	9	9
(Australia) Dean Williams	5	0	2
(Egypt) Sherif Aly	9	9	9
(Egypt) A Mottelb-Hussein	0	0	0
(Egypt) Mohammed Asran	9	9	9
(Scotland) Gavin Dupre	5	5	3
(Egypt) Galal Allam	9	9	9
(Pakistan) Rehmat Khan	2	2	3
8	(Republic of Ireland) Jonah Barrington	9	9	9
(England) Bryan Patterson	3	3	3
(England) Mike Grundy	9	9	9
(England) Nigel Faulks	3	6	5
(Pakistan) Mo Yasin	9	9	9
(England) Mike Corby	1	5	3
(Egypt) Mohamed Khalifa	9	9	9
(England) Paul Wright	6	0	2

Second round
1	(Pakistan) Zaman	9	9	9
(Egypt) Sherif Aly	2	1	5
(Egypt) Asran	9	9	9
(Egypt) Allam	5	1	1
8	(Republic of Ireland) Barrington	9	9	9
(England) Grundy	1	5	5
(Pakistan) Yasin	9	9	9
(Egypt) Khalifa	6	0	2

Third round
1	(Pakistan) Zaman	9	9	9
(Egypt) Asran	5	3	5
8	(Republic of Ireland) Barrington	5	10	9	9
(Pakistan) Yasin	9	8	1	4

Quarter finals
1	(Pakistan) Zaman	9	9	9
8	(Republic of Ireland) Barrington	0	1	6

=== Section 2 ===
First round
4	(Pakistan) Mohibullah Khan	9	9	9
(England) Pat Kirton	0	0	4
(Pakistan) Shah Jehan Khan	9	9	9
(Egypt) A Meguid	4	1	2
(South Africa) Roland Watson	9	9	9
(Pakistan) Amanullah Khan	5	0	0
(Australia) Frank Donnelly	9	9	8	9
(New Zealand) Craig Blackwood	3	5	10	2
5	(Pakistan) Hiddy Jahan	9	9	9
(Australia) Michael Donnelly	3	2	7
(Scotland) Kim Bruce-Lockhart	9	9	9
(England) Richard Leslie	4	5	2
(Australia) Bill Reedman	6	9	9	9
(England) Paul Millman	9	5	0	4
(England) Peter Verow	9	9	9
(England) Jonathon Yorke-Long	5	7	3

Second round
4	(Pakistan) M Khan	9	9	9
(Pakistan) S J Khan	3	7	6
(South Africa) Watson	9	9	9
(Australia) Donnelly	4	6	2
5	(Pakistan) Jahan	9	9	9
(Scotland) Bruce-Lockhart
(Australia) Reedman	9	9	9
(England) Verow	5	4	2

Third round
4	(Pakistan) M Khan	9	9	7	9
(South Africa) Watson	6	1	7	2
5	(Pakistan) Jahan	10	9	9
(Australia) Reedman	9	3	6

Quarter finals
4	(Pakistan) M Khan	6	9	4	9	9
5	(Pakistan) Jahan	9	1	9	7	1

=== Section 3 ===
First round
3	(Pakistan) Gogi Alauddin	9	9	9
(Pakistan) Mohamed Saleem	2	0	3
(England) Ian Robinson	9	9	9
(Scotland) Chris Wilson	6	3	8
(Egypt) Aly Abdel Aziz	9	9	9	9
(Australia) Kevin Shawcross	10	5	6	0
(Egypt) Abbas Kaoud	4	9	9	9
(England) Bryan Pearson	9	6	2	0
6	(Australia) Ken Hiscoe	7	9	9	9
(England) Bob Johnson	9	5	5	2
(Egypt) Gamal Awad	10	9	9
(South Africa) Richard O'Connor	9	6	4
(Pakistan) Torsam Khan	9	9	5
(England) Anthony Swift	5	7	0	ret
(Australia) Kim Richards	w/o
(England) John Easter	scr

Second round
3	(Pakistan) Alauddin	9	9	9
(England) Robinson	3	5	2
(Egypt) Aziz	8	9	6	9	9
(Egypt) Kaoud	10	4	9	2	6
6	(Australia) Hiscoe	10	9	4	9
(Egypt) Awad	8	5	9	6
(Pakistan) T Khan	9	9	4	9
(Australia) Richards	0	1	4	0

Third round
3	(Pakistan) Alauddin	9	9	9
(Egypt) Aziz	5	1	5
6	(Australia) Hiscoe	9	10	6	9
(Pakistan) T Khan	5	8	9	5

Quarter finals
3	(Pakistan) Alauddin	5	9	9	9
6	(Australia) Hiscoe	9	0	2	1

=== Section 4 ===
First round
7	(Australia) Cam Nancarrow	9	9	9
(Pakistan) Afzal Khan	3	1	4
(United States) Bill Andruss	9	9	9
(England) Nick Topman	0	2	0
(Egypt) Ahmed Safwat	7	6	9	9	9
(Egypt) Moussa Helal	9	9	4	7	1
(Pakistan) Rahim Gul	10	9	9
(England) Barry O'Connor	9	6	4
(South Africa) Ian Holding	6	9	10	9
(Pakistan) Rehmatullah Khan	9	0	8	7
(England) Mike Thurgur	6	9	9	9
(England) Dick Carter	9	5	1	5
(Pakistan) Hassan Mahmoud	9	8	3	9	9
(New Zealand) Tony Naughton	4	10	9	4	4
(England) Clive Francis	1	5	0
2	(Australia) Geoff Hunt	9	9	9

Second round
7	(Australia) Nancarrow	9	9	9
(United States) Andruss	5	4	6
(Egypt) Safwat	5	1	9	9	9
(Pakistan) Rahim Gul	9	9	5	2	3
(South Africa) Holding	9	9	5	10
(England) Thurgur	0	1	9	8
(Pakistan) Mahmoud	0	2	4
2	(Australia) Hunt	9	9	9

Third round
7	(Australia) Nancarrow	8	9	9	9
(Egypt) Safwat	10	5	7	6
(South Africa) Holding	3	5	2
2	(Australia) Hunt	9	9	9

Quarter finals
7	(Australia) Nancarrow	5	6	4
2	(Australia) Hunt	9	9	9

== Semi-finals & Final ==
Semi-finals
1	(Pakistan) Qamar Zaman	9	5	9	2	7
4	(Pakistan) Mohibullah Khan	6	9	3	9	9
3	(Pakistan) Gogi Alauddin	2	5	9	5
2	(Australia) Geoff Hunt	9	9	1	9

Final
4	(Pakistan) Mohibullah Khan	9	4	10	2	2
2	(Australia) Geoff Hunt	7	9	8	9	9

=== Notes ===
This was the inaugural World Open that doubled up as the British Open.
Held at Wembley a record prize fund of £10,000 was put forward for this first professional World Open.

== See also ==
- PSA World Open

Preceded by None; First edition	World Open; England (London); 1976	Succeeded by Australia (Adelaide); 1977
