= 1973 Men's British Open Squash Championship =

British Open Squash Championships
- 35th British Open Championships

Details
- Location: Sheffield, England
- Venue: Abbeydale Park

The 1973 Benson & Hedges British Open Championships was held at Abbeydale Park in Sheffield from 27 January – 2 February 1973.
Jonah Barrington won his sixth title defeating Gogi Alauddin in the final. This sixth success took him to just one behind the record set by Hashim Khan, but it was also to be the last title victory for Barrington.

== Seeds ==
1. (Republic of Ireland) Jonah Barrington
2. (Australia) Geoff Hunt
3. (Pakistan) Gogi Alauddin
4. (Australia) Ken Hiscoe
5. (Pakistan) Hiddy Jahan
6. (Pakistan) Mohammed Yasin
7. (Pakistan) Aftab Jawaid
8. (Australia) Bill Reedman

== Draw and results ==
=== First round ===
Player One	Player Two	Score
(Republic of Ireland) Jonah Barrington	(England) Bryan Patterson	9-0 9-7 9-6
(Pakistan) Gogi Alauddin	(Egypt) Sheriff Ali	9-1 9-0 9-3
(Australia) Ken Hiscoe	(England) Tony Swift	9-3 9-3 9-0
(Pakistan) Hiddy Jahan	(Scotland) Kim Bruce-Lockhart	
(Australia) Bill Reedman	(England) Paul Millman	9-3 9-10 8-10 9-5 9-0
(England) John Easter	(India) Hisamud Din	9-2 9-3 10-8
(Pakistan) Rehmatullah Khan	(Pakistan) Youssef Khan	9-7 9-3 9-5
(Egypt) Ahmed Safwat	(South Africa) Mike Nathanson	9-7 9-6 9-0
(England) Mike Grundy	(Australia) M Letch	9-0 9-0 9-0
(Pakistan) Amanullah Khan	(Egypt) Abdul Rashid	9-2 9-0 9-3
(Egypt) Abdelfattah Abou Taleb	(United States) John Hutchinson	9-3 9-7 9-1
(England) Peter Verow	(Australia) Len Atkins	9-5 8-10 10-9 9-1
(Australia) Robert Meuleman	(England) Mike de Semlyen	9-7 9-6 9-0
(Pakistan) Torsam Khan	(Egypt) Galal Allam	9-0 9-10 9-7 9-1
(England) Tony Gathercole	(England) Alan Sims	5-9 10-9 9-3 10-8

=== Second round to final ===
Second round
1	(Republic of Ireland) Jonah Barrington	9	5	9	9
(Pakistan) Amanullah Khan	6	9	4	3
(England) John Easter	10	9	7	9
(Pakistan) Torsam Khan	9	6	9	6
(Egypt) Ahmed Safwat	9	9	3	9
(Australia) Ron Meuleman	4	3	9	4
8	(Australia) Bill Reedman	9	9	8	9
(England) Peter Verow	5	4	10	1
4	(Australia) Ken Hiscoe	9	10	9
(Egypt) Abdelfattah Abou Taleb	1	9	7
(Pakistan) Rehmatullah Khan	9	9	9
(England) Tony Gathercole	1	1	2
5	(Pakistan) Hiddy Jahan	8	9	10	9
(England) Pat Kirton	10	2	8	3
(England) Mike Grundy	5	9	4	10
(South Africa) Alan Colburn	7	0	9	8
3	(Pakistan) Gogi Alauddin	9	9	9
(Pakistan) Sajjad Muneer	4	3	6
(Egypt) Aly Abdel Aziz	9	9	8	9
(England) Clive Francis	3	1	10	4
6	(Pakistan) Mohammed Yasin	6	10	9	9
(Pakistan) Mohibullah Khan	9	8	3	0
(Egypt) Khalifa Salim	w/o
(Australia) Dick Carter	scr
2	(Australia) Geoff Hunt	9	7	9	9
(Pakistan) Mohammed Saleem	7	9	1	4
(Pakistan) Sharif Khan	9	9	9
(England) John Palmer	2	1	5
7	(Pakistan) Aftab Jawaid	9	9	0	3	9
(Egypt) Mohamed Asran	7	3	9	9	3
(Pakistan) Qamar Zaman	9	9	4	9
(Egypt) Hassan Hegazi	5	3	9	5

Third round
1	(Republic of Ireland) Barrington	9	8	9	9
(England) Easter	4	10	2	1
(Egypt) Safwat	9	9	4	9
8	(Australia) Reedman	0	5	9	3
4	(Australia) Hiscoe	9	9	9
(Pakistan) Khan R	7	2	2
5	(Pakistan) Jahan	5	9	9	9
(England) Grundy	9	6	1	5
3	(Pakistan) Alauddin	9	9	9
(Egypt) Aziz	1	0	2
6	(Pakistan) Yasin	9	9	9
(Egypt) Salim	1	5	3
2	(Australia) Hunt	9	9	4	4	9
(Pakistan) Khan S	3	2	9	9	0
7	(Pakistan) Jawaid	4	9	6	9	9
(Pakistan) Zaman	9	5	9	3	4

Quarter-finals
1	(Republic of Ireland) Barrington	9	9	8	9
(Egypt) Safwat	3	4	10	0
4	(Australia) Hiscoe	2	9	9	9
5	(Pakistan) Jahan	9	5	0	7
3	(Pakistan) Alauddin	6	9	9	9
6	(Pakistan) Yasin	9	2	3	3
2	(Australia) Hunt	9	9	9
7	(Pakistan) Jawaid	6	6	3

Semi-finals
1	(Republic of Ireland) Barrington	3	9	7	9	9
4	(Australia) Hiscoe	9	1	9	1	2
Final
1	(Republic of Ireland) Barrington	9	9	9
3	(Pakistan) Alauddin	4	3	2
3	(Pakistan) Alauddin	1	9	9	10
2	(Australia) Hunt	9	7	1	8

Preceded by 1972	British Open Squash Championships; England (London); 1973	Succeeded by 1974
