= 1974 Men's British Open Squash Championship =

1917 Thing in Benson house

British Open Squash Championships
- 36th British Open Championships

Details
- Location: Sheffield, England
- Venue: Abbeydale Park

The 1974 Benson & Hedges British Open Championships was held at Abbeydale Park in Sheffield from 31 January – 8 February 1974.

The final was scratched and Geoff Hunt won his second title as Mo Yasin was unable to compete due to badly spraining his ankle during the semi-final: this was the first time the final could not be held since 1934.

As a consolation, the crowd was treated to an exhibition match between Hunt and Barrington.

== Seeds ==
1. (Republic of Ireland) Jonah Barrington
2. (Australia) Geoff Hunt
3. (Pakistan) Gogi Alauddin
4. (Australia) Ken Hiscoe
5. (Pakistan) Qamar Zaman
6. (Australia) Cam Nancarrow
7. (Pakistan) Hiddy Jahan
8. (Pakistan) Mohamed Yasin

== Draw and results ==
=== Final ===
(Australia) Geoff Hunt beat (Pakistan) Mohammed Yasin w/o

=== Section 1 ===
First round
1	(Republic of Ireland) Jonah Barrington	9	9	9
(England) Pat Kirton	1	4	6
(England) John Easter	9	9	9
(England) Mike Peasley	0	2	2
(England) Philip Ayton	9	10	9
(England) John Kingston	1	8	5
(Egypt) Abbas Kaoud	9	9	9
(Pakistan) Shah Jehan Khan	7	5	3
8	(Pakistan) Mohammed Yasin	9	9	9
(England) Barry O'Connor	1	2	3
(Egypt) H Razek	9	7	9	9
(England) Ken Davidson	6	9	3	7
(Pakistan) Sharif Khan	9	9	9
(England) Alan Sims	0	5	3
(Pakistan) Torsam Khan	9	9	9
(England) Guy Morgan	7	4	7
4	(Australia) Ken Hiscoe	10	5	9	9
(Scotland) Kim Bruce-Lockhart	8	9	6	6
(England) Bryan Patterson
(Pakistan) Sajjad Muneer
(Pakistan) Aftab Jawaid	9	9	9
(England) John Palmer	5	2	4
5	(Pakistan) Qamar Zaman
(Egypt) Galal Allam	9	0	9	10
(England) Tony Swift	6	9	2	8
(Egypt) Mohammed Asran	2	9	9	9
(England) Peter Verow	9	2	0	2
(Egypt) Ahmed Nadi	9	6	9	9
(England) Bob Johnson	3	9	3	0

Second round
1	(Republic of Ireland) Barrington	9	10	10
(England) Easter	6	9	9
(England) Ayton	9	10	6	9
(Egypt) Kaoud	5	8	9	5
8	(Pakistan) Yasin	9	9	9
(Egypt) Razek	3	0	0
(Pakistan) Khan S	9	9	9
(Pakistan) Torsam Khan	7	7	4
4	(Australia) Hiscoe	5	9	9	8	3
(England) Patterson	9	0	6	10	9
(Pakistan) Muneer	9	2	9	9
(Pakistan) Jawaid	4	9	5	6
5	(Pakistan) Zaman	9	9	9
(Egypt) Allam	0	3	5
(Egypt) Asran	9	9	9
(Egypt) Nadi	1	2	4

Third round
1	(Republic of Ireland) Barrington	0	9	9	10
(England) Ayton	9	3	5	8
8	(Pakistan) Yasin	9	3	9	9
5	(Pakistan) Khan S	2	9	1	1
(Pakistan) Muneer	6	9	9	9
(England) Patterson	5	7	0
5	(Pakistan) Zaman	9	9	9
(Egypt) Asran	3	6	6

Quarter-finals
1	(Republic of Ireland) Barrington	9	4	8	2
8	(Pakistan) Yasin	1	9	10	9
Semi-finals
8	(Pakistan) Yasin	5	9	10	9
5	(Pakistan) Zaman	9	7	9	7
(Pakistan) Muneer	6	2	2
5	(Pakistan) Zaman	9	9	9

=== Section 2 ===
First round
3	(Pakistan) Gogi Alauddin	9	9	9
(England) Paul Millman	2	3	0
(Pakistan) Rehmatullah Khan	9	10	9
(Egypt) Hassan Hegazi	4	8	0
(Egypt) Mohamed Khalifa	9	9	9
(England) Mike de Semlyen	0	0	3
(Australia) Leo Keppell	6	9	9	9
(England) Mike Grundy	9	1	4	0
6	(Australia) Cameron Nancarrow	9	9	9
(England) David d'Arcy-Hughes	2	2	1
(England) Mike Thurgur	9	9	9
(England) S W Balme	5	0	0
(Pakistan) Mohammed Saleem	10	9	7	9
(Australia) Gregory Robberds	9	7	9	2
(England) Charles Booth	9	10	5	9	9
(England) Neil Stewart	10	9	9	4	5
2	(Australia) Geoff Hunt	9	9	9
(Pakistan) Abbas Khan	0	1	3
(Pakistan) Sharif Ali	9	9	9
(England) D P Morgan	2	0	0
(Egypt) Ahmed Safwat	9	9	9
(England) Brian Wise	2	0	0
(England) Stuart Courtney	9	9	9
(Australia) Rob Jolly	7	3	6
7	(Pakistan) Hiddy Jahan	9	9	10
(Pakistan) Amanullah Khan	4	3	9
(Nigeria) Mark M'Fuk
(Pakistan) Mohibullah Khan	9	8	9	9
(Pakistan) Gulmast Khan	3	10	0	0
(England) Clive Francis	9	9	5	6	9
(Egypt) Aladin Allouba	7	7	9	9	5

Second round
3	(Pakistan) Alauddin	9	9	9
(Pakistan) Khan R	6	1	6
(Egypt) Khalifa	4	9	9	7	9
(Australia) Keppell	9	3	7	9	7
6	(Australia) Nancarrow	9	9	9
(England) Thurgur	1	5	2
(Pakistan) Saleem	9	9	4	10
(England) Booth	6	0	9	8
2	(Australia) Hunt	9	9	9
(Pakistan) Sharif Ali	0	6	2
(Egypt) Safwat	9	9	9
(England) Courtney	6	6	2
7	(Pakistan) Jahan	9	9	9
(Nigeria) Mfuk	2	7	1
(Pakistan) Khan M	9	9	9
(England) Francis	1	3	6

Third round
3	(Pakistan) Alauddin	9	9	9
(Egypt) Khalifa	1	3	4
6	(Australia) Nancarrow	4	9	9	7	9
(Pakistan) Saleem	9	2	3	9	5
2	(Australia) Hunt	9	9	9
(Egypt) Safwat	5	3	0
7	(Pakistan) Jahan	10	9	7	6	9
(Pakistan) Khan M	9	5	9	9	1

Quarter-finals
3	(Pakistan) Alauddin	9	9	9
6	(Australia) Nancarrow	7	7	2
Semi-finals
3	(Pakistan) Alauddin	4	7	3
2	(Australia) Hunt	9	9	9
2	(Australia) Hunt	9	9	9
7	(Pakistan) Jahan	4	3	6

Preceded by 1973	British Open Squash Championships; England (London); 1974	Succeeded by 1975
