= 1977 Men's British Open Squash Championship =

British Open Squash Championships
- 39th British Open Championships

Details
- Location: London, England
- Venue: Wembley Squash Centre

The 1977 Lucas Industries British Open Championships was held at Wembley Squash Centre in London, from 26 March – 4 April 1977.
Geoff Hunt won his fourth title defeating Cameron Nancarrow in the final. The Pakistan government did not allow their leading players to compete because South African players lined up in the field.

The Pakistan government banned their players from playing due to South Africa's apartheid situation and the participation of South African players. However, two players, Rehmatullah Khan and his brother Aminullah Khan held dual national passports (British and Pakistani) and duly competed.

== Seeds ==
1. (Australia) Geoff Hunt
2. (Egypt) Ahmed Safwat
3. (Australia) Cameron Nancarrow
4. (Republic of Ireland) Jonah Barrington
5. (South Africa) Roland Watson
6. (Australia) Ken Hiscoe
7. (Egypt) Aly Abdel Aziz
8. (Australia) Kevin Shawcross
9. (New Zealand) Bruce Brownlee
10. (Egypt) Mohammed Asran
11. (England) Jonathan Leslie
12. (England) John Easter
13. (Egypt) Abbas Kaoud
14. (Pakistan) Rehmatullah Khan
15. (New Zealand) Murray Lilley
16. (England) Bryan Patterson

== Draw and results ==
=== Final ===
(Australia) Geoff Hunt beat (Australia) Cameron Nancarrow 9-4 9-4 8-10 9-4

=== Section 1 ===
First round
1	(Australia) Geoff Hunt
bye
(England) Arthur Hough	9	2	6	9	10
(Egypt) Sherif Aly	6	9	9	6	9
16	(England) Bryan Patterson	9	9	9
(England) N Preston	0	7	5
(England) Barry O'Connor	9	9	9
(England) Paul Millman	4	1	4
8	(Australia) Kevin Shawcross	9	9	9
(England) David Mason	5	7	4
(Sweden) Mikael Hellstrom	6	9	9	9
(England) Terry Mabbitt	9	6	7	4
9	(New Zealand) Bruce Brownlee	9	9	9
(United States) Bill Andruss	2	2	1
(Pakistan) Amanullah Khan	9	9	9
(England) Pat Kirton	6	4	3
4	(England) (Republic of Ireland) Jonah Barrington	9	9	9
(United States) Eliot Berry	5	3	7
(Australia) Wayne Skinner	9	9	9
(England) P Tibbs	1	0	6
13	(Egypt) Abbas Kaoud	9	9	9
(England) P White	7	6	0
(England) Cliff Roe	9	9	9
(Canada) David Morgan	2	0	2
5	(South Africa) Roland Watson	9	9	9
(Australia) Dean Williams	4	5	6
(England) Ian Robinson	9	9	9
(India) I Din	3	2	1
12	(England) John Easter	9	9	9
(Nigeria) Mark M'Fuk	2	0	1
(Scotland) Kim Bruce-Lockhart	9	4	9	9
(South Africa) W Oakley	3	9	3	7

Second round
1	(Australia) Hunt	9	9	9
(England) Hough	1	0	3
16	(England) Patterson	9	9	9	7	2
(England) O'Connor	4	10	4	9	9
8	(Australia) Shawcross	9	9	9
(Sweden) Hellstrom	4	4	4
9	(New Zealand) Brownlee	9	9	6
(Pakistan) Khan A	0	7	0	ret
4	(England) (Republic of Ireland) Barrington	9	9	9
(Australia) Skinner	1	4	1
13	(Egypt) Kaoud	9	9	9
(England) Roe	6	6	4
5	(South Africa) Watson	9	2	9	10
(England) Robinson	5	9	1	9
12	(England) Easter	9	9	9
(Scotland) Bruce-Lockhart	0	5	2

Third round
1	(Australia) Hunt	9	9	9
(England) O'Connor	3	4	2
8	(Australia) Shawcross	9	9	10	7	1
9	(New Zealand) Brownlee	4	10	8	9	9
4	(Republic of Ireland) (England) Barrington	10	9	9
13	(Egypt) Kaoud	9	4	3
5	(South Africa) Watson	9	5	9	9
12	(England) Easter	2	9	4	2

Quarter-finals
1	(Australia) Hunt	9	10	5	2	7
9	(New Zealand) Brownlee	4	1	4
Semi-finals
1	(Australia) Hunt	9	9	9
4	(Republic of Ireland) (England) Barrington	5	2	0
4	(Republic of Ireland) (England) Barrington	10	9	5	9
5	(South Africa) Watson	8	1	9	6

=== Section 2 ===
First round
3	(Australia) Cam Nancarrow	9	9	10
(England) G Hodgetts	3	1	8
(England) Bryan Pearson	9	9	9
(Egypt) Galal Allam	6	0	0
14	(Pakistan) Rehmatullah Khan	9	9	9
(England) Paul Wright	4	3	1
(Egypt) Mohamed Khalifa	1	9	10	9
(England) Mike Thurgur	9	4	9	0
6	(Australia) Ken Hiscoe	9	9	9
(Jersey) Denis Pennington	1	3	7
(Sweden) Leif Leiner	4	9	9	10
(England) Mike Grundy	9	4	1	8
11	(England) Jonathan Leslie	9	4	8	9	10
(Egypt) Moussa Helal	6	9	10	7	8
(Sweden) Lars Kvant	9	9	9
(Australia) Ross Thorne	1	0	4
2	(Egypt) Ahmed Safwat	9	9	9
(England) Nigel Giffin	0	0	1
(South Africa) Alan Colburn	9	9	9
(England) Tony Swift	7	1	6
15	(New Zealand) Murray Lilley	9	9	9
(England) Clive Francis	4	5	1
(Egypt) Mohamed Awad	9	9	9
(Egypt) H Nasser	3	3	4
7	(Egypt) Aly Abdel Aziz	9	9	9
(South Africa) Bob Shay	1	2	1
(New Zealand) Craig Blackwood
10	(Egypt) Mohamed Asran	9	10	9
(Sweden) Bosse Boström	8	0	2
(Australia) Frank Donnelly	9	6	10	3	10
(Guernsey) John Le Lievre	6	9	8	9	9

Second round
3	(Australia) Nancarrow	9	9	7	9
(England) Pearson	6	6	9	2
14	(Pakistan) Khan R	9	9	9
(Egypt) Khalifa	0	1	0
6	(Australia) Hiscoe	9	9	9
(Sweden) Leiner	5	6	3
(England) Leslie	9	9	9
(Sweden) Kvant	7	0	0
2	(Egypt) Safwat	9	9	9
(South Africa) Colburn	4	1	1
15	(New Zealand) Lilley	9	9	9
(Egypt) Awad	6	6	2
7	(Egypt) Aziz
(New Zealand) Blackwood
10	(Egypt) Asran	9	9	7	9
(Australia) Donnelly	1	2	9	1

Third round
3	(Australia) Nancarrow	7	9	9	9
14	(Pakistan) Khan R	9	6	5	2
6	(Australia) Hiscoe	4	4	9	8
11	(England) Leslie	9	9	7	10
2	(Egypt) Safwat	9	9	9
15	(New Zealand) Lilley	7	7	2
7	(Egypt) Aziz	7	9	9	3
10	(Egypt) Asran	9	2	10	9

Quarter-finals
3	(Australia) Nancarrow	9	7	9	9
11	(England) Leslie	4	9	3	5
Semi-finals
3	(Australia) Nancarrow	9	9	6	9
2	(Egypt) Safwat	1	6	9	1
2	(Egypt) Safwat	9	9	9
10	(Egypt) Asran	5	2	7

Preceded by 1976	British Open Squash Championships; England (London); 1977	Succeeded by 1978
