= 1977 Men's World Open Squash Championship =

Squash event

Men's World Open 1977
- 2nd PSA World Squash Championship
- Location: Adelaide, Australia
- Date: 11–21 October 1977

PSA World Tour
- Category: World Open

Results
- Champion: (Australia) Geoff Hunt
- Runner-up: (Pakistan) Qamar Zaman
- Semi-finalists: (Pakistan) Mohibullah Khan (Pakistan) Gogi Alauddin

The 1977 PSA Men's Uniroyal World Open Squash Championship is the men's edition of the 1977 World Open, which serves as the individual world championship for squash players. The event took place at Brahma Lodge in Adelaide, Australia, from 11 October to 21 October 1977. Geoff Hunt won his second World Open title, defeating Qamar Zaman in the final.

The event was the second 'Open' event billed as the world championship. Previously the British Open had been considered the primary event in squash. The World Amateur Squash Championship continued to run in addition to the Open event until 1980.

== Seeds ==
1. (Australia) Geoff Hunt (champion)
2. (Pakistan) Mohibullah Khan (semifinals)
3. (Pakistan) Qamar Zaman (final)
4. (Pakistan) Gogi Alauddin (semifinals)
5. (Pakistan) Hiddy Jahan (quarterfinals)
6. (South Africa) Roland Watson (quarterfinals)
7. (Republic of Ireland) Jonah Barrington (quarterfinals)
8. (Australia) Cam Nancarrow (first round)

== Draw and results ==
=== First round ===
Player One	Player Two	Score
(Australia) Geoff Hunt (1)	(New Zealand) Craig Blackwood	9-5 9-4 9-0
(Pakistan) Mohibullah Khan (2)	(Australia) Malcolm Hall	9-0 9-3 9-2
(Pakistan) Qamar Zaman (3)	(Australia) Andy Saulys	9-3 9-3 9-5
(Pakistan) Gogi Alauddin (4)	(Australia) Trevor Quick	9-0 9-0 9-6
(Pakistan) Hiddy Jahan (5)	(Sweden) Leif Leiner	6-9 9-0 9-2 9-1
(Republic of Ireland) Jonah Barrington (6)	(Australia) Bob Baker	9-3 3-9 9-0 9-0
(South Africa) Roland Watson (7)	(Australia) Peter Wright	w/o
(Australia) Cam Nancarrow (8)	(Australia) Tony Hosford	9-0 9-3 9-2
(Egypt) Aly Abdel Aziz	(Australia) Des Panizza	9-6 9-0 9-2
(Australia) Robert Pratt	(Pakistan) Maqsood Ahmed	w/o
(Egypt) Ahmed Safwat	(Pakistan) Hassan Musa	9-0 9-3 9-2
(England) John Easter	(Australia) Alex Morkunas	9-0 9-2 9-0
(Australia) Kevin Shawcross	(Australia) Rodney Clift	10-8 9-6 9-4
(Pakistan) Torsam Khan	(Australia) R. Brown	9-0 9-1 9-0
(Australia) Ray Lewis	(Sweden) Tarras Tovar	9-3 9-6 9-10 10-8
(Australia) Glen Brumby	(Pakistan) Atlas Khan	w/o
(Australia) David Pinnington	(Australia) Gregory Robberds	9-5 9-0 9-1
(Pakistan) Rahmat Khan	(Australia) Craig Bowden	9-2 9-2 9-1
(Australia) Ken Hiscoe	(Australia) Fred Howell	9-5 9-3 9-4
(New Zealand) Bruce Brownlee	(Australia) Allan McCulloch	7-9 9-1 9-2 9-1
(New Zealand) Murray Lilley	(Australia) Tim D'Arcy	9-1 9-0 9-1
(Australia) Hadyn Daly	(Australia) D. Stone	9-6 6-9 9-0 9-2
(Egypt) Abbas Kaoud	(Australia) Shane Rimmington	9-6 9-0 9-3
(Australia) Kim Wilkins	(Singapore) Ibrahim Husain	w/o
(United States) Bill Andruss	(Australia) Len Atkins	9-7 9-4 9-0
(Australia) Bryce Allanson	(Australia) Geoff Dittmar	8-10 9-1 2-9 9-0 9-5
(Pakistan) Rahim Gul	(Australia) Neno Vince	10-9 2-9 9-3 9-6
(Australia) Doug Stephenson	(Australia) Roy Ollier	9-4 9-8 9-4
(Australia) Ian Stephenson	(Australia) P. Grant	9-1 9-0 9-4
(South Africa) Alan Colburn	(Australia) M. Hannah	9-3 9-4 9-0
(Australia) Steve Bowditch	(England) Dick Carter	9-6 9-3 9-0
(Egypt) Mohamed Khalifa	?	

Second round
1	(Australia) Geoff Hunt	9	9	9
(Australia) Steve Bowditch	3	4	1
(Australia) Robert Pratt	10	9	9
(Egypt) Mohamed Khalifa	8	5	3
(New Zealand) Bruce Brownlee	9	9	9	9
8	(Australia) Cam Nancarrow	3	10	2	7
(Egypt) Ahmed Safwat	9	9	9
(South Africa) Alan Colburn	6	6	6
4	(Pakistan) Gogi Alauddin	9	9	9
(Australia) Ian Stephenson	3	3	1
(England) John Easter	9	9	9
(Australia) Haydn Daly	2	0	4
5	(Pakistan) Hiddy Jahan	9	9	9
(Australia) Grantley Pinnington	7	0	5
(Australia) Kevin Shawcross	7	9	9	2	9
(Australia) Ray Lewis	9	4	3	9	0
2	(Pakistan) Mohibullah Khan	9	9	9
(Australia) Bryce Allanson	1	0	1
(Australia) Ken Hiscoe	3	2	9	9	9
(New Zealand) Murray Lilley	9	9	5	2	3
6	(South Africa) Roland Watson	9	9	9
(Australia) Kim Wilkins	3	1	1
(Pakistan) Torsam Khan	9	9	9
(Pakistan) Rahim Gul	3	1	1
3	(Pakistan) Qamar Zaman	9	9	9
(Australia) Glen Brumby	2	1	1
(Pakistan) Rahmat Khan	2	9	9	2	w/o
(Egypt) Abbas Kaoud	9	5	6	0	scr
7	(Republic of Ireland) Jonah Barrington	9	9	9
(United States) Bill Andruss	4	3	1
(Egypt) Aly Abdel Aziz	9	9	9
(Australia) Doug Stephenson	1	0	4

Third round
1	(Australia) Hunt	9	9	9
(Australia) Pratt	0	5	4
(New Zealand) Brownlee	9	9	2	9
(Egypt) Safwat	1	4	9	7
4	(Pakistan) Alauddin	9	9	6	9
(England) Easter	6	3	9	3
5	(Pakistan) Jahan	10	9	9
(Australia) Shawcross	8	4	5
2	(Pakistan) M Khan	9	9	9
(Australia) Hiscoe	1	0	3
6	(South Africa) Watson	9	9	5	9
(Pakistan) T Khan	1	2	9	4
3	(Pakistan) Zaman	9	9	9
(Pakistan) R Khan	5	3	1
7	(Republic of Ireland) Barrington	9	9	7	2	w/o
(Egypt) Aziz	2	7	9	5	disq

Quarter-finals
1	(Australia) Hunt	9	9	9
(New Zealand) Brownlee	2	7	3
4	(Pakistan) Alauddin	7	9	5	10	10
5	(Pakistan) Jahan	9	3	9	9	8
2	(Pakistan) M Khan	9	9	9
6	(South Africa) Watson	4	6	5
3	(Pakistan) Zaman	9	9	9
7	(Republic of Ireland) Barrington	1	5	5

Semi-finals
1	(Australia) Hunt	9	5	9	9
4	(Pakistan) Alauddin	6	9	2	6
Final
1	(Australia) Hunt	9	10	0	1	9
3	(Pakistan) Zaman	5	9	9	9	4
2	(Pakistan) M Khan	9	4	6	10	1
3	(Pakistan) Zaman	5	9	9	8	9

=== Third Place Play Off ===
The only time a third place play off took place in World Open history was in 1977.

Player One	Player Two	Score
(Pakistan) Mohibullah Khan	(Pakistan) Gogi Alauddin	9-4 9-3 5-9 9-3

== See also ==
- PSA World Open

Preceded by England (London); 1976	World Open; Australia (Adelaide); 1977	Succeeded by Toronto (Canada); 1979
