= 1980 Men's World Open Squash Championship =

Men's World Open 1980
- 4th PSA World Squash Championship
- Location: Adelaide, Australia
- Date: October 4–10, 1980

PSA World Tour
- Category: World Open

Results
- Champion: (Australia) Geoff Hunt
- Runner-up: (Pakistan) Qamar Zaman
- Semi-finalists: (Pakistan) Mohibullah Khan (Pakistan) Hiddy Jahan

The 1980 PSA Men's World Open Squash Championship is the men's edition of the 1980 World Open, which serves as the individual world championship for squash players. The event took place in Adelaide in Australia, from 4 October until 10 October 1980. Geoff Hunt won his fourth consecutive World Open title, defeating Qamar Zaman in the final for the third successive year.

The event was the fourth 'Open' event billed as the world championship. Previously the British Open had been considered the primary event in squash. The World Amateur Squash Championship was held in addition to the event for the last time because squash went fully open.

== Seeds ==
1. (Australia) Geoff Hunt (champion)
2. (Pakistan) Qamar Zaman (final)
3. (Pakistan) Mohibullah Khan (semifinals)
4. (Pakistan) Hiddy Jahan (semifinals)
5. (New Zealand) Bruce Brownlee (third round)
6. (Pakistan) Maqsood Ahmed (third round)
7. (Pakistan) Gogi Alauddin (quarterfinals)
8. (Egypt) Gamal Awad (quarterfinals)

== Draw and results ==
=== First round ===
Player One	Player Two	Score
(Australia) Geoff Hunt (1)	(Australia) B. Turner	9-0 9-2 9-1
(Pakistan) Qamar Zaman (2)	(Australia) David Pinnington	9-4 9-1 10-8
(Pakistan) Mohibullah Khan (3)	(Sweden) Bosse Boström	9-2 9-4 9-3
(Pakistan) Hiddy Jahan (4)	(Australia) Ricki Hill	9-2 9-0 5-9 9-1
(New Zealand) Bruce Brownlee (5)	(Australia) Terry Cheetham	9-1 7-9 9-6 9-2
(Pakistan) Maqsood Ahmed (6)	(Australia) M. Nash	9-0 9-0 9-2
(Pakistan) Gogi Alauddin (7)	(Australia) Gregory Robberds	9-0 9-3 9-6
(Egypt) Gamal Awad (8)	(Australia) Kim Wilkins	9-4 9-2 9-5
(Australia) Dean Williams	(Australia) Mark Baylis	9-3 9-0 9-2
(Pakistan) Jahangir Khan	(Australia) Richard Massey	9-1 9-1 9-1
(Australia) Glen Brumby	(Australia) Velio Pukk	9-3 9-2 10-9
(England) Phil Kenyon	(Australia) Ian Stephenson	9-6 9-0 9-1
(Australia) Cameron Nancarrow (13)	(Australia) Allan McCulloch	9-7 10-8 9-0
(Republic of Ireland) Jonah Barrington	(New Zealand) Brian Barnett	9-3 9-6 9-5
(South Africa) Roland Watson	(Australia) W. Miller	9-3 9-5 9-0
(New Zealand) Ross Norman	(Australia) Trevor Quick	9-2 9-6 9-2
(Australia) Stephen Wall	(Australia) Malcolm Hall	9-6 10-8 10-9
(Australia) Rodney George	(Australia) J. Wright	9-7 9-6 9-3
(Australia) Peter Nance	(Australia) Fred Howell	9-0 9-4 5-9 9-4
(Australia) Chris Dittmar	(Australia) Doug Stephenson	9-3 9-7 4-9 1-9 9-5
(Australia) Mark Mounsey	(New Zealand) Paul Viggers	5-9 9-0 9-6 9-0
(New Zealand) Neven Barbour	(Australia) Grantley Pinnington	9-5 9-2 9-1
(Australia) Roger Flynn	(Australia) Shane Rimmington	9-0 7-9 9-2 9-5
(New Zealand) Craig Blackwood	(Australia) Rod Hozack	10-8 9-1 10-8
(Australia) Greg Pollard	(Australia) Simon Gogolin	9-1 9-3 9-1
(Australia) Ian Yeates	(Australia) Paul McDonald	9-5 9-0 9-6
(Australia) Kevin Shawcross	(Australia) Chris Carter	9-3 3-9 9-5 9-5
(Australia) Ross Thorne	(Australia) C. Jensen	9-2 8-10 9-2 9-5
(Australia) Steve Bowditch	(Australia) P. Grant	9-3 9-1 9-3
(Australia) Bryce Allanson	(Australia) Bob Baker	9-1 9-2 9-3
(Australia) Roy Ollier	(Australia) Geoff Dittmar	9-3 9-4 9-0
(Australia) Frank Donnelly	(Australia) Len Atkins	9-1 10-8 10-9

=== Main draw ===
Second round
1	(Australia) Geoff Hunt	9	9	9
(Australia) Stephen Wall	6	4	1
(New Zealand) Ross Norman	9	9	9
(Australia) Frank Donnelly	5	6	1
7	(Pakistan) Gogi Alauddin	10	9	10
(Australia) Mark Mounsey	8	2	8
(South Africa) Roland Watson	9	9	9
(Australia) Roy Ollier	0	3	5
4	(Pakistan) Hiddy Jahan	9	9	9
(Australia) Chris Dittmar	5	3	7
(England) Phil Kenyon	9	10	9
(Australia) Ross Thorne	5	8	4
8	(Egypt) Gamal Awad	5	9	9	9
(Australia) Roger Flynn	9	2	2	4
(Republic of Ireland) Jonah Barrington	9	9	9
(Australia) Bryce Allanson	0	6	3
2	(Pakistan) Qamar Zaman	9	9	9
(Australia) Rodney George	4	0	2
(Australia) Glen Brumby	9	9	9
(Australia) Kevin Shawcross	0	5	7
(Pakistan) Jahangir Khan	9	9	3	9
(Australia) Ian Yeates	1	4	9	3
6	(Pakistan) Maqsood Ahmed	9	9	9
(New Zealand) Neven Barbour	3	0	0
3	(Pakistan) Mohibullah Khan	9	7	9	9
(Australia) Peter Nance	6	9	0	2
(Australia) Steve Bowditch	9	9	10
13	(Australia) Cameron Nancarrow	3	7	8
(Australia) Dean Williams	9	9	9
(New Zealand) Craig Blackwood	5	6	2
5	(New Zealand) Bruce Brownlee	9	9	7	9
(Australia) Greg Pollard	5	4	9	5

Third round
1	(Australia) Hunt	9	9	9
(New Zealand) Norman	7	2	0
7	(Pakistan) Alauddin	9	10	9
(South Africa) Watson	6	8	7
4	(Pakistan) Jahan	9	10	9
(England) Kenyon	3	9	3
8	(Egypt) Awad	9	8	9	10
(Republic of Ireland) Barrington	7	10	2	9
2	(Pakistan) Zaman	9	9	6	9
(Australia) Brumby	1	3	9	5
(Pakistan) J Khan	9	9	8	9
6	(Pakistan) Ahmed	4	3	10	3
3	(Pakistan) M Khan	9	9	9
(Australia) Bowditch	5	1	6
(Australia) Williams	2	9	9	9
5	(New Zealand) Brownlee	9	5	2	0

Quarter-finals
1	(Australia) Hunt	9	10	9
7	(Pakistan) Alauddin	5	8	0
4	(Pakistan) Jahan	10	9	9
8	(Egypt) Awad	9	1	1
2	(Pakistan) Zaman	5	9	9	7	9
(Pakistan) J Khan	9	4	0	9	2
3	(Pakistan) M Khan	9	9	9
(Australia) Williams	5	5	1

Semi-finals
1	(Australia) Hunt	7	10	9	9
4	(Pakistan) Jahan	9	9	3	5
Final
1	(Australia) Hunt	9	9	9
2	(Pakistan) Zaman	0	3	3
2	(Pakistan) Zaman	10	9	9
3	(Pakistan) M Khan	8	3	3

== See also ==
- PSA World Open

Preceded by Canada (Toronto); 1979	World Open; Australia (Adelaide); 1980	Succeeded by Toronto (Canada); 1981
