= List of PSA men's number 1 ranked players =

This article is a list of PSA men's number 1 ranked players in the Men's Squash World Rankings.

The Men's Squash World Rankings are the Professional Squash Association's merit-based method for determining the world rankings in men's squash. The top-ranked player is the player who, over the previous 12 months, has garnered the most PSA ranking points. Points are awarded based on how far a player advances in tournaments and the category of those tournaments. The PSA has used a computerized system for determining the rankings since January 1975.

An updated rankings list is released each Monday.

== Number 1 ranked PSA players ==
The statistics are updated only when the PSA website revises its rankings (Monday of every week). In August 2022, PSA changed the world rankings from monthly to weekly.

Key
*	Current number 1 player
^{↑}	PSA Men's Ranking record

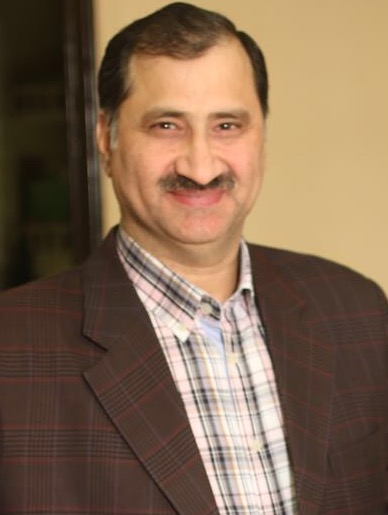
Jansher Khan has spent a 97 total months at the top of the PSA rankings, the most of any player.

No.	Country	Name	Start date	End date	Months	Accumulated total (months)	Days	Accumulated total (days)
1	PAK	Qamar Zaman	January 1975	January 1976	13	13	396	396
2	AUS	Geoff Hunt	February 1976	December 1980	59	59	1796	1796
	PAK	Qamar Zaman (2)	January 1981	December 1981	12	25	365	761
3	PAK	Jahangir Khan	January 1982	December 1987	72 ^{↑}	72	2191 ^{↑}	2191
4	PAK	Jansher Khan	January 1988	October 1988	10	10	305	305
	PAK	Jahangir Khan (2)	November 1988	October 1989	12	84	365	2556
	PAK	Jansher Khan (2)	November 1989	February 1990	4	14	120	425
	PAK	Jahangir Khan (3)	March 1990	April 1990	2	86	61	2617
	PAK	Jansher Khan (3)	May 1990	June 1990	2	16	61	486
	PAK	Jahangir Khan (4)	July 1990	October 1990	4	90	123	2740
	PAK	Jansher Khan (4)	November 1990	December 1991	14	30	426	912
	PAK	Jahangir Khan (5)	January 1992	April 1992	4	94	121	2861
	PAK	Jansher Khan (5)	May 1992	June 1993	14	44	426	1338
5	AUS	Chris Dittmar	July 1993	August 1993	2	2	62	62
	PAK	Jansher Khan (7)	September 1993	January 1998	53	97 ^{↑}	1614	2952 ^{↑}
6	SCO	Peter Nicol	February 1998	April 1999	15	15	454	454
7	CAN	Jonathon Power	May 1999	September 1999	5	5	153	153
	SCO	Peter Nicol (2)	October 1999	October 1999	1	16	31	485
	CAN	Jonathon Power (2)	November 1999	January 2000	3	8	92	245
	SCO	Peter Nicol (3)	February 2000	March 2001	14	30	426	911
	CAN	Jonathon Power (3)	April 2001	July 2001	4	12	122	367
	ENG	Peter Nicol (4)	August 2001	August 2001	1	31	31	942
8	AUS	David Palmer	September 2001	December 2001	4	4	122	122
	ENG	Peter Nicol (5)	January 2002	December 2003	24	55	730	1672
9	FRA	Thierry Lincou	January 2004	February 2004	2	2	60	60
10	SCO	John White	March 2004	April 2004	2	2	61	61
	ENG	Peter Nicol (6)	May 2004	September 2004	5	60	153	1825
11	ENG	Lee Beachill	October 2004	December 2004	3	3	92	92
	FRA	Thierry Lincou (2)	January 2005	December 2005	12	14	365	425
	CAN	Jonathon Power (4)	January 2006	January 2006	1	13	31	398
	AUS	David Palmer (2)	February 2006	February 2006	1	5	28	150
	CAN	Jonathon Power (5)	March 2006	March 2006	1	14	31	429
12	EGY	Amr Shabana	April 2006	December 2008	33	33	1006	1006
13	EGY	Karim Darwish	January 2009	October 2009	10	10	304	304
14	FRA	Grégory Gaultier	November 2009	November 2009	1	1	30	30
	EGY	Karim Darwish (2)	December 2009	December 2009	1	11	31	335
15	EGY	Ramy Ashour	January 2010	May 2010	5	5	151	151
16	ENG	Nick Matthew	June 2010	August 2010	3	3	92	92
	EGY	Ramy Ashour (2)	September 2010	December 2010	4	9	122	273
	ENG	Nick Matthew (2)	January 2011	January 2012	12	15	365	457
17	ENG	James Willstrop	January 2012	January 2012	1	1	31	31
	ENG	Nick Matthew (3)	February 2012	February 2012	1	16	29	486
	ENG	James Willstrop (2)	March 2012	December 2012	10	11	306	337
	EGY	Ramy Ashour (3)	January 2013	December 2013	12	21	365	638
	ENG	Nick Matthew (4)	January 2014	January 2014	1	17	31	517
	ENG; FRA	Nick Matthew (=); Grégory Gaultier (2)	February 2014	February 2014	1	18; 2	28	545; 58
	ENG	Nick Matthew (=)	March 2014	March 2014	1	19	31	576
	FRA	Grégory Gaultier (3)	April 2014	October 2014	7	9	214	272
18	EGY	Mohamed El Shorbagy	November 2014	November 2015	13	13	395	395
	FRA	Grégory Gaultier (4)	December 2015	December 2015	1	10	31	303
	EGY	Mohamed El Shorbagy (2)	January 2016	March 2017	15	28	456	851
	FRA	Grégory Gaultier (5)	April 2017	April 2017	1	11	30	333
19	EGY	Karim Abdel Gawad	May 2017	May 2017	1	1	31	31
	FRA	Grégory Gaultier (6)	June 2017	February 2018	9	20	273	606
	EGY	Mohamed El Shorbagy (3)	March 2018	February 2019	12	40	365	1216
20	EGY	Ali Farag	March 2019	January 2020	11	11	337	337
	EGY	Mohamed El Shorbagy (4)	February 2020	October 2020	9	49	274	1490
	EGY	Ali Farag (2)	November 2020	July 2021	9	20	273	610
	EGY	Mohamed El Shorbagy (5)	August 2021	August 2021	1	50	31	1521
	EGY	Ali Farag (3)	September 2021	February 2022	6	26	181	791
21	NZL	Paul Coll	March 2022	May 2022	3	3	92	92
	EGY	Ali Farag (4)	June 2022	Aug 28, 2022	3	29	89	880

No.	Country	Name	Start date	End date	Weeks	Accumulated total	Days	Accumulated total (days)
	EGY	Ali Farag	Aug 29, 2022	Oct 2, 2022	5	5	35	915
	NZL	Paul Coll (2)	Oct 3, 2022	Oct 16, 2022	2	2	14	106
	EGY	Ali Farag (5)	Oct 17, 2022	Jan 15, 2023	13	18	91	1006
22	EGY	Mostafa Asal	Jan 16, 2023	Apr 16, 2023	13	13	91	91
23	PER	Diego Elías	Apr 17, 2023	Jun 4, 2023	7	7	49	49
	EGY	Ali Farag (6)	Jun 5, 2023	Mar 30, 2025	95	113	665	1671
	EGY	Mostafa Asal (2)	Mar 31, 2025	Present (Oct 18, 2026)	81	94	567	658

== Days at number 1 ==
Key
Current number 1 player
Current Streak

Rank	Player	Total (months)	Total (weeks)	Total (days)
1.	(Pakistan) Jansher Khan	97		2952
2.	(Pakistan) Jahangir Khan	94		2861
3.	(Scotland) / (England) Peter Nicol	60		1825
4.	(Australia) Geoff Hunt	59		1796
5.	(Egypt) Ali Farag	29	113	1671
6.	(Egypt) Mohamed El Shorbagy	50		1521
7.	(Egypt) Amr Shabana	33		1006
8.	(Pakistan) Qamar Zaman	25		761
9.	(Egypt) Mostafa Asal		94	658
10.	(Egypt) Ramy Ashour	21		638
11.	(France) Grégory Gaultier	20		606
12.	(England) Nick Matthew	19		576
13.	(Canada) Jonathon Power	14		429
14.	(France) Thierry Lincou	14		425
15.	(England) James Willstrop	11		337
16.	(Egypt) Karim Darwish	11		335
17.	(Australia) David Palmer	5		150
18.	(New Zealand) Paul Coll	3	2	106
19.	(England) Lee Beachill	3		92
20.	(Australia) Chris Dittmar	2		62
21.	(Scotland) John White	2		61
22.	(Peru) Diego Elías		7	49
23.	(Egypt) Karim Abdel Gawad	1		31

Rank	Player	Consecutive days
1.	(Pakistan) Jahangir Khan	2191 (72 months)
2.	(Australia) Geoff Hunt	1796 (59 months)
3.	(Pakistan) Jansher Khan	1614 (53 months)
4.	(Egypt) Amr Shabana	1006 (33 months)
5.	(England) Peter Nicol	730 (24 months)
6.	(Egypt) Ali Farag	665 (95 weeks)
7.	(Egypt) Mostafa Asal	567 (81 weeks)
8.	(Egypt) Mohamed El Shorbagy	456 (15 months)
9.	(Pakistan) Qamar Zaman	396 (13 months)
10.	(Egypt) Ramy Ashour	365 (12 months)
=	(England) Nick Matthew	365 (12 months)
=	(France) Thierry Lincou	365 (12 months)
13.	(England) James Willstrop	306 (10 months)
14.	(Egypt) Karim Darwish	304 (10 months)
15.	(France) Grégory Gaultier	214 (9 months)
16.	(Canada) Jonathon Power	153 (5 months)
17.	(Australia) David Palmer	122 (4 months)
18.	(England) Lee Beachill	92 (3 months)
=	(New Zealand) Paul Coll	92 (3 months)
20.	(Australia) Chris Dittmar	62 (2 months)
21.	(Scotland) John White	61 (2 months)
22.	(Peru) Diego Elías	49 (7 weeks)
23.	(Egypt) Karim Abdel Gawad	31 (1 month)

As of October 18, 2026

== Days at No. 1 by country ==
	Country	No. of players	No. of months	No. of weeks	No. of days	Players
1.	Pakistan	3	216		6574	Jansher Khan, Jahangir Khan, Qamar Zaman
2.	Egypt	7	144	206	5865	Mohamed El Shorbagy, Amr Shabana, Ramy Ashour, Karim Darwish, Ali Farag, Karim Abdel Gawad, Mostafa Asal
3.	Australia	3	66		2008	Geoff Hunt, David Palmer, Chris Dittmar
4.	England	4	63		1919	Peter Nicol, Nick Matthew, James Willstrop, Lee Beachill
5.	France	2	34		1031	Grégory Gaultier, Thierry Lincou
6.	Scotland	2	32		972	Peter Nicol, John White
7.	Canada	1	14		429	Jonathon Power
8.	New Zealand	1	3	2	106	Paul Coll
9.	Peru	1		7	49	Diego Elías

As of October 18, 2026

== Players who were ranked World No. 1 without having won a World Championship ==
Player	Date of first No. 1 position	Num. of days No. 1	First World Championship final	Number of finals
(Pakistan) Qamar Zaman *	1st of January 1975	761 (25 months)	1977 (vs. (Australia) Geoff Hunt)	4
(Australia) Chris Dittmar	1st of July 1993	62 (2 months)	1983 (vs. (Pakistan) Jahangir Khan)	5
(Scotland) John White	1st of March 2004	61 (2 months)	2002 (vs. (Australia) David Palmer)	1
(England) Lee Beachill	1st of October 2004	92 (3 months)	2004 (vs. (France) Thierry Lincou)	1
(Egypt) Karim Darwish	1st of January 2009	335 (11 months)	2008 (vs. (Egypt) Ramy Ashour)	1
(England) James Willstrop	1st of January 2012	337 (11 months)	2010 (vs. (England) Nick Matthew)	1
(New Zealand) Paul Coll	1st of March 2022	106 (3 months & 2 weeks)	2019-20 (vs. (Egypt) Tarek Momen)	1

As of October 18, 2026

Note:

- Qamar Zaman won the British Open in 1975 (considered as the World Open on that year before its inception in 1976).

== See also ==
- PSA Awards
- Men's Squash World Rankings
- Professional Squash Association
- List of PSA women's number 1 ranked players
- Women's Squash World Rankings
