= 1975 European Squash Team Championships =

Squash tournament

- 3rd
- Location: (Republic of Ireland) Dublin
- Venue: Fitzwilliam Club
- Date: 10 – 13 April 1975
- Website europeansquash.com

Results
- Champions: Men England

The 1975 European Squash Team Championships, sponsored by Pilkington Glass, was the 3rd edition of European Squash Team Championships for squash players. The event was held at the Fitzwilliam Club in Dublin, Ireland, from 10 to 13 April 1975. The tournament was organised by the European Squash Rackets Federation (ESRF).

The England men's team won their 3rd title.

Sweden took third place.

== Men's tournament ==
=== Group stage ===
Pool A

Pos	Team	P	W	L	Pts
1	England	5	5	0	10
2	Sweden	5	4	1	8
3	Wales	5	3	2	6
4	Belgium	5	2	3	4
5	Netherlands	5	1	4	2
6	France	5	0	5	0

Pool B

Pos	Team	P	W	L	Pts
1	Scotland	5	5	0	10
2	(Republic of Ireland) Ireland	5	4	1	8
3	Finland	5	3	2	6
4	Denmark	5	2	3	4
5	Switzerland	5	1	4	2
6	Germany	5	0	5	0

=== Third place ===
Sweden
3
Third place

Ireland
2

			1	2	3	4	5
1	(Sweden) (Republic of Ireland)	Tarras Tovar; Bob Weir	9; 1	7; 9	1; 9	6; 9
2	(Sweden) (Republic of Ireland)	Fredrik Afekenstam; Ben Cranwell	6; 9	9; 6	10; 8	4; 9	6; 9
3	(Sweden) (Republic of Ireland)	Lars Kvant; Gerry Doherty	9; 10	9; 3	9; 5	6; 9	9; 2
4	(Sweden) (Republic of Ireland)	Leif Leiner; Bernard O'Gorman	9; 7	9; 7	9; 7
5	(Sweden) (Republic of Ireland)	Mikael Hellström; John Magrath	9; 6	4; 9	9; 5	9; 5

=== Final ===
England
5
Final

Scotland
0

			1	2	3	4	5
1	(England) (Scotland)	Mike Corby; Kim Bruce-Lockhart	9; 3	10; 9	10; 9
2	(England) (Scotland)	John Richardson; Neal Martin	9; 4	1; 9	9; 1	9; 5
3	(England) (Scotland)	Jonathan Leslie; Chris Wilson	9; 6	9; 1	9; 6
4	(England) (Scotland)	Ian Robinson; Robin Chalmers	9; 4	9; 2	9; 0
5	(England) (Scotland)	Patrick Kirton; Neil Stewart	4; 9	9; 3	9; 4	9; 5
