= 1977 European Squash Team Championships =

Squash tournament

- 5th
- Location: (England) Sheffield
- Venue: Abbeydale Park
- Date: 20 – 23 April 1977
- Website europeansquash.com

Results
- Champions: Men England

The 1977 European Squash Team Championships was the 5th edition of European Squash Team Championships for squash players. The event sponsored by Dunlop and Denco Holdings, was held at the Abbeydale Park in Sheffield, England, from 20 to 23 April 1977. The tournament was organised by the European Squash Rackets Federation (ESRF).

The England men's team won their 5th title.

== Men's tournament ==
=== Group stage ===
Pool A

Pos	Team	P	W	L	Pts
1	England	4	4	0	8
2	Finland	4	3	1	6
3	Netherlands	4	2	2	4
4	Denmark	4	1	3	2
5	France	4	0	4	0

Pool B

Pos	Team	P	W	L	Pts
1	Scotland	3	3	0	6
2	Wales	3	2	1	4
3	Switzerland	3	1	2	2
4	Greece	3	0	3	0

Pool C

Pos	Team	P	W	L	Pts
1	Sweden	3	3	0	6
2	(Republic of Ireland) Ireland	3	2	1	4
3	Belgium	3	1	2	2
4	Germany	3	0	3	0

=== Final Pool ===
England
5

Scotland
0

			1	2	3	4	5
1	(England) (Scotland)	Jonathan Leslie; Kim Bruce-Lockhart	9; 4	9; 5	9; 7
2	(England) (Scotland)	Ian Robinson; Robin Chalmers	9; 3	9; 2	8; 9	9; 4
3	(England) (Scotland)	Philip Ayton; Neil Stewart	9; 4	9; 3	4; 9	9; 7
4	(England) (Scotland)	Barry O'Connor; Chris Wilson	9; 4	10; 8	8; 10	9; 4
5	(England) (Scotland)	David Pearson; John McGhee	9 9; 0	9; 1			2

Sweden
3

Scotland
2

			1	2	3	4	5
1	(Sweden) (Scotland)	Mikael Hellström; Neil Stewart
2	(Sweden) (Scotland)	Bo Boström; Chris Wilson
3	(Sweden) (Scotland)	Johan Stockenberg; John Done
4	(Sweden) (Scotland)	Leif Leiner; John McGhee
5	(Sweden) (Scotland)	Fredrik Af Ekenstam; Peter Wilson

England
5

Sweden
0

			1	2	3	4	5
1	(England) (Sweden)	Jonathan Leslie; Lars Kvant	7; 9	9; 2	9; 3	9; 1
2	(England) (Sweden)	Ian Robinson; Mikael Hellström	8; 10	9; 6	9; 5	4; 9	9; 2
3	(England) (Sweden)	Philip Ayton; Bo Boström	9; 6	9; 1	9; 0
4	(England) (Sweden)	Barry O'Connor; Johan Stockenberg	9; 1	9; 6	9; 6
5	(England) (Sweden)	David Pearson; Leif Leiner	9; 3	9; 1	9; 5
