= Steve Bowditch =

Australian squash player (born 1955)

Personal information
- Nationality: Australian
- Born: 9 August 1955 (age 70) Darwin, Australia

Sport
- Highest ranking: 14 (March 1983)
Medal record
ISRF World Championship
Gold medal – first place	1981 Sweden	Singles
World Team Championships
Bronze medal – third place	1976 England	Team
Silver medal – second place	1981 Sweden	Team

Steven Mangirri Bowditch (born 9 August 1955) is a former leading professional squash player from Australia who excelled in both soft and hardball versions of the game. He was the 1981 ISRF world champion.

== Biography ==
Bowditch started playing squash in 1966 and turned professional in 1977, competing at the 1977 Men's World Open Squash Championship where he lost to Geoff Hunt in the second round. In 1978, he was named fourth member of an Australian team led by Geoff Hunt. He was eliminated in the 3rd round of both the 1979 and 1980 PSA World Championships, losing to semifinalist Mohibullah Khan in 1980.

Bowditch captained the Australian team at the 1981 World Team Squash Championships in Sweden (an amateur event but open to professionals) which lost to Pakistan in the final. He took the ISRF World Individual Championship title, also an amateur event open to professional players, held in Sweden at the same time.

Bowditch made the 3rd round at both 1982 and 1983 World Opens, taking finalist Dean Williams to four sets in the former and losing to semi-finalist Gamal Awad the next year.

In 1985, Bowditch finished runner-up to Jahangir Khan in the then richest tournament on the professional tour, the Drakkar North American Squash Open, taking home US$8,300. The same year, he lost by one point in the fifth set to Ned Edwards in the final of the Boston Open. Before the year was out, he was runner-up to England No. 1 Phil Kenyon in the inaugural Hong Kong Open.

Bowditch achieved his highest world ranking, 16, in 1986 and ranked No. 2 on the American hardball tour that same year.

In retirement, Bowditch served on the World Squash Council and as coach to the Malaysian national squash team. He is an Arabana indigenous Australian.

== Recognition ==
Bowditch was inducted into the Aboriginal and Islander Sports Hall of Fame in its inaugural list in 1994, the Northern Territory Government's Hall of Champions in 2006 and Squash Australia's Hall of Fame in 2015.
