= John Richardson (squash player) =

English squash player (born 1949)

Personal information
- Born: 1949 (age 76–77) England

Sport
- Country: England
Medal record
Men's squash
Representing England
European Team Championships
Gold medal – first place	1975 Dublin	Team

John L. Richardson (born 1949) is an English former squash player. He was a European team champion.

== Biography ==
Richardson was educated at Hurstpierpoint College and won the 1967 British U16 junior open.

He played for Middlesex at county level and won the 1969 Drysdale Cup (the national junior title and described as the Junior Wimbledon Championships of squash).

In 1970 he was selected by the SRA for Dutch Championships. He played for Ealing SC and became the youngest recorded winner of the Surrey Open in February 1971.

Richardson made his debut for Great Britain after being selected for the fixture against Pakistan on 28 January 1975 at Wembley.

He was defeated by Jonathan Leslie in the final of the 1976 British National Squash Championships and was subsequently selected for England and won the gold medal for the England men's national squash team at the European Squash Team Championships in 1975 in Dublin.

He went on to manage a South Kensington squash centre and represented Great Britain men's national squash team at the 1977 Men's World Team Squash Championships.
