= Jonathan Leslie =

English squash player

Personal information
- Born: December 1950 (age 75) Kasulu, Tanzania

Sport
- Country: British (English)
- Handedness: Right-handed
Medal record
Men's squash
Representing Great Britain
World Team Championships
Gold medal – first place	1976 Birmingham	Team
Gold medal – first place	1979 Brisbane	Team
Representing England
European Team Championships
Gold medal – first place	1975 Dublin	Team
Gold medal – first place	1976 Brussels	Team
Gold medal – first place	1977 Sheffield	Team
Gold medal – first place	1978 Amsterdam	Team
British Amateur Championships
Gold medal – first place	1979/1980	singles

Jonathan Charles Alexander Leslie (born December 1950) is a Tanzanian born, former international squash player from England and former CEO of Nikanor plc.

== Biography ==
Leslie was born in Kasulu, Tanzania, was educated at Rugby School and studied at Trinity College, Oxford in the University of Oxford. He represented the Oxford University squash team for the 1971 and 1972 varsity matches.

He was a member of the West Wycombe Squash Club and represented Buckinghamshire at county level and was the county champion in 1972 and 1973.

Leslie was the inaugural winner of the British Closed Championships in 1974 and would win it again in 1976.

His finest success came at the 1976 Men's World Team Squash Championships, when he helped Great Britain become world champions with Stuart Courtney, Philip Ayton and Ian Robinson. He would record a second World title success at the 1979 Men's World Team Squash Championships and would also win the British Amateur Squash Championships during the 1979/80 season, defeating Ross Norman in the final.

Leslie also won four gold medals for the England men's national squash team at the European Squash Team Championships in 1975, 1976, 1977 and 1978. He reached the number 1 ranking in the United Kingdom in December 1976.

Leslie was a barrister by trade and was called to the bar in 1974.

After retiring from playing he continued working as a barrister before becoming Chief Executive Officer of Nikanor Plc and branches of the Rio Tinto (corporation).
