= Geoff Hunt =

Australian squash player

Geoff Hunt AM MBE
Personal information
- Nationality: Australian
- Born: 11 March 1947 (age 79) Melbourne, Australia

Sport
- Handedness: Right Handed

Men's Singles
- Highest ranking: 1 (February 1976)
- World Open: W (1976, 1977, 1979, 1980)
Medal record
Men's squash
Representing Australia
World Championships
Gold medal – first place	1976 London	Singles
Gold medal – first place	1977 Adelaide	Singles
Gold medal – first place	1979 Toronto	Singles
Gold medal – first place	1980 Adelaide	Singles
Silver medal – second place	1981 Toronto	Singles
World Team Championships
Gold medal – first place	1967 Sydney	Team
Gold medal – first place	1969 Midlands	Team
Gold medal – first place	1971 Auckland	Team
World Amateur Championship
Gold medal – first place	1967 Melbourne	Singles
Gold medal – first place	1969 London	Singles
Gold medal – first place	1971 Hamilton	Singles

Geoffrey Brian Hunt, AM MBE (born 11 March 1947), is a retired squash player from Australia who is widely considered to be one of the greatest squash players in history. He was four-times world champion, three-times world amateur champion and eight-times British Open champion.

== Career Overview ==
Hunt was born in Melbourne and now resides in Queensland. He won the Australian Junior Championship in 1963, and he first won the Australian Amateur men's Championship in 1965.

Hunt turned professional shortly after winning his third World Amateur Squash Championship final in 1971.

He was ranked the World No.1 squash player from 1975 to 1980. He won the World Open title four times. He was the event's inaugural champion, winning the competition on the first four occasions it was held (1976, 1977, 1979 and 1980). He also won the British Open (which was considered to be the effective world championship event involving both amateurs and professionals before the World Open began) eight times between 1969 and 1981. Hunt won 178 of the 215 tournaments he contested during his career.

In 1974, he was a leading participant in the formation of the International Squash Players Association which was formed to give players a voice in an era dominated by the Squash Rackets Association. He was elected vice-president alongside Jonah Barrington (chairman), Ken Hiscoe (president) and Geoff Poole (secretary).

Hunt was known for having great determination. He ultimately suffered back problems, which curtailed his career. After retiring as a player, Hunt served as the Head Squash Coach at the Australian Institute of Sport from 1985–2003, where he helped develop a new generation of Australian squash stars. He then worked for 8 years at the Aspire Academy in Doha, Qatar. Following his retirement and move back to Australia, he has continued to coach Qatari professional player Abdulla Mohd Al Tamimi.

== Recognition ==
In the 1972 New Years Honours Hunt was made a Member of the Order of the British Empire (MBE) for services to sport and international relations. He became a Member of the Order of Australia (AM) in the 1982 Australia Day Honours and received the Australian Sports Medal in 2000.

Hunt has been inducted into the World Squash Federation Hall of Fame and the Sport Australia Hall of Fame.

== World Open final appearances ==
Wins (4)
Year	Opponent in final	Score in final
1976	Mohibullah Khan	7–9, 9–4, 8–10, 9–2, 9–2
1977	Qamar Zaman	9–5, 10–9, 0–9, 9–4
1979	Qamar Zaman	9–2, 9–3, 9–2
1980	Qamar Zaman	9–0, 9–3, 9–3
Runners-up (1)
Year	Opponent in final	Score in final
1981	Jahangir Khan	7–9, 9–1, 9–2, 9–2

== British Open final appearances ==
Wins (8)
Year	Opponent in final	Score in final
1969	Cam Nancarrow	9–5, 9–4, 9–0
1974	Mo Yasin	walkover (injury)
1976	Mohibullah Khan	7–9, 9–4, 8–10, 9–2, 9–2
1977	Cam Nancarrow	9–4, 9–4, 8–10, 9–4
1978	Qamar Zaman	7–9, 9–1, 9–1, 9–2
1979	Qamar Zaman	2–9, 9–7, 9–0, 6–9, 9–3
1980	Qamar Zaman	9–3, 9–2, 1–9, 9–1
1981	Jahangir Khan	9–2, 9–7, 5–9, 9–7
Runners-up (2)
Year	Opponent in final	Score in final
1970	Jonah Barrington	9–7, 3–9, 9–4, 9–4
1972	Jonah Barrington	0–9, 9–7, 10–8, 6–9, 9–7

== Books ==
Geoff Hunt on Squash (London: Cassell) 1977.

Sporting positions
Preceded by Qamar Zaman	World No. 1 February 1976 – December 1980	Succeeded by Qamar Zaman
