= Barry O'Connor =

English squash player (born 1954)

Personal information
- Born: 31 January 1954 (age 72) London, England

Sport
- Country: England
Medal record
Men's squash
Representing England
European Team Championships
Gold medal – first place	1977 Sheffield	Team
Gold medal – first place	1980 Helsinki	Team

Barry K. O'Connor (born 31 January 1954) is an English former squash player. He was a two time European team champion.

== Biography ==
O'Connor was born in Lambeth, London and educated at Peckham Manor School and Keele University.

As a 16-year-old junior he won the Evans Squash Cup, won the Drysdale Cup (the national junior title and described as the Junior Wimbledon Championships of squash) and became the youngest ever winner of the East Sussex Open (the latter in 1974).

He played for Surrey and then Kent at county level. In March 1976 he walked out of West of England championships before finishing his match, which led to the SRA considering suspension.

In 1976 he was a sports centre assistant and set a world record for the longest match in the British Amateur Championships; the match against New Zealander Murray Lilley at Wembley lasted two hours 35 minutes.

O'Connor made his debut for England in January 1977 and represented Great Britain men's national squash team at the 1977 Men's World Team Squash Championships.

He went on to win two gold medals for the England men's national squash team at the European Squash Team Championships in 1977 and 1980.
