= John Le Lievre =

English squash player (1956–2021)

Personal information
- Born: 9 June 1956 Saint Peter Port, Guernsey, Channel Islands
- Died: 23 May 2021 (aged 64)

Sport
- Country: Guernsey

Men's singles
- Highest ranking: No. 24 (April 1980)
Medal record
Men's squash
Representing England
European Team Championships
Gold medal – first place	1978 Amsterdam	Team
Gold medal – first place	1982 Cardiff	Team

John Robert Le Lievre (9 June 1956 – 23 May 2021) was an English professional squash player.

== Biography ==
Le Lievre was born in Saint Peter Port, Guernsey on 9 June 1956 and was an English international, winning 16 caps between 1977 and 1982. He represented England during the 1981 World Team Squash Championships. In 1983, he was elected Chairman of the International Squash Players' Association.

Le Lievre won two gold medals for the England men's national squash team at the 1978 European Squash Team Championships in Amsterdam and the 1982 European Squash Team Championships in Cardiff, the latter when he was required to play from the reserve position.
