= Bryan Patterson (squash player) =

English squash player (born 1947)

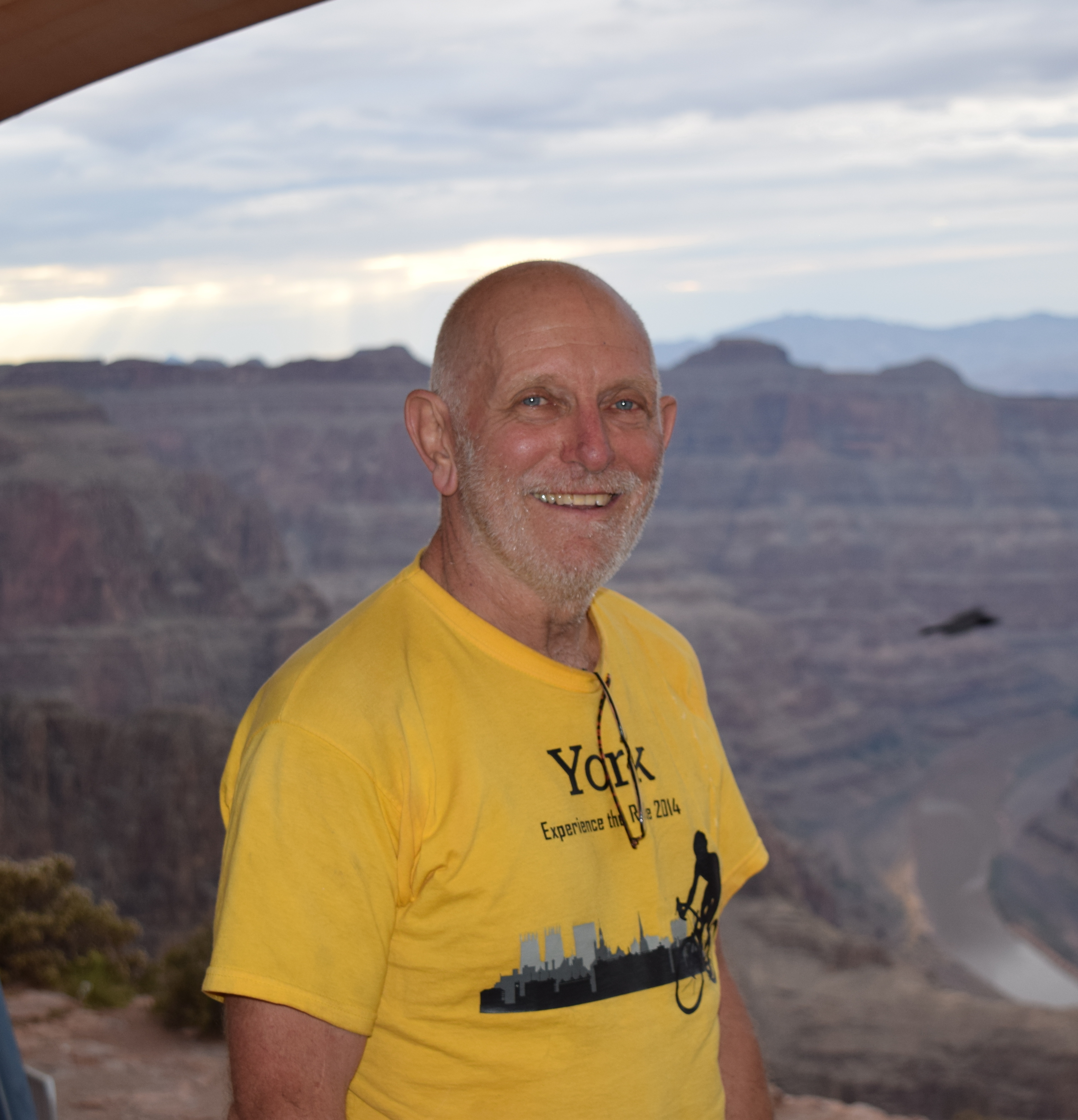
- Patterson in 2015

Personal information
- Nationality: British (English)
- Born: 1947 County Durham, England

Sport

Men's singles
- Highest ranking: No. 19 (September 1976)
Medal record
Men's squash
Representing England
World Amateur Championship
Silver medal – second place	1973 South Africa	Singles
European Team Championships
Gold medal – first place	1973 Edinburgh	Team

Bryan Patterson (born 1947) is a former professional squash player from England.

== Career ==
Patterson was born in County Durham and educated at Barnard Castle School.

In 1973 Patterson reached the final of the World Amateur Squash Championship in South Africa, where he lost to Australian Cam Nancarrow. He reached number 19 in world rankings in September 1976 and number 2 in the United Kingdom.

Patterson won a gold medal for the England men's national squash team at the European Squash Team Championships in 1973.

In addition to playing a pioneering role in domestic and international circuits, he has given much of his time to charitable and educational endeavours. Bryan Patterson is currently Squash Director at City Squash in The Bronx, New York.
