= Moussa Helal =

Egyptian squash player

Personal information
- Nationality: Egyptian/British
- Born: 30 November 1949 Cairo, Egypt

Sport
- Highest ranking: 21 (April 1980)

Moussa Helal (born 30 November 1949) is an Egyptian former professional squash player. He reached a career high ranking of 21 in the world during April 1980 and was world No. 2 in the over-35s.

== Biography ==
Helal won the 1975 Egyptian Amateur Championship and the 1976 British Open Plate competition.

moved to Manchester in England and became a British citizen in 1984, entering the British rankings for the first time. He represented Cheshire at county level before retiring to become a squash coach.

He also lived in Warley in the West Midlands.

== Family ==
His eldest daughter, Amina Helal, is also a squash player and is a former American Inter-Collegiate squash champion. His younger daughter, Jessica Helal is a squash coach in California.
