= Rahmat Khan =

Pakistani squash player

Personal information
- Nationality: Pakistani
- Born: c.1945

Sport
- Highest ranking: 13 (July 1975)

Rehmatullah Khan also known as Rahmat Khan or Rehmat Khan (born c.1945) is a Pakistani former international squash player. He reached a career high ranking in the world of No. 13 in July 1975 and was one of the world's leading coaches, most notably coaching Jahangir Khan.

== Biography ==
Khan was active during the 1970s and 1980s and was part of the Khan squash family. He was the son of Nasrullah Khan and cousin of Torsam Khan and Jahangir Khan.

In 1973, he was a professional at the Lansdowne Club in London. In 1975 he was world ranked number 13 and was still in the top 20 of the world in 1979.

Rahmat Khan formed a close friendship with Torsam Khan and the pair bought a squash club in Sussex, England. However, after Torsam's early death in 1979, Rahmat decided to concentrate on coaching Torsam's younger brother Jahangir. He persuaded Jahangir to come to England from Karachi and in 1981 he became the youngest ever world champion aged just 17 and remained unbeaten for five years and 555 matches.

Rahmat also coached many other players including Jonathon Power of Canada. He later became national coach of Pakistan and Kuwait.
