= Qamar Zaman =

Pakistani squash player (born 1952)

Qamar Zaman PP
Personal information
- Nationality: Pakistani
- Born: 11 April 1952 (age 74) Quetta, Balochistan, Pakistan

Sport
- Highest ranking: 1 (January 1975 - won the British Open Squash Championships))
Medal record
Men's squash
Representing Pakistan
World Championships
Silver medal – second place	1977 Adelaide	Singles
Silver medal – second place	1979 Toronto	Singles
Silver medal – second place	1980 Adelaide	Singles
Silver medal – second place	1984 Karachi	Singles
Bronze medal – third place	1976 London	Singles
Bronze medal – third place	1981 Toronto	Singles
World Amateur Squash Championship
Silver medal – second place	1983 Auckland	Singles

Qamar Zaman (born 11 April 1952) is a former squash player from Pakistan. He was one of the leading squash players in the 1970s and 1980s. His biggest triumph was winning the British Open Squash Championships in 1975. He is referred to as 'The Stroke Master'.

== Career ==
Qamar won the Pakistan junior squash championship in 1968. On his first trip to the United Kingdom in 1973, he reached the semi-finals of the British Amateur Championship. In 1974, he reached the semi-finals of the British Open and won the Australian Amateur championship.

In the 1975 British Open, Qamar stunned and beat the defending champion Geoff Hunt of Australia in the quarter-finals, and went on to win the title, beating fellow Pakistani player Gogi Alauddin in the final 9-7, 9-6, 9-1.

Subsequently, Qamar reached the British Open final on four further occasions. He was runner-up to Hunt in 1978, 1979 and 1980, and to the legendary Jahangir Khan in 1984. He was also runner-up at the World Open four times, losing to Hunt in the finals of 1976, 1979 and 1980, and to Jahangir in 1984.

== Family ==
His father Moammed Ayub Zaman was a tennis and squash professional and his uncle Aftab Jawaid was a notable squash player.

== Awards and recognition ==
- Pride of Performance Award by the President of Pakistan in 1984.

Sporting positions
Preceded by — Geoff Hunt	World No. 1 February 1975 - January 1976; January 1981 - December 1981	Succeeded by Geoff Hunt; Jahangir Khan
