= Mohibullah Khan =

Pakistani squash player

Personal information
- Nationality: Pakistani
- Born: 21 July 1956

Sport
- Highest ranking: 2 (February 1976)
Medal record
Men's squash
Representing Pakistan
World Championships
Silver medal – second place	1976 London	Singles
Bronze medal – third place	1977 Adelaide	Singles
Bronze medal – third place	1979 Toronto	Singles
Bronze medal – third place	1980 Adelaide	Singles
British Amateur Championships
Gold medal – first place	1973/1974	singles
Gold medal – first place	1974/1975	singles

Mohibullah Khan (born 21 July 1956) is a former squash player from Pakistan. He was one of the sports leading players in the 1970s, reaching a career-high ranking of World No. 2. He was runner-up at the inaugural World Open in 1976, and at the British Open in 1976, losing on both occasions to Australia's Geoff Hunt.

== Athletic career ==
Khan twice won the British Amateur Squash Championships during the 1973/74 and 1974/75 seasons.

In 1976, Mohibullah Khan won the Pakistan International Airlines World Series in England. Queen Elizabeth II was the chief guest and gave him the winning trophy, a sword. Apart from this, he won the British Amateur Squash championships, Australian Open, New Zealand Open, US Championships, Alexandrian squash championships, French Open, and Pakistan Open.

As a 20-year-old at the inaugural 1976 Men's World Open Squash Championship, Khan reached the final, where he lost a 130 minute match to Geoff Hunt. It was the second longest match on record for a major final at the time.

Khan won the 1980 World Masters title defeating Gamal Awad in the final.

In February 1983, Khan received a nine year jail sentence at Reading crown court after being found guilty of smuggling £500,000 of heroin into Britain.

Khan's younger brother, Jansher Khan, became one of the dominant players in squash in the late 1980s and 1990s and Mohibullah Khan became his coach. Jansher Khan remained the World No. 1 squash player for many years, including a record of winning 8 World Open and 6 British Open titles. In 1993, the Pakistan team (Jansher Khan, Jahangir Khan, Zarak Jahan Khan, and Mir Zaman Gul) won the World Team Squash Championship under the coaching of Khan.

In recognition of Mohibullah's achievements for the country in the field of squash, President Farooq Ahmad Khan Leghari awarded him Pakistan's highest civil award. the Pride of Performance, in 1995.

The Federal Minister for IPC Mian Riaz Hussain Pirzada renamed PSB Squash complex Peshawar as Mohibullah Khan squash complex on 29 May 2015.

Khan serves on the Pakistan Sports Board as Director of the Squash Coaches of Pakistan. Since 2006, Khan has also run Mohibullah Khan Squash Academy in Peshawar under the Pakistan Sports Board. The academy trains players for Pakistan squash.
