= Mo Yasin =

Pakistani squash player and coach

Personal information
- Nationality: Pakistani

Sport
- Highest ranking: 11 (September 1976)
Medal record
British Open
| Silver medal – second place | 1974 Sheffield | singles |

Mohammed "Mo" Yasin (Urdu: محمد یاسین) is a squash coach and retired squash player from Pakistan. One of the leading players in the game in the 1970s,

== Biography ==
Yasin lived in Wembley, north-west London, from 1974 and was a finalist in the 1974 British Open. Yasin is famous for beating world champion Jonah Barrington and preventing him for equalling Hashim Khan's record of seven British Open titles at that time in 1974. He did not play the final due to his ankle injury while playing with Qamar Zaman in the semi-final.

By 1990 he was a three-time winner of the over-45 British Open.

After retiring from squash, Yasin took up coaching and coached players including Jansher Khan.
