= Ian Robinson (squash player) =

English squash player

Personal information
- Born: 12 September 1952 (age 73) York, England

Sport
- Country: England

Men's singles
- Highest ranking: No. 19 (January 1982)
Medal record
Men's squash
Representing Great Britain
World Team Championships
Gold medal – first place	1976 Birmingham	Team
Representing England
European Team Championships
Gold medal – first place	1975 Dublin	Team
Gold medal – first place	1976 Brussels	Team
Gold medal – first place	1977 Sheffield	Team
Gold medal – first place	1978 Amsterdam	Team
Gold medal – first place	1979 Hamburg	Team
Gold medal – first place	1982 Cardiff	Team

Ian Robinson (born 12 September 1952) is a former English professional squash player.

== Biography ==
Robinson was born in York on 12 September 1952 and lives in Liphook, Hampshire. He first played squash in 1961 at St Peters School, York and was champion of Yorkshire eight times.

He represented Great Britain during the 1976, 1977 & 1981 World Team Squash Championships and his finest success came at the 1976 Men's World Team Squash Championships, when he helped Great Britain become world champions with Jonathan Leslie, Stuart Courtney and Philip Ayton.

Robinson won six gold medals for the England men's national squash team at the European Squash Team Championships in 1975, 1976, 1977, 1978, 1979 and 1982.
