= Bruce Brownlee =

New Zealand squash player

Personal information
- Nationality: New Zealander
- Born: 1955
- Died: New Zealand

Sport
- Highest ranking: 6 (January 1981)
Medal record
Men's squash
Representing New Zealand
World Team Championships
Silver medal – second place	1977 Toronto	Team
British Amateur Championships
Gold medal – first place	1976/1977	singles

Bruce Brownlee (born 1955) is a former professional squash player fron New Zealand. He reached a career high ranking of 6 in the world during January 1981 and won a silver medal at the World Team Championships.

== Biography ==
Brownlee was introduced to squash by his father Colin in Rotorua. During the 1976/77 season he won the British Amateur Squash Championships, defeating Jonny Leslie in the final.

Brownlee won one New Zealand Open Championship and two national titles. He became a leading player in the late 1970s and early 1980s reaching a world ranking of six in January 1981. Whilst representing the Bay of Plenty he became the New Zealand number one and gained international honours.

He represented New Zealand in the 1976, 1977 and 1981 World Team Squash Championships. A hip injury forced his early retirement. He is married to Robyn Blackwood, a former leading women's player.
