= Gogi Alauddin =

Pakistani squash player (born 1950)

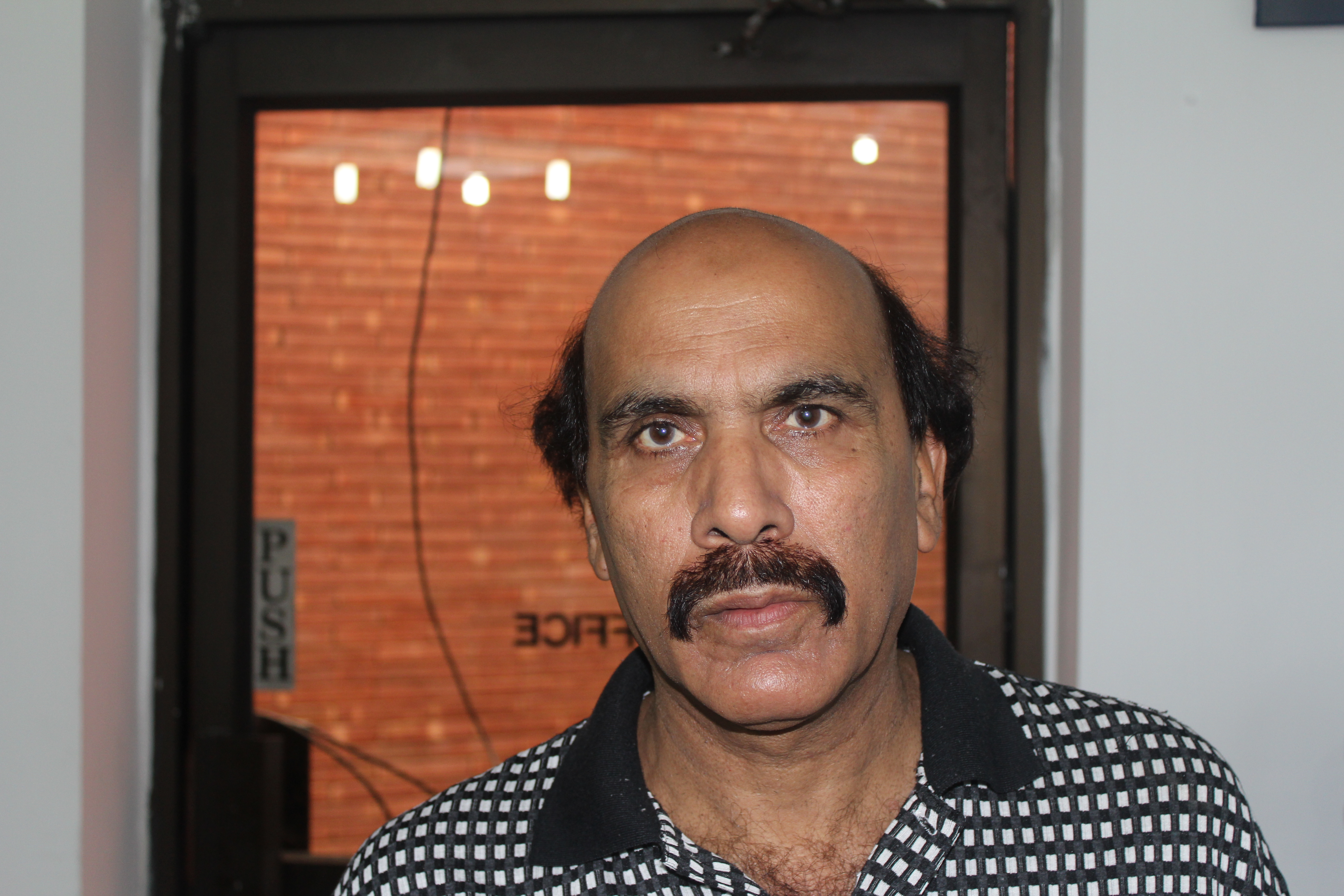

Personal information
- Nationality: Pakistani
- Born: 9 September 1950 (age 75) Lahore, Pakistan

Sport
- Turned pro: 1973
- Retired: 1986

Men's singles
- Highest ranking: No. 3 (January 1975)
- Title: 3
- Tour final: 2 (British Open: 1973, 1975)
Medal record
Men's squash
Representing Pakistan
World Championships
Bronze medal – third place	1976 London	Singles
Bronze medal – third place	1977 Adelaide	Singles
British Amateur Championships
Gold medal – first place	1970/1971	singles
Gold medal – first place	1971/1972	singles

Gogi Alauddin (born 9 September 1950) is a former squash player from Pakistan. He was one of the game's leading players in the 1970s.

== Biography ==
Alauddin won the British Amateur Championship in 1970/71 and 1971/72, and the Pakistan Open in 1972 and 1973. He was also runner-up at the British Open in 1973 and 1975. In the 1973 British Open, Gogi defeated the great Geoff Hunt in the semi-finals but lost to Jonah Barrington in the final. Gogi reached a career-high world ranking of World No. 2.

His nephew Sohail Qaiser was also a Pakistani international squash player. Since retiring as a player, he has worked as a squash coach. He is considered one of the best squash coaches of all time by many professionals. His son is the captain of the Trinity College squash team, which once defeated the Harvard squash team as well.

Gogi made a post-retirement appearance in 2012 as a player at the FMC 2nd Asian Squash Masters Tournament, where he won a gold medal for his age bracket (60+).
