= Cam Nancarrow =

Australian squash player (born 1945)

Personal information
- Nationality: Australian
- Born: 9 April 1945 (age 81) Sydney, Australia

Sport
- Turned pro: 1973

Men's Singles
- Highest ranking: 2
Medal record
World Team Championships
Gold medal – first place	1967 Sydney	Team
Gold medal – first place	1969 Midlands	Team
Gold medal – first place	1971 Auckland	Team
Gold medal – first place	1973 Johannesburg	Team
World Amateur Championship
Silver medal – second place	1967 Melbourne	Singles
Silver medal – second place	1971 Hamilton	Singles
Gold medal – first place	1973 South Africa	Singles
British Amateur Championships
Gold medal – first place	1972/1973	singles

Cameron Nancarrow (born 9 April 1945), is a former squash player from Australia, who was one of the game's leading world players in the 1960s and 1970s.

== State and national representative career ==
Nancarrow made the New South Wales men's team in the 1960s and was a part of their legacy when between 1958 and 1973 members of that team won 78 consecutive matches at Australian carnivals. Nancarrow, Ken Hiscoe, Ted Hamilton, Lionel Robberds and others participated in that time in the four-man squad which eventually recorded a loss to Queensland in 1974.

From 1967 till 1973 Nancarrow was named in every Australian national men’s team selected to compete at the World Men’s Team Championship governed by the World Squash Federation. Those sides were selected in 1967, 1969, 1971, 1973 and 1976 when he was named captain.

== Individual accolades ==
Nancarrow won the World Amateur Squash Championship in 1973, having finished runner-up in that competition in 1967 and 1971 and won the British Amateur Squash Championships during the 1972/73 season.

He was also runner-up at the British Open in 1969 and 1977. In March 2008, he was added to the Squash Australia Hall of Fame.

== Personal ==
He is the step-father of 1980s and 1990s squash top player Tristan Nancarrow.

The name Nancarrow is of Cornish origin meaning "valley of the deer".
