= Kevin Shawcross =

Australian squash player

Personal information
- Nationality: Australian
- Born: 3 December 1948 Lithgow, New South Wales, Australia
- Died: 3 June 1987 (aged 38)

Sport
- Highest ranking: 13 (April 1980)
Medal record
Men's squash
Representing Australia
World Amateur Championship
Gold medal – first place	1976 Wembley	Singles
World Team Championships
Bronze medal – third place	1976 England	Team
British Amateur Championships
Gold medal – first place	1975/1976	singles

Kevin Shawcross (3 December 1948 – 3 June 1987) was an Australian professional squash player who was the 1976 world amateur champion and won a world team bronze medal.

== Career ==
Born in Lithgow, New South Wales, Shawcross was a world's top 15 player. He represented Australia in the 1976 World Team Squash Championships, where he won a bronze medal.

Shawcross became the World Amateur Champion in 1976 after defeating Dave Scott from South Africa. One year previous he won both the Australian and British Amateur Championships.

He was unusual because he played weighing in at 101 kilograms (16 stone) and was 6 feet 2 inches tall. He died at the early age of 38 following a heart attack.
