= Torsam Khan =

Pakistani squash player

Personal information
- Born: 1952 Nawakille, Peshawar
- Died: November 28, 1979 (aged 26–27) Adelaide, Australia

Sport
- Country: Pakistan

Torsam Khan (sometimes spelled "Torsan Khan") (1952-1979) was a squash player from Pakistan. He belonged to a Pashtun family from Nawakille, Peshawar, Pakistan. He is the son of the 1957 British Open champion Roshan Khan, and the older brother of the great Jahangir Khan, who went on to become arguably the greatest squash player of all time. Torsam was moulded into a squash player by his father. In 1979, Torsam reached a career-high ranking of World No. 13 and was elected President of the International Squash Players Association. However that November, at the age of 27 and seemingly in excellent health, Torsam suffered a heart attack during a tournament match in Australia and died suddenly. His death profoundly affected his younger brother Jahangir, who was aged 15 at the time.

Jahangir once revealed in a documentary telecasted on GEO Super that at the time of his death, Torsam had been on the verge of quitting as a player in order to concentrate on coaching Jahangir. Jahangir considered quitting the game himself immediately after Torsam's death, but instead decided to pursue a career in the sport as a tribute to his brother. Coached by Rahmat Khan (a cousin who was a close friend of Torsam's), Jahangir went on to achieve unprecedented heights in the game including a 555-match unbeaten streak between 1981 and 1986.
