= Ahmed Safwat =

Egyptian squash player

Personal information
- Nationality: Egyptian
- Born: 6 June 1947 Cairo, Egypt
- Died: 30 July 2003 (aged 56) Egypt

Sport
- Highest ranking: 7 (January 1977)
Medal record
Men's squash
Representing Egypt
World Team Championships
| Bronze medal – third place | 1981 Sweden | Team |

Ahmed Safwat (6 June 1947 – 30 July 2003) was a professional squash player from Egypt. He reached a career high ranking of 7 in the world during January 1977 and won a bronze medal for Egypt men's national squash team at the World Team Championships.

== Biography ==
Born in Cairo on 6 June 1947, he was the son of a diplomat and turned professional in 1971. He moved to London and won the British Professional Championship seven times. He reached the semi-finals of the 1977 Men's British Open Squash Championship when he was ranked the second best player in the world. He also represented Egypt at the 1981 & 1983 World Team Squash Championships.

After Ahmed stopped playing competitively he proceeded to coach up and coming squash players.

Ahmed Safwat died of a heart attack aged 56 on 30 July 2003 whilst in his home country. He was due to take part in an over-50s tournament which was subsequently named in his honour. Ahmed was survived by wife and their four children.
