= Aly Abdel Aziz =

Egyptian squash player (born 1947)

Personal information
- Nationality: Egyptian
- Born: 1 October 1947
- Died: Alexandria, Egypt

Sport
- Highest ranking: 10 (January 1979)

Aly Abdel Aziz also known as Ali Aziz (Arabic: عَلِيّ عَبْد الْعَزِيز; born 1 October 1947) is an Egyptian former professional squash player. He reached a career high ranking of 10 in the world during January 1979.

== Biography ==
Aziz was born in Alexandria and started playing squash at the age of 13. He turned professional in 1957. He won the 1973 Egyptian Open and represented Egypt in the 1981 Men's World Team Squash Championships.

He won the 1974 Danish Open and 1982 Malaysian Open.
