= Abbas Kaoud =

Egyptian squash player

Personal information
- Nationality: Egyptian
- Born: 2 January 1948 (age 78) Cairo, Egypt

Sport
- Highest ranking: 15 (November 1976)

Abbas Kaoud (Arabic: عَبَّاس قَاعُود; born 2 January 1948) is an Egyptian former professional squash player. He reached his career best ranking of World No. 15 on 1 November 1976.

== Biography ==
Kaoud was born in Cairo, Egypt. He moved to Chatham, Kent and turned professional in 1973. He represented Egypt during the 1971 World Team Squash Championships.

He was a professional squash coach in Maidstone having previously fulfilled the same role at the Medway Squash Club.
