= List of Ohio suffragists =

This is a list of Ohio suffragists, suffrage groups and others associated with the cause of women's suffrage in Ohio.

== Groups ==
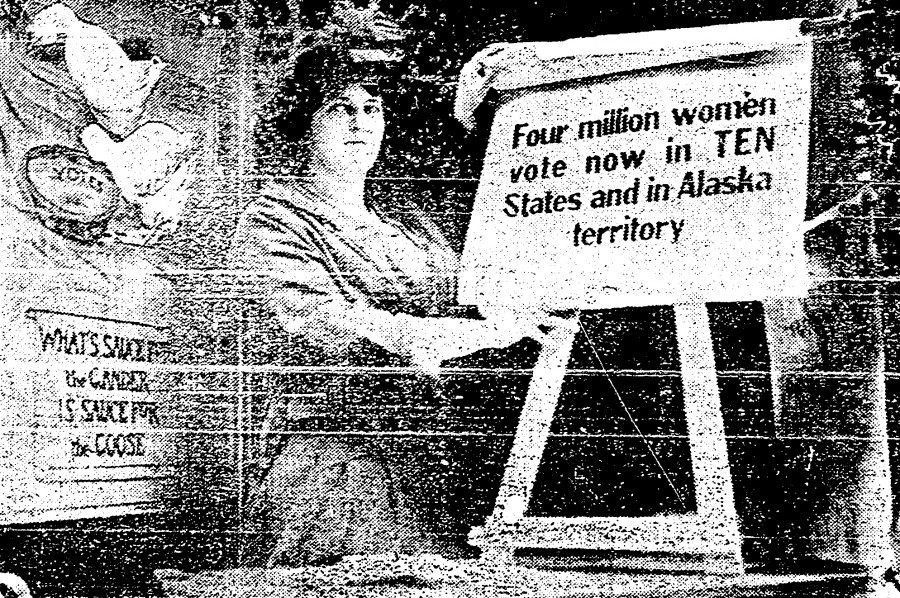
Marguerite Molliter in Gayety Theater in Cincinnati supporting women's suffrage in 1914

- Cincinnati Central Suffrage Committee.
- College Equal Suffrage League.
- Columbus Equal Suffrage League.
- Colored Women's Independent Political League (formerly the Colored Women's Republican Club).
- Cuyahoga County Woman's Suffrage Association (CCWSA), founded in 1910. Later became the Cleveland Woman's Suffrage Party or the Cuyahoga County Woman's Suffrage Party.
- Dayton Woman's Suffrage Association (DWSA) is created around 1869.
- Franklin County Woman Suffrage Association (FCWSA), formed in 1912.
- Hamilton County Suffrage Association.
- Men's Equal Suffrage League, established in Cleveland in 1911.
- Newbury Women's Suffrage Political Club.
- Ohio Men's League for Equal Suffrage, created in February 1912.
- Ohio Woman Suffrage Association (OWSA), founded in 1885 in Painesville.
- Ohio Women's Rights Association (OWRA), first met in Ravenna on May 25, 1853.
- Political Equality Club of Lima.
- Shelby Equal Franchise Association, formed in 1912.
- Sojourner Truth Women's Suffrage Association (STWSA).
- Suffrage Association of Warren.
- Suffrage Party of Lakewood.
- Toledo Women's Suffrage Association (TWSA) is founded in 1869.
- Woman Suffrage Party of Cleveland.
- Woman's Suffrage Association of Dayton and Montgomery County, formed in 1912.
- Woman's Suffrage Association of Richland County.

== Suffragists ==
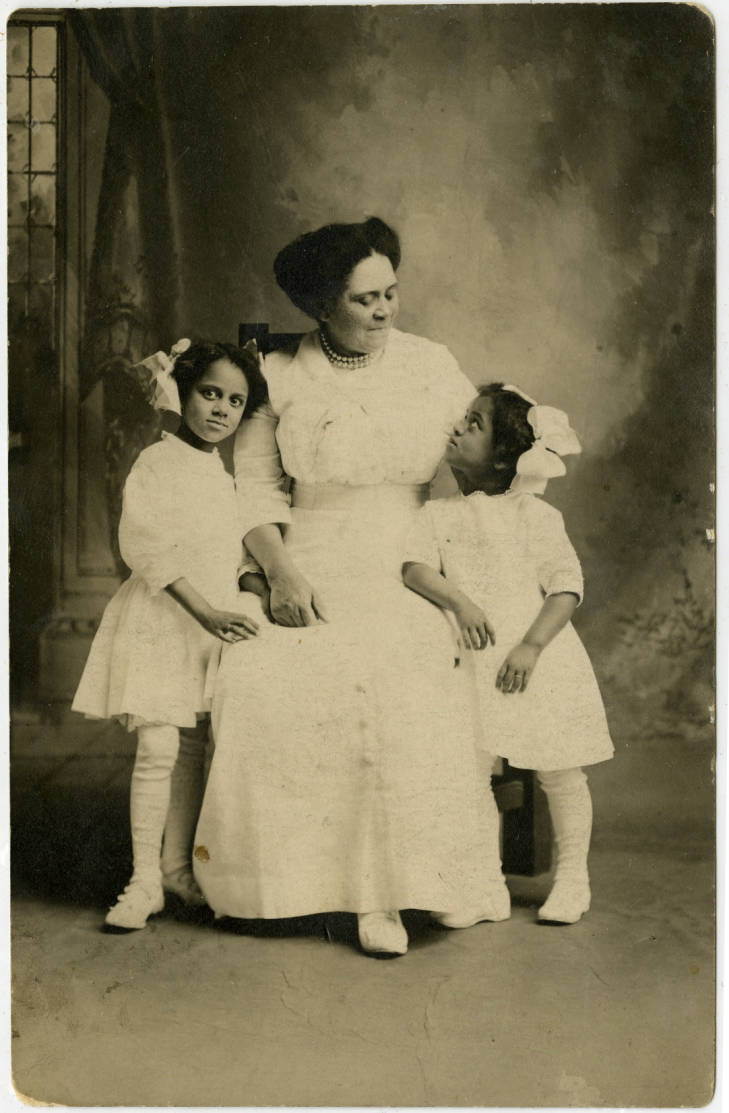
Hallie Q. Brown and nieces Frances and Lois Brown in 1913

- Florence E. Allen (Cleveland).
- Dora Bachman (Cincinnati).
- Elizabeth Bisbee (Columbus).
- Ella Reeve Bloor (Columbus).
- Minerva Kline Brooks (Cleveland).
- Hallie Quinn Brown (Wilberforce).
- Mary Edith Campbell (1876–1962) – first woman elected to the Board of Education in Cincinnati. (Cincinnati).
- Frances Jennings Casement.
- Katharine Benedicta Trotter Claypole (Akron).
- Carrie Williams Clifford (Cleveland).
- Harris R. Cooley (Cleveland).
- Elizabeth Greer Coit (Columbus).
- Olive Colton (Toledo).
- Hannah Cutler.
- Eliza Archard Conner (New Richmond).
- Anna Julia Cooper (Xenia).
- Betsy Mix Cowles (Ashtabula County).
- Bessie Crayton (Lima).
- Lucile Atcherson Curtis (Columbus).
- Hannah Cutler.
- Carrie Chase Davis.
- Jesse Davisson (Dayton).
- Edward A. Deeds (Dayton).
- Zell Hart Deming (Warren) – suffragist, philanthropist, newspaper editor and the treasurer of the Ohio State Suffrage Association
- Mary Douglas (Cincinnati).
- Zara DuPont (1869–1946) – first vice president of the Ohio Woman Suffrage Association (Cuyahoga).
- Dora Easton (Cincinnati).
- Louise Eastman (Cincinnati).
- Martha H. Elwell.
- Caroline McCullough Everhard (1843–1902) – American banker and suffragist, president of the Ohio Suffrage Association (Massillon).
- Sara Evan Fletcher
- Ellen Sulley Fray (Toledo).
- Trixie Friganza (Cincinnati).
- Frances Dana Gage.
- Edith J. Goode (Springfield).
- Josephine S. Griffing (Salem).
- Mary Belle Grossman (Cleveland).
- Laura C. Haeckl (Cincinnati).
- Elizabeth Hauser (Cleveland).
- Gillette Hayden (1880–1929) – dentist and periodontist.
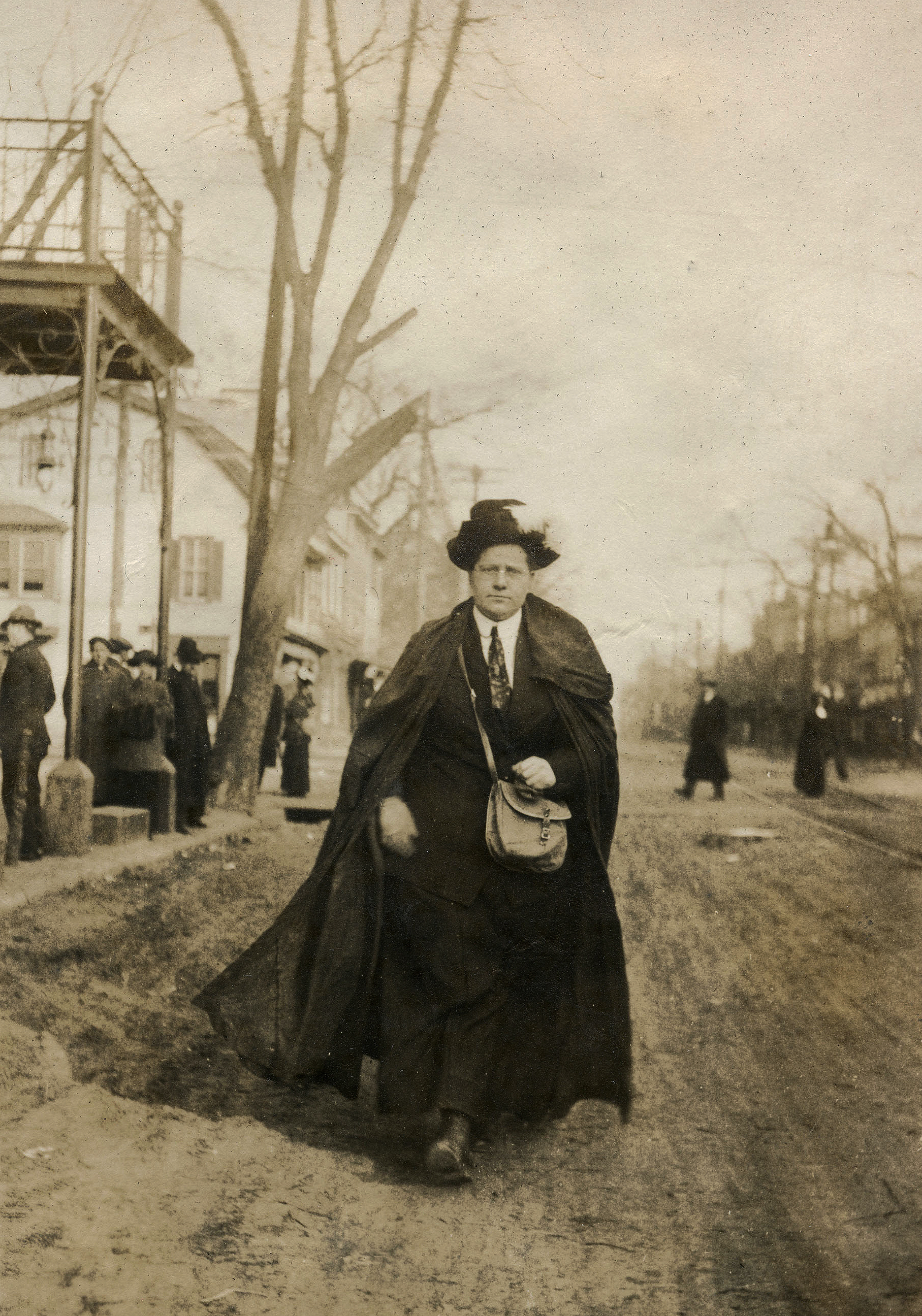
- Florence E. Allen marching for women's suffrage in 1913
  Jewelila Higgins (Dayton).
- Josephine Irwin (Cuyahoga County).
- Rachel S. A. Janney.
- Jane Hitchcock Jones.
- Harriet Keeler (Cleveland).
- Belle Coit Kelton (Columbus).
- Betsey Lewis (Warren).
- Elizabeth Margaret Vater Longley
- Mary MacMillan (Cincinnati).
- Helen Wise Mallony (Cincinnati).
- Lizzie Marvin (Shelby).
- Lucia McCurdy McBride (Cleveland).
- Dorothy Mead.
- Marguerite Molliter (Cincinnati).
- Henrietta G. Moore (Springfield).
- John Moore (president of the United Mine Workers of Ohio).
- Rosa Moorman.
- John H. Patterson (Dayton).
- Emma Maud Perkins (Cleveland).
- Edna Brush Perkins (Cleveland).
- Sarah Maria Clinton Perkins (Cleveland).
- Laura Proctor (Cincinnati).
- Mary Virginia Proctor (Lebanon).
- Bernice Pyke (Lakewood).
- H. Anna Quinby (Edenton).
- Kenyon Hayden Rector (Columbus).
- Nellie Robinson (Cincinnati).
- Viola D. Romans (Cincinnati).
- Sarah C. Schrader.
- Rosa L. Segur (Toledo).
- Julia Rice Seney (Toledo.)
- Caroline Severance.
- Lydia DeVilbiss Shauk (Shelby).
- Belle Sherwin (Cleveland).
- Sarah Siewers (Cincinnati).
- Ida Ricketts Snell (Cincinnati).
- Louise Southgate (Cincinnati).
- Louisa Southworth (Cleveland).
- Doris Stevens (Dayton).
- Pauline Perlmutter Steinem (Toledo).
- Charles F. Thwing (Cleveland).
- Harriet Taylor Upton (Warren).
- Maude Edith Comstock Waitt (Lakewood).
- Myron B. Vorce (Cleveland).
- Ella B Ensor Wilson (1838–1913) – social reformer.
- Alma Kephart Wilson (Cincinnati).
- Bettie Wilson (Cincinnati).
- Peter Witt (Cleveland).
- Clara Snell Wolfe.
- Victoria Claflin Woodhull (Massillon).
- Katharine Wright (Dayton).
- Orville Wright (Dayton).
- Mary Yeager (Cincinnati).

=== Politicians supporting women's suffrage ===
- Roland W. Baggott.
- Newton D. Baker (Cleveland).
- Ellsworth R. Bathrick (Akron).
- James M. Cox (Dayton).
- Joshua Giddings (Ashtabula County).
- Tom L. Johnson (Cleveland).
- William McKinley.
- Jacob Henry Miller.
- James A. Reynolds (Cuyahoga County).
- Ezra B. Taylor (Warren).
- Benjamin Wade (Ashtabula County).
- Brand Whitlock (Toledo).

== Places ==
- Harriet Taylor Upton House (Warren).

== Publications ==
- The Alliance.
- Everywoman.
- The Ohio Woman.

== Suffragists who campaigned in Ohio ==
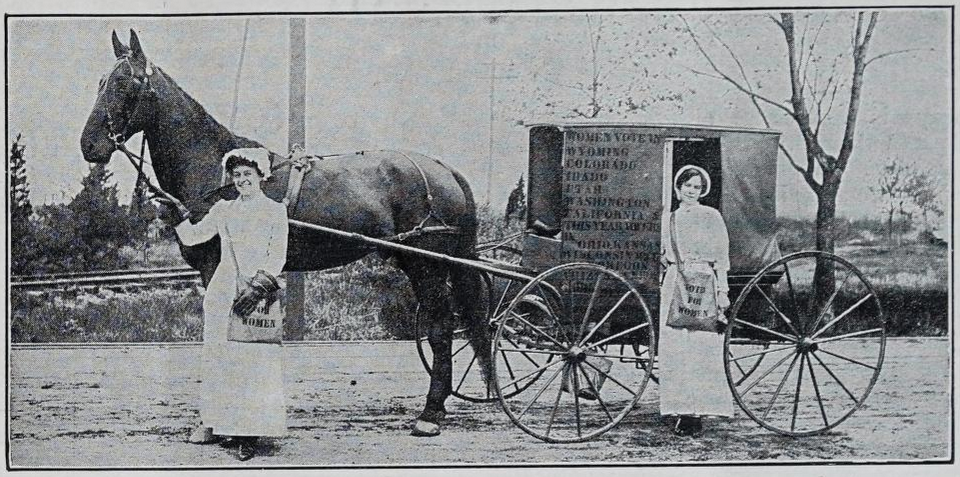
Rosalie G. Jones and Elizabeth Freeman take the Little Yellow Wagon out of Cleveland in July 1912

- Jane Addams.
- Susan B. Anthony.
- Antoinette Brown Blackwell.
- Carrie Chapman Catt.
- Margaret Foley.
- Elizabeth Freeman.
- Laura A. Gregg.
- Louise Hall.
- Julia Ward Howe.
- Laura M. Johns.
- Rosalie G. Jones.
- Elizabeth A. Kingsbury.
- Emmeline Pankhurst.
- Sylvia Pankhurst.
- Maud Wood Park.
- Emily Pierson.
- Jeannette Rankin.
- Rose Schneiderman.
- Anna Howard Shaw.
- Florence Sherwood, president of the Wage Earners' Suffrage League of Chicago.
- Elizabeth Cady Stanton.
- Lucy Stone.
- Jane Thompson.
- George Francis Train.
- Sojourner Truth.
- Camillo von Klenze.
- Zerelda G. Wallace.
- Bettina Borrmann Wells.
- Frances Woods.

== Anti-suffrage ==
Groups

- Cincinnati and Hamilton County Association Opposed to Woman Suffrage.
- Ohio Women's Anti-Suffrage League.

Anti-suffragists

- Mrs. Herman Hubbard (Columbus).
- Ruby Osborne (Cincinnati).
- Lucy Price.
- Maria Longworth Storer (Cincinnati).
- Katherine Talbott (Dayton).

== See also ==
- Timeline of women's suffrage in Ohio
- Women's suffrage in Ohio
- Women's suffrage in states of the United States
- Women's suffrage in the United States
