= 1985 Women's British Open Squash Championship =

British Open Squash Championships
- 57th Women's British Open Championships

Details
- Location: West Sussex and London, England
- Venue: East Grinstead and Wembley Conference Centre

The 1985 Women's Davies & Tate British Open Squash Championships was held at East Grinstead, West Sussex with the later stages being held at the Wembley Conference Centre in London from 15–23 April 1985. The event was won for the second consecutive year by Susan Devoy who defeated Martine Le Moignan in the final.

== Seeds ==
1. (New Zealand) Susan Devoy
2. (Guernsey) Martine Le Moignan
3. (Guernsey) Lisa Opie
4. (Australia) Jan Miller
5. (Australia) Rhonda Thorne - withdrew from tournament
6. (England) Alison Cumings
7. (England) Lucy Soutter
8. (Scotland) Heather Wallace

== Draw and results ==
=== First round ===
Player one	Player two	Score
(New Zealand) Susan Devoy	(England) Samantha Langley	9-1 9-1 9-1
(England) Senga Macfie	(Australia) Joanne Ferry	10-8 9-1 9-1
(England) Nicki Spurgeon	(England) Sarah Stone	9-1 9-1 9-7
(England) Frances Candy	(Republic of Ireland) Brona Conway	9-6 9-7 5-9 9-2
(Scotland) Heather Wallace	(Netherlands) Babette Hoogendoorn	9-2 9-1 9-2
(New Zealand) Donna Gurran	(England) Sandra Wrench	9-0 9-7 9-7
(New Zealand) Robyn Blackwood	(England) Wendy Cole	9-2 9-0 9-0
(England) Ruth Strauss	(Switzerland) Barbara Hartmann	9-2 9-6 10-8
(Australia) Jan Miller	(England) Fiona Geaves	9-0 9-0 9-0
(Wales) Debbie Turnbull	(Australia) Hilary Tudor	9-2 94- 9-5
(Republic of Ireland) Mary Byrne	(England) B Boddington	9-4 9-0 9-5
(Australia) Robyn Belford	(England) Joyce Toumey	9-4 9-1 9-0
(England) Angela Smith	(New Zealand) Linda McClure	9-3 9-4 9-4
(England) Karen Butterworth	(Republic of Ireland) Barbara Lowans	9-2 9-4 9-1
(Australia) Robyn Friday	(South Africa) Cindy Robarts	9-0 9-0 9-2
(Belgium) Noel Tracey	(England) T Davey	9-5 7-9 10-8 9-2
(Guernsey) Martine Le Moignan	(Australia) Lynn Ferry	9-1 9-1 9-3
(England) Barbara Diggens	(England) Janet Partington	9-4 9-2 9-1
(England) Suzanne Burgess	(England) Heather Rutt	9-4 9-5 9-0
(Australia) Carol Kennewell	(Republic of Ireland) Rebecca Best	9-0 9-3 9-5
(England) Lucy Soutter	(England) Jane Parker	9-0 9-0 9-0
(England) Tracy Cunliffe	(Jamaica) Susan Lawrence	9-0 9-5 9-0
(Australia) Liz Irving	(England) Claire Candy	9-3 10-8 5-9 9-7
(South Africa) Donna Caldwell	(England) Carol Machin	9-1 9-0 9-3
(Guernsey) Lisa Opie	(Scotland) Joyce Leach	9-2 9-0 9-0
(England) Alex Cowie		
(England) Sue Cogswell	(Netherlands) Mandy Sommers	9-0 9-0 9-1
(Australia) Michelle Toon	(England) Flavia Roberts	9-0 9-7 9-10 4-9 9-4
(England) Alison Cumings	(Australia) Eryi Emmanuel	9-2 9-1 9-1
(Australia) Carin Clonda	(England) Annette Pilling	9-0 9-5 9-3
(Australia) Rae Anderson	(England) Sheila White	9-1 9-3 9-3
(Australia) Sharon Bradey	(England) Melanie Warren-Hawkes	5-9 3-9 9-2 9-5 9-7

=== Second round ===
Player one	Player two	Score
(New Zealand) Devoy	(England) Macfie	9-3 9-0 9-1
(England) Spurgeon	(England) Candy	9-7 9-2 9-0
(Scotland) Wallace	(New Zealand) Gurran	9-1 9-2 9-1
(New Zealand) Blackwood	(England) Strauss	1-9 9-4 9-3 6-9
(Australia) Miller	(Wales) Turnbull	9-5 9-2 9-2
(Republic of Ireland) Byrne	(Australia) Belford	9-7 9-1 6-9 6-9 9-4
(England) Smith	(England) Butterworth	9-0 9-3 3-9 9-6
(Australia) Friday	(Belgium) Tracey	9-0 9-1 9-0
(Guernsey) Le Moignan	(England) Diggens	9-1 9-0 9-3
(England) Burgess	(Australia) Kennewell	9-7 9-0 6-9 9-1
(England) Soutter	(England) Cunliffe	9-6 9-4 9-5
(Australia) Irving	(South Africa) Caldwell	10-8 9-6 0-9 4-9 9-5
(Guernsey) Opie	(England) Cowie	9-5 9-3 9-6
(England) Cogswell	(Australia) Toon	9-1 9-2 7-9 10-8
(England) Cumings	(Australia) Clonda	9-2 9-3 9-2
(Australia) Anderson	(Australia) Bradey	9-5 9-0 9-6

=== Third round ===
Player one	Player two	Score
(New Zealand) Devoy	(England) Spurgeon	9-0 9-2 9-0
(Scotland) Wallace	(New Zealand) Blackwood	9-4 9-0 9-2
(Australia) Miller	(Republic of Ireland) Byrne	9-1 9-1 9-1
(England) Smith	(Australia) Friday	9-1 9-3 10-9
(Guernsey) Le Moignan	(England) Burgess	9-3 9-4 9-4
(England) Soutter	(Australia) Irving	9-5 8-10 9-2 9-0
(Guernsey) Opie	(England) Cogswell	7-9 5-9 9-6 9-1 10-9
(England) Cumings	(Australia) Anderson	9-3 9-7 9-4

=== Quarter-finals ===
Player one	Player two	Score
(New Zealand) Devoy	(Scotland) Wallace	9-4 3-9 10-8 9-1
(Australia) Miller	(England) Smith	9-2 9-1 9-7
(Guernsey) Le Moignan	(England) Soutter	4-9 6-9 9-6 9-1 9-3
(Guernsey) Opie	(England) Cumings	9-5 4-9 7-9 10-9 9-3

=== Semi-finals ===
Player one	Player two	Score
(New Zealand) Devoy	(Australia) Miller	9-2 9-0 9-5
(Guernsey) Le Moignan	(Guernsey) Opie	10-9 9-7 9-7

=== Final ===
Player one	Player two	Score
(New Zealand) Devoy	(Guernsey) Le Moignan	9-6 5-9 9-6 9-5

Preceded by 1984	British Open Squash Championships; London, England; 1985	Succeeded by 1986
