= 1985 Women's World Open Squash Championship =

Women's World Open 1985
- 5th WISPA World Squash Championship
- Location: (Republic of Ireland) Dublin, Ireland
- Date: August 25–30, 1985

WISPA World Tour
- Category: World Open

Results
- Champion: (New Zealand) Susan Devoy
- Runner-up: (England) Lisa Opie
- Semi-finalists: (Guernsey) Martine Le Moignan (England) Lucy Soutter

The 1985 Women's 7-Up World Open Squash Championship was the women's edition of the 1985 World Open, which serves as the individual world championship for squash players. The event took place in Dublin in Ireland during August 1985. Susan Devoy won the World Open title, defeating Lisa Opie in the final.

== Seeds ==
1. (New Zealand) Susan Devoy (Champion)
2. (Guernsey) Martine Le Moignan (Semifinals)
3. (Guernsey) Lisa Opie (Final)
4. (Australia) Jan Miller (Quarterfinals)

== Draw and results ==
Second round
1	(New Zealand) Susan Devoy	9	9	9
(Switzerland) Barbara Hartmann	0	0	0
(Australia) Tracey Smith	9	9	9
(United States) Gail Ramsay	0	4	3
(England) Angela Smith	9	10	2	10	9
(England) Alex Cowie	10	8	9	8	4
(New Zealand) Donna Gurran	7	7	9	9	10
(New Zealand) Robyn Blackwood	9	9	5	2	8
(England) Lucy Soutter	9	9	9
(Zimbabwe) S Bromhead	1	1	0
(Australia) Carin Clonda	9	9	9
(England) Tracy Cunliffe	3	2	5
4	(Australia) Jan Miller	9	9	9
(England) Sheila White	6	5	1
(Republic of Ireland) Mary Byrne	5	9	9	6	9
(Australia) Danielle Drady	9	5	2	9	3
2	(Guernsey) Martine Le Moignan	9	9	9
(Australia) Michelle Martin	0	0	2
(England) Fiona Geaves	9	9	10
(Canada) Joyce Maycock	2	5	8
(Scotland) Heather Wallace	9	9	9
(Republic of Ireland) Caroline McCullough	0	0	4
(England) Sue Cogswell	9	8	10	10
(Australia) Sarah Fitzgerald	6	10	8	8
3	(Guernsey) Lisa Opie	9	9	9
(New Zealand) Gillian Oakley	1	1	1
(Australia) Robyn Friday	9	9	9
(Hong Kong) Dawn Olsen	1	1	0
(England) Alison Cumings	9	9	9
(Australia) Sally-Anne Robbie	3	0	3
(Australia) Diane Davis	9	9	9
(Netherlands) Magriet Luchs	4	1	1

Second round
1	(New Zealand) Devoy	6	9	9	9
(Australia) Smith T	9	1	2	2
(England) Smith A	9	8	9	9
(New Zealand) Gurran	4	10	7	0
(England) Soutter	9	7	9	4	9
(Australia) Clonda	5	9	7	9	6
4	(Australia) Miller	5	6	9	9	9
(Republic of Ireland) Byrne	9	9	0	1	2
2	(Guernsey) Le Moignan	9	9	9
(England) Geaves	0	3	2
(Scotland) Wallace	9	9	7	9
(England) Cogswell	6	5	9	0
3	(Guernsey) Opie	9	10	9
(Australia) Friday	3	9	5
(England) Cumings	9	9	9
(Australia) Davis	5	7	5

Quarter-finals
1	(New Zealand) Devoy	9	9	9
(England) Smith	3	4	0
(England) Soutter	9	10	9
4	(Australia) Miller	0	8	3
2	(Guernsey) Le Moignan	3	9	9	9
(Scotland) Wallace	9	1	2	6
3	(Guernsey) Opie	9	9	5	9
(England) Cumings	2	4	9	6

Semi-finals
1	(New Zealand) Devoy	9	9	9
(England) Soutter	2	5	1
Final
1	(New Zealand) Devoy	9	9	10
3	(Guernsey) Opie	4	5	8
2	(Guernsey) Le Moignan	6	9	3	5
3	(Guernsey) Opie	9	7	9	9

=== Notes ===
Susan Devoy won her first World Open and would go on to win four in total.

== See also ==
- World Open
- 1985 Men's World Open Squash Championship

Preceded by Perth (Australia); 1983	World Open; Ireland (Dublin); 1985	Succeeded by Auckland (New Zealand); 1987
