= 1987 Women's World Open Squash Championship =

Women's World Open 1987
- 6th WISPA World Squash Championship
- Location: Auckland, New Zealand
- Date: September 29 - October 6, 1987

WISPA World Tour
- Category: World Open
- Prize money: $30,000

Results
- Champion: (New Zealand) Susan Devoy
- Runner-up: (Guernsey) Lisa Opie
- Semi-finalists: (Australia) Liz Irving (Australia) Vicki Cardwell

The 1987 Women's Honda World Open Squash Championship was the women's edition of the 1987 World Open, which serves as the individual world championship for squash players. The event took place at the Henderson Squash Club and YMCA Stadium in Auckland in New Zealand between September 29 and October 6, 1987. Susan Devoy won her second World Open title, defeating Lisa Opie in a repeat of the 1985 final.

== Seeds ==
1. (New Zealand) Susan Devoy (champion)
2. (Guernsey) Lisa Opie (final)
3. (Australia) Vicki Cardwell nee Hoffman (semifinals)
4. (England) Lucy Soutter (quarterfinals)
5. (Guernsey) Martine Le Moignan (quarterfinals)
6. (Australia) Liz Irving (semifinals)
7. (England) Alison Cumings (quarterfinals)
8. (Australia) Robyn Friday (quarterfinals)
9. (England) Suzanne Burgess (third round)
10. (Canada) Heather Wallace (fourth round)
11. (Australia) Sarah Fitzgerald (fourth round)
12. (Australia) Michelle Martin (fourth round)
13. (New Zealand) Joanne Williams (fourth round)
14. (England) Angela Smith (fourth round)
15. (Australia) Danielle Drady (fourth round)
16. (Republic of Ireland) Mary Byrne (third round)

== First round (29 Sep) ==
Player One	Player Two	Score
(Sweden) A Jonsson	(Australia) Julie Belsham	3-0
(Canada) L Noel	(New Zealand) M Galloway	3-0
(Scotland) Alison Cruickshank	(Netherlands) Marjolein Houtsma	3-0
(Sweden) Tinna Backlund	(Australia) Robyn Prentice	3-2
(New Zealand) Diane Ellis	(Norway) Guri Lenth	3-0
(Canada) Gail Pimm	(New Zealand) Carolyn Viggers	3-0
(Netherlands) Hugoline Van Hoorn	(Wales) Tracey Thomas	3-0
(New Zealand) Fleur Townsend	(France) Nathalie Cornet	3-0
(New Zealand) Carol Laing	(United States) Diana Staley	3-0
(Wales) Sharon Stevenson	(Sweden) Lena Fridén	3-1
(Republic of Ireland) A Holden	(New Zealand) E Rameka	3-0
(Wales) Sian Johnson	(New Zealand) Freda Walker	3-2
(Sweden) Eva Svenby	(New Zealand) Kay Jackson	3-1
(Norway) Cecilie Schjander	(New Zealand) Sarah Kearney	3-0
(France) Corinne Castets	(New Zealand) Lynora Hati	w/o
(Netherlands) Magriet Luchs	(New Zealand) G Keegan	3-0
(Sweden) Tina Dahl	(Wales) Debbie Turnbull	3-0
(New Zealand) Debra Shaw	(Japan) Sachi Akiyama	3-0
(France) Catherine Lebossé	(New Zealand) Justine Marriott	3-1
(Canada) Nancy Cranbury	(New Zealand) Judy Burgess	3-0
(England) Karen Read	(Scotland) Joan Sutherland	3-1
(West Germany) Andrea Holbe	(New Zealand) Linda McClure	3-2
(Norway) Astrid Åbyholm	(New Zealand) J Smith	3-0
(New Zealand) C Hayes	(Scotland) Joyce Leach	3-0
(Japan) Machiko Miyagishima	(New Zealand) Angela Toal	3-1
(New Zealand) Jaclyn Hawkes	(Wales) Sarah Fury	3-0
(New Zealand) Sharyn Taylor	(Japan) Miyuki Fukutomi (née Adachi)	3-0
(Canada) Joyce Maycock	(West Germany) Eva Körschgen	3-0
(France) Sabine Vinci	(New Zealand) H Booth	3-0
(New Zealand) Jean Tapp	(Netherlands) Mariëtte Remijnse	3-2
(New Zealand) Jenny Webster	(Canada) A Levy	3-0
(England) Alex Cowie	(Republic of Ireland) Caroline Collins	3-0

== Second round (30 Sep) ==
Player One	Player Two	Score
(New Zealand) Susan Devoy	(Sweden) A Jonsson	9-0 9-0 9-0
(Scotland) Shirley Brown	(Canada) L Noel	9-1 9-1 9-3
(New Zealand) Joanne Williams	(Scotland) Alison Cruickshank	9-7 9-2 9-0
(West Germany) Beate Müller	(Sweden) Tinna Backlund	9-2 10-8 9-4
(England) Alison Cumings	(New Zealand) Diane Ellis	9-1 9-1 9-1
(England) Flavia Roberts	(Canada) Gail Pimm	9-2 9-4 5-9 5-9 1-9
(Republic of Ireland) Mary Byrne	(Netherlands) Hugoline Van Hoorn	10-9 9-0 9-3
(England) Fiona Geaves	(New Zealand) Fleur Townsend	9-1 9-2 9-4
(England) Lucy Soutter	(New Zealand) Carol Laing	9-0 9-0 9-0
(West Germany) Barbara Hammerschmidt	(Wales) Sharon Stevenson	4-9 8-10 0-9
(England) Suzanne Burgess	(Republic of Ireland) A Holden	9-4 9-0 9-0
(Republic of Ireland) Rebecca Best	(Wales) Sian Johnson	9-1 9-1 9-2
(Australia) Liz Irving	(Sweden) Eva Svenby	9-1 9-2 9-4
(United States) Alicia McConnell	(Norway) Cecilie Schjander	9-0 9-3 9-1
(Australia) Sarah Fitzgerald	(France) Corinne Castets	9-1 9-4 9-1
(New Zealand) Donna Gurran	(Netherlands) Magriet Luchs	9-6 9-0 9-2
(Netherlands) Babette Hoogendoorn	(Sweden) Tina Dahl	9-0 9-4 9-3
(England) Angela Smith	(New Zealand) Debra Shaw	9-3 9-4 9-0
(Republic of Ireland) Marjorie Burke	(France) Catherine Lebossé	7-9 9-3 9-2 9-3
(Guernsey) Martine Le Moignan	(Canada) Nancy Cranbury	9-1 9-1 9-0
(England) Melanie Warren-Hawkes	(England) Karen Read	9-0 9-4 9-0
(Canada) Heather Wallace	(West Germany) Andrea Holbe	9-5 9-1 9-1
(Australia) Carin Clonda	(Norway) Astrid Åbyholm	5-9 2-9 8-10
(Australia) Vicki Cardwell	(New Zealand) C Hayes	9-0 9-1 9-0
(New Zealand) Cheryl Te Kani	(Japan) Machiko Miyagishima	9-2 9-2 9-6
(Australia) Danielle Drady	(New Zealand) Jaclyn Hawkes	9-0 9-1 9-6
(Australia) Sharon Bradey	(New Zealand) Sharyn Taylor	9-5 9-9 9-0
(Australia) Robyn Friday	(Canada) Joyce Maycock	9-2 9-4 9-1
(Sweden) Susanne Nyberg	(France) Sabine Vinci	9-6 9- 7 9-6
(Australia) Michelle Martin	(New Zealand) Jean Tapp	9-1 9-4 9-5
(New Zealand) Marie Pearson	(New Zealand) Jenny Webster	10-8 9-5 9-3
(Guernsey) Lisa Opie	(England) Alex Cowie	9-1 9-6 9-1

== Third round to final ==
Third round
1	(New Zealand) Devoy	9	9	9
(Scotland) Brown	0	0	0
13	(New Zealand) Williams	9	9	9
(West Germany) Muller	0	3	1
7	(England) Cumings	9	9	9
(Canada) Pimm	3	1	1
16	(Republic of Ireland) Byrne	9	0	7	2
(England) Geaves	3	9	9	9
6	(Australia) Irving	9	9	9	9
(United States) McConnell	10	5	4	2
11	(Australia) Fitzgerald	8	9	9	9
(New Zealand) Gurran	10	2	1	3
4	(England) Soutter	9	9	9
(Wales) Stevenson	0	0	1
9	(England) Burgess	9	4	4	6
(Republic of Ireland) Best	3	9	9	9
2	(Guernsey) Opie	9	9	9
(New Zealand) Pearson	0	0	2
12	(Australia) Martin	10	9	9
(Sweden) Nyberg	8	0	0
8	(Australia) Friday	9	9	9
(Australia) Bradey	3	4	4
15	(Australia) Drady	9	9	9
(New Zealand) Te Kani	7	0	3
3	(Australia) Cardwell	9	9	9
(Norway) Abyholm	0	0	0
10	(Canada) Wallace	9	9	9
(Australia) Warren-Hawkes	3	1	4
5	(Guernsey) Le Moignan	9	9	9
(Republic of Ireland) Burke	0	0	1
14	(England) Smith	9	10	10
(Netherlands) Hoogendoorn	5	9	2	8

Fourth round
1	(New Zealand) Devoy	9	6	9	9
13	(New Zealand) Williams	0	5	4
7	(England) Cumings	9	9	9
(England) Geaves	1	3	1
6	(Australia) Irving	9	7	9	9
11	(Australia) Fitzgerald	6	9	5	6
4	(England) Soutter	9	9	9
(Republic of Ireland) Best	1	3	1
2	(Guernsey) Opie	9	9	9
12	(Australia) Martin	5	4	3
8	(Australia) Friday	9	9	9
15	(Australia) Drady	4	0	0
3	(Australia) Cardwell	9	9	9
10	(Canada) Wallace	2	1	0
5	(Guernsey) Le Moignan	9	9	9
14	(England) Smith	5	1	7

Quarter-finals
1	(New Zealand) Devoy	9	9	9
7	(England) Cumings	4	4	1
6	(Australia) Irving	9	9	6	9
4	(England) Soutter	3	3	9	7
2	(Guernsey) Opie	3	9	9
8	(Australia) Friday	3	6	3
3	(Australia) Cardwell	2	10	1	10	9
5	(Guernsey) Le Moignan	9	9	9	8	3

Semi-finals
1	(New Zealand) Devoy	9	9	9
6	(Australia) Irving	3	4	2
Final
1	(New Zealand) Devoy	9	10	9
2	(Guernsey) Opie	3	8	2
2	(Guernsey) Opie	10	9	8	4	9
3	(Australia) Cardwell	8	5	10	9	3

=== Notes ===
Susan Devoy won her second World Open and would go on to win four in total.

Preceded by Dublin (Ireland); 1985	World Open; New Zealand (Auckland); 1987	Succeeded by Warmond (Netherlands); 1989
