= 1993 Women's World Open Squash Championship =

Women's World Open 1993
- 10th WISPA World Squash Championship
- Location: Johannesburg, South Africa
- Date: 21–25 September 1993

WISPA World Tour
- Category: World Open
- Prize money: $45,000

Results
- Champion: (Australia) Michelle Martin
- Runner-up: (Australia) Liz Irving
- Semi-finalists: (Guernsey) Martine Le Moignan (Germany) Sabine Schoene

The 1993 Women's World Open Squash Championship was the women's edition of the 1993 World Open, which serves as the individual world championship for squash players. The event took place in Johannesburg in South Africa between 21 September and 25 September 1993. Michelle Martin won her first World Open title, defeating Liz Irving in the final.

== Seeds ==
1. (Australia) Michelle Martin (champion)
2. (Australia) Liz Irving (final)
3. (England) Cassie Jackman (quarterfinals)
4. (England) Suzanne Horner (quarterfinals)
5. (England) Sue Wright (quarterfinals)
6. (Guernsey) Martine Le Moignan (semifinals)
7. (Australia) Sarah Fitzgerald (quarterfinals)
8. (South Africa) Claire Nitch (second round)

== Draw and results ==
First round
1	(Australia) Michelle Martin	9	9	9
(South Africa) Thelma van Eck	3	3	3
(England) Fiona Geaves	9	9	9
(United States) Natalie Grainger	3	1	6
(Australia) Sarah Fitzgerald	5	9	9	9
(South Africa) Angelique Clifton-Parks	9	7	0	1
(England) Jane Martin	9	9	6	9
(Netherlands) Nicole Beumer	5	5	9	7
(Guernsey) Martine Le Moignan	9	9	9
(England) Linda Charman	0	0	4
(Australia) Vicki Cardwell	9	9	9
(South Africa) Sjeanne Cawdry	0	0	4
4	(England) Suzanne Horner	9	9	9
(Brazil) Karen Redfern	0	0	1
(Guernsey) Lisa Opie	9	9	9
(South Africa) Desiree Edwards	0	0	0
2	(Australia) Liz Irving	8	9	9	9
(Australia) Danielle Drady	10	6	7	0
(England) Rebecca Macree	9	9	9
(United States) Amy Milanek	3	0	2
(England) Sue Wright	9	9	9
(South Africa) Marie Clare	2	3	0
(Scotland) Senga Macfie	10	9	9
(South Africa) Ingrid Schreiber	8	0	3
(Germany) Sabine Schoene	9	10	9
(South Africa) Chantel Clifton-Parks	7	8	8
(South Africa) Claire Nitch	9	9	9
(South Africa) Vivien Hardy	5	2	2
3	(England) Cassie Jackman	9	9	9
(Spain) Natalia Meneu	1	1	4
(Republic of Ireland) Rebecca O'Callaghan (nee Best)	9	9	9
(Spain) Patricia Villa	2	0	4

Second round
1	(Australia) Martin M	9	9	9
(England) Geaves	7	2	3
7	(Australia) Fitzgerald	9	9	9
(England) Martin J	2	3	2
6	(Guernsey) Le Moignan	9	9	9
(Australia) Cardwell	1	5	4
4	(England) Horner	9	9	4	0	9
(Guernsey) Opie	3	2	9	9	7
2	(Australia) Irving	9	9	9
(England) Macree	7	3	5
5	(England) Wright	9	7	7	9	9
(Scotland) Macfie	6	9	9	6	1
(Germany) Schoene	4	9	9	9
8	(South Africa) Nitch	9	3	3	4
3	(England) Jackman	8	9	9	9
(Republic of Ireland) O'Callaghan	10	7	4	0

Quarter-finals
1	(Australia) Martin	9	9	9
7	(Australia) Fitzgerald	7	4	3
6	(Guernsey) Le Moignan	9	9	9	10
4	(England) Horner	8	9	7	8
2	(Australia) Irving	9	9	9
5	(England) Wright	4	1	6
(Germany) Schoene	8	1	9	9	9
3	(England) Jackman	10	9	1	8	6

Semi-finals
1	(Australia) Martin	9	9	9
6	(Guernsey) Le Moignan	4	0	6
Final
1	(Australia) Martin	9	9	9
2	(Australia) Irving	2	2	1
2	(Australia) Irving	9	8	9	9
(Germany) Schoene	5	10	4	7

=== Notes ===
The retirement of Susan Devoy left Michelle Martin as the number one seed for the championships. Martin eased to victory winning the tournament without even dropping a single game.

== See also ==
- World Open
- 1993 Men's World Open Squash Championship

Preceded by Vancouver (Canada); 1992	World Open; South Africa (Johannesburg); 1993	Succeeded by St Peter Port (Guernsey); 1994
