= 1985 Women's World Team Squash Championships =

Squash tournament

Women's World Team 1985
- 4th World Women's Team Championship
- Location: (Republic of Ireland) Dublin, Ireland
- Date: 2 to 7 September 1985

Results
- Champions: England
- Runners-up: New Zealand
- Third place: Australia

The 1985 Women's World Team Squash Championships (sponsored by 7 Up) were held in Dublin, Ireland from 2 to 7 September 1985.

The England team became the champions, defeating New Zealand 2-1.

== First round ==
=== Pool 1 ===
Team One	Team Two	Score
Australia	Canada	3-0
Australia	Zimbabwe	3-0
Canada	Zimbabwe	3-0

Pos	Nation	Team	P	W	L	Pts
1	Australia	Carin Clonda, Jan Miller, Diane Davis, Tracey Smith	2	2	0	4
2	Canada	Joyce Maycock, Diane Edge, Joanne Beckwith, Gail Pimm	2	1	1	2
3	Zimbabwe	S Bromhead, P Brown, W Loades	2	0	2	0

=== Pool 2 ===
Team One	Team Two	Score
England	Wales	3-0
England	Netherlands	3-0
England	Sweden	3-0
Netherlands	Wales	3-0
Netherlands	Sweden	3-0
Sweden	Wales	2-1

Pos	Nation	Team	P	W	L	Pts
1	England	Martine Le Moignan, Lisa Opie, Alison Cumings, Lucy Soutter	3	3	0	6
2	Netherlands	Babette Hoogendoorn, Petra Zeevenhooven, Mariëtte Remijnse, Marjolein Houtsma	3	2	1	4
3	Sweden	Lena Fridén, Karin Due-Boje, Rene Mauritzon Susanne Nyberg	3	1	2	2
4	Wales	E Emmanuel, A Roberts, M Baxter, Sarah Fury	3	0	3	0

=== Pool 3 ===
Team One	Team Two	Score
New Zealand	Scotland	3-0
New Zealand	Finland	3-0
New Zealand	West Germany	3-0
Scotland	Finland	3-0
Scotland	West Germany	3-0
Finland	West Germany	2-1

Pos	Nation	Team	P	W	L	Pts
1	New Zealand	Susan Devoy, Robyn Blackwood, Donna Gurran, Jillian Oakley	3	3	0	6
2	Scotland	Heather Wallace, Alison Cruickshank, Audrey Cumberford, Shirley Brown	3	2	1	4
3	Finland	Tuula Myllyniemi, Katja Sauerwald, Nina Taimiaho, Mia Markkanen	3	1	2	2
4	West Germany	Barbara Hammerschmidt, Beate Müller, Eva Körschgen, I Daniel	3	0	3	0

=== Pool 4 ===
Team One	Team Two	Score
(Republic of Ireland) Ireland	United States	3-0
(Republic of Ireland) Ireland	Hong Kong	3-0
United States	Hong Kong	3-0

Pos	Nation	Team	P	W	L	Pts
1	(Republic of Ireland) Ireland	Mary Byrne, Rebecca Best, Marjorie Burke, Barbara Lowans	2	2	0	4
2	United States	Karen Kelso, Nancy Gengler, Julie-Ann Harris, Nina Porter, Gail Ramsay	2	1	1	2
3	Hong Kong	Dawn Olsen, Julie Hawkes, T Brooke	2	0	2	0

== Second round ==
=== Group A ===
Team One	Team Two	Score
New Zealand	Australia	3-0
New Zealand	Netherlands	2-1
New Zealand	United States	3-0
Australia	Netherlands	3-0
Australia	United States	3-0
United States	Netherlands	2-1

Pos	Nation	P	W	L	Pts
1	New Zealand	3	3	0	6
2	Australia	3	2	1	4
3	United States	3	1	2	2
4	Netherlands	3	0	3	0

=== Group B ===
Team One	Team Two	Score
England	(Republic of Ireland) Ireland	3-0
England	Canada	2-1
England	Scotland	3-0
(Republic of Ireland) Ireland	Canada	2-1
(Republic of Ireland) Ireland	Scotland	2-1
Canada	Scotland	2-1

Pos	Nation	P	W	L	Pts
1	England	3	3	0	6
2	(Republic of Ireland) Ireland	3	2	1	4
3	Canada	3	1	2	2
4	Scotland	3	0	3	0

== Semi finals ==
Team One	Team Two	Score
England	Australia	3-0
New Zealand	(Republic of Ireland) Ireland	3-0

== Third Place Play Off ==
Team One	Team Two	Score
Australia	(Republic of Ireland) Ireland	2-1

== Final ==
England
2
FINAL
Dublin, Ireland
07 September 1985

New Zealand
1

			1	2	3	4	5
1	(England) (New Zealand)	Martine Le Moignan; Susan Devoy	9; 3	1; 9	2; 9	8; 10
2	(England) (New Zealand)	Lucy Soutter; Robyn Blackwood	9; 5	9; 7	9; 2
3	(England) (New Zealand)	Alison Cumings; Donna Gurran	9; 6	9; 4	9; 5

== See also ==
- World Team Squash Championships
- World Squash Federation
- World Open (squash)

Preceded by Australia; 1983	Squash World Team; Ireland; 1985	Succeeded by New Zealand; 1987
