= 1989 Women's World Open Squash Championship =

Women's World Open 1989
- 7th WISPA World Squash Championship
- Location: Warmond, Netherlands
- Date: March 5–19, 1989

WISPA World Tour
- Category: World Open
- Prize money: $40,000

Results
- Champion: (Guernsey) Martine Le Moignan
- Runner-up: (New Zealand) Susan Devoy
- Semi-finalists: (Australia) Liz Irving (Australia) Sarah Fitz-Gerald

The 1989 Women's NCM World Open Squash Championship was the women's edition of the 1989 World Open, which serves as the individual world championship for squash players. The event took place in Warmond in the Netherlands between 5 March and 19 March 1989. Martine Le Moignan won the World Open title, defeating Susan Devoy in the final.

== Seeds ==
1. (New Zealand) Susan Devoy (final)
2. (Guernsey) Lisa Opie (third round)
3. (Guernsey) Martine Le Moignan (champion)
4. (Australia) Liz Irving (semifinals)
5. (Australia) Michelle Martin (quarter-final)
6. (Australia) Robyn Lambourne (quarter-final)
7. (England) Alison Cumings (quarter-final)
8. (England) Lucy Soutter (third round)
9. (Australia) Danielle Drady (quarter-final)
10. (Australia) Robyn Belford (second round)
11. (Netherlands) Babette Hoogendoorn (third round)
12. (New Zealand) Joanne Williams (second round)
13. (England) Fiona Geaves (second round)
14. (Australia) Sharon Bradey (first round)
15. (Australia) Sarah Fitz-Gerald (semifinals)
16. (Republic of Ireland) Rebecca Best (third round)

== Draw and results ==
=== Finals ===
Semi-finals
1	(New Zealand) Devoy	5	10	9	9
4	(Australia) Irving	9	9	6	2
3	(Guernsey) Le Moignan	9	9	0	5	9
15	(Australia) Fitz-Gerald	4	5	9	9	1

Final
1	(New Zealand) Devoy	9	4	8	8
3	(Guernsey) Le Moignan	4	9	10	10

=== Top half ===
First round
1	(New Zealand) Susan Devoy	9	9	9
(Republic of Ireland) Jill McCaughey	1	0	0
(Spain) Lali Valles	9	2	9	9	9
(New Zealand) Fleur Townsend	0	9	10	7	2
16	(Republic of Ireland) Rebecca Best	w/o
(Republic of Ireland) Brona Conway	scr
(West Germany) Andrea Holbe	6	9	9	5	10
(Finland) Nina Taimiaho	9	2	1	5	8
9	(Australia) Danielle Drady	9	9	9
(England) Jeanine Leatherbarrow	0	2	1
(England) Angela Smith	5	9	9	9
(West Germany) Daniela Grzenia	9	4	0	6
8	(England) Lucy Soutter	9	9	4	9
(Australia) Susan Carter	0	6	9	5
(England) Carolyn Mett	7	9	9	9
(England) Ruth Strauss	9	6	0	1
4	(Australia) Liz Irving	9	9	9
(France) Catherine Lebossé	3	5	5
(West Germany) Beate Müller	10	3	9	9
(Netherlands) Hugoline van Hoorn	9	9	2	2
(England) Suzanne Horner	9	9	9
(England) Sue Wright	3	2	1
13	(England) Fiona Geaves	9	9	9
(Netherlands) H Florissen	1	4	2
5	(Australia) Michelle Martin	9	9	9
(Finland) Minna Sinervo	6	0	3
(England) Samantha Langley-Foster	9	10	9
(Australia) Rae Anderson	5	9	4
(Australia) Vicki Cardwell	9	9	9
(Finland) Tuula Myllyniemi	3	0	1
14	(New Zealand) Joanne Williams	9	9	9
(Wales) Tracey Thomas	2	3	4

Second round
1	(New Zealand) Devoy	9	9	9
(Spain) Valles	2	4	5
16	(Republic of Ireland) Best	9	9	10
(West Germany) Holbe	7	4	8
9	(Australia) Drady	9	9	9
(England) Smith	0	2	0
8	(England) Soutter	9	9	9
(England) Mett	1	6	1
4	(Australia) Irving	9	9	9
(West Germany) Mueller	0	2	4
(England) Horner	5	9	9	9
13	(England) Geaves	9	6	2	4
5	(Australia) Martin	9	9	9
(England) Langley-Foster	3	1	1
(Australia) Cardwell	1	2	1
12	(New Zealand) Williams	9	9	9

Third round
1	(New Zealand) Devoy	9	9	9	9
16	(Republic of Ireland) Best	10	3	2	2
9	(Australia) Drady	6	10	9	9
8	(England) Soutter	9	9	1	5
4	(Australia) Irving	8	9	9	9	9
(England) Horner	10	10	5	5	2
5	(Australia) Martin	5	9	9	9
(Australia) Cardwell	9	6	6	1

Quarter-finals
1	(New Zealand) Devoy	10	6	9	9
9	(Australia) Drady	8	9	1	7
Semi-finals
1	(New Zealand) Devoy	5	10	9	9
4	(Australia) Irving	9	9	6	2
4	(Australia) Irving	9	9	10
5	(Australia) Martin	7	5	8

=== Bottom half ===
First round
3	(Guernsey) Martine Le Moignan	9	9	9
(Hong Kong) Julie Hawkes	1	3	2
(Netherlands) Nicole Beumer	9	9	7	9
(Republic of Ireland) Caroline Collins	6	6	9	7
(New Zealand) Donna Newton	9	9	9
(Canada) Amanda Paton	5	2	2
14	(Australia) Sharon Bradey	scr
(New Zealand) A Hui	w/o
6	(Australia) Robyn Lambourne	9	9	9
(England) Helen Macfie	0	1	1
(Wales) Sarah Fury	10	3	5	9	10
(England) Melanie Warren-Hawkes	8	9	9	1	8
11	(Netherlands) Babette Hoogendoorn	9	9	9
(New Zealand) Annette Owen	1	3	0
(West Germany) Sabine Schöne	6	9
(Canada) Heather Wallace	9	5	ret
15	(Australia) Sarah Fitz-Gerald	9	9	9
(New Zealand) Gillian Oakley	0	0	3
(England) Donna Vardy	9	9	9
(Sweden) Camilla Dora	1	0	1
2	(England) Lisa Opie	9	9	9
(Israel) Claire Levine	0	1	5
(Scotland) Shirley Brown	9	9	5	9	9
(France) Corinne Castets	4	10	9	5	1
7	(England) Alison Cumings	9	9	9
(Canada) Shelley Harvey	1	0	2
(Netherlands) Marjolein Houtsma	9	9	7	9
(France) Sabine Amigorena	1	7	9	7
(England) Liz Brown	9	9	7	9
(England) Flavia Roberts	4	2	9	5
10	(Australia) Robyn Belford	9	9	9
(England) Rebecca Macree	4	5	6

Second round
3	(Guernsey) Le Moignan	9	9	9
(Netherlands) Beumer	1	1	2
(New Zealand) Newton	9	9	9
(New Zealand) Hui	0	1	3
6	(Australia) Lambourne	9	9	9
(Wales) Fury	3	1	2
11	(Netherlands) Hoogendoorn	9	9	9
(West Germany) Schoene	7	5	2
15	(Australia) Fitz-Gerald	9	9	9
(England) Vardy	2	2	5
2	(England) Opie	9	9	9
(Scotland) Brown	1	4	0
7	(England) Cumings	9	9	9
(Netherlands) Houtsma	3	3	0
(England) Brown	9	9	10
10	(Australia) Belford	2	4	8

Third round
3	(Guernsey) Le Moignan	9	9	9
(Australia) Newton	4	0	0
6	(Australia) Lambourne	7	9	9	5	9
11	(Netherlands) Hoogendoorn	9	4	1	9	5
15	(Australia) Fitz-Gerald	9	9	7	0	9
2	(England) Opie	6	5	9	9	6
7	(England) Cumings	9	9	9
(England) Brown	0	5	6

Quarter-finals
3	(Guernsey) Le Moignan	9	9	9
6	(Australia) Lambourne	7	2	2
Semi-finals
3	(Guernsey) Le Moignan	9	9	0	5	9
15	(Australia) Fitz-Gerald	4	5	9	9	1
15	(Australia) Fitz-Gerald	6	9	9	3	10
7	(England) Cumings	9	7	1	9	8

=== Notes ===
World number one Susan Devoy suffered a rare defeat at the hands of Martine Le Moignan in the final.
Robyn Lambourne was formerly Robyn Friday.
Liz Irving defeated Sarah Fitz-Gerald 9-5 9-2 9–1 in the third place play off.

Preceded by Auckland (New Zealand); 1987	World Open; Netherlands (Warmond); 1989	Succeeded by Sydney (Australia); 1990
