= 1983 Women's World Open Squash Championship =

Women's World Open 1983
- 4th Women's World Squash Championship
- Location: Perth, Australia
- Date: 23–28 October 1983
- Category: World Open

Results
- Champion: (Australia) Vicki Cardwell
- Runner-up: (Australia) Rhonda Thorne
- Semi-finalists: (New Zealand) Susan Devoy (Australia) Carin Clonda

The 1983 Town and Country Building Society Women's World Open Squash Championship was the women's edition of the 1983 World Open, which serves as the individual world championship for squash players.

The event took place in Perth in Australia, from 23–28 October 1983. Vicki Cardwell won the World Open title, defeating Rhonda Thorne in the final.

== Seeds ==
1. (Australia) Vicki Cardwell (champion)
2. (Australia) Rhonda Thorne (final)
3. (New Zealand) Susan Devoy (semifinals)
4. (Guernsey) Martine Le Moignan (quarterfinals)
5. (England) Sue Cogswell (second round)
6. (Guernsey) Lisa Opie (quarterfinals)
7. (Australia) Carin Clonda (semifinals)
8. (England) Angela Smith (quarterfinals)

== First round ==
Player One	Player Two	Score
(Australia) Vicki Cardwell (1)	(Scotland) Anne Smith	9-6 9-5 9-0
(Australia) Rhonda Thorne (2)	(Australia) Sue Stevens	9-1 9-0 9-4
(New Zealand) Susan Devoy (3)	(Australia) K. Alexander	9-2 9-3 9-4
(Guernsey) Martine Le Moignan (4)	(Australia) J. Ker	9-2 9-1 9-0
(England) Sue Cogswell (5)	(Scotland) Joyce Leach	9-4 9-0 9-0
(Guernsey) Lisa Opie (6)	(South Africa) Cyndy Robards	9-10 9-2 9-3 9-1
(Australia) Carin Clonda (7)	(England) Jean Reynolds	9-0 9-3 9-1
(England) Angela Smith (8)	(United States) Gail Ramsay	9-2 9-0 9-2
(England) Barbara Diggens (10)	(Scotland) Shirley Brown	9-4 9-1 9-2
(Australia) Jan Miller (12)	(Republic of Ireland) Mary Byrne	9-2 8-10 9-1 9-2
(Scotland) Heather Wallace	(United States) M Hulbert	9-5 9-0 9-2
(South Africa) Renee Aucamp	(Republic of Ireland) Rebecca Best	9-7 9-1 9-2
(South Africa) Gillian Winckler	(Australia) Cath Bellemore	9-4 9-7 1-9 6-9 9-5
(Australia) Diane Davis	(Scotland) Alison Cruickshank	9-4 9-1 9-0
(England) Ruth Strauss	(New Zealand) Donna Gurran	9-3 9-2 9-3
(New Zealand) Robyn Blackwood	(South Africa) Donna Caldwell	9-6 9-7 9-2
(Republic of Ireland) Marjorie Burke	(South Africa) Denise Holton	9-1 9-2 10-8
(Wales) Deanna Murray	(New Zealand) Tracey Mandel	9-0 9-4 9-5
(United States) Alicia McConnell	(Wales) Debbie Turnbull	9-5 9-4 8-9 9-6
(Australia) Michelle Toon	(United States) Carol Weymuller	9-2 9-1 9-4
(Australia) Barbara Oldfield	(New Zealand) Sue Wasley	9-0 9-2 9-0
(Australia) Robyn Friday	(Wales) Sian Washer	9-0 9-5 9-0
(Australia) Liz Irving	(New Zealand) Joanne Williams	9-2 3-9 9-7 9-7
(Sweden) Agneta Samuelsson	(England) Lucy Soutter	9-3 9-0 9-0
(Australia) Debbie Matjeles		
(Australia) Susan Carter		
(Australia) Helen Paradeiser		
(Australia) Robyn Belford		
(Australia) Rae Anderson		
(Australia) Carol Kennewell		

== Second round to final ==
Second round
1	(Australia) Vicki Cardwell	9	9	9
(Australia) Barbara Oldfield	2	0	4
(South Africa) Renee Aucamp	9	9	9
(South Africa) Gillian Winckler	0	4	3
8	(England) Angela Smith	9	9	9
(Australia) Susan Carter	3	4	5
(Australia) Debbie Matjeles	9	9	10
10	(England) Barbara Diggens	7	6	8
3	(New Zealand) Susan Devoy	9	9	9
(Australia) Robyn Belford	5	0	0
(England) Ruth Strauss
(Scotland) Heather Wallace	9	9	10
5	(England) Sue Cogswell	0	5	9
(Australia) Jan Miller
2	(Australia) Rhonda Thorne
(Australia) Rae Anderson
6	(Guernsey) Lisa Opie
(Australia) Carol Kennewell
7	(Australia) Carin Clonda
(New Zealand) Robyn Blackwood	2	9	9	9
(Australia) Michelle Toon	9	7	4	4
4	(Guernsey) Martine Le Moignan	9	9	9
(Australia) Helen Paradeiser	2	2	2
(Australia) Diane Davis

Third round
1	(Australia) Cardwell	9	9	9
(South Africa) Aucamp	1	3	3
8	(England) Smith	3	9	9	9
(Australia) Matjeles	9	0	5	3
3	(New Zealand) Devoy	0	9	9	9
(England) Strauss	9	1	6	1
(Scotland) Wallace	9	9	9
(Australia) Miller	6	0	4
2	(Australia) Thorne	10	6	9	9
(Australia) Anderson	8	9	2	0
6	(Guernsey) Opie	9	9	9
(Australia) Kennewell	0	4	1
7	(Australia) Clonda	9	9	10
(New Zealand) Blackwood	1	6	9
4	(Guernsey) Le Moignan	9	9	9
(Australia) Davis	4	3	3

Quarter-finals
1	(Australia) Cardwell	9	9	9
8	(England) Smith	6	5	4
3	(New Zealand) Devoy	7	9	9	9
(Scotland) Wallace	9	3	4	7
2	(Australia) Thorne	9	9	9	3	10
6	(Guernsey) Opie	7	6	10	9	9
7	(Australia) Clonda	9	9	5	9
4	(Guernsey) Le Moignan	3	7	9	4

Semi-finals
1	(Australia) Cardwell	9	9	9
3	(New Zealand) Devoy	2	5	4
Final
1	(Australia) Cardwell	9	9	9
2	(Australia) Thorne	1	3	4
2	(Australia) Thorne	6	9	9	9
7	(Australia) Clonda	9	1	1	2

== See also ==
- World Open
- 1983 Men's World Open Squash Championship

=== Notes ===
Vicki Cardwell who had served a two-year team ban in her native Australia duly answered her critics by winning the World Open. The Australian then duly retired. Susan Devoy won a third place play off after defeating Carin Clonda 3 games to 1.

Preceded by Toronto (Canada); 1981	World Open; Australia (Perth); 1983	Succeeded by Dublin (Ireland); 1985
