= Zara DuPont =

American suffragist

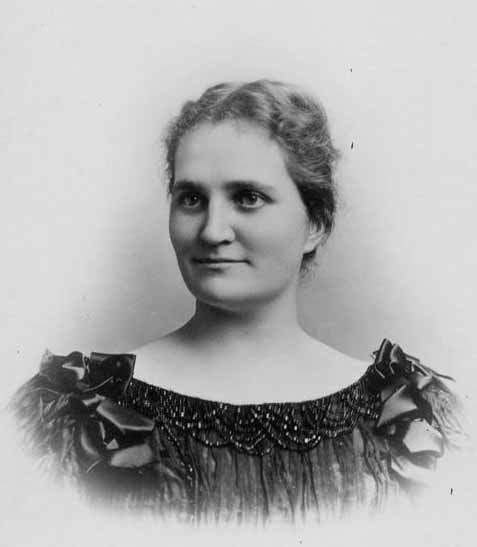
- Born: February 24, 1869; Louisville, Kentucky
- Died: May 13, 1946 (aged 77); Cambridge, Massachusetts
- Occupation: Suffragist

Zara "Zadie" DuPont (1869–1946) was an American suffragist, serving as the first Vice President of the Ohio Woman Suffrage Association.

== Life ==
DuPont was born on February 24, 1869, in Louisville, Kentucky. As a young woman she joined the board of the Children's Free Hospital in Louisville.

She moved to Ohio where she became active in the suffrage movement there. In 1910 she worked unsuccessfully to include women's suffrage in the reformed constitution of Ohio. In 1911 she joined the Cuyahoga Woman's Suffrage Association, going on the serve as the first Vice President of the Ohio Woman Suffrage Association. She worked with Florence E. Allen on Maud Wood Park's organizing tour of Ohio.

DuPont was also a civil rights and trade activist, specifically as a pro-labor shareholder activist at Bethlehem Steel and Montgomery Ward.

DuPont died in Cambridge, Massachusetts, on May 13, 1946.

== Personal ==
Zara DuPont was a member of the Du Pont family. Notable close relatives included her brother T. Coleman du Pont and niece Ethel du Pont.

== See also ==
- List of Ohio suffragists
- Women's suffrage in Ohio
