= Viola D. Romans =

American politician

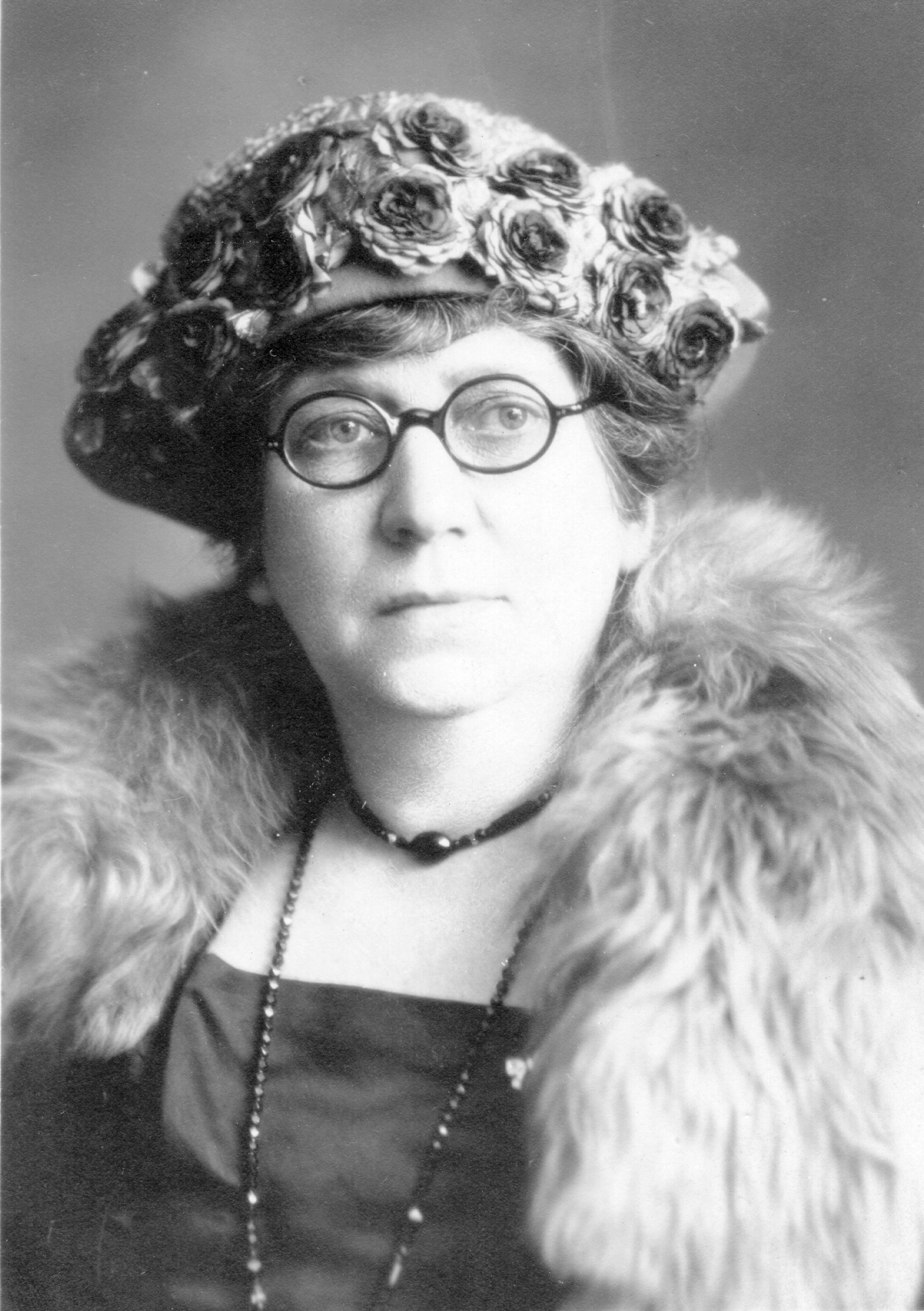

Member of the Ohio House of Representatives
- In office 1925-1928

Personal details
- Born: Laura Viola Doudna; April 30, 1863 Spencer Station, Ohio
- Died: June 29, 1946 (aged 83) Columbus, Ohio
- Party: Republican

Viola Doudna Romans (April 30, 1863 - June 29, 1946) was an American lecturer and politician, chiefly known for her role in the temperance movement. She was the first woman elected to serve as Franklin County's Representative to the Ohio House of Representatives.

== Early life ==
Laura Viola Doudna was born in Spencer Station, Ohio on April 30, 1863 to Quaker parents Rachel Lancaster Benson Doudna and Jesse Doudna.

== Education and teaching career ==
She began her elementary education at the village school in Spencer Station, later attending the Friends Boarding School (now Olney Friends School) at Barnesville, in Belmont County, Ohio. Upon completing her education in Barnesville, she moved to Delaware, Ohio, where she became a teacher at the Commercial School. After her marriage to Dr. Romans, she pursued higher education for herself. Romans attended Columbus Business College's Department of Elocution short course in the Science and Art of Elocution and earned her Certificate of Graduation on September 16, 1887.

After graduating from Columbus Business College, Romans held various teaching positions throughout the state. She taught for a brief period at Cincinnati Wesleyan College before returning to Muskingum County to attend Muskingum College (now Muskingum University) in New Concord, Ohio, where she received her Bachelor's degree in elocution. She became faculty of the college's department of Elocution and Physical Culture in 1892, serving as head of the department for five years. During her second run for Senate, Romans was awarded the honorary degree of Doctor of Literature by the President of Muskingum College, the first woman so honored by the institution.

== Political activism ==
=== Temperance ===
Romans' political activism began with her involvement in the Woman's Christian Temperance Union (WCTU). She credited her introduction to the organization to her friendship with Martha McClellan Brown, founder of the National Woman's Christian Temperance Union and vice president of Cincinnati Wesleyan College, where Romans was a teacher of oratory at the time. By 1897, Romans had sought and successfully obtained the role of assistant recording secretary for the Ohio WCTU, the first of many positions she would hold during her tenure with the organization. Known for her proficiency in public speaking, Romans used her background in oratory to deliver persuasive speeches as a national lecturer for the WCTU. She not only spoke for the temperance cause, but as a national lecturer, she also argued for female suffrage, which she viewed as the best means to secure legislation against liquor.

=== 1920 Senate run ===
In 1920, Romans, by then vice president of the Ohio WCTU, became the Prohibition Party nominee for United States senator. The Prohibition Party believed that she would get a favorable vote as the WCTU had an estimated 45,000 members in Ohio at the time, but her run for office was ultimately unsuccessful.

=== Ohio House of Representatives ===
==== 86th General Assembly ====
Romans again ran for office, this time as a Republican candidate for state representative. In 1924, four years after her first unsuccessful Senate run, she was nominated and elected to a seat in the Ohio House of Representatives, the first woman elected to represent Franklin County in the state legislature. When asked what pledges she had made during her campaign for office, Romans replied, "The only pledge I made was to endeavor to study impartially all questions as they came to us and as nearly as possible to render my decisions for the common good of all my constituents."

Throughout her tenure in the legislature, Romans used her office to advocate for the welfare of women and children. During the regular session of the 86th General Assembly, she introduced House Bill No. 358, which established educational and vocational training for women confined in the Ohio Reformatory for Women and obtained an appropriation of $100,000 to erect two new buildings—a 150-bed dormitory and an assembly hall—as well as $30,000 to put H.B. No. 358 into effect. Governor Donahey signed the bill into law on April 10, 1925.

==== 87th General Assembly ====
Romans won a second term in office in 1926, reelected by a greater majority in both the primaries and general election than she had been in her first election. During her second term, she introduced House Bill No. 210, known later as The Romans Law. It was the first comprehensive legislation for the permanent preservation of the archives of the State of Ohio. Until that point, there were no provisions in the laws of the State for the safekeeping or retention of records; The Romans Law, enacted in 1927, authorized the transfer of documents and historical papers from agencies of the state government to the Ohio State Archaeological and Historical Society (now the Ohio History Connection).

=== 1930 Senate Run ===
Ten years after her first run for senate, Romans ran for state senator against fellow Franklin County representative William C. Wendt and incumbent Paul M. Herbert, who was running for reelection to his third term. It was again an unsuccessful run for senatorship, with Romans coming in third for the Republican nomination.

== Personal life ==
In 1885, she married Dr. Clarence D. Romans in Muskingum County, Ohio. They had one child, a daughter named Blanche.

== Later life ==
Following her career in the Ohio House of Representatives, Romans continued her involvement in social reform and remained active in administrative and legislative work with the Woman's Christian Temperance Union. After twenty years of serving as vice president of the Ohio WCTU, she succeeded Florence D. Richard as state president in 1932. Two years later, she was chosen as the delegate to the WCTU world convention and traveled to Stockholm, Sweden, where she delivered an address at the conference. Romans continued to serve as president of the Ohio WCTU for six years before suffering a cerebral hemorrhage, which forced her retirement. She remained an honorary president until her death in 1946.

== Death and legacy ==
Romans died at the age of 83 on June 29, 1946, at the home of her daughter, Blanche McVey. She was interred beside her husband, Clarence, in the mausoleum at Northwood Cemetery in Cambridge, Ohio.
