= Stanton Coit =

American-British social activist (1857-1944)

Stanton George Coit
- Born: Stanton George Coit; 11 August 1857; Columbus, Ohio, U.S.
- Died: 15 February 1944 (aged 86); Birling Gap, Sussex, England
- Education: Amherst College
- Spouse: Fanny Adela Wetzlar (m. 1898; died 1932)
- Children: 3
- Mother: Elizabeth Greer Coit

Stanton George Coit (11 August 1857 – 15 February 1944) was an American-born leader of the Ethical movement in England. He became a British citizen in 1903.

== Biography ==
Stanton Coit was born in Columbus, Ohio, on 11 August 1857. He studied at Amherst College where he "fell under the spell of Emerson", at Columbia University, and at the Humboldt University of Berlin, where he studied under Georg von Gizycki and took the degree of Dr. phil. in 1885.

Coit was an aide to Felix Adler in the Society for Ethical Culture which Adler founded in 1876, and it was Adler's suggestion that he study for a doctorate.

In 1886, he founded the Neighborhood Guild, a settlement house in New York City's Lower East Side which is now known as the University Settlement House, following three months spent at Toynbee Hall, which gave him the idea.

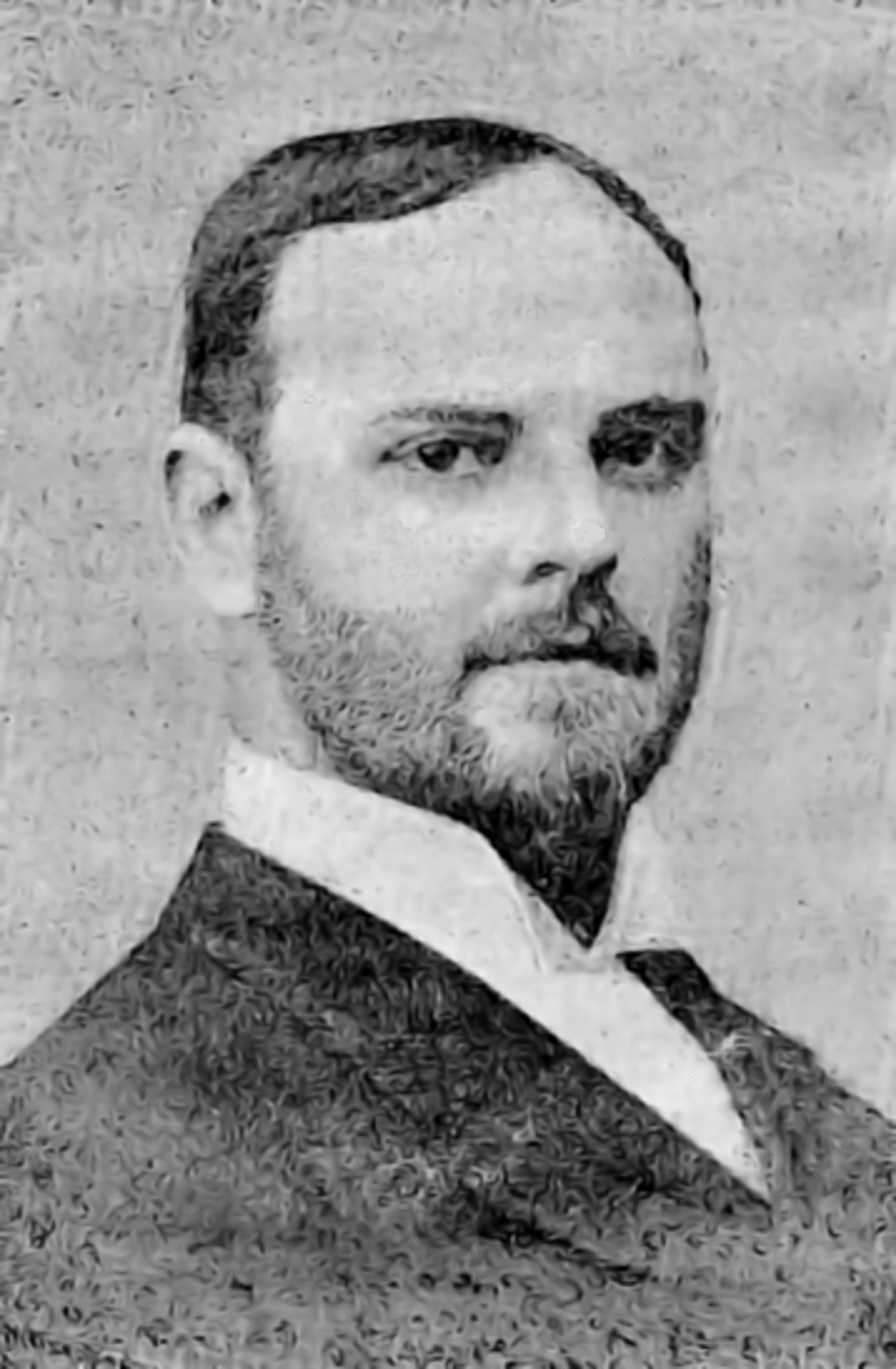
Stanton Coit

In 1888, he went to London as minister of the South Place Religious Society, and during his ministry it was renamed the South Place Ethical Society (SPES) at his insistence. He settled in the United Kingdom, later taking British citizenship.

In 1896, he founded the Union of Ethical Societies, later the Ethical Union, later British Humanist Association, now known as Humanists UK.

In 1898, Coit married Fanny Adela Wetzlar, daughter of a German industrialist Fritz von Gans, who predeceased him in 1932. It was Adela's money which purchased the former Methodist Chapel in Queen's Road. They had three daughters (Adela, Gwendolen and Virginia, his wife had three children from her previous marriage: Richard, Margaret and Elizabeth,). Virginia assisted her father at the Ethical Church.

He was editor of the International Journal of Ethics in 1893-1905, and compiled The Message of Man: A Book of Ethical Scriptures (1894), an Ethical Hymn Book (1905), Responsive Services (1911), and Social Worship (1913), and wrote translations of Georg von Gizycki's works on ethics. In 1906 and 1910, he unsuccessfully stood for Parliament as the Independent Labour Party candidate in Wakefield.

In his thinking, Coit was influenced by Ralph Waldo Emerson and by Émile Durkheim, whose The elementary forms of the religious life Coit read late in his life in 1923. He also translated all three volumes of Nicolai Hartmann's Ethik in 1926.

In 1908, he was sentenced to one month's imprisonment for the indecent assault of a male bus conductor in Kensington which was later quashed on appeal.

As an American living in the United Kingdom, Coit regularly travelled between the United States and Great Britain and he was a passenger on the Carpathia in 1912 when it picked up survivors from the Titanic.

Coit retired as leader of the Ethical Movement in 1935 to be succeeded by Harold Blackham, who dismantled the "churchy" elements, paving the way for the later establishment of the British Humanist Association by Blackham and Julian Huxley.

Coit later lived near Eastbourne, Sussex. He died on 15 February 1944 at his home in Birling Gap near Eastbourne.

== The West London Ethical Society and the Ethical Church ==
Stanton Coit on holiday. Image courtesy of Bishopsgate Library.

In 1891, Coit resigned from the SPES, taking his followers with him. He then founded and became president of the West London Ethical Society. Coit began a journal, The Ethical World, and purchased a former Methodist Chapel with his wife's money, to establish the Queen's Road (Bayswater) Ethical Church where he often preached. The freehold was later purchased with the help of a legacy in 1921. Coit's view was that "Ethical Churches" should replace existing churches founded on the basis of religious belief, and that the Church of England could be turned into such a church. The West London Ethical Society formally changed its name to the Ethical Church in 1914. By 1918, the membership had fallen to 300.

Coit advocated for humanists to use what he called "theological terms in a humanistic sense" and so redefine words like "church", "sermon", "minister", "worship", and "service" for humanist purposes. The thinking was this presentation made the Ethical movement more palatable and acceptable for cultural Christians to break with Christianity. But the effectiveness of this approach, while arguably successfully deployed for the late Victorian age, proved less suited to a more confident and outspoken generation of atheists and agnostics in the first half of the 20th century. His efforts were all reversed by his successors, both at the Ethical Church (which returned to being the West London Ethical Society) and the national Ethical Union (which reformed as the British Humanist Association).

Following Adela's death, Coit advertised for a successor at the Ethical Church, and Harry Snell, Harold Blackham and Coit's daughter, Virginia, were appointed as ministers in 1933.

In 1953, the Ethical Church building was sold to the Catholic Church and the proceeds were used to purchase 13 Prince of Wales Terrace in west London which became Stanton Coit House. The Ethical Church's name reverted to the West London Ethical Society and rejoined the Ethical Union. Many years later, what had been Coit's Ethical Church was sold again to director Richard Curtis and became famous as the blue door seen in the film Notting Hill.

== Publications ==
- Ethical democracy: essays in social dynamics by Professor D.G. Ritchie et al., including Stanton Coit. Edited for the Society of Ethical Propagandists by Stanton Coit (1857)
- Ethical culture as a religion for the people: two discourses delivered in South Place Chapel (1887)
- Ethical Songs with Music compiled and edited by Stanton Coit and Gustav Spiller (1892)
- Ethical Songs compiled and edited for the Union of Ethical Societies by Stanton Coit and Gustav Spiller (1898)
- The Ethical World (journal) edited by Stanton Coit and J. A. Hobson (1899)
- Ethical Hymn Book compiled and edited for the Union of Ethical Societies by Stanton Coit and Gustav Spiller (1905)
- Introduction to Addresses and essays by Ralph Waldo Emerson (1907)
- National Idealism and a State Church (1907)
- National Idealism and the Book of Common Prayer (1908)
- Woman in Church and State (1910)
- The Ethical Movement: its principles and aims by Horace J. Bridges, Stanton Coit, G. E. O'Dell, and Harry Snell. Edited by H. J. Bridges & Stanton Coit (1911)
- The Soul of America (1913)
- Ethics by Nicolai Hartmann, translated by Stanton Coit (1932)
- Ethical Mysticism ... Reprinted from "Aspects of Ethical Religion," essays in honor of Felix Adler, etc.
