= Helen Paradeiser =

Australian squash player

Personal information
- Born: unknown

Sport
- Country: Australia

women's singles

Helen Paradeiser is an Australian former professional squash player. Her sister Sonia Paradeiser was also a squash player who played in domestic level matches.

== Career ==
She emerged as runner-up in the women's individual event at the 1983 World Junior Squash Championships. Paradeiser lost to fellow Australian counterpart Robyn Lambourne in the women's singles final (10–8, 9–2, 9–3), her career best performance in international level and also became the first Australian to lose the women's junior world title final as it was an all-Australian clash.

She also competed at the 1983 Women's World Open Squash Championship where she was knocked out of the second round.
