= Belle Coit Kelton =

American suffragist

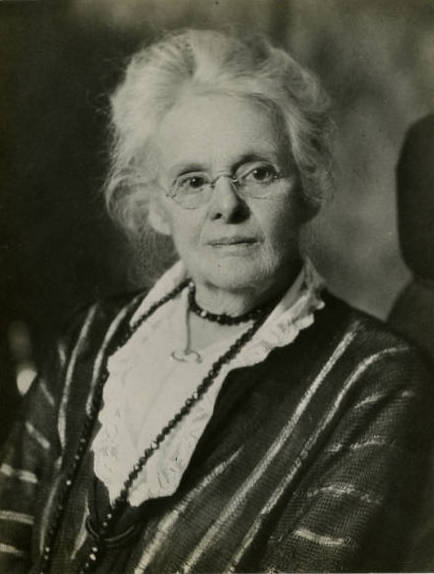
- Kelton in 1925
- Born: Isabella Morrow Coit; 26 November 1855; Columbus, Ohio
- Died: 24 November 1956 (aged 100); Columbus, Ohio
- Monuments: Kelton House Museum and Garden
- Education: Ohio State University
- Occupation: Suffragist
- Organization(s): League of Women Voters, Daughters of the American Revolution, Columbus Woman Suffrage Association, Columbus Equal Suffrage League
- Movement: Suffrage, settlement movement
- Spouse: Frank Clarence Kelton
- Children: Virginia (1884–1884); Elizabeth (1885–1966); Franklin (1887–1903); Stanton (1889–1956); Edwin; (1891–1976)
- Mother: Elizabeth Greer Coit

Isabella Morrow Coit Kelton (26 November 1855 – 24 November 1956) was an American suffragist and one of the first four women admitted to Ohio State University. She was the daughter of prominent Ohio suffragist Elizabeth Greer Coit, and a close friend of Elizabeth Cady Stanton.

== Life ==
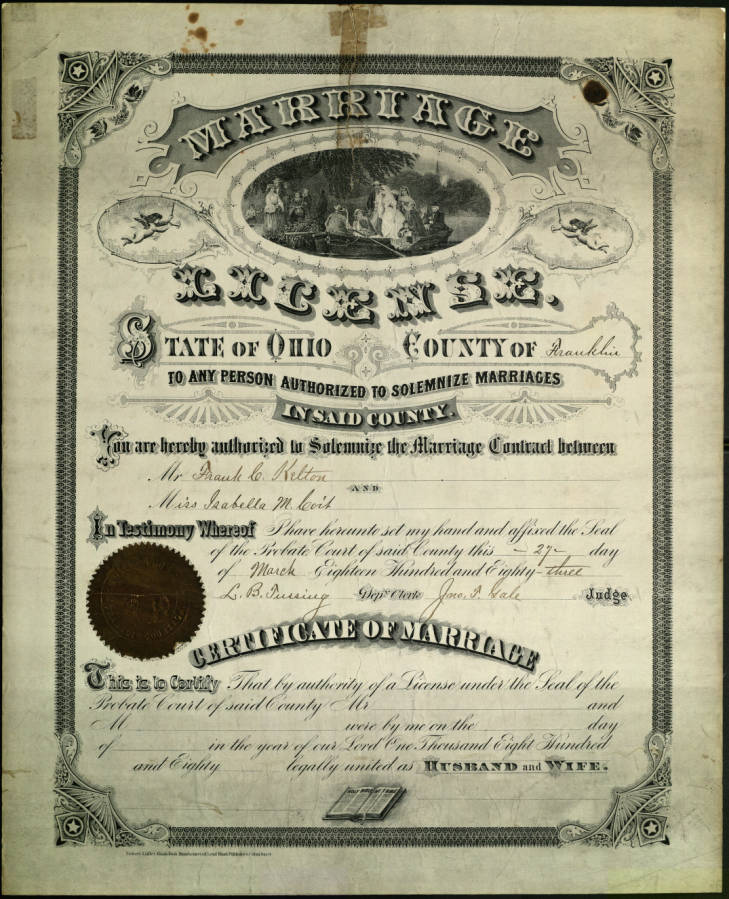
Marriage license for Frank C. Kelton and Isabella Morrow Coit, Franklin County, Ohio, 27 March 1883

Isabella Morrow Coit was born on 26 November 1855 in Columbus, Ohio, the daughter of Harvey Coit Jr. and Elizabeth Greer. Elizabeth Greer was an active suffragist, and the first President of the Columbus Woman Suffrage Association, and Isabella (Belle) followed her mother's example. Belle was one of the first four women admitted to Ohio State University, following a court battle establishing the right to do so. Belle had met with opposition when, in 1874, she tried to enrol at the Ohio Agricultural and Mechanical College (which became OSU), and was informed by President Edward Orton that women were not admitted. She argued that women also were part of the 'Youth of the Land', and so were included in the terms of the Morrill Act, which established Land Grant Colleges. As a result, women were permitted to attend the university.

Belle married Frank Clarence Kelton on 28 March 1883, and the couple had five children, all of whom were born in Columbus: Virginia, Elizabeth, Franklin, Stanton, and Edwin. Initially, they lived at 586 East Town Street (today the Kelton House Museum and Garden), but later swapped homes with Frank's elder brother, moving to Monroe Street. Kelton House was built in 1852 by Fernando Cortez Kelton and Sophia Langdon Stone, abolitionists who used it as a stop on the Underground Railroad.

== Activism ==
Belle Coit Kelton actively supported the Godman Guild Settlement House, the Woman's Christian Temperance Union, the Ohio Woman Suffrage Association, the Daughters of the American Revolution, and the League of Women Voters. For this latter, Belle was one of the organisers of the Franklin County League of Women Voters, its President for two years, and later its Honorary President. She was also an early officer of the Columbus Equal Suffrage League, established in 1907. For her prominent role in the suffrage movement, Belle Coit Kelton was included on the Ohio State Honor Role, produced by the League. She was listed as 'an early pioneer in suffrage movements and president of the Franklin County Suffrage Association'. A bronze plaque in the Ohio Statehouse commemorates her services and those of her mother to the state of Ohio.

In 1914, Belle was involved in gathering voting-eligible signatories around Franklin County for a petition calling for women's suffrage. Between February – July 1914, more than 150 petition workers gathered 9,187 signatures, representing over 10 percent of the county's registered voters.

== Later years ==
Belle Coit Kelton lived to be a centenarian, and was presented on her 100th birthday with 101 roses, by a representative of the Equitable Life Assurance Society of the U.S. She was one of the oldest owners of an Equitable annuity policy. Belle died on 23 November 1956, two days shy of her 101st birthday.
