= Spencer Station, Ohio =

Unincorporated community in Ohio, U.S.

Coordinates: 39°57′45″N 81°16′19″W

Spencer Station is an unincorporated community in Millwood Township, Guernsey County, in the U.S. state of Ohio.

== History ==
Spencer Station was platted in 1892 when the railroad was extended to that point.
