= Rosa L. Segur =

American suffragist

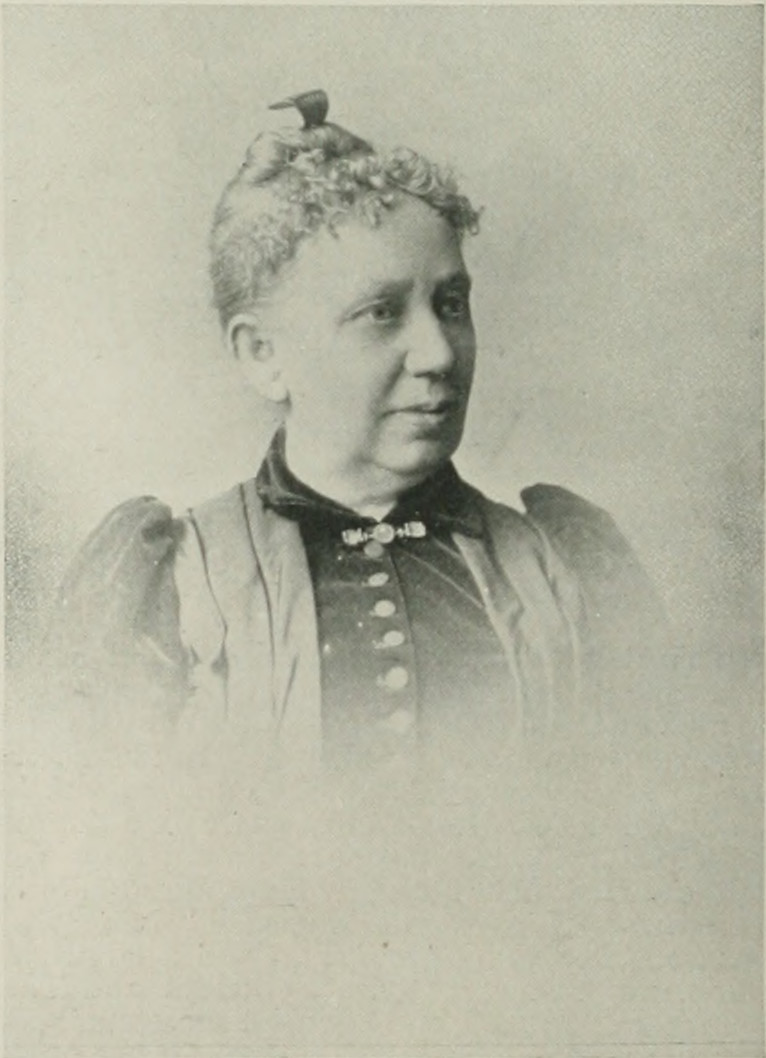
- Rosa L. Segur, from a 1908 publication
- Born: Rosa L. Klinge; January 30, 1833; Hesse, Germany
- Died: December 26, 1906 (aged 73); Dallas, Texas
- Occupations: Writer, Suffragist
- Spouse: Daniel Segur (m. 1851; died in 1876)

Rosa L. Klinge Segur (January 30, 1833 – December 26, 1906) was a German-born American writer and suffragist, leader of the Toledo Woman Suffrage Association.

== Early life ==
Rosa L. Klinge was born at Hesse, in Germany, the daughter of Edward Klinge and Jeannetta Freilach Klinge. When Segur was five years old, her family moved to the United States in 1838 with her parents, and settled in Toledo, Ohio in 1840. From an early age, Segur was passionate about studies.

== Career ==
Segur wrote a women's column for the Toledo Blade newspaper. She also wrote articles about women for Locke's National Monthly in the 1873.

Segur was a leader in the Toledo Woman Suffrage Association from its founding in 1869. "The dominant figure in the Toledo Association for nearly two score years was Mrs. Rosa L. Segur," recalled a 1908 article, "a woman who would unflinchingly have faced the cannon's mouth for her cause." She lobbied the state government for changes in laws about widows' and married women's property rights. She also worked for the hiring of police matrons in Ohio cities, and women physicians in state-run institutions. In 1905 she wrote A History of Woman Suffrage in the Maumee Valley, her memoir of activism.

== Personal life ==
Rosa L. Klinge married Daniel Segur in 1851, as his second wife. They had two children, Daniel (1859–1917) and Fannie (1856–1930). Rosa was widowed when Daniel died by suicide in 1876. Rosa L. Segur died in Dallas, Texas in 1906, aged 73 years. The Segur Family Papers are archived in the Local History program of the Toledo-Lucas County Public Library.
