= Mary Edith Campbell =

American suffragist and social economist

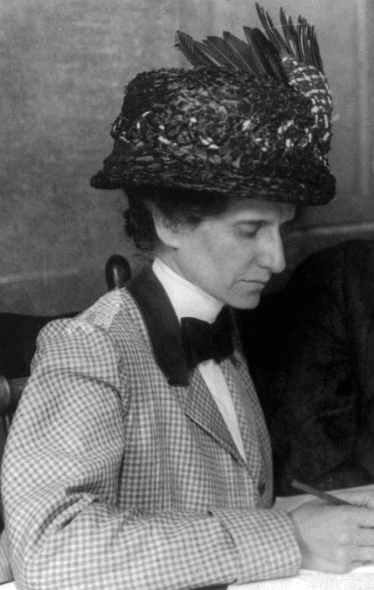
- Born: 1876
- Died: 1962 (aged 85–86)
- Occupations: Politician, Activist

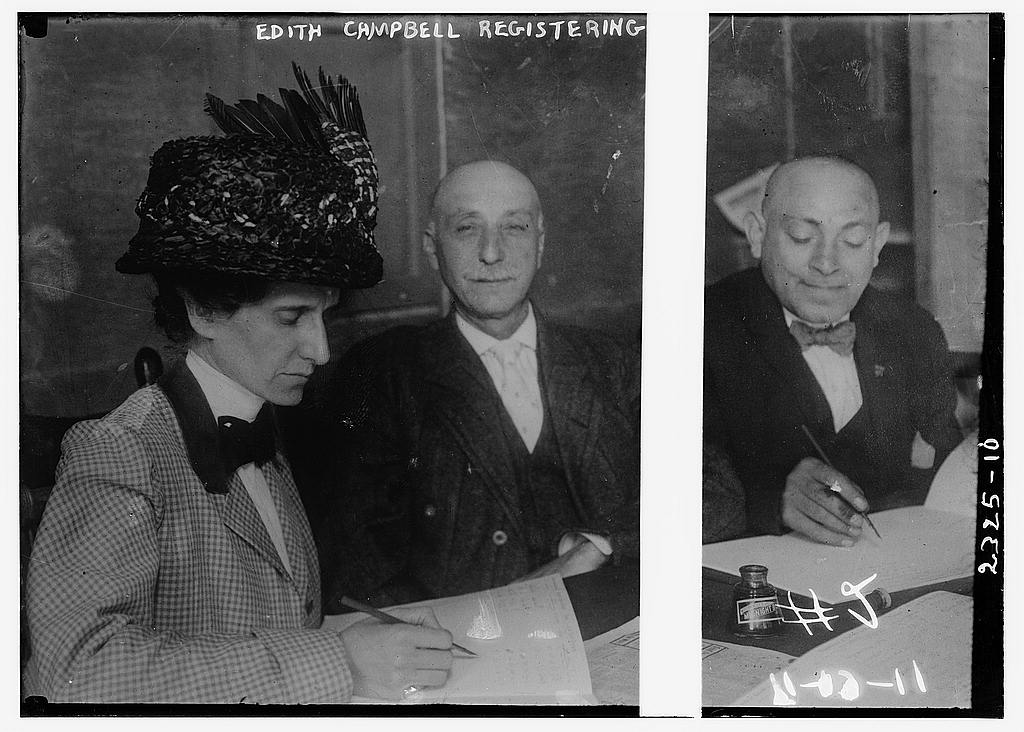
Campbell in 1910

Mary Edith Campbell sometimes known as Edith Campbell, was an American suffragist and social economist.

== Biography ==
Campbell was born on December 27, 1875 or 1876. In 1911 she was the first woman elected to the Board of Education in Cincinnati, Ohio with an endorsement from U.S. President William Howard Taft. In 1931 she was given an honorary degree.

Campbell was the first president of the Woman's City Club of Greater Cincinnati, She was a member of the Juvenile Protective Association and the Cincinnati League of Women Voters.

Campbell died in 1962, leaving her estate to Planned Parenthood of Cincinnati

== See also ==
- Women's suffrage in the United States
