= Elizabeth Greer Coit =

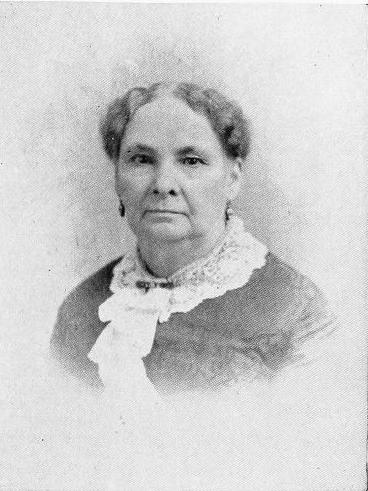
- Born: Elizabeth Greer; 10 January 1820; Worthington, Ohio
- Died: 29 May 1901 (aged 81); Columbus, Ohio
- Occupation(s): Suffragist, humanitarian, teacher
- Organization(s): Columbus Equal Rights Association (founder and first President); Ohio Woman Suffrage Association; Soldiers' Aid Society
- Spouse: Harvey Coit (m. 1844)
- Children: Belle Coit Kelton, Stanton Coit, Alonzo B. Coit

Elizabeth Greer Coit (January 10, 1820 – May 29, 1901) was a prominent Ohio suffragist and humanitarian, who founded Columbus' first women's suffrage organization and was its inaugural President.

== Early life ==
Elizabeth Greer was born in Worthington, Ohio on January 10, 1820, the fourth daughter of Belfast natives Joseph and Nancy Agnes Greer. Following the death of Joseph Greer in 1829, Greer's mother supported the family by taking on a number of jobs, including laundry, nursing, and serving meals for local medical students.

Elizabeth was educated in the female seminary in Worthington, and following her graduation was engaged as a teacher there, learning much from its Principal Miss Sereptu Marsh. She held the position until her marriage, on April 15, 1844, to Harvey Coit, of Columbus, Ohio. The couple had eight children, including Ethical Culture leader and founder of the American settlement house movement Stanton Coit, upon whom Elizabeth was a significant influence. Another child, Belle Coit Kelton also became a prominent suffragist.

During the American Civil War, Coit served on the Sanitary Commission, working to improve cleanliness and increase access to medical care at military camps. She co-founded, and was involved in drafting the constitution of, the Soldiers' Aid Society, and remained closely involved with the Society for three years, advocating widely on behalf of sick and wounded soldiers.

== Suffrage ==
Coit was an active figure in Ohio's suffrage and temperance movements. On June 18, 1884, Elizabeth and her daughter, Belle, attended a conference of the Ohio Woman Suffrage Association. The Ohio State Journal belittled the conference, reporting it under the headline 'Female Frivolities.' Inspired, on June 24, she founded the first women's suffrage organization in Columbus: the Columbus Equal Rights Association. She acted as its president, and became treasurer of the Ohio Woman Suffrage Association. Coit played a significant part in driving and strengthening the OWSA, which met annually from 1884 to 1920, when it was dissolved and reformed as the Ohio League of Women Voters. She hosted many notable American suffragists and campaigners, including Mary Livermore, Susan B. Anthony, Frances Willard, and Lucy Stone.

In 1898, at the 13th Annual Conference of the OWSA, a reporter from the Cincinnati Enquirer described Coit as one 'whose venerable face bespeaks the courage and peace of a victor'. In his report of the conference, he wrote:

Few women have the good fortune to see as much fruition of her devoted toil as Mrs. Coit. Her personality is a strong argument and conclusion of historical characteristics of the movement in Ohio. All her instincts and aspirations are linked with the interests of the state... Living at the capital, she has felt the injustices of every intense condition which has swept over the commonwealth in the last 50 years. She has been involved in this movement for woman suffrage from its inception and has woven into the weft of her womanly nature the hallowed memory of some of Ohio’s greatest minds—not seated with honored men around the statues at the State Capitol—but deeply ingrained with the history of freedom in this state of most honored men. …She is the living link between the great past and the living present, greatly honored by all her associations in the work.

Coit presented a paper titled 'The Status of Women in 1848', comparing the experience of being a suffragist in 1848 and 1898. Between 1884 and 1900, Coit actively lobbied for the Susan B. Anthony Amendment, and for a state suffrage amendment in Ohio. She advocated for sex equality in education, employment opportunities, and school board suffrage, as well as for laws to protect women.

== Death ==
Elizabeth Greer Coit died of cerebral embolism on May 29, 1901, and was interred in the family plot at Green Lawn Cemetery on May 31. Coit's name, and that of her daughter and fellow suffragist Belle Coit Kelton, are inscribed on a commemorative plaque in the Ohio Statehouse, honouring forty-seven of the state's most prominent suffragists.
