= Caroline McCullough Everhard =

American suffragist (1843–1902)

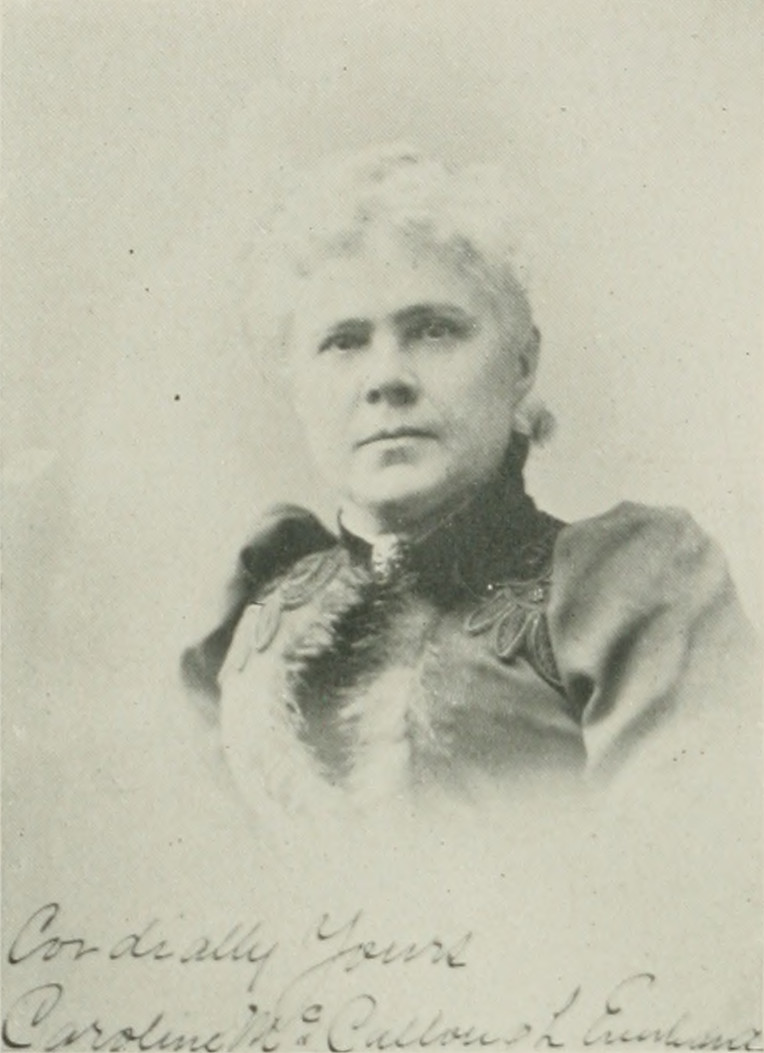
- Caroline McCullough Everhard
- Born: Caroline Jane McCullough; September 14, 1843; Massillon, Ohio, U.S.
- Died: April 14, 1902 (aged 58); Massillon, Ohio, U.S.
- Occupations: Banker; suffragist
- Known for: first woman bank director in Ohio
- Spouse: Henry Hewitt Everhard (m. 1865)

Caroline Jane McCullough Everhard (September 14, 1843 – April 14, 1902) was an American banker and suffragist, president of the Ohio Suffrage Association.

== Early life ==
Caroline Jane McCullough was born on September 14, 1843, in Massillon, Ohio, to Nancy Warriner (née Melendy) and Thomas McCullough. Her father was a bank president. She attended Massillon High School. One of her teachers at school in Massillon was abolitionist Betsy Mix Cowles. As a teenager, she attended a lecture by Lucretia Mott, adding another example of female activism to her early experiences. She graduated valedictorian from Brooke Hall in Media, Pennsylvania, in 1862.

== Career ==
In 1885, Caroline McCullough Everhard was appointed to her late father's position on the board of directors of the Union Bank in Massillon, making her the first woman bank director in Ohio. She also founded the town's humane society, public library, and women's cemetery association. In 1889, she represented her local suffrage association at the Ohio state convention.

From 1891 to 1900, Everhard served as president of the Ohio Suffrage Association. In 1894, she led the successful effort to secure school suffrage for Ohio women. She also gained for Ohio women the right to vote in municipal elections. She was among the suffrage activists who spoke at a hearing of the House judiciary committee in Washington D. C. in 1896, led by Susan B. Anthony. Everhard's remarks gave her reasons for activism:

You probably wonder, even if you have not asked, why we are not at home looking after our families instead of coming to Washington to pester you. It is just because we want to take better care of our homes that we have come. I for one pay enough in taxes every year to buy a farm and yet I have no right to say how they shall be collected or how expended. It is a mistake to say that women do not want the ballot, for in Ohio, where we have been given school suffrage, interest has grown rapidly, and now women who at first did not even want school suffrage have been educated into being full-fledged suffragists."

== Personal life ==
Caroline McCullough married Henry Hewitt Everhard on November 7, 1865. Her husband was a veteran of the American Civil War. They had three children, Ethel Rebecca, Marian (or Marion), and Melville McCullough. Caroline McCullough Everhard died on April 14, 1902, aged 58 years, in Massillon, after an unsuccessful operation for a tumor in her neck. Her papers, including her journals, are archived at the Massillon Museum.

Her son Melville Everhard loaned portraits of Caroline Everhard and her parents to the Massillon Museum in 1935. She was one of the women featured in a documentary, Women in the Western Reserve, produced by Youngstown State University for the United States Bicentennial in the 1970s.
