= Susan Devoy =

New Zealand squash player (born 1964)

Dame Susan Devoy
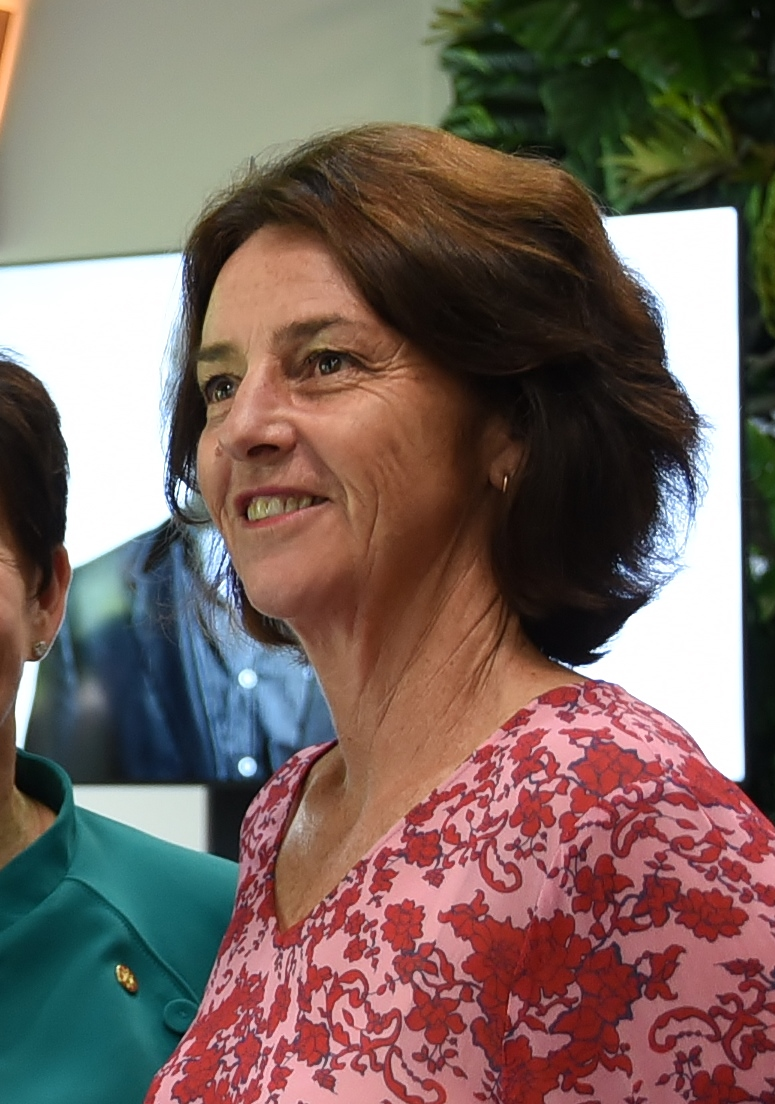
- Devoy in 2018

Personal information
- Full name: Susan Elizabeth Anne Devoy
- Born: 4 January 1964 (age 62) Rotorua, New Zealand

Sport
- Country: New Zealand
- Handedness: Right handed
- Turned pro: 1981
- Retired: 1992

Women's singles
- Highest ranking: No. 1 (April 1984)
- World Open: W (1985, 1987, 1990, 1992)
Medal record
Women's squash
Representing New Zealand
World Championships
| Gold medal – first place | 1985 Dublin | Singles |
| Gold medal – first place | 1987 Auckland | Singles |
| Gold medal – first place | 1990 Sydney | Singles |
| Gold medal – first place | 1992 Vancouver | Singles |
| Silver medal – second place | 1989 Warmond | Singles |
| Bronze medal – third place | 1983 Perth | Singles |

10th Race Relations Commissioner
- In office 2013–2018
- Preceded by: Joris de Bres
- Succeeded by: Meng Foon

Dame Susan Elizabeth Anne Devoy DNZM CBE (born 4 January 1964) is a New Zealand former squash player and senior public servant. As a squash player, she was dominant in the late 1980s and early 1990s, winning the World Open on four occasions. She served as New Zealand's race relations commissioner from 2013 to 2018.

== Early life and family ==
Devoy was born in Rotorua, the youngest of seven children and her parents' only daughter. Her family, including her six brothers, also played squash and Devoy started playing when she was very young. She began playing in tournaments when she was nine and turned professional at the age of 17 after leaving MacKillop College halfway through her final year. She competed on the professional circuit for eleven years from 1981 to 1992.

She married her manager and fellow squash player John Oakley, on 12 December 1986 in Rotorua's St Michael's Church. Together, they have four sons, the eldest of whom is track athlete Julian Oakley. Julian is an NCAA Division I athlete at Providence College, in Rhode Island, United States, and has a 3:57.22 personal best for the mile.

== Playing career ==
Devoy turned professional at the age of 17. Her first World Open title came in 1985, with a subsequent win in 1987. Further World Open titles came in 1990 and 1992. For most of her career, the World Open was held biennially, a fact that stopped Devoy potentially doubling her tally. She did, however, win the coveted British Open eight times, a record behind only Heather McKay's in the 1960s/70s and Janet Morgan's in the 1950s.

In 1992, the year of her unexpected retirement, she was the Australian, British, French, Hong Kong, Irish, New Zealand, Scottish, Swedish and World squash champion.

=== World Open Finals: 5 (4 titles, 1 runner-up) ===
| Outcome | Year | Location | Opponent in the final | Score in the final |
|---|---|---|---|---|
| Winner | 1985 | Dublin, Ireland | (England) Lisa Opie | 9–4, 9–5, 10–8 |
| Winner | 1987 | Auckland, New Zealand | (England) Lisa Opie | 9–3, 10–8, 9–2 |
| Runner-up | 1989 | Warmond, Netherlands | (England) Martine Le Moignan | 4–9, 9–4, 10–8, 10–8 |
| Winner | 1990 | Sydney, Australia | (England) Martine Le Moignan | 9–4, 9–4, 9–4 |
| Winner | 1992 | Vancouver, Canada | (Australia) Michelle Martin | 9–4, 9–6, 9–4 |

== Awards and honours ==
In the 1986 New Year Honours, Devoy was appointed a Member of the Order of the British Empire, for services to squash, and elevated to Commander of the Order of the British Empire in the 1993 Queen's Birthday Honours, for services to squash and the community. She was named New Zealand Sports Person and Sports Woman of the Year in 1985. In 1990, she was awarded the New Zealand 1990 Commemoration Medal.

In the 1998 Queen's Birthday Honours, Devoy was appointed a Dame Companion of the New Zealand Order of Merit, for services to sport and the community, becoming the youngest New Zealander since Sir Edmund Hillary to receive a titular honour.

== Post-playing career ==
In the October 2001 local elections, she successfully stood in the inaugural district health board elections for Auckland DHB on the Citizens & Ratepayers-Now ticket. She resigned from that position in February 2004, citing concerns about limited political impact that DHBs have but also because she had since moved to Tauranga.

In Tauranga, she was the chief executive of Sport Bay of Plenty and held that position for five years.

In April 2009 an accusation was made that the testimonial Devoy wrote for Tony Veitch in support of the return of his passport was edited and used in his support at his sentencing for injuring with reckless disregard in relation to an assault on his former partner Kristin Dunne-Powell in 2006.

== New Zealand race relations commissioner ==
In March 2013, Devoy was chosen as the successor to Joris de Bres for the position of race relations commissioner. She was selected by Justice Minister Judith Collins, who was later forced to defend the appointment, which was surrounded by some controversy, including concern over prior remarks by Devoy including in her role as a Bay of Plenty Times columnist. In particular, references were made to her criticism of Waitangi Day as a national holiday, and those who wear burqas in New Zealand. The Mana Party called for her sacking, and the Green Party said her views on Waitangi Day were "embarrassing".

Devoy officially began her five-year job on 1 April 2013. During her first few weeks in office, Devoy was criticised for refusing to comment on a number of race-related controversies, including a tirade against Chinese immigrants by New Zealand First leader Winston Peters.

Through the remainder of her tenure, Devoy publicly challenged some politicians on their race relations positions. She said that politicians are role models and "it’s my job to call them out". She said NZ First leader Winston Peters' retelling of Arthur Calwell's comment that "two Wongs don't make a White" was "outdated rhetoric" with "no place in New Zealand's future". When ACT leader Jamie Whyte equated Māori with pre-revolutionary French aristocrats, Devoy said it was "grotesque and inflammatory" to equate Māori, whose socio-economic status lags behind other New Zealanders, with aristocrats murdered because of their privilege. In 2015, some Chinese people in New Zealand were "dismayed" when Labour MP Phil Twyford released data equating "Chinese sounding" surnames with foreigners while Devoy opined that it was "deeply offensive" for Chinese children to hear MPs insinuating their Chinese sounding surnames meant they were foreigners when their families had, in her opinion, helped and continued to help build New Zealand. Devoy also criticised NZ First MP Ron Mark for telling Korean-born National MP Melissa Lee to go back to Korea if she didn't like it in New Zealand. Devoy argued that New Zealand citizens born overseas are "not second class citizens" and "have a right to an opinion". All politicians stood by their statements with Whyte calling for her resignation. Devoy also called on Prime Minister John Key to meet with New Zealand Muslim leaders as tensions in the Middle East continued to rise.

Devoy also spoke out against what she views as 'everyday racism' regularly supporting those who have spoken out and encourage New Zealanders to "not stand by" while others are racially abused. Māori New Zealander Rikki Hooper was humiliated while shopping in her supermarket, while Muslims and Jews have also criticised abuse and attacks as have rugby players in Canterbury and taxi drivers in Southland.

Devoy regularly called for an increase in the country's annual refugee quota, which at that time had remained unchanged since 1987.

In the wake of the November 2015 Paris attacks, Devoy and Hazim Arafeh, president of the Federation of Islamic Associations of New Zealand, released a joint statement condemning violent extremism and "standing alongside all innocent victims of terrorism in peace, solidarity and humanity." Following the Christchurch mosque shootings in March 2019, Devoy called on New Zealanders to listen to the voices of vulnerable people, challenge hate, and "stand up for human rights by letting Muslim Kiwis know that you've got their back."

Devoy's term ended in 2018 and she was succeeded the following year by former Gisborne Mayor Meng Foon.

== Later life ==
She currently lives in Tauranga. She is a supporter of a New Zealand republic. Devoy has supported charities including as New Zealand patron for the Muscular Dystrophy Association. In 2007, she appeared on Like Minds, Like Mine TV commercials in New Zealand to counter the stigma and discrimination associated with mental illness. As a contestant on Celebrity Treasure Island 2022, where she was an intruder who entered the show partway through the competition, her chosen charity was The Aunties. In 2024 Devoy published her memoir, titled Dame Suzy D: My Story.

== See also ==
- List of WISPA number 1 ranked players
- Official Women's Squash World Ranking

== Bibliography ==
- Devoy, Susan (2024). Dame Suzy D: My Story. Allen & Unwin NZ. ISBN 9781991006523.

Sporting positions
| Preceded by Vicki Cardwell; Lisa Opie | World No. 1 April 1984 – February 1988; May 1988 – April 1993 | Succeeded by Lisa Opie; Michelle Martin |
Awards
| New award | New Zealand's Sportswoman of the Year; 1987, 1988; 1993 | Succeeded by Erin Baker |
| Preceded by Annelise Coberger | New Zealand's Sportswoman of the Year; 1987, 1988; 1993 | Succeeded by Sarah Ulmer |
| Preceded by Ian Ferguson | Halberg Awards – Supreme Award; 1985 | Succeeded by Richard Hadlee |
