= Flavia Roberts =

Brazilian and English squash player

Personal information
- Born: 29 July 1961 (age 64)

Sport
- Country: Brazil/England

Flavia Roberts (born 29 July 1961) is a former Brazilian and English professional squash player.

Flavia was born in Brazil, but moved to England residing in Southampton. She represented Hampshire at county level and reached the top ten in the English national rankings and top sixteen in the world rankings. She competed in the British Open Squash Championships throughout the late eighties and the nineties. She represented Brazil at 2000 Women's World Team Squash Championships held in Sheffield.
