= Carin Clonda =

Squash player

Personal information
- Nationality: Australian
- Born: 1 March 1961 (age 65) Manly, New South Wales, Australia

Sport
- Highest ranking: 5 (January 1984)
Medal record
Women's squash
Representing Australia
World Championships
Bronze medal – third place	1983 Perth	Singles
World Team Championships
Gold medal – first place	1983 Perth	Team
Bronze medal – third place	1985 Dublin	Team

Carin Lydia Clonda (born 1 March 1961) is an Australian former professional squash player and sports administrator.

== Early life ==
Clonda was born in the Sydney suburb of Manly, to an Estonian mother and Romanian father.

== Squash playing career ==
She was introduced to squash at the age of 13, and began to play competitively, winning the Australian Under-16 title after playing for two years. In 1978 she won the New South Wales and Australian Junior Women's Championships in the Under-15, Under-16 and Under-17 age groups. In the same year, she was diagnosed with chronic asthma, and took eighteen months off to undergo respiratory treatment, but resumed playing after gaining weight due to the treatment.

In 1979, she became the de facto under-19 world champion when she won the British Junior Women's Open, there being no higher championship in that age range.

== Sports administration ==
From 2005 to 2009, Clonda was the CEO and director of NSW Squash, the organisation which develops, organises and promotes the sport of squash in New South Wales. She also managed the organisation's squash facilities at the Thornleigh Squash Centre.

She has served as a squash administrator and manager for several major sporting events including the 2002 Gay Games in Sydney, and the 2006 Commonwealth Games in Melbourne.

In 2010, Clonda founded the Australian Squash Group, a non-profit consultancy group, with fellow squash champion David Palmer.

== Court dispute ==
In 2012, Clonda was involved in a court dispute with NSW Squash and Justice Michael Pembroke of the Supreme Court of New South Wales ruled against her company. As a result of the court judgement, the Governor-General cancelled her award of the Medal of the Order of Australia.

Between 2012 and 2016, Clonda filed three claims against NSW Squash Ltd that were subsequently settled between the parties.

== Personal life ==
=== Health issues ===
In addition to chronic asthma, Clonda experienced numerous health issues during her sporting career, but continued to compete regardless. In 1989, she underwent surgery to remove a tumour from her leg, and then spinal fusion surgery which held a risk of permanent paralysis.

She then experienced chronic fatigue syndrome and the resulting damage to her immune system saw her deal with worsening asthma, infections, a dislocated pelvis and recurrence of her tumour.

In 2009 Clonda underwent bilateral hip replacements. In 2016 Clonda suffered a heart attack.

=== Sexuality ===
Clonda was the first professional squash player to come out as gay, and says she experienced considerable hostility—although more from outside the squash community than within it. In 2008, she was a "Games Champion" of the first AsiaPacific Outgames held in Melbourne.

== Honours ==
In 2000, Clonda was awarded the Australian Sports Medal, with the citation "NSW & Australian Representative 1978–1985. Australian & British Junior Champion".

In 2008, she was awarded the Sue Fear Award, named after mountaineer Sue Fear, for courage and achievement in overcoming serious illness to be successful in competitive squash.

In 2010, she was awarded the Medal of the Order of Australia (OAM), but the award was revoked in 2013 after an adverse finding in a court dispute.
