= 2012 in squash sport =

This article lists the results for the sport of Squash in 2012.

== 2012 PSA World Series ==
- (United States) Tournament of Champions (January 20–26): (England) Nick Matthew defeated (England) James Willstrop 8-11, 11-9, 11-5, 11-7.
- (United States) North American Open (February 20–25): (England) James Willstrop defeated (Egypt) Ramy Ashour 11-7, 11-8, 11-7.
- (Egypt) El Gouna International (April 8–13): (Egypt) Ramy Ashour defeated (England) James Willstrop 12-10, 11-5, 5-2 rtd.
- (United Kingdom) British Open (May 14–20): (England) Nick Matthew defeated (Egypt) Ramy Ashour 11-9, 11-4, 11-8.
- (United States) US Open (October 6–12): (Egypt) Ramy Ashour defeated (France) Grégory Gaultier 11-4, 11-9, 11-9.
- Hong Kong Open (November 27–December 2): (Egypt) Ramy Ashour defeated (England) James Willstrop 11-8, 3-11, 11-7, 11-6.

=== PSA World Series Finals ===
- PSA World Series Finals at London, England. January 2–6, 2013
  - (Egypt) Amr Shabana defeated (England) Nick Matthew 4-11, 11-2, 11-4, 11-7.

=== PSA World Championship ===
- PSA World Championship at Doha, Qatar. December 7–14, 2012
  - (Egypt) Ramy Ashour defeated (Egypt) Mohamed El Shorbagy 2-11, 11-6, 11-5, 9-11, 11-8.

== 2012 WSA World Series ==
- (Malaysia) Kuala Lumpur Open (March 26–31): (Malaysia) Nicol David defeated (Hong Kong) Annie Au 11-4, 12-10, 11-9.
- (United Kingdom) British Open (May 15–20): (Malaysia) Nicol David defeated (Egypt) Nour El Sherbini 11-6, 11–6, 11-6.
- (Malaysia) Malaysian Open (September 12–15): (Egypt) Raneem El Weleily defeated (Malaysia) Nicol David 12-10, 11-13, 11-6, 11-2.
- (United States) US Open (October 7–12): (Malaysia) Nicol David defeated (Egypt) Raneem El Weleily 14-12, 8-11, 11-7, 11-7.
- Hong Kong Open (November 27–December 2): (Malaysia) Nicol David defeated (France) Camille Serme 11-9, 11-6, 8-11, 11-7.

=== WSA World Series Finals ===
- WSA World Series Finals at London, England. January 2–6, 2013
  - (Malaysia) Nicol David defeated (England) Laura Massaro 11-3, 11-2, 11-9.

=== WSA World Championship ===
- WSA World Championship at Grand Cayman, Cayman Islands. December 16–21, 2012
  - (Malaysia) Nicol David defeated (England) Laura Massaro 11-6, 11-8, 11-6.

=== World Team Squash Championships ===
- Women's World Team Championships at Nîmes, France. November 12–17, 2012
  - (gold) Egypt, (silver) England, (bronze) Malaysia
