= 2012 in sports =

2012 in sports various events were held, notably the Summer Olympics were held in London, United Kingdom.

== Events by month ==
=== January ===
Date	Sport	Venue/Event	Status	Winner/s
5 - 11	Squash	(England) 2011 PSA World Series Finals	International	(Egypt) Amr Shabana, (Malaysia) Nicol David
9	American football	(United States) 2012 BCS National Championship Game	Domestic	University of Alabama
14	Mixed martial arts	(Brazil) UFC 142: Aldo vs. Mendes	International	(Brazil) José Aldo
15	Marathon	(India) Mumbai Marathon	international	(Kenya) Laban Moiben, (Ethiopia) Netsanet Achamo
16 - 29	Tennis	(Australia) 2012 Australian Open	International	(Serbia) Novak Djokovic, (Belarus) Victoria Azarenka
20	Mixed martial arts	(United States) UFC on FX: Guillard vs. Miller	International	(United States) Jim Miller
20 - 26	Squash	(United States) Tournament of Champions 2012	International	(England) Nick Matthew
22	Field hockey	(India) 2012 World Series Hockey	International	Sher-e-Punjab
24 – 4 July	Association football	2012 Copa Libertadores	Continental	(Brazil) Corinthians
26 – 12 February	Baseball	(Australia) 2012 Australian Baseball League postseason	Domestic	(Western Australia) Perth Heat
27	Marathon	(United Arab Emirates) Dubai Marathon	International	(Ethiopia) Ayele Abshero, Aselefech Mergia
28	Mixed martial arts	(United States) UFC on Fox: Evans vs. Davis	International	(United States) Rashad Evans
29 –5 February	Bandy	(Kazakhstan) 2012 Bandy World Championship	International	Sweden

=== February ===
Date	Sport	Venue/Event	Status	Winner/s
3 – 6 October	Rugby league	(England) / (France) Super League XVII	Binational	(England) Leeds Rhinos
4	Mixed martial arts	(United States) UFC 143: Diaz vs. Condit	International	(United States) Carlos Condit
4 – 17 March	Rugby union	(England) / (France) / (Ireland) / (Italy) / (Scotland) / (Wales) 2012 Six Nations Championship	Continental	Wales
5	American football	(Indiana) , (United States) Super Bowl XLVI	Domestic	(New York (state)) New York Giants
9 – 17 May	Darts	(United Kingdom) / (Republic of Ireland) 2012 Premier League Darts	International	(England) Phil Taylor
10 - 10 November	Association football	2012 AFC Champions League	Continental	(South Korea) Ulsan Hyundai
15	Mixed martial arts	(United States) UFC on Fuel TV: Sanchez vs. Ellenberger	International	(United States) Jake Ellenberger
18 – 18 November	Auto racing	(United States) 2012 NASCAR Sprint Cup Series	Domestic	(Michigan) Brad Keselowski
20 - 25	Squash	(United States) North American Open 2012	International	(England) James Willstrop
24 – 4 August	Rugby union	(Australia) / (New Zealand) / (South Africa) 2012 Super Rugby season	International	(New Zealand) Chiefs
26	Mixed martial arts	(Japan) UFC 144: Edgar vs. Henderson	International	(United States) Benson Henderson
27	Auto racing	(United States) 2012 Daytona 500		(Wisconsin) Matt Kenseth

=== March ===
Date	Sport	Venue/Event	Status	Winner/s
1 – 30 September	Rugby league	(Australia) / (New Zealand) 2012 NRL season	Binational	(Victoria (state)) Melbourne Storm
3	Mixed martial arts	(Australia) UFC on FX: Alves vs. Kampmann	International	(Denmark) Martin Kampmann
10 – 1 December	Association football	(United States) / (Canada) 2012 Major League Soccer season	Binational	(California) Los Angeles Galaxy
11–22	Cricket	(Bangladesh) 2012 Asia Cup	Continental	Pakistan
13 – 2 April	Basketball	(United States) 2012 NCAA Men's Division I Basketball Tournament	Domestic	University of Kentucky
17 – 3 April	Basketball	(United States) 2012 NCAA Women's Division I Basketball Tournament	Domestic	(Texas) Baylor University
18	Formula One	(Australia) 2012 Australian Grand Prix (F1 #1)	International	(United Kingdom) Jenson Button (McLaren-Mercedes)
24 - 29 September	Australian football	(Australia) 2012 AFL season	Domestic	Sydney Swans
25	Formula One	(Malaysia) 2012 Malaysian Grand Prix (F1 #2)	International	(Spain) Fernando Alonso (Ferrari)
25 - 15 September	IndyCar	(United States) 2012 IndyCar Series	International	(Texas) Ryan Hunter-Reay
26 - 31	Squash	(Malaysia) Kuala Lumpur Open Squash Championships 2012	International	(Malaysia) Nicol David
28 – 28 October	Baseball	(United States) / (Canada) 2012 Major League Baseball season	Domestic	(California) San Francisco Giants

=== April ===
Date	Sport	Venue/Event	Status	Winner/s
4 – 27 May	Cricket	(India) 2012 Indian Premier League	National	Kolkata Knight Riders
8	Motorcycle racing	2012 Qatar motorcycle Grand Prix (MotoGP #1)	International	MotoGP: (Spain) Jorge Lorenzo (Yamaha); Moto2: (Spain) Marc Márquez (Suter); Moto3: (Spain) Maverick Viñales (FTR-Honda)
8 - 13	Squash	(Egypt) El Gouna International 2012	International	(Egypt) Ramy Ashour
14	Mixed martial arts	(Sweden) UFC on Fuel TV: Gustafsson vs. Silva	International	(Sweden) Alexander Gustafsson
15	Formula One	(China) 2012 Chinese Grand Prix (F1 #3)	International	(Germany) Nico Rosberg (Mercedes)
15 - 8 August	Association football	(United States) 2012 U.S. Open Cup	Domestic	(United States) Sporting Kansas City
16	Athletics	(United States) 2012 Boston Marathon	International	Men: (Kenya) Wesley Korir; Women: (Kenya) Sharon Cherop
21	Mixed martial arts	(United States) UFC 145: Jones vs. Evans	International	(United States) Jon Jones
22	Association football	(Australia) 2012 A-League Grand Final	Continental	(Queensland) Brisbane Roar
22	Formula One	2012 Bahrain Grand Prix (F1 #4)	International	(Germany) Sebastian Vettel (Red Bull-Renault)
23	Athletics	(United Kingdom) 2012 London Marathon	International	Men: (Kenya) Wilson Kipsang; Women: (Kenya) Mary Keitany
29	Motorcycle racing	(Spain) 2012 Spanish motorcycle Grand Prix (MotoGP #2)	International	MotoGP: (Australia) Casey Stoner (Honda); Moto2: (Spain) Pol Espargaró (Kalex); Moto3: (Italy) Romano Fenati (FTR-Honda)
29	Athletics	(Germany) 2012 Hamburg Marathon	International	Men: (Ethiopia) Shami Abdulahi; Women: (Ethiopia) Netsanet Achamo

=== May ===
Date	Sport	Venue/Event	Status	Winner/s
1-8	Association football	(Tonga) 2012–13 OFC Champions League Preliminary stage	Continental	(New Caledonia) Mont-Dore
4 - 20	Ice hockey	(Sweden) / (Finland) 2012 IIHF World Championship	International	Russia
5	Association football	(United States) UFC on Fox: Diaz vs. Miller	International	(United States) Nate Diaz
6	Motorcycle racing	(Portugal) 2012 Portuguese motorcycle Grand Prix (MotoGP #3)	International	MotoGP: (Australia) Casey Stoner (Honda); Moto2: (Spain) Marc Márquez (Suter); Moto3: (Germany) Sandro Cortese (KTM)
6	Athletics	(Canada) 2012 Toronto Marathon	International	Men: (Canada) Brendan Kenny; Women: (Canada) Jutta Merilainen
9	Association football	(Romania) 2012 UEFA Europa League Final	Continental	(Spain) Atlético Madrid
11 - 13	Basketball	(Turkey) 2012 Euroleague Final Four	Continental	(Greece) Olympiacos
11 - 30	Chess	(Russia) World Chess Championship 2012	International	(India) Viswanathan Anand
13	Formula One	(Spain) 2012 Spanish Grand Prix (F1 #5)	International	(Venezuela) Pastor Maldonado (Williams-Renault)
14 - 20	Squash	(United Kingdom) 2012 Men's British Open (United Kingdom) 2012 Women's British Open	International	Men: (England) Nick Matthew; Women: (Malaysia) Nicol David
15	Mixed martial arts	(United States) UFC on Fuel TV: The Korean Zombie vs. Poirier	International	(South Korea) The Korean Zombie
18	Rugby union	(England) 2012 European Challenge Cup Final	Continental	(France) Biarritz
19	Association football	(Germany) 2012 UEFA Champions League Final	Continental	(England) Chelsea
19	Association football	(Scotland) 2012 Scottish Cup Final	Domestic	(Scotland) Hearts
19	Rugby union	(England) 2012 Heineken Cup Final	Continental	(Ireland) Leinster
20	Motorcycle racing	(France) 2012 French motorcycle Grand Prix (MotoGP #4)	International	MotoGP: (Spain) Jorge Lorenzo (Yamaha); Moto2: (Switzerland) Thomas Lüthi (Suter); Moto3 (France) Louis Rossi (FTR Honda)
26	Rugby union	(England) 2012 Aviva Premiership Final	Domestic	Harlequins
26	Mixed martial arts	(United States) UFC 146: dos Santos vs. Mir	International	(Brazil) Junior dos Santos
27	Formula One	2012 Monaco Grand Prix (F1 #6)	International	(Australia) Mark Webber (Red Bull-Renault)
27	IndyCar	(United States) 2012 Indianapolis 500	International	(United Kingdom) Dario Franchitti
27	Rugby union	(Ireland) / (Italy) / (Scotland) / (Wales) 2012 RaboDirect Pro12 Final	Continental	(Wales) Ospreys
27 – 11 June	Tennis	(France) 2012 French Open	International	Men's Singles: (Spain) Rafael Nadal; Women's Singles: (Russia) Maria Sharapova
30–11 June	Ice hockey	(United States) / (Canada) 2012 Stanley Cup Final	Domestic	(California) Los Angeles Kings

=== June ===
Date	Sport	Venue/Event	Status	Winner/s
1	Mixed martial arts	(United States) The Ultimate Fighter: Live Finale	International	(Denmark) Martin Kampmann
3	Motorcycle racing	(Spain) 2012 Catalan motorcycle Grand Prix (MotoGP #5)	International	MotoGP: (Spain) Jorge Lorenzo (Yamaha); Moto2: (Italy) Andrea Iannone (Speed Up); Moto3: (Spain) Maverick Viñales (FTR-Honda)
4 – 22	Rugby union	(South Africa) 2012 IRB Junior World Championship	International	South Africa
8	Mixed martial arts	(United States) UFC on FX: Johnson vs. McCall	International	(United States) Demetrious Johnson
8–1 July	Association football	(Poland) / (Ukraine) UEFA Euro 2012	Continental	Spain
9	Rugby union	(France) 2012 Top 14 Final	Domestic	Toulouse
10	Formula One	(Canada) 2012 Canadian Grand Prix (F1 #7)	International	(United Kingdom) Lewis Hamilton (McLaren-Mercedes)
12 - 21	Basketball	(United States) / (Canada) 2012 NBA Finals	Domestic	(Florida) Miami Heat
18 – 30	Rugby union	(United States) 2012 IRB Junior World Rugby Trophy	International	United States
17	Motorcycle racing	(United Kingdom) 2012 British motorcycle Grand Prix (MotoGP #6)	International	MotoGP: (Spain) Jorge Lorenzo (Yamaha); Moto2: (Spain) Pol Espargaró (Kalex); Moto3: (Spain) Maverick Viñales (FTR-Honda)
22	Mixed martial arts	(United States) UFC on FX: Maynard vs. Guida	International	(United States) Gray Maynard
23	Mixed martial arts	(Brazil) UFC 147: Silva vs. Franklin II	International	(United States) Rich Franklin
24	Formula One	(Spain) 2012 European Grand Prix (F1 #8)	International	(Spain) Fernando Alonso (Ferrari)
25 June–8 July	Tennis	(United Kingdom) 2012 Wimbledon Championships	International	Men's Singles: (Switzerland) Roger Federer; Women's Singles: (United States) Serena Williams
30	Motorcycle racing	(Netherlands) 2012 Dutch TT (MotoGP #7)	International	MotoGP: (Australia) Casey Stoner (Honda); Moto2: (Spain) Marc Márquez (Suter); Moto3: (Spain) Maverick Viñales (FTR-Honda)

=== July ===
Date	Sport	Venue/Event	Status	Winner/s
7	Mixed martial arts	(United States) UFC 148: Silva vs. Sonnen II	International	(Brazil) Anderson Silva
8	Motorcycle racing	(Germany) 2012 German motorcycle Grand Prix (MotoGP #8)	International	MotoGP: (Spain) Dani Pedrosa (Honda); Moto2: (Spain) Marc Márquez (Eskil); Moto3: (Germany) Sandro Cortese (KTM)
11	Mixed martial arts	(United States) UFC on Fuel TV: Muñoz vs. Weidman	International	(United States) Chris Weidman
14	Association football	(Romania) 2012 Supercupa României	Domestic	Dinamo București
15	Motorcycle racing	(Italy) 2012 Italian motorcycle Grand Prix (MotoGP #9)	International	MotoGP: (Spain) Jorge Lorenzo (Yamaha); Moto2: (Italy) Andrea Iannone (Speed Up); Moto3: (Spain) Maverick Viñales (FTR-Honda)
21	Mixed martial arts	(Canada) UFC 149: Faber vs. Barão	International	(Brazil) Renan Barão
22	Formula One	(Germany) 2012 German Grand Prix (F1 #10)	International	(Spain) Fernando Alonso (Ferrari)
28 – 12 August	Multi-sport	(United Kingdom) 2012 Summer Olympics	International	Most (gold) medals: (United States) USA
28 – 16 September	Tennis	(United States) 2012 World TeamTennis	Domestic	(Washington, D.C.) Washington Kastles
29	Formula One	(Hungary) 2012 Hungarian Grand Prix (F1 #11)	International	(United Kingdom) Lewis Hamilton (McLaren-Mercedes)
29	Motorcycle racing	2012 United States motorcycle Grand Prix (MotoGP #10)	International	MotoGP: (Australia) Casey Stoner (Honda)

=== August ===
Date	Sport	Venue/Event	Status	Winner/s
3-29 June 2013	Association football	2012–13 Argentine Primera División season	Binational	Torneo Inicial: (Argentina) Vélez Sarsfield, Torneo Final: (Argentina) Newell's Old Boys
4	Mixed martial arts	(United States) UFC on Fox: Shogun vs. Vera	International	(Brazil) Maurício Rua
11	Mixed martial arts	(United States) UFC 150: Henderson vs. Edgar II	International	(United States) Benson Henderson
17-27 May 2013	Association football	(England) 2012–13 Football League Championship	Binational	(England) Cardiff City
18–6 October	Rugby union	(Argentina) / (Australia) / (New Zealand) / (South Africa) 2012 Rugby Championship	International	New Zealand
19	Motorcycle racing	(United States) 2012 Indianapolis motorcycle Grand Prix (MotoGP #11)	International	MotoGP: (Spain) Dani Pedrosa (Honda); Moto2: (Spain) Marc Márquez (Suter; Moto3: (Spain) Luis Salom (Kalex KTM)
19–8 September	Association football	(Japan) 2012 FIFA U-20 Women's World Cup	International	United States
22–2 September	Association football	(India) 2012 Nehru Cup	International	India
27–9 September	Tennis	(United States) 2012 US Open	International	Men's Singles: (United Kingdom) Andy Murray; Women's Singles: (United States) Serena Williams
29–9 September	Multi-sport	(United Kingdom) 2012 Summer Paralympics	International	Most (gold) medals: China

=== September ===
Date	Sport	Venue/Event	Status	Winner/s
1	Mixed martial arts	(United States) UFC 151: Jones vs. Henderson	International	Cancelled
2	Formula One	(Belgium) 2012 Belgian Grand Prix (F1 #12)	International	(United Kingdom) Jenson Button (McLaren-Mercedes)
9	Formula One	(Italy) 2012 Italian Grand Prix (F1 #13)	International	(United Kingdom) Lewis Hamilton (McLaren-Mercedes)
12 - 15	Squash	(Malaysia) Malaysian Open Squash Championships 2012	International	(Egypt) Raneem El Weleily.
22	Mixed martial arts	(Canada) UFC 152: Jones vs. Belfort	International	(United States) Jon Jones
22 - 13 October	Association football	(Azerbaijan) 2012 FIFA U-17 Women's World Cup	International	France
23	Formula One	2012 Singapore Grand Prix (F1 #14)	International	(Germany) Sebastian Vettel (McLaren-Mercedes)
29	Mixed martial arts	(United Kingdom) UFC on Fuel TV: Struve vs. Miocic	International	(Netherlands) Stefan Struve
30	Athletics	(Germany) Berlin Marathon	International	Men: (Kenya) Geoffrey Kiprono Mutai; Women: (Ethiopia) Aberu Kebede.

=== October ===
Date	Sport	Venue/Event	Status	Winner/s
5	Mixed martial arts	(United States) UFC on FX: Browne vs. Bigfoot	International	(Brazil) Antônio Silva
5 - 9	Basketball	(Germany) / (Italy) / (Spain) / (Turkey) 2012 NBA Europe Live Tour	Continental	various
6 - 12	Squash	Men's United States Open 2012; Women's United States Open 2012	Internatinonal	Men: (Egypt) Ramy Ashour; Women: (Malaysia) Nicol David
7	Formula One	(Japan) 2012 Japanese Grand Prix (F1 #15)	International	(Germany) Sebastian Vettel (Red Bull-Renault)
7	Athletics	(United States) Chicago Marathon	International	Men: (Ethiopia) Tsegaye Kebede; Women: (Ethiopia) Atsede Baysa
7	Athletics	(United States) Twin Cities Marathon	International	Men: (Kenya) Christopher Kipyego; Women: (United States) Jeannette Faber
13	Mixed martial arts	(Brazil) UFC 153: Silva vs. Bonnar	International	(Brazil) Anderson Silva
14	Formula One	(South Korea) 2012 Korean Grand Prix (F1 #16)	International	(Germany) Sebastian Vettel (Red Bull-Renault)
14	Athletics	(Canada) Toronto Waterfront Marathon	International	Men: (Ethiopia) Betona Warga; Women: (New Zealand) Mary Davies
23 - 28	Tennis	(Turkey) 2012 WTA Tour Championships	International	Women's singles: (United States) Serena Williams; Women's doubles (Russia) Maria Kirilenko & Nadia Petrova
28	Formula One	(India) 2012 Indian Grand Prix (F1 #17)	International	(Germany) Sebastian Vettel (Red Bull-Renault)
30–4 November	Tennis	(Bulgaria) 2012 Qatar Airways Tournament of Champions	International	(Russia) Nadia Petrova

=== November ===
Date	Sport	Venue/Event	Status	Winner/s
1 - 18	Futsal	(Thailand) 2012 FIFA Futsal World Cup	International	Brazil
3 – 4	Tennis	2012 Fed Cup World Group	International	Czech Republic
4	Formula One	(United Arab Emirates) 2012 Abu Dhabi Grand Prix (F1 #18)	International	(Finland) Kimi Räikkönen (Lotus-Renault)
4	Athletics	(United States) New York City Marathon	International	Cancelled due to Hurricane Sandy
5 - 11	Tennis	(United Kingdom) 2012 ATP World Tour Finals	International	Men's singles: (Serbia) Novak Djokovic; Men's doubles: (Spain) Marcel Granollers & Marc López
10	Mixed martial arts	(China) UFC on Fuel TV: Franklin vs. Le	International	(United States) Cung Le
10	Association football	2012 AFC Champions League Final	Continental	(South Korea) Ulsan Hyundai FC
12–17	Squash	2012 Women's World Team Squash Championships	International	Egypt
16 – 18	Tennis	2012 Davis Cup World Group	International	Czech Republic
17	Mixed martial arts	(Canada) UFC 154: St-Pierre vs. Condit	International	(Canada) Georges St-Pierre
18	Formula One	2012 United States Grand Prix (F1 #19)	International	(United Kingdom) Lewis Hamilton (McLaren-Mercedes)
25	Formula One	(Brazil) 2012 Brazilian Grand Prix (F1 #20)	International	(United Kingdom) Jenson Button (McLaren-Mercedes)
27–2 December	Squash	Men's Hong Kong squash Open 2012; Women's Hong Kong squash Open 2012	International	Men's singles: (Egypt) Ramy Ashour; Women's singles (Malaysia) Nicol David

=== December ===
Date	Sport	Venue/Event	Status	Winner/s
1 - 10	Chess	(United Kingdom) 2012 London Chess Classic	International	(Norway) Magnus Carlsen
6 - 16	Association football	(Japan) 2012 FIFA Club World Cup	International	(Brazil) Corinthians
7 - 14	Squash	(Qatar) 2012 PSA World Championship	International	(Egypt) Ramy Ashour
8	Mixed martial arts	(United States) UFC on Fox: Henderson vs. Diaz	International	(United States) Benson Henderson
12 - 16	Swimming	(Turkey) 2012 FINA World Swimming Championships	International	Most (gold) medals: United States of America
13 - 21	Squash	(Cayman Islands) 2012 WSA World Championship	International	(Malaysia) Nicol David
14–1 January 2013	Darts	(United Kingdom) 2013 PDC World Darts Championship	International	(England) Phil Taylor
15	Mixed martial arts	(Australia) UFC on FX: Sotiropoulos vs. Pearson	International	(United Kingdom) Ross Pearson
15	Mixed martial arts	(United States) The Ultimate Fighter: Team Carwin vs. Team Nelson Finale	International	(United States) Roy Nelson
15–20 January 2013	Field hockey	(India) 2012-13 World Series Hockey	Domestic	Cancelled
26–5 January 2013	Ice hockey	(Russia) 2013 World Junior Ice Hockey Championships	International	United States of America
29	Mixed martial arts	(United States) UFC 155: dos Santos vs. Velasquez 2	International	(United States) Cain Velasquez
29 – 20 January 2013	Ice hockey	(Finland) 2013 IIHF World Women's U18 Championship	International	Canada
29–6 January 2013	Cross-country skiing	(Germany) / (Switzerland) / (Italy) 2012–13 Tour de Ski	International	Men: (Russia) Alexander Legkov; Women: (Poland) Justyna Kowalczyk
29–6 January 2013	Ski jumping	(Germany) / (Austria) 2012–13 Four Hills Tournament	International	(Austria) Gregor Schlierenzauer

== American football ==
- Super Bowl XLVI – the New York Giants (NFC) won 21–17 over the New England Patriots (AFC)
  - Location: Lucas Oil Stadium
  - Attendance: 68,658
  - MVP: Eli Manning, QB (New York)
- January 9 – BCS National Championship Game in New Orleans (2011 season):
  - The Alabama Crimson Tide won 21-0 over the LSU Tigers to win the 2012 BCS National Championship Game
- March 21 - former Indianapolis Colts quarterback Peyton Manning signs a 5-year, $96 million deal with the Denver Broncos, after considering signing with teams such as the Miami Dolphins, Arizona Cardinals, Seattle Seahawks, and Tennessee Titans. Manning spent his first 13 years with the Colts, leading them to their 2nd Super Bowl title in 2007 and after going 2-14 in 2011 and earning the No. 1 pick in the 2012 draft, Manning was released by the Colts 13 days earlier, and sat out that whole season due to undergoing neck surgeries. In a move that shocked both the media and fans, sophomore quarterback Tim Tebow would be traded to the New York Jets the next day, and just 2 months after he led the 4th seeded Broncos to a playoff win and go 7-4 as a starter. This signing is tied with the New Orleans Saints' signing of Drew Brees in 2006 as the greatest free agency signing in NFL history.

== Aquatics ==
- January 16–29: 2012 Men's European Water Polo Championship in Eindhoven, Netherlands
  - (gold) Serbia, (silver) Montenegro, (bronze) Hungary.
- January 18–28: 2012 Women's European Water Polo Championship in Eindhoven, Netherlands
  - (gold) Italy, (silver) Greece, (bronze) Hungary.
- February 20–26: 2012 FINA Diving World Cup in London, U.K.
- May 14–27: 2012 European Aquatics Championships in Antwerp and Eindhoven
- Aquatics at the 2012 Olympics in London, United Kingdom:
  - Swimming 28 July - 10 August. American swimmer Michael Phelps became the most decorated Olympic athlete of all time, by surpassing soviet gymnast Larisa Latynina. Phelps has won 22 Olympic medals (18 gold, 2 silver and 2 bronze) . The Swimming Medal Table was won by United States with 16 gold, 9 silver and 6 bronze. China was second with 5 gold, 2 silver, 3 bronze. France was third with 4 gold, 2 silver, 1 bronze.
  - Diving 29 July - 11 August
  - Water Polo
    - Men: (gold) Croatia, (silver) Italy, (bronze) Serbia
    - Women: (gold) Spain, (silver) Australia, (bronze) Australia
  - Synchronized Swimming 5–10 August
- 2012 FINA Swimming World Cup in eight different cities in October and November:
  - October 2–3 Dubai, United Arab Emirates United Arab Emirates
  - October 6–7 Doha, Qatar Qatar
  - October 13–14 Stockholm, Sweden Sweden
  - October 17–18 Moscow, Russia Russia
  - October 20–21 Berlin, Germany Germany
  - November 2–3 Beijing, China China
  - November 6–7 Tokyo, Japan Japan
  - November 10–11 Singapore Singapore.

Kenneth To from Australia won the men's race, while Katinka Hosszú from Hungary won the women's race

- December 12–16: 2012 FINA World Swimming Championships (25 m) in Istanbul, Turkey. United States won the medal table with 11 gold, 8 silver and 8 bronze, while China was second with 3 gold, 5 silver, 3 bronze and Hungary was third with 3 gold, 4 silver and 3 bronze.

== Association football ==
- 2012 Africa Cup of Nations in Gabon and Equatorial Guinea (final held in Libreville)
  - Champions: Zambia (first title); Runners-up: Ivory Coast; Third place: Mali.
- UEFA Euro 2012 in Poland and Ukraine (final was held in Kyiv)
  - Spain defeated Italy 4–0 in the final to successfully defend their 2008 Euro title. This is Spain's third Euro title win overall. It also made Spain the first men's team ever to win three consecutive major international competitions (Euro 2008, 2010 World Cup, Euro 2012).
- 2012 FIFA U-17 Women's World Cup in Baku, Azerbaijan
  - Champions: France (first title); Runners-up: North Korea; Third place: Ghana.
- 2012 FIFA U-20 Women's World Cup in Japan (final held in Tokyo)
  - Champions: United States (third title); Runners-up: Germany; Third place: Japan.
- 2011–12 OFC Champions League
  - (New Zealand) Auckland City FC defeats (French Polynesia) AS Tefana 3–1 on aggregate. Auckland City will represent the OFC region in the 2012 FIFA Club World Cup.
- 2011–12 CONCACAF Champions League
  - In a matchup of two Mexican teams, Monterrey defeated Santos Laguna 3–2 on aggregate. Monterrey will represent the CONCACAF region in the 2012 FIFA Club World Cup.
- 2011–12 UEFA Champions League (final held in Munich)
  - (England) Chelsea defeated (Germany) Bayern Munich 4–3 on penalties, after a 1–1 draw after extra time. Chelsea will represent the UEFA region in the 2012 FIFA Club World Cup.
- 2012 Copa Libertadores
  - (Brazil) Corinthians defeated (Argentina) Boca Juniors 4–1 on points in the two-legged final. Corinthians will represent the CONMEBOL region in the 2012 FIFA Club World Cup.
- 2012 AFC Champions League (final held in Ulsan)
  - (South Korea) Ulsan Hyundai defeated (Saudi Arabia) Al-Ahli 3–0. Ulsan Hyundai will represent the AFC region in the 2012 FIFA Club World Cup.
- 2012 CAF Champions League
  - (Egypt) Al-Ahly defeated (Tunisia) Espérance ST 3–2 on aggregate in the two-legged final. Al-Ahly will represent the CAF region in the 2012 FIFA Club World Cup.
- 2012 FIFA Club World Cup in Japan
  - (Brazil) Corinthians defeated (England) Chelsea 1–0 to claim its second title.

== Athletics ==
- March 9–11: 2012 IAAF World Indoor Championships in Istanbul, Turkey
- July 10–15: 2012 World Junior Championships in Athletics in Barcelona, Spain
- June 27 – July 1: 2012 European Athletics Championships in Helsinki, Finland

== Baseball ==
- The Miami Marlins, known as the Florida Marlins until November 11, 2011, opened their new stadium, Marlins Park, on April 4 against the defending World Series champion St. Louis Cardinals.
- October 24–28: In the World Series, the San Francisco Giants swept the Detroit Tigers 4–0, with Giants third baseman Pablo Sandoval named MVP. It was the Giants' second World Series victory in three years.
- October 27–November 5: In the Japan Series, the Yomiuri Giants defeated the Hokkaido Nippon-Ham Fighters 4–2, with Giants starting pitcher Tetsuya Utsumi named MVP.

== Basketball ==
WNBA Finals

The Indiana Fever defeat the Minnesota Lynx 3–1 in the best-of-5 series.

NBA Finals

- Miami Heat win four games to one over the Oklahoma City Thunder
- October 27 : The Oklahoma City Thunder trade James Harden, Cole Aldrich, Daequan Cook, and Lazar Hayward to the Houston Rockets in exchange for Kevin Martin, Jeremy Lamb, two first round picks (which became Steven Adams in 2013 and Mitch McGary in 2014), and a second round pick that became Alex Abrines in 2013, a trade that was heavily criticised by fans and the media as many believe the Thunder would've won a title or possibly become the NBA's next dynasty had they kept the trio of Harden, Russell Westbrook, and Kevin Durant. Having played there until 2021, Harden had his best years in Houston, leading them to 7 straight playoff appearances, the Western Conference Finals in 2015 and 2018, won the 2017–18 MVP award, and in 2018-19, led the Rockets to 32 straight 30-plus point games.

Events

- Barclays Center, a new arena in Brooklyn, opened late in 2012. The New Jersey Nets revealed in 2011 that they will become the Brooklyn Nets starting in the 2012–13 season, when they will begin playing in the new building.
- 2012 NCAA Men's Division I Basketball Tournament – The University of Kentucky wins its eighth national title, defeating the University of Kansas 67–59 at the Mercedes-Benz Superdome in New Orleans.
- 2012 NCAA Women's Division I Basketball Tournament – Baylor University wins its second national title, defeating the University of Notre Dame 80–61 at the Pepsi Center in Denver. The Lady Bears finish the season 40–0, becoming the first team in NCAA basketball history of either sex to win 40 games in a season.
- 2011–12 Euroleague Basketball. Final Four in Istanbul, Turkey - Olympiacos B.C. won, defeating PBC CSKA Moscow.
- South American Basketball Championship 2012 in Argentina - Argentina won, defeating Venezuela in the final.

== Bowling ==
- January 29 : Mike Fagan won his first major championship, in claiming the USBC Masters title.
- February 26 : Pete Weber won his record 5th U.S. Open in dramatic fashion over Mike Fagan.
- April 15: Sean Rash broke his title slump in winning his second major in the PBA Tournament of Champions.

== Canadian football ==
- November 23 – 48th Vanier Cup in Toronto: Laval Rouge et Or 37, McMaster Marauders 14
- November 25 – 100th Grey Cup in Toronto: Toronto Argonauts 35, Calgary Stampeders 22

== Cricket ==
- 2012 Under19 Cricket World Cup was held in Australia.

India defeated Australia in the final and clinched their third title.

- 2012 ICC World Twenty20 was held in Sri Lanka.

West Indies defeated Sri Lanka in the final and clinched their first title.

== Floorball ==
- Men's World Floorball Championships
  - Champion: Sweden
- Women's under-19 World Floorball Championships
  - Champion: Finland
- Champions Cup
  - Men's champion: (Sweden) Storvreta IBK
  - Women's champion: (Sweden) IKSU innebandy

== Futsal ==
- January 31 – February 11: 2012 UEFA Futsal Championship in Croatia (final held in Zagreb)
  - (gold) Spain, (silver) Russia, (bronze) Italy.
- November 2 – November 18: 2012 FIFA Futsal World Cup in Thailand (final to be held in Bangkok)
  - (gold) Brazil, (silver) Spain, (bronze) Italy.

== Golf ==
- September 25 – September 30: 2012 Ryder Cup in Medinah, Illinois, United States - won by Europe.

== Handball ==
- 2012 Pan American Men's Handball Championship in Argentina
- January 15 – January 29: 2012 European Men's Handball Championship in Serbia
  - (gold) Denmark, (silver) Serbia, (bronze) Croatia
- December 3 – December 16: 2012 European Women's Handball Championship in Serbia

== Horse racing ==
Steeplechases

- Cheltenham Gold Cup – Synchronised
- Grand National - Neptune Collonges

Flat races

- Dubai, United Arab Emirates: Dubai World Cup – Monterosso
- English Triple Crown:
  1. 2,000 Guineas Stakes – Camelot
  2. Epsom Derby - Camelot
  3. St. Leger Stakes – Encke
- United States Triple Crown:
  1. Kentucky Derby – I'll Have Another
  2. Preakness Stakes – I'll Have Another
  3. Belmont Stakes – Union Rags
- Breeders' Cup:
  - Day 1:
    - Juvenile Sprint: Hightail
    - Marathon: Calidoscopio
    - Juvenile Fillies Turf: Flotilla
    - Juvenile Fillies: Beholder
    - Filly & Mare Turf: Zagora
    - Ladies' Classic: Royal Delta
  - Day 2:
    - Juvenile Turf: George Vancouver
    - Dirt Mile: Tapizar
    - Filly & Mare Sprint: Groupie Doll
    - Turf Sprint: Mizdirection
    - Juvenile: Shanghai Bobby
    - Turf: Little Mike
    - Sprint: Trinniberg
    - Mile: Wise Dan
    - Classic: Fort Larned

== Kickboxing ==
The following is a list of major noteworthy kickboxing events during 2012 in chronological order.

Date	Event	Alternate Name/s	Location	Attendance	Notes
January 28	It's Showtime 2012 in Leeuwarden	It's Showtime 54	Leeuwarden, Netherlands	—N/a	Badr Hari announces his retirement after 12 years of competition.
February 25	SuperKombat World Grand Prix I 2012	SuperKombat World Grand Prix I	Podgorica, Montenegro	—N/a	Featured the SuperKombat World Grand Prix I 2012 super heavyweight (+96kg) tournament.
March 10	Cro Cop Final Fight	K-1 Final Fight	Zagreb, Croatia	—N/a	Mirko "Cro Cop" Filipović returns to kickboxing after eight years in MMA.
March 23	United Glory 15	—N/a	Moscow, Russia	—N/a	—N/a
May 27	SLAMM: Nederland vs. Thailand VII	SLAMM: Nederland vs. Thailand 7	Almere, Netherlands	—N/a	—N/a
June 30	Music Hall & BFN Group present: It's Showtime 57 & 58	It's Showtime 57 & 58	Brussels, Belgium	—N/a	Peter Aerts announces his retirement after 27 years of competition.

== Lacrosse ==
- May 19: Rochester Knighthawks defeat the Edmonton Rush in Rochester to win their third MILL/NLL title.
- May 27: Northwestern defeats Syracuse 8–6 in the final of the NCAA women's tournament. It is the Wildcats' seventh national title, all in the last eight years.
- May 28: Loyola defeats in-state rival Maryland 9–3 in the final of the NCAA men's tournament. It is the first national title for the Greyhounds.

== Mixed martial arts ==
The following is a list of major noteworthy MMA events by month.

January

1/7 — Strikeforce: Rockhold vs. Jardine

1/14 — UFC 142: Aldo vs. Mendes

1/20 — UFC on FX: Guillard vs. Miller

1/27 — MFC 32 - Bitter Rivals

1/28 — UFC on Fox: Evans vs. Davis

February

2/4 — UFC 143: Diaz vs. Condit

2/11 — ONE Fighting Championship: Battle of Heroes

2/15 — UFC on Fuel TV: Sanchez vs. Ellenberger

2/25 — UFC 144: Edgar vs. Henderson

2/25 — KSW 18: Unfinished Sympathy

March

3/2 — UFC on FX: Alves vs. Kampmann

3/3 — Strikeforce: Tate vs. Rousey

3/16 — M-1 Challenge 31 - Monson vs. Oleinik

3/24 — M-1 Belarus 16 - Belarus Fighting Championship

3/31 — ONE Fighting Championship: War of the Lions

April

4/14 — UFC on Fuel TV: Gustafsson vs. Silva

4/21 — UFC 145: Jones vs. Evans

May

5/4 — MFC 33 - Collision Course

5/5 — UFC on Fox: Diaz vs. Miller

5/12 — KSW 19: Pudzianowski vs. Sapp

5/15 — UFC on Fuel TV: Korean Zombie vs. Poirier

5/19 — Strikeforce: Barnett vs. Cormier

5/26 – UFC 146: dos Santos vs. Mir

June

6/1 — The Ultimate Fighter: Live Finale

6/8 — UFC on FX: Johnson vs. McCall 2

6/21 — M-1 Global - Fedor vs. Rizzo

6/22 — UFC on FX: Maynard vs. Guida

6/23 — UFC 147: Silva vs. Franklin II

6/23 — ONE Fighting Championship: Destiny of Warriors

July

7/7 — UFC 148: Silva vs. Sonnen II

7/11 — UFC on Fuel TV: Muñoz vs. Weidman

7/14 — Strikeforce: Rockhold vs. Kennedy

7/21 — UFC 149: Faber vs. Barão

August

8/4 — UFC on Fox: Shogun vs. Vera

8/10 — MFC 34 - Total Recall

8/11 — UFC 150: Henderson vs. Edgar II

8/18 — Strikeforce: Rousey vs. Kaufman

8/31 — ONE Fighting Championship: Pride of a Nation

September

9/1 — UFC 151: Jones vs. Henderson

9/15 — KSW 20: Fighting Symphonies

9/22 — UFC 152: Jones vs. Belfort

9/29 — UFC on Fuel TV: Struve vs. Miocic

9/29 — Strikeforce: Melendez vs. Healy

9/30 — M-1 Challenge 34 - Emelianenko vs. Gluhov

October

10/5 — UFC on FX: Browne vs. Bigfoot

10/6 — ONE Fighting Championship: Rise of Kings

10/13 — UFC 153: Silva vs. Bonnar

10/26 — MFC 35 - Explosive Encounter

November

11/3 — Strikeforce: Cormier vs. Mir

11/10 — UFC on Fuel TV: Franklin vs. Le

11/17 — UFC 154: St-Pierre vs. Condit

December

12/1 — KSW 21: Ultimate Explanation

12/8 — UFC on Fox: Henderson vs. Diaz

12/14 — UFC on FX: Sotiropoulos vs. Pearson

12/15 — The Ultimate Fighter: Team Carwin vs. Team Nelson Finale

12/29 – UFC 155: Dos Santos vs. Velasquez 2

== Netball ==
International tournaments

Date	Tournament	Winners	Runners up
2–7 July	2012 World University Netball Championship	Great Britain	South Africa
14–21 July	2012 AFNA Championships	Jamaica	Barbados
15–18 August	2012 Diamond Challenge	South Africa	Malawi
25–31 August	2012 Asian Netball Championships	Singapore	Sri Lanka
16–23 September	2012 Constellation Cup	New Zealand	Australia
14 Oct–1 Nov	2012 Netball Quad Series	Australia	New Zealand
9–11 November	2012 Fast5 Netball World Series	New Zealand	England

Major leagues

Host	League	Winners	Runners up
Australia/New Zealand	ANZ Championship	Waikato Bay of Plenty Magic	Melbourne Vixens
United Kingdom	Netball Superleague	Northern Thunder	Surrey Storm

== Rink hockey ==
- 2012 the 50th Rink Hockey European Championship
- 2012 Rink hockey World Club Championship the 4th Rink hockey World Club Championship, Argentine
- 2012 Rink Hockey Ladies World Championship, the 11th Ladies Rink Hockey World Championship, in Argentine
- 2012 B-Rink Hockey World Championship
- 2012 Rink Hockey American Championship

== Road cycling ==
- May 5 – May 27: 2012 Giro d'Italia

Ryder Hesjedal won the Giro, becoming the first Canadian to win a Grand Tour.

- June 30 – July 22: 2012 Tour de France

Bradley Wiggins won the Tour, becoming the first British to win a Grand Tour.

- August 18 – September 9: 2012 Vuelta a España

Alberto Contador won the title for the second time after his first success in 2008.

- September 15 – September 23: 2012 UCI Road World Championships in Limburg, Netherlands

== Rowing ==
- 2012 World Rowing Championships will be held at Plovdiv, Bulgaria between August 15 - August 19.

== Rugby league ==
- 2012 Challenge Cup - Warrington Wolves win, defeating Leeds Rhinos in the final.
- 2012 European Cup - the England Knights won.
- 2012 New South Wales Cup season
- 2012 New Zealand rugby league season
- 2012 National League Cup
- 2012 RFL Championship
- 2012 State of Origin series – Queensland defeats New South Wales 2–1 in the best-of-3 series, extending the northerners' all-time record for consecutive State of Origin wins to seven.
- Super League XVII – Leeds Rhinos defeat Warrington Wolves 26–18 in the Grand Final to claim their second consecutive championship and fifth in the last six seasons.
- 2012 USARL season
- Leeds Rhinos win the 2012 World Club Challenge

== Rugby union ==
- February 4 – 17 March: Six Nations Championship
  - Wales win the championship for the 25th time, also claiming their 11th Grand Slam and 20th Triple Crown.
- May 18: Amlin Challenge Cup Final at The Stoop, London:
  - (France) Biarritz defeat (France) Toulon 21–18 to claim their first Challenge Cup title and first European trophy.
- May 19: Heineken Cup Final at Twickenham, London
  - (Ireland) Leinster crush (Ireland) Ulster 42–14 for their third Heineken Cup, becoming only the second club to successfully defend a Heineken Cup title and the first ever to win the Cup three times in four years.
- IRB Sevens World Series:
  - (gold) New Zealand, (silver) Fiji and (bronze) England. New Zealand claim their second consecutive series crown and tenth overall.
- June 4–22: 2012 IRB Junior World Championship in Cape Town and Stellenbosch, South Africa
  - (gold) South Africa, (silver) New Zealand and (bronze) Wales. This was the first title for South Africa. It was also the first time in the competition's five-year history in which New Zealand did not claim the title.
- June 16–30: 2012 IRB Junior World Rugby Trophy in Salt Lake City, United States
  - (gold) United States, (silver) Japan and (bronze) Tonga. This was the first title for the USA, which will be promoted to the 2013 Junior World Championship at the expense of Italy.
- August 4: Super Rugby Final at Waikato Stadium, Hamilton:
  - The (New Zealand) Chiefs crush the (South Africa) Sharks 37–6 to claim their first-ever title.
- August 18 – October 6: The Rugby Championship
  - New Zealand win the title with a clean sweep in the first season of the newly renamed competition, now including Argentina. Including the competition's previous history as the Tri Nations, this is the All Blacks' 11th series win.

Domestic competitions

- (England) English Premiership Final, May 26 at Twickenham:
  - Harlequins defeat Leicester Tigers 30–23 to claim their first Premiership title. Quins had also finished atop the league table.
- RFU Championship Final, May 23 and May 30:
  - London Welsh defeat Cornish Pirates 66–41 on aggregate to claim the title. London Welsh were initially denied a place in the Premiership due largely to stadium issues, but successfully appealed the denial, placing them in the Premiership for 2012–13 at the expense of bottom finisher Newcastle Falcons.
- Top 14 Final, June 9 at Stade de France, Saint-Denis:
  - Toulouse defeat Toulon 18–12 and lift the Bouclier de Brennus for the 19th time.
- Rugby Pro D2 — Grenoble automatically promoted to Top 14 as champion. Mont-de-Marsan defeat Pau 29–20 in the playoff final to claim the second promotion place. These teams replace Brive and Lyon, which finished on the bottom of the Top 14 table.
- (Ireland) (Italy) (Scotland) (Wales) Pro12 Final, May 27 at RDS Arena, Dublin:
  - (Wales) Ospreys defeat (Ireland) Leinster 31–30 to claim their fourth Celtic League/Pro12 title.
- (England) (Wales) LV Cup (Anglo-Welsh Cup) – Leicester Tigers
- (New Zealand) ITM Cup
  - Premiership Final, October 27 at Rugby League Park, Christchurch: Canterbury defeat Auckland 31–18 for their fifth consecutive provincial title.
  - Championship Final, October 26 at ECOLight Stadium, Pukekohe: Counties Manukau defeat Otago 41–16 to claim their first title at any level of provincial rugby in 32 years. The Steelers are promoted to the 2013 ITM Premiership, replacing bottom-placed Hawke's Bay.
- (South Africa) Currie Cup Final, October 27 at Mr Price Kings Park, Durban:
  - Western Province defeat Sharks 25–18 to claim their first Currie Cup title since 2001.

== Tennis ==
- Australian Open (January 16–29)
  - Women's Singles: Victoria Azarenka defeated Maria Sharapova 6–3, 6–0.
  - Men's Singles: Novak Djokovic defeated Rafael Nadal 5–7, 6–4, 6–2, 6–7^{(5–7)}, 7–5.
- French Open (May 27 – June 11)
  - Women's Singles: Maria Sharapova defeated Sara Errani 6–3, 6–2.
  - Men's Singles: Rafael Nadal defeated Novak Djokovic 6–4, 6–3, 2–6, 7–5.
- Wimbledon (June 25 – July 8)
  - Women's Singles: Serena Williams defeated Agnieszka Radwańska 6–1, 5–7, 6–2.
  - Men's Singles: Roger Federer defeated Andy Murray 4–6, 7–5, 6–3, 6–4.
- Us Open (August 27 – September 9)
  - Women's Singles: Serena Williams defeated Victoria Azarenka 6–2, 2–6, 7–5.
  - Men's Singles: Andy Murray defeated Novak Djokovic 7–6 (10), 7–5, 2–6, 3–6, 6–2.
- WTA Tour Championships at Istanbul, Turkey. October 23 - October 28
  - Serena Williams defeated Maria Sharapova 6-4, 6-3.
- ATP World Tour Finals at London, United Kingdom. November 5 - November 11
  - Novak Djokovic defeated Roger Federer 7–6 (6), 7–5.
- Davis Cup - the Czech Republic wins, defeating Spain in the final.
- Fed Cup World Group - the Czech Republic wins, defeating Serbia in the final.

== Volleyball ==
- Men's CEV Champions League 2011–12
- Women's CEV Champions League 2011–12
- 2012 FIVB World League
- 2012 FIVB World Grand Prix

== Multi-sport events ==
- 2012 Winter Youth Olympics January 13–22 in Innsbruck, Austria
- June 21 – June 24 – 2012 United World Games in Klagenfurt, Austria
- July 27 – August 12 – 2012 Summer Olympics in London, United Kingdom
- August 29 – September 9 – 2012 Summer Paralympics in London, United Kingdom
- 2012 Asian Beach Games in Haiyang, China

== See also ==
- International sports calendar 2012
