= PSA Masters =

Squash tournament for top 32 players

Details
- Event name: PSA Masters
- Location: New Delhi India (2009-2011); Hamilton Bermuda (2005-2006); Doha Qatar (2002-2004); Egypt (2000-2001)
- Website www.punjlloydpsamasters.com

Men's PSA World Tour
- Category: World Series Platinum
- Prize money: $165,000
- Most recent champion(s): (England) James Willstrop
- Current: PSA Masters 2011

The PSA Masters is a squash tournament on the Professional Squash Association (PSA) Tour. It is the only PSA World Tour event which is open exclusively to the top 32 players in the world rankings, and is part of the PSA World Series.

From 2000-01, the event was held in Egypt. It then moved to Qatar from 2002-04, and to Bermuda from 2005-06. The event was not held in 2007-08, and was then staged in New Delhi, India in 2009-2011.

Since 2005, the draw for the event has featured 32 men. Prior to that, it featured 16 players. The 2010 tournament had a women's event.

== Results ==
=== Men's ===
Year	Location	Champion	Runner-up	Score in final
2011	(India) New Delhi	(England) James Willstrop	(France) Grégory Gaultier	19-21, 11-8, 11-4, 6-1
2010	(India) New Delhi	(England) Nick Matthew	(England) James Willstrop	11–8, 11–7, 11–8,
2009	(India) New Delhi	(Egypt) Ramy Ashour	(England) Nick Matthew	11–6, 9–11, 11–9, 11–9
2008	No competition			
2007	No competition			
2006	(Bermuda) Hamilton	(Egypt) Amr Shabana	(England) Peter Nicol	9–11, 11–6, 11–7, 2–11, 11–8
2005	(Bermuda) Hamilton	(Canada) Jonathon Power	(England) Lee Beachill	11–7, 11–4, 11–2
2004	(Qatar) Doha	(England) Peter Nicol	(Australia) David Palmer	15–4, 15–7, 10–15, 15–8
2003	(Qatar) Doha	(Scotland) John White	(France) Thierry Lincou	15–8, 17–15, 17–16
2002	(Qatar) Doha	(Canada) Jonathon Power	(Australia) Stewart Boswell	15–10, 15–7, 8–15, 15–13
2001	(Egypt) Cairo	(Canada) Jonathon Power	(Australia) David Palmer	15–9, 15–13, 15–9
2000	(Egypt) Cairo	(Scotland) Peter Nicol	(Canada) Jonathon Power	15–13, 15–7, 15–6

=== Women's ===
Year	Champion	Runner-up	Score in final
2011	No competition		
2010	(England) Jenny Duncalf	(Australia) Kasey Brown	11–5, 11–4, 11–4
