= 2012 PSA World Series =

PSA World Series 2012

Details
- Event name: PSA World Series 2012
- Website psaworldtour.com/page/SuperSeriesRanking
- Year: World Tour 2012

The PSA World Series 2012 is a series of men's squash tournaments which are part of the Professional Squash Association (PSA) World Tour for the 2012 squash season. The PSA World Series tournaments are some of the most prestigious events on the men's tour. The best-performing players in the World Series events qualify for the annual 2012 PSA World Series Finals tournament. Amr Shabana won his second PSA World Series Squash Finals trophy, beating Nick Matthew in the final.

== PSA World Series Ranking Points ==
PSA World Series events also have a separate World Series ranking. Points for this are calculated on a cumulative basis after each World Series event. The top eight players at the end of the calendar year are then eligible to play in the PSA World Series Finals.

Tournament			Ranking Points
Rank	Prize Money US$	Ranking Points	Winner	Runner up	3/4	5/8	9/16	17/32
World Series	$115,000-$325,000	625 points	100	65	40	25	15	10

== 2012 Tournaments ==
Tournament	Country	Location	Rank	Prize money	Date	2012 Winner
Tournament of Champions 2012	United States	New York City	World Series Gold	$115,000	20–26 January 2012	(England) Nick Matthew
North American Open 2012	United States	Richmond, Virginia	World Series Gold	$115,000	19–25 February 2012	(England) James Willstrop
El Gouna International 2012	Egypt	El Gouna	World Series Gold	$115,000	8–13 April 2012	(Egypt) Ramy Ashour
British Open 2012	England	London	World Series Platinum	$150,000	14–20 May 2012	(England) Nick Matthew
US Open 2012	United States	Philadelphia	World Series Gold	$115,000	5–12 October 2012	(Egypt) Ramy Ashour
Hong Kong Open 2012	Hong Kong	Hong Kong	World Series Platinum	$150,000	27 November - 2 December 2012	(Egypt) Ramy Ashour
World Championship 2012	Qatar	Doha	World Series Platinum	$325,000	7–14 December 2012	(Egypt) Ramy Ashour

== World Series Standings 2012 ==
Performance Table Legend
10	1st Round	15	2nd Round
25	Quarterfinalist	40	Semifinalist
65	Runner-up	**100**	Winner

**Top 16 World Series Standings 2012**
Rank	Player	Number of Tournament	Tournament of Champions	North American Open	El Gouna International	British Open	US Open	Hong Kong Open	World Championship	Total Points
Rank	Player	Number of Tournament	USA (United States)	USA (United States)	EGY (Egypt)	ENG (England)	USA (United States)	HKG (Hong Kong)	QAT (Qatar)	Total Points
1	(Egypt) Ramy Ashour	6	-	65	**100**	65	**100**	**100**	**100**	**530**
2	(England) **James Willstrop**	7	65	**100**	65	40	40	65	40	**415**
3	(England) **Nick Matthew**	7	**100**	40	40	**100**	40	40	40	**400**
4	(France) **Grégory Gaultier**	7	40	40	25	25	65	25	25	**245**
5	(Egypt) **Mohamed El Shorbagy**	6	25	-	25	25	25	15	65	**180**
6	(Egypt) **Amr Shabana**	7	25	25	15	25	25	25	25	**165**
7	(Egypt) **Karim Darwish**	6	10	25	40	-	25	40	25	**165**
8	(England) **Peter Barker**	5	25	-	-	40	25	25	15	**130**
9	(Germany) **Simon Rösner**	7	15	25	15	10	10	10	10	**95**
10	(Australia) Cameron Pilley	7	15	15	10	10	15	15	15	**95**
11	(England) Adrian Grant	7	15	15	15	15	15	10	10	**95**
12	(England) Daryl Selby	5	40	-	-	10	15	15	15	**95**
13	(Spain) Borja Golán	5	10	-	-	15	15	25	25	**90**
14	(Netherlands) Laurens Jan Anjema	5	-	10	25	25	15	-	10	**85**
15	(India) Saurav Ghosal	6	-	10	15	15	10	15	15	**80**
16	(Switzerland) Nicolas Müller	7	15	10	10	10	10	15	5	**75**

Bold – The first eight players present for the final

Final tournament	Country	Location	Prize money	Date	2012 World Series Champion
PSA World Series Finals 2012	England	Queen's Club, London	$110,000	2–6 January 2013	(Egypt) **Amr Shabana**

== See also ==
- PSA World Tour 2012
- Official Men's Squash World Ranking
- WSA World Series 2012
