= Hurghada International =

Squash tournament in Egypt

Details
- Event name: Hurghada International
- Location: Hurghada Egypt

Men's Winner
- Category: International 70
- Prize money: $77,500
- Most recent champion(s): (Egypt) Ramy Ashour
- Current: Men's Hurghada International 2011

Women's Winner
- Category: Silver 20
- Prize money: $20,000
- Most recent champion(s): (Egypt) Raneem El Weleily

The Hurghada International is a squash tournament held in Hurghada, Egypt in May. It is part of the PSA World Tour and the WSA World Tour.

== Past results ==
=== Men's ===
Year	Champion	Runner-up	Score in final
2012	No competition		
2011	(Egypt) Ramy Ashour	(Egypt) Karim Darwish	11-7, 9-11, 12-14, 11-9, 11-3
2010	No competition		
2009	(Egypt) Ramy Ashour	(France) Grégory Gaultier	7-11, 11-5, 11-3, 11-8
2008	(Egypt) Ramy Ashour	(Egypt) Amr Shabana	12-10, 9-11, 11-7, 9-11, 10-12

=== Women's ===
Year	Champion	Runner-up	Score in final
2012	No competition		
2011	(Egypt) Raneem El Weleily	(Egypt) Omneya Abdel Kawy	11-5, 12-10, 11-9
2010	(Egypt) Omneya Abdel Kawy	(Egypt) Engy Kheirallah	11-4, 11-8, 14-12
2009	(Egypt) Omneya Abdel Kawy	(Australia) Rachael Grinham	11-7, 9-11, 11-3, 11-13, 12-10
2008	(Egypt) Omneya Abdel Kawy	(England) Jenny Duncalf	9-1, 9-4, 9-2
2007	(Australia) Rachael Grinham	(Egypt) Omneya Abdel Kawy	9-4, 9-6, 9-4
2006	(Egypt) Omneya Abdel Kawy	(Australia) Rachael Grinham	9-6, 9-2, 7-9, 0-9, 9-2
2005	(Australia) Rachael Grinham	(Egypt) Omneya Abdel Kawy	1-9, 2-9, 9-4, 9-3, 10-8
2004	(Australia) Rachael Grinham	(Egypt) Omneya Abdel Kawy	9-5, 9-1, 9-4
2003	(New Zealand) Carol Owens	(Australia) Rachael Grinham	9-5, 9-1, 9-5
2002	(United States) Natalie Grainger	(England) Cassie Jackman	9-2, 9-2, rtd
