= North American Open 2012 =

- 39th North American Open

Details
- Event name: North American Open 2012
- Location: Richmond, Virginia United States
- Venue: Westwood Club
- Website naosquash.com

Men's Winner
- Category: World Series Gold
- Prize money: $115,000
- Year: World Tour 2012

The North American Open 2012 is the men's edition of the 2012 North American Open, which is a PSA World Series event Gold (Prize money: $115,000). The event took place at the Westwood Club in Richmond, Virginia in the United States from 20 to 25 February. James Willstrop won his second North American Open trophy, beating Ramy Ashour in the final.

== Prize money and ranking points ==
For 2012, the prize purse was $115,000. The prize money and points breakdown is as follows:

Prize Money North American Open (2012)
Event	W	F	SF	QF	2R	1R
Points (PSA)	2015	1325	805	490	290	145
Prize money	$17,500	$11,500	$7,000	$4,250	$2,500	$1,250

== Seeds ==
1. (England) James Willstrop (champion)
2. (England) Nick Matthew (semifinal)
3. (France) Grégory Gaultier (semifinals)
4. (Egypt) Ramy Ashour (final)
5. (Egypt) Karim Darwish (quarterfinals)
6. (Egypt) Amr Shabana (quarterfinals)
7. (Netherlands) Laurens Jan Anjema (first round)
8. (Malaysia) Mohd Azlan Iskandar (second round)

== Draw and results ==
First round
1	(England) James Willstrop	11	11	11
(Switzerland) Nicolas Müller	9	6	6
(France) Thierry Lincou	11	11	11
WC	(Zambia) Patrick Chifunda	3	3	8
(Egypt) Hisham Ashour	7	6	3
(England) Adrian Grant	11	11	11
(India) Siddharth Suchde	3	5	5
6	(Egypt) Amr Shabana	11	11	11
8	(Malaysia) Mohd Azlan Iskandar	11	11	11
Q	(New Zealand) Campbell Grayson	6	8	5
(Australia) Ryan Cuskelly	8	9	9
Q	(Egypt) Karim Abdel Gawad	11	11	11
(India) Saurav Ghosal	11	11	9	6
(Canada) Shahier Razik	13	6	11	11
Q	(England) Oliver Pett	5	6	7
3	(France) Grégory Gaultier	11	11	11
4	(Egypt) Ramy Ashour	11	11	11
Q	(Australia) Matthew Karwalski	8	1	8
(Australia) Cameron Pilley	11	11	9	11
(Canada) Shawn Delierre	6	8	11	8
(Scotland) Alan Clyne	6	3	8
Q	(Australia) Zac Alexander	11	11	11
Q	(France) Mathieu Castagnet	10	6	11	5
5	(Egypt) Karim Darwish	12	11	7	11
7	(Netherlands) Laurens Jan Anjema	11	8	11	5	10
(Botswana) Alister Walker	7	11	8	11	12
(England) Chris Ryder	11	5	5	9
(Germany) Simon Rösner	5	11	11	11
(United States) Julian Illingworth	11	7	2	13
(Finland) Olli Tuominen	8	11	11	15
(Colombia) Miguel Á. Rodriguez	12	12	9	11	5
2	(England) Nick Matthew	14	10	11	9	11

Second round
1	(England) James Willstrop	16	11	11
(France) Thierry Lincou	14	7	6
(England) Adrian Grant	8	5	11	6
6	(Egypt) Amr Shabana	11	11	4	11
8	(Malaysia) Mohd Azlan Iskandar	8	4
Q	(Egypt) Karim Abdel Gawad	11	11
(Canada) Shahier Razik	1	4	4
3	(France) Grégory Gaultier	11	11	11
4	(Egypt) Ramy Ashour	11	11	11
(Australia) Cameron Pilley	6	7	9
Q	(Australia) Zac Alexander	5	4	2
5	(Egypt) Karim Darwish	11	11	11
(Botswana) Alister Walker	6	6	6
(Germany) Simon Rösner	11	11	11
(Finland) Olli Tuominen	9	11	8	2
2	(England) Nick Matthew	11	4	11	11

Quarter finals *
1	(England) James Willstrop	11	2
6	(Egypt) Amr Shabana	2	0
Q	(Egypt) Karim Abdel Gawad	6	2	6
3	(France) Grégory Gaultier	11	11	11
4	(Egypt) Ramy Ashour	12	8	11	11
5	(Egypt) Karim Darwish	10	11	5	3
(Germany) Simon Rösner	7	6	11	6
2	(England) Nick Matthew	11	11	9	11

Semi finals *
1	(England) James Willstrop	11	6	11	11
3	(France) Grégory Gaultier	9	11	7	5
Final
1	(England) James Willstrop *	11	11	11
4	(Egypt) Ramy Ashour	7	8	7
4	(Egypt) Ramy Ashour	12	14	11
2	(England) Nick Matthew	10	11	3

== See also ==
- North American Open
- 2012 Men's British Open

Preceded by Tournament of Champions; USA (New York); 2012	PSA World Series 2012; North American Open; USA (Richmond); 2012	Succeeded by El Gouna International; Egypt (El Gouna); 2012
