= Tournament of Champions 2012 =

- 78th Tournament of Champions
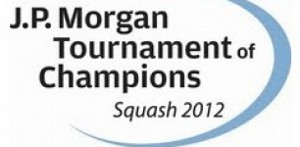

Details
- Event name: J. P. Morgan Tournament of Champions 2012
- Location: New York City United States
- Venue: Grand Central Terminal
- Website www.tocsquash.com

Men's Winner
- Category: World Series Gold
- Prize money: $115,000
- Year: World Tour 2012

The Men's J. P. Morgan Tournament of Champions 2012 is the men's edition of the 2012 Tournament of Champions, which is a PSA World Series event Gold (prize money: $115,000). The event took place at the Grand Central Terminal in New York City in the United States from 20 January to 26 January. Nick Matthew won his first Tournament of Champions trophy, beating James Willstrop in the final.

== Prize money and ranking points ==
For 2012, the prize purse was $115,000. The prize money and points breakdown is as follows:

Prize money Tournament of Champions (2012)
Event	W	F	SF	QF	2R	1R
Points (PSA)	2015	1325	805	490	290	145
Prize money	$17,500	$11,500	$7,000	$4,250	$2,500	$1,250

== Seeds ==
1. (England) Nick Matthew (champion)
2. (England) James Willstrop (final)
3. (France) Grégory Gaultier (semifinals)
4. (Egypt) Karim Darwish (first round)
5. (Egypt) Amr Shabana (quarterfinals)
6. (England) Peter Barker (quarterfinals)
7. (Egypt) Mohamed El Shorbagy (quarterfinals)
8. (France) Thierry Lincou (first round)

== Draw and results ==
First round
1	(England) N Matthew	11	1	9	11
(Egypt) W El Hindi	5	6	11	7
(England) A Grant	1	16	9	11
Q	(Scotland) A Clyne	5	14	11	5
(Finland) O Tuominen	7	3	8
(Australia) C Pilley	11	11	11
(Pakistan) A Atlas Khan	4	10	11	5
7	(Egypt) Mo E Shorbagy	11	12	7	11
(Egypt) A Shabana	11	11	11
(Egypt) M A A Reda	7	8	7
(Egypt) H Ashour	7	11	11	5	9
Q	(Colombia) M Á Rodriguez	11	9	8	11	11
(Switzerland) N Müller	11	11	9	11
Q	(South Africa) S Coppinger	7	4	11	4
(Spain) B Golán	4	9	9
3	(France) G Gaultier	11	11	11
4	(Egypt) K Darwish	11	11	8	5
(England) D Selby	4	13	11	11
(Germany) S Rösner	11	9	11	11
(Egypt) T Momen	9	11	8	7
(England) T Richards	11	11	11
Q	(Hong Kong) M Lee	6	5	4
Q	(Egypt) Ma E Shorbagy	9	11	11	11
8	(France) T Lincou	11	5	7	7
6	(England) P Barker	8	10	11	11	11
Q	(Malaysia) O Beng Hee	11	12	7	7	9
(Canada) S Razik	8	11	11	11
(United States) J Illingworth	11	5	8	6
(Botswana) A Walker	8	9	11	5
Q	(Egypt) M Abbas	11	11	6	11
Q	(Australia) Z Alexander	7	3	4
2	(England) J Willstrop	11	11	11

Second round
1	(England) N Matthew	11	11	12
(England) A Grant	5	7	10
(Australia) C Pilley	11	9	11	6	5
7	(Egypt) Mo E Shorbagy	6	11	8	11	11
5	(Egypt) A Shabana *	11	11	7	4	11
Q	(Colombia) M Á Rodriguez	6	8	11	11	8
(Switzerland) N Müller	4	12	6	1
3	(France) G Gaultier	11	10	11	11
(England) D Selby	11	4	11	13
(Germany) S Rösner	8	11	6	11
(England) T Richards	11	4	11	6	10
Q	(Egypt) Ma E Shorbagy	9	11	7	11	12
6	(England) P Barker	11	11	11
(Canada) S Razik	3	5	4
(Egypt) M Abbas	8	10	2
2	(England) J Willstrop	11	12	11

* Quarter finals *
1	(England) N Matthew	12	11	11
7	(Egypt) Mo E Shorbagy	10	7	5
5	(Egypt) A Shabana	9	11	5	5
3	(France) G Gaultier	11	5	11	11
(England) D Selby	11	11	11
Q	(Egypt) Ma E Shorbagy	8	8	8
6	(England) P Barker	4	3	6
2	(England) J Willstrop	11	11	11

Semi finals *
1	(England) N Matthew	11	11	9	11
3	(France) G Gaultier	8	9	11	4
Final
1	(England) N Matthew *	8	11	11	11
2	(England) J Willstrop	11	9	5	7
(England) D Selby	2	3	3
2	(England) J Willstrop	11	11	11

== See also ==
- Tournament of Champions (squash)
- 2012 Men's British Open

Preceded by Punj Lloyd PSA Masters; India (New Delhi); 2011	PSA World Series 2012; Tournament of Champions; USA (New York); 2012	Succeeded by North American Open; USA (Richmond); 2012
