= Kuwait PSA Cup =

Details
- Event name: Kuwait PSA Cup
- Location: Kuwait City Kuwait
- Website www.kuwaitpsacup.com

Men's Winner
- Category: World Series Platinum
- Prize money: $190,000
- Most recent champion(s): (Egypt) Ramy Ashour
- Current: Kuwait PSA Cup 2013

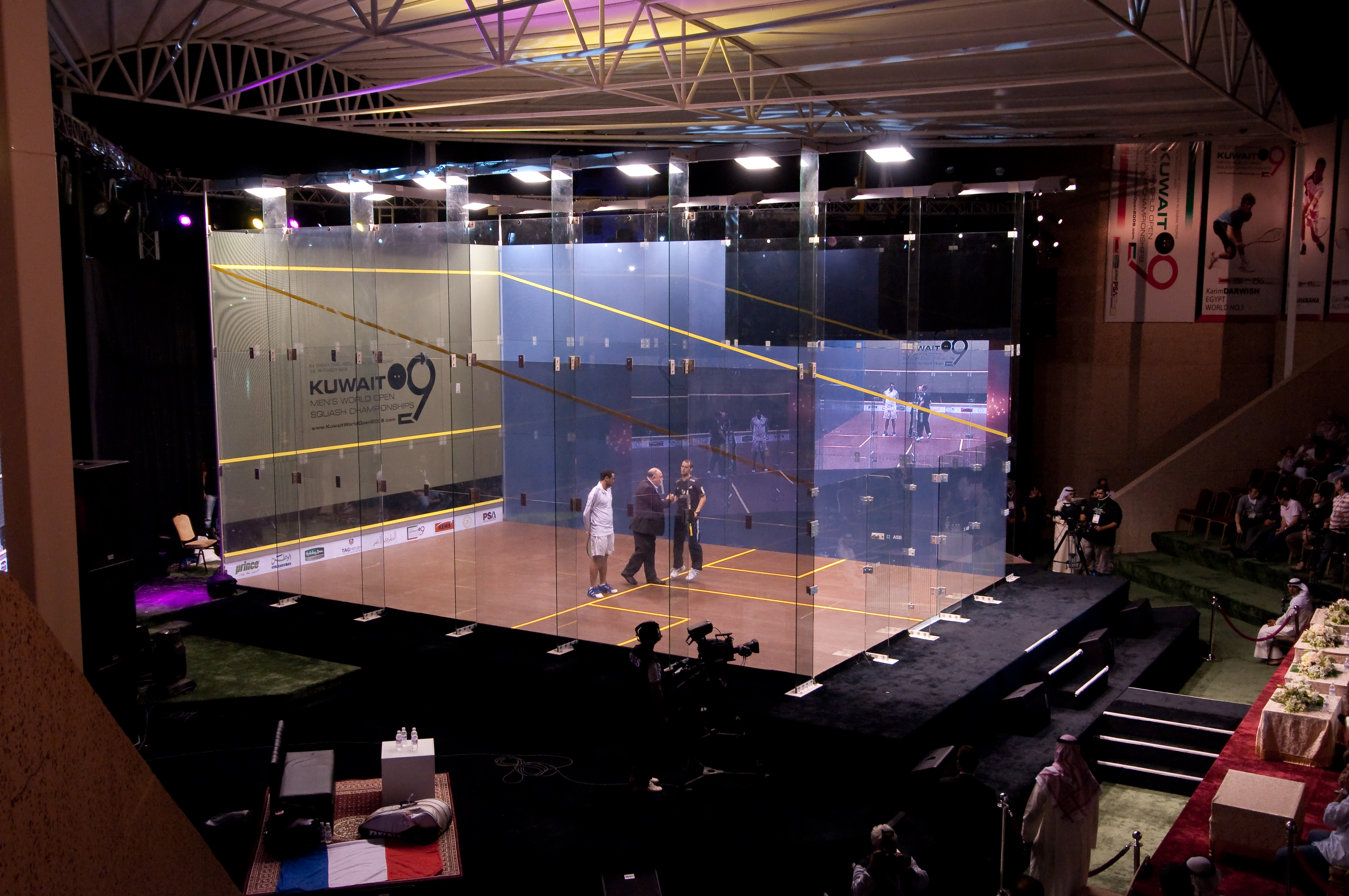
Glass Court of the Kuwait Open

The Kuwait PSA Cup (previously called the Kuwait Open) is an annual men's squash tournament held in Kuwait City, Kuwait in November. It is part of the PSA World Series, the highest level of men's professional squash competition. The event was founded in 2004. Throughout its history, the tournament has been a major stop on the professional circuit, frequently attracting the world's top-ranked players and offering one of the most significant prize purses in the sport.

== Past Results ==
Year	Champion	Runner-up	Score in final
2014	No competition		
2013	(Egypt) Ramy Ashour	(England) James Willstrop	6-11, 11-8, 11-3, 11-3
2012	No competition		
2011	(England) James Willstrop	(Egypt) Karim Darwish	11-7, 10-12, 11-4, 11-2
2010	(Egypt) Ramy Ashour	(Egypt) Amr Shabana	9-11, 11-4, 13-11, 11-1
2009	not held due to the 2009 World Open		
2008	(Egypt) Amr Shabana	(Egypt) Ramy Ashour	11-9, 11-7, 13-11
2007	(Egypt) Ramy Ashour	(Egypt) Amr Shabana	9-5, 9-3, 12-10
2006	No competition		
2005	(Australia) David Palmer	(England) Peter Nicol	4-11, 11-9, 3-11, 6-11
2004	(England) Peter Nicol	(England) James Willstrop	15-13, 9-15, 15-4, 15-8
2003	No competition		
2002	No competition		
2001	No competition		
2000	No competition		
1999	No competition		
1998	(Scotland) Peter Nicol	(Republic of Ireland) Derek Ryan	14-15, 15-11, 15-10, 15-6
1997	(Scotland) Peter Nicol	(Australia) Rodney Eyles	15-6, 12-15, 16-17, 15-8, 15-4
