= El Gouna International 2012 =

- 2nd El Gouna International

Details
- Event name: El Gouna International Squash Open 2012
- Location: El Gouna Egypt
- Venue: Abu Tig Marina
- Website squash.me.uk/elgouna/

Men's Winner
- Category: World Series Gold
- Prize money: $115,000
- Year: World Tour 2012

The El Gouna International 2012 is the men's edition of the 2012 El Gouna International, which is a PSA World Series event Gold (Prize money: $115,000). The event took place at the Abu Tig Marina in El Gouna in Egypt from 8 April to 13 April. Ramy Ashour won his first El Gouna International trophy, beating James Willstrop in the final.

== Prize money and ranking points ==
For 2012, the prize purse was $115,000. The prize money and points breakdown is as follows:

Prize Money El Gouna International (2012)
Event	W	F	SF	QF	2R	1R
Points (PSA)	2015	1325	805	490	290	145
Prize money	$17,500	$11,500	$7,000	$4,250	$2,500	$1,250

== Seeds ==
1. (England) James Willstrop (final)
2. (France) Grégory Gaultier (quarterfinals)
3. (England) Nick Matthew (semifinals)
4. (Egypt) Karim Darwish (semifinals)
5. (Egypt) Ramy Ashour (champion)
6. (Egypt) Amr Shabana (second round)
7. (Egypt) Mohamed El Shorbagy (quarterfinals)
8. (Netherlands) Laurens Jan Anjema (quarterfinals)

== Draw and results ==
First round
1	(England) James Willstrop	11	11	6	11
(Switzerland) Nicolas Müller	8	4	11	4
(India) Saurav Ghosal	8	9	11	11	11
Q	(England) Robbie Temple	11	11	9	7	4
(Egypt) Tarek Momen	11	7	11	11
(Egypt) Mohammed Abbas	8	11	7	9
(Egypt) Omar Abdel Aziz	5	11	4	5
8	(Netherlands) Laurens Jan Anjema	11	6	11	11
7	(Egypt) Mohd El Shorbagy	11	12	11
Q	(Malaysia) Ivan Yuen	7	10	6
(France) Thierry Lincou	2	11	5	11	11
(Australia) Cameron Pilley	11	6	11	5	6
(England) Jonathan Kemp	11	11	11
Q	(Egypt) Omar Abdel Meguid	8	4	5
Q	(England) Adrian Waller	9	6	6
4	(Egypt) Karim Darwish	11	11	11
3	(England) Nick Matthew	11	11	11
Q	(Egypt) A. Wagih Shoukry	5	5	3
(Egypt) M. Ali Anwar Reda	11	11	11
Q	(Egypt) Wael Farag	5	6	5
(Egypt) Hisham Ashour	9	11	14	11
Q	(France) Mathieu Castagnet	11	8	12	9
(Egypt) Karim Abdel Gawad	4	9	9
6	(Egypt) Amr Shabana	11	11	11
5	(Egypt) Ramy Ashour	11	11	11
Q	(Egypt) Amr Khaled Khalifa	7	9	7
(England) Adrian Grant	9	11	5	11	11
(Egypt) Omar Mosaad	11	3	11	1	3
(Germany) Simon Rösner	10	11	12	11	11
(France) Grégoire Marche	12	6	14	9	6
(Egypt) Marwan El Shorbagy	4	9	2
2	(France) Grégory Gaultier	11	11	11

Second round
1	(England) James Willstrop	14	11	11
(India) Saurav Ghosal	12	2	7
(Egypt) Tarek Momen	7	11	9	7
8	(Netherlands) Laurens Jan Anjema	11	8	11	11
7	(Egypt) Mohd El Shorbagy	5	11	11	8	11
(France) Thierry Lincou	11	8	8	11	8
(England) Jonathan Kemp	11	2	2	3
4	(Egypt) Karim Darwish	7	11	11	11
3	(England) Nick Matthew	9	14	11	11
(Egypt) M. Ali Anwar Reda	11	12	6	6
(Egypt) Hisham Ashour	13	9	11	11
6	(Egypt) Amr Shabana	11	11	9	8
5	(Egypt) Ramy Ashour	11	9	11	11
(England) Adrian Grant	4	11	5	1
(Germany) Simon Rösner	6	9	12	1
2	(France) Grégory Gaultier	11	11	10	11

* Quarter finals *
1	(England) James Willstrop	9	11	11	11
8	(Netherlands) Laurens Jan Anjema	11	2	8	5
7	(Egypt) Mohd El Shorbagy	9	11	9	11	6
4	(Egypt) Karim Darwish	11	9	11	6	11
3	(England) Nick Matthew	11	12	11
(Egypt) Hisham Ashour	6	10	7
5	(Egypt) Ramy Ashour	11	12	11
2	(France) Grégory Gaultier	7	10	8

Semi finals
1	(England) James Willstrop	11	11	11
4	(Egypt) Karim Darwish	7	5	2
Final
1	(England) James Willstrop	10	5	2
5	(Egypt) Ramy Ashour *	12	11	5
3	(England) Nick Matthew	4	11	8	9
5	(Egypt) Ramy Ashour *	11	9	11	11

== See also ==
- El Gouna International
- 2012 Men's British Open

Preceded by North American Open; USA (Richmond); 2012	PSA World Series 2012; El Gouna International; Egypt (El Gouna); 2012	Succeeded by British Open; England (London); 2012
