= 2012 PSA World Series Finals =

PSA World Series Finals 2012
- 19th PSA World Series Finals

Details
- Event name: PSA World Series Finals 2012
- Location: London England
- Venue: Queen's Club
- Website www.worldseriesfinals.com

Men's Winner
- Category: PSA World Series Finals
- Prize money: $110,000
- Year: World Series 2012

The 2012 PSA World Series Finals is the men's edition of the 2012 PSA World Series Finals (Prize money : $110 000). The top 8 players in the PSA World Series 2012 were qualified for the event. The event took place at the Queen's Club in London in England between 2–6 January 2013. Amr Shabana won his second PSA World Series Finals trophy, beating Nick Matthew in the final.

== Seeds ==
1. (England) James Willstrop (semifinals)
2. (England) Nick Matthew (final)
3. (France) Grégory Gaultier (semifinals)
4. (Egypt) Mohamed El Shorbagy (first round)
5. (Egypt) Amr Shabana (champion)
6. (Egypt) Karim Darwish (first round)
7. (England) Peter Barker (first round)
8. (Germany) Simon Rösner (first round)

== Group stage results ==
=== Pool A ===
(England) Nick Matthew	6	6	-	11	11	(Egypt) Amr Shabana
(Egypt) Mohamed El Shorbagy	11	11	-	6	7	(England) Peter Barker

(England) Nick Matthew	11	11	-	5	6	(Egypt) Mohamed El Shorbagy
(Egypt) Amr Shabana	11	11	-	8	6	(England) Peter Barker

(England) Nick Matthew	11	12		-	2	10		(England) Peter Barker
(Egypt) Mohamed El Shorbagy	7	11	9	-	11	8	11	(Egypt) Amr Shabana

Rank	Player	Match	Win	Low	Points
1	(Egypt) Amr Shabana	3	3	0	6
2	(England) Nick Matthew	3	2	1	4
3	(Egypt) Mohamed El Shorbagy	3	1	2	2
4	(England) Peter Barker	3	0	3	0

=== Pool B ===
(England) James Willstrop	11	11		-	9	5		(Egypt) Karim Darwish
(France) Grégory Gaultier	10	11	11	-	12	4	7	(Germany) Simon Rösner

(England) James Willstrop	6	11	-	11	13	(France) Grégory Gaultier
(Egypt) Karim Darwish	4	8	-	11	11	(Germany) Simon Rösner

(England) James Willstrop	11	11	-	4	8	(Germany) Simon Rösner
(France) Grégory Gaultier	3	10	-	11	12	(Egypt) Karim Darwish

Rank	Player	Match	Win	Low	Points
1	(France) Grégory Gaultier	3	2	1	4
2	(England) James Willstrop	3	2	1	4
3	(Germany) Simon Rösner	3	1	2	2
4	(Egypt) Karim Darwish	3	1	2	2

== Draw and results ==
Semi finals *
1stA	(Egypt) Amr Shabana	11	8	11
2ndB	(England) James Willstrop	7	11	7
2ndA	(England) Nick Matthew	10	11	11
1stB	(France) Grégory Gaultier	12	9	8

Final
(Egypt) Amr Shabana *	4	11	11	11
(England) Nick Matthew	11	2	4	7

== See also ==
- 2012 WSA World Series Finals
- PSA World Tour 2012
- PSA World Series 2012
- PSA World Series Finals
