= Men's Hong Kong squash Open 2012 =

Cathay Pacific Hong Kong Open 2012
- 26th PSA Hong Kong Open

Details
- Event name: Cathay Pacific Sun Hung Kai Financial Hong Kong Open 2012
- Location: Hong Kong
- Venue: Hong Kong Squash Centre – Tsim Sha Tsui
- Website hksquash.org.hk/hkopen2012/home.php

Men's Winner
- Category: World Series Platinum
- Prize money: $150,000
- Year: World Tour 2012

The Men's Cathay Pacific Hong Kong Open 2012 is the men's edition of the 2012 Hong Kong Open, which is a PSA World Series event Platinum (prize money: 150 000 $). The event take place in Hong Kong from 27 November to 2 December. Ramy Ashour won his second Hong Kong Open trophy, beating James Willstrop in the final.

== Prize money and ranking points ==
For 2012, the prize purse is $150,000. The prize money and points breakdown is as follows:

Prize money Hong Kong Open (2012)
Event	W	F	SF	QF	2R	1R
Points (PSA)	2625	1725	1050	640	375	190
Prize money	$23,625	$15,525	$9,450	$5,740	$3,375	$1,690

== Seeds ==
1. (England) James Willstrop (final)
2. (England) Nick Matthew (semi-finals)
3. (France) Grégory Gaultier (quarter-finals)
4. (Egypt) Karim Darwish (semi-finals)
5. (Egypt) Ramy Ashour (champion)
6. (England) Peter Barker (quarter-finals)
7. (Egypt) Amr Shabana (quarter-finals)
8. (Egypt) Mohamed El Shorbagy (second round)

== Draw and results ==
First round
1	(England) James Willstrop	5	11	11	11
(England) Adrian Grant	11	8	3	8
(Malaysia) Ong Beng Hee	9	11	11	8	11
(Colombia) Miguel Á. Rodríguez	11	5	9	11	5
(Spain) Borja Golán	11	11	11
Q	(England) Joe Lee	7	5	2
Q	(Australia) Ryan Cuskelly	8	5	12
8	(Egypt) Mohd El Shorbagy	11	11	14
6	(England) Peter Barker	7	11	11	11
Q	(Egypt) Karim Abdel Gawad	11	6	5	6
(Australia) Cameron Pilley	11	11	10	5	11
Q	(England) Chris Simpson	8	8	12	11	8
(England) Daryl Selby	9	11	11	8	11
(Botswana) Alister Walker	11	8	8	11	8
WC	(Hong Kong) Leo Au	10	6	9
4	(Egypt) Karim Darwish	12	11	11
3	(France) Grégory Gaultier	11	11	11
Q	(France) Grégoire Marche	5	5	5
(Switzerland) Nicolas Müller	11	11	11
Q	(England) Adrian Waller	9	7	7
(India) Saurav Ghosal	11	11	11
Q	(Hong Kong) Max Lee	3	5	4
(Egypt) Tarek Momen	7	8	2
5	(Egypt) Ramy Ashour	11	11	11
7	(Egypt) Amr Shabana	11	11	11
Q	(France) Mathieu Castagnet	9	7	7
(England) Tom Richards	11	11	7	11
(Finland) Olli Tuominen	7	7	11	2
(South Africa) Steve Coppinger	8	14	11	11
(Egypt) Omar Mosaad	11	12	8	9
(Germany) Simon Rösner	10	10	6
2	(England) Nick Matthew	11	11	11

Second round
1	(England) James Willstrop	11	11	11
(Malaysia) Ong Beng Hee	8	9	7
(Spain) Borja Golán	11	11	8	11
8	(Egypt) Mohd El Shorbagy	6	9	11	9
6	(England) Peter Barker	13	11	11
(Australia) Cameron Pilley	11	8	8
(England) Daryl Selby	11	4	10	6
4	(Egypt) Karim Darwish	6	11	12	11
3	(France) Grégory Gaultier	11	11	11
(Switzerland) Nicolas Müller	4	5	5
(India) Saurav Ghosal	7	5	12	10
5	(Egypt) Ramy Ashour	11	11	10	12
7	(Egypt) Amr Shabana	10	10	11	11	11
(England) Tom Richards	12	12	7	7	7
(South Africa) Steve Coppinger	6	6	8
2	(England) Nick Matthew	11	11	11

Quarter finals
1	(England) James Willstrop	11	11	11
(Spain) Borja Golán	7	7	4
6	(England) Peter Barker	wo
4	(Egypt) Karim Darwish
3	(France) Grégory Gaultier	11	8	8	3
5	(Egypt) Ramy Ashour	8	11	11	10
7	(Egypt) Amr Shabana	wo
2	(England) Nick Matthew

Semi-finals
1	(England) James Willstrop	11	11	11
4	(Egypt) Karim Darwish	8	5	9
Final
1	(England) James Willstrop	8	11	7	6
5	(Egypt) Ramy Ashour	11	3	11	11
5	(Egypt) Ramy Ashour	11	11	13
2	(England) Nick Matthew	9	9	11

== See also ==
- Hong Kong Open (squash)
- Women's Hong Kong squash Open 2012
- 2012 Men's World Open Squash Championship
- PSA World Tour 2012
- PSA World Series

Preceded by US Open; United States (Philadelphia); 2012	PSA World Series 2012; Hong Kong Squash Open; Hong Kong; 2012	Succeeded by World Championship; Qatar (Doha); 2012
