= Men's United States Open (squash) 2012 =

US Open 2012
- 25th PSA U.S. Open

Details
- Event name: Delaware Investments United States Open 2012
- Location: (United States) Philadelphia, Pennsylvania
- Venue: Daskalakis Athletic Center
- Website www.usopensquash.com/philadelphia/

Men's Winner
- Category: World Series Gold
- Prize money: $115,000
- Year: World Tour 2012

The Men's United States Squash Open 2012 was the men's edition of the 2012 United States Open (squash), which is a PSA World Series event Gold (Prize money: $115,000). The event took place at the Daskalakis Athletic Center in Philadelphia, Pennsylvania in the United States from 6 October to 12 October. Ramy Ashour won his first US Open trophy, beating Grégory Gaultier in the final.

== Prize money and ranking points ==
For 2012, the prize purse was $115,000. The prize money and points breakdown is as follows:

Prize Money US Open (2012)
Event	W	F	SF	QF	2R	1R
Points (PSA)	2015	1325	805	490	290	145
Prize money	$17,500	$11,500	$7,000	$4,250	$2,500	$1,250

== Seeds ==
1. (England) James Willstrop (Semifinals)
2. (England) Nick Matthew (Semifinals)
3. (France) Grégory Gaultier (Final)
4. (Egypt) Ramy Ashour (Champion)
5. (Egypt) Karim Darwish (Quarterfinals)
6. (England) Peter Barker (Quarterfinals)
7. (Egypt) Amr Shabana (Quarterfinals)
8. (Egypt) Mohamed El Shorbagy (Quarterfinals)

== Draw and results ==
1* 2* First round 3* 4*
1	(England) James Willstrop	11	11	7	11
(Botswana) Alister Walker	4	3	11	9
(England) Daryl Selby	11	11	12
Q	(Egypt) Omar Abdel Aziz	5	9	10
(Australia) Cameron Pilley	11	11	11
Q	(South Africa) Stephen Coppinger	0	5	5
(Germany) Simon Rösner	7	11	9	7
8	(Egypt) Mohd El Shorbagy	11	6	11	11
5	(Egypt) Karim Darwish	13	11	11
Q	(Hong Kong) Max Lee	11	2	9
(Egypt) Hisham Ashour	9	11	11	11	6
WC	(United States) Christopher Gordon	11	8	13	5	11
(Spain) Borja Golán	8	11	11	11
Q	(England) Joe Lee	11	9	6	5
(Finland) Olli Tuominen	1	2	3
3	(France) Grégory Gaultier	11	11	11
4	(Egypt) Ramy Ashour	11	13	11
(India) Saurav Ghosal	7	11	8
(Egypt) Tarek Momen	5	11	10	12	11
(Switzerland) Nicolas Müller	11	7	12	10	6
(England) Tom Richards	11	11	10	11
(Malaysia) Ong Beng Hee	6	3	12	6
Q	(Canada) Shahier Razik	4	6	1
6	(England) Peter Barker	11	11	11
7	(Egypt) Amr Shabana	11	11	15
Q	(Colombia) Miguel Á. Rodríguez	9	6	13
(Netherlands) Laurens Jan Anjema	11	11	11
Q	(Pakistan) Aamir Atlas Khan	5	7	9
(England) Adrian Grant	11	8	11	5	11
Q	(Egypt) Karim Abdel Gawad	9	11	1	11	9
(Egypt) Omar Mosaad	11	7	5	9
2	(England) Nick Matthew	7	11	11	11

* Second round *
1	(England) James Willstrop	9	11	12	11
(England) Daryl Selby	11	4	10	5
(Australia) Cameron Pilley	12	8	10	12	4
8	(Egypt) Mohd El Shorbagy	10	11	12	10	11
5	(Egypt) Karim Darwish	11	11	11
WC	(United States) Christopher Gordon	4	3	8
(Spain) Borja Golán	7	4	7
3	(France) Grégory Gaultier	11	11	11
4	(Egypt) Ramy Ashour	13	11	11
(Egypt) Tarek Momen	11	7	8
(England) Tom Richards	5	7	8
6	(England) Peter Barker	11	11	11
7	(Egypt) Amr Shabana	9	11	11	11
(Netherlands) Laurens Jan Anjema	11	7	1	5
(England) Adrian Grant	11	7	8
2	(England) Nick Matthew	13	11	11

* Quarter finals
1	(England) James Willstrop	11	7	12	8	11
8	(Egypt) Mohd El Shorbagy	6	11	10	11	5
5	(Egypt) Karim Darwish	11	5	5	4
3	(France) Grégory Gaultier	6	11	11	11
4	(Egypt) Ramy Ashour *	10	11	11	7	13
6	(England) Peter Barker	12	5	6	11	11
7	(Egypt) Amr Shabana	6	11	12	9	9
2	(England) Nick Matthew *	11	4	10	11	11

Semi finals *
1	(England) James Willstrop	7	2	8
3	(France) Grégory Gaultier	11	11	11
Final
3	(France) Grégory Gaultier	4	9	9
4	(Egypt) Ramy Ashour *	11	11	11
4	(Egypt) Ramy Ashour	15	8	11	11
2	(England) Nick Matthew	13	11	8	7

== See also ==
- United States Open (squash)
- PSA World Series 2012
- Women's United States Open (squash) 2012

Preceded by British Open; England (London); 2012	PSA World Series 2012; United States Open; United States (Philadelphia); 2012	Succeeded by Hong Kong Open; Hong Kong; 2012
