= 2012 Men's British Open Squash Championship =

Squash tournament

British Open
- 72nd Men's British Open

Details
- Event name: Allam British Open 2012
- Location: (United Kingdom) London, England
- Venue: The O2 (London)
- Dates: 14–20 May 2012
- Website www.britishopensquash.net

Men's Winner
- Category: World Series Platinum
- Prize money: $150,000
- Year: World Tour 2012

The Men's Allam British Open 2012 is the men's edition of the 2012 British Open Squash Championships, which is a PSA World Series event Platinum (Prize money : $150 000 ). The event took place at the O2 in London, England from 14–20 May 2012. Nick Matthew won his third British Open trophy, beating Ramy Ashour in the final.

== Prize money and ranking points ==
For 2012, the prize purse was $150,000. The prize money and points breakdown is as follows:

Prize Money British Open (2012)
Event	W	F	SF	QF	2R	1R
Points (PSA)	2625	1725	1050	640	375	190
Prize money	$23,625	$15,525	$9,450	$5,740	$3,375	$1,690

== Seeds ==
1. (England) James Willstrop (Semifinals)
2. (France) Grégory Gaultier (Quarterfinals)
3. (England) Nick Matthew (Champion)
4. (Egypt) Ramy Ashour (Final)
5. (Egypt) Amr Shabana (Quarterfinals)
6. (England) Peter Barker (Semifinals)
7. (Egypt) Mohamed El Shorbagy (Quarterfinals)
8. (Netherlands) Laurens Jan Anjema (Quarterfinals)

== Draw and results ==
1* 2* First round 3* 4*
1	(England) James Willstrop	11	11	11
(Germany) Simon Rösner	3	5	7
(Botswana) Alister Walker	11	11	11
Q	(England) Chris Simpson	7	6	7
(England) Adrian Grant	11	11	11
WC	(England) Adrian Waller	6	8	5
Q	(France) Mathieu Castagnet	7	11	7	10
7	(Egypt) Mohd El Shorbagy	11	9	11	11
5	(Egypt) Amr Shabana	11	7	6	11	11
(Egypt) Tarek Momen	7	11	11	3	6
(Egypt) Mohd Ali Anwar Reda	6	10	6
(Finland) Olli Tuominen	11	12	11
(Spain) Borja Golán	12	12	11
(Australia) Cameron Pilley	10	10	5
(England) Daryl Selby	11	7	5	14
4	(Egypt) Ramy Ashour	8	11	11	16
3	(England) Nick Matthew	11	11	11
Q	(Hong Kong) Max Lee	8	4	6
(England) Tom Richards	11	10	11	11
(Malaysia) Ong Beng Hee	7	12	4	4
(South Africa) Stephen Coppinger	11	11	11	11
Q	(Scotland) Alan Clyne	9	13	6	3
Q	(France) Grégoire Marche	2	1	5
8	(Netherlands) Laurens Jan Anjema	11	11	11
6	(England) Peter Barker	11	11	11
Q	(Australia) Ryan Cuskelly	3	9	9
(India) Saurav Ghosal	11	11	11
Q	(Egypt) Marwan El Shorbagy	7	6	5
(Colombia) Miguel Rodríguez	5	6	11	11	1
(England) Jonathan Kemp	11	11	8	9	11
(Switzerland) Nicolas Müller	6	4	3
2	(France) Grégory Gaultier	11	11	11

1* 2* Second round 3* 4*
1	(England) James Willstrop	9	11	11	11
(Botswana) Alister Walker	11	7	5	5
(England) Adrian Grant	10	4	8
7	(Egypt) Mohd El Shorbagy	11	11	11
5	(Egypt) Amr Shabana	11	11	11
(Finland) Olli Tuominen	10	4	4
(Spain) Borja Golán	11	11	9	1	6
4	(Egypt) Ramy Ashour*	6	3	11	11	11
3	(England) Nick Matthew	11	8	11	11
(England) Tom Richards	5	11	4	6
(South Africa) Stephen Coppinger	10	11	2	3
8	(Netherlands) Laurens Jan Anjema	12	2	11	11
6	(England) Peter Barker	7	11	11	11
(India) Saurav Ghosal	11	2	6	6
Q	(England) Jonathan Kemp	5	8	7
2	(France) Grégory Gaultier	11	11	11

* Quarter finals *
1	(England) James Willstrop	11	11	11
7	(Egypt) Mohd El Shorbagy	4	7	9
5	(Egypt) Amr Shabana	8	10	11	11	4
4	(Egypt) Ramy Ashour	11	12	5	1	11
3	(England) Nick Matthew	4	11	11	11
8	(Netherlands) Laurens Jan Anjema	11	6	5	5
6	(England) Peter Barker	11	2	7	11	11
2	(France) Grégory Gaultier	8	11	11	9	6

Semi finals
1	(England) James Willstrop	11	6	6	8
4	(Egypt) Ramy Ashour*	8	11	11	11
Final
4	(Egypt) Ramy Ashour	9	4	8
3	(England) Nick Matthew*	11	11	11
3	(England) Nick Matthew	11	11	11
6	(England) Peter Barker	5	8	6

== See also ==
- 2012 Men's World Open Squash Championship
- 2012 Women's British Open Squash Championship

Preceded by El Gouna International; Egypt (El Gouna); 2012	PSA World Series 2012; British Open; England (London); 2012	Succeeded by US Open; USA (Philadelphia); 2012
