= 2012 Men's World Open Squash Championship =

Men's World Championship 2012
- 34th PSA World Squash Championship
- Location: Doha, Qatar
- Venue: Aspire Academy
- Date: December 7–14, 2012
- Website squashsite.co.uk/worldsquashchamps

PSA World Tour
- Category: PSA World Championship
- Prize money: $325,000

Results
- Champion: (Egypt) Ramy Ashour
- Runner-up: (Egypt) Mohamed El Shorbagy
- Semi-finalists: (England) James Willstrop (England) Nick Matthew

The 2012 Men's World Open Squash Championship is the men's edition of the 2012 World Championship, which serves as the individual world championship for squash players. The event took place in Doha in Qatar from 7-14 December 2012. Ramy Ashour won his second World Championship title, defeating Mohamed El Shorbagy in the final.

== Prize money and ranking points ==
For 2012, the prize purse was $ 325,000. The prize money and points breakdown is as follows:

Prize Money World Championship (2012)
Event	W	F	SF	QF	3R	2R	1R
Points (PSA)	2890	1900	1155	700	410	205	125
Prize money	$ 48,000	$ 30,000	$ 18,000	$ 10,500	$ 6,000	$ 3,000	$ 1,500

== Seeds ==
1. (England) James Willstrop (semifinals)
2. (England) Nick Matthew (semifinals)
3. (France) Grégory Gaultier (quarterfinals)
4. (Egypt) Karim Darwish (quarterfinals)
5. (Egypt) Ramy Ashour (champion)
6. (England) Peter Barker (third round)
7. (Egypt) Amr Shabana (quarterfinals)
8. (Egypt) Mohamed El Shorbagy (final)
9. (Netherlands) Laurens Jan Anjema (second round)
10. (Egypt) Omar Mosaad (third round)
11. (England) Daryl Selby (third round)
12. (Botswana) Alister Walker (third round)
13. (Egypt) Tarek Momen (third round)
14. (England) Tom Richards (first round)
15. (Spain) Borja Golán (quarterfinals)
16. (Australia) Cameron Pilley (third round)

== Draw and results ==
Poster of Men's World Championship 2012

=== Finals ===
* Quarter finals
1	(England) James Willstrop	11	11	11
15	(Spain) Borja Golán	7	7	5
8	(Egypt) Mohd El Shorbagy	11	12	11
4	(Egypt) Karim Darwish	9	10	9
3	(France) Grégory Gaultier	10	12	6	11	3
5	(Egypt) Ramy Ashour *	12	10	11	9	11
7	(Egypt) Amr Shabana	5	11	5	5
2	(England) Nick Matthew *	11	9	11	11

Semi finals
1	(England) James Willstrop	9	11	12	11	8
8	(Egypt) Mohd El Shorbagy*	11	9	14	4	11
5	(Egypt) Ramy Ashour *	11	11	9	11
2	(England) Nick Matthew	9	5	11	8

Final
8	(Egypt) Mohamed El Shorbagy	11	6	5	11	8
5	(Egypt) Ramy Ashour *	2	11	11	9	11

=== Top half ===
==== Section 1 ====
First round
1	(England) James Willstrop	7	11	11	11
(England) Chris Ryder	11	5	3	2
(England) Adrian Waller	10	11	7	10
(Canada) Shawn Delierre	12	8	11	12
(India) Saurav Ghosal	11	11	11
WC	(Qatar) Abdulla Al Tamimi	5	4	9
(Egypt) Karim Abdel Gawad	9	11	4	11	11
14	(England) Tom Richards	11	6	11	5	7
15	(Spain) Borja Golán	11	11	11
Q	(Denmark) Kristian Frost Olesen	6	4	6
(Scotland) Alan Clyne	9	11	11	11
Q	(England) Charles Sharpes	11	5	1	6
(France) Mathieu Castagnet	11	7	14	8	11
Q	(Egypt) Karim Ali Fathi	7	11	12	11	8
(New Zealand) Martin Knight	5	2	3
6	(England) Peter Barker	11	11	11

Second round
1	(England) James Willstrop	11	11	11
(Canada) Shawn Delierre	2	1	7
(India) Saurav Ghosal	11	11	6
(Egypt) Karim Abdel Gawad	4	8	1
15	(Spain) Borja Golán	11	11	11
(Scotland) Alan Clyne	7	7	7
(France) Mathieu Castagnet	11	6	11	4
6	(England) Peter Barker	2	11	13	11

Third round
1	(England) James Willstrop	11	11	11
(India) Saurav Ghosal	6	7	2
15	(Spain) Borja Golán	11	4	11	11
6	(England) Peter Barker	4	11	3	3

Quarter finals
1	(England) James Willstrop	11	11	11
15	(Spain) Borja Golán	7	7	5

==== Section 2 ====
First round
8	(Egypt) Mohd El Shorbagy	11	11	10	11
(Egypt) Mohd Ali Anwar Reda	8	9	12	5
(France) Grégoire Marche	11	9	11	11
Q	(Egypt) Mohd Abouelghar	2	11	6	6
(Malaysia) Ong Beng Hee	11	3	4	7
(Malaysia) Mohd Nafi. Adnan	6	11	11	11
Q	(England) Oliver Pett	11	8	2	4
16	(Australia) Cameron Pilley	8	11	11	11
11	(England) Daryl Selby	12	11	11
(Finland) Olli Tuominen	10	4	9
(United States) Julian Illingworth	11	13	7	4
Q	(Egypt) Omar Abdel Meguid	8	15	11	11
(India) Siddharth Suchde	4	3	5
(Germany) Simon Rösner	11	11	11
Q	(Hungary) Márk Krajcsák	5	3	3
4	(Egypt) Karim Darwish	11	11	11

Second round
8	(Egypt) Mohd El Shorbagy	11	11	12
(France) Grégoire Marche	3	9	10
(Malaysia) Mohd Nafi. Adnan	3	8	5
16	(Australia) Cameron Pilley	11	11	11
11	(England) Daryl Selby	11	11	11
Q	(Egypt) Omar Abdel Meguid	8	9	3
(Germany) Simon Rösner	5	5	4
4	(Egypt) Karim Darwish	11	11	11

Third round
8	(Egypt) Mohd El Shorbagy	11	11	11	11
16	(Australia) Cameron Pilley	13	6	2	7
11	(England) Daryl Selby	9	11	12	9
4	(Egypt) Karim Darwish	11	13	10	11

Quarter finals
8	(Egypt) Mohd El Shorbagy	11	12	11
4	(Egypt) Karim Darwish	9	10	9

=== Bottom half ===
==== Section 1 ====
First round
3	(France) Grégory Gaultier	11	11	11
(Egypt) Mohammed Abbas	5	5	1
(Colombia) Miguel Á. Rodríguez	11	11	5	11
Q	(Kuwait) Abdullah Al Muzayen	3	8	11	6
(England) Chris Simpson	11	11	11
Q	(Australia) Matthew Karwalski	8	5	8
(England) Jonathan Kemp	7	2	4
9	(Netherlands) Laurens Jan Anjema	11	11	11
10	(Egypt) Omar Mosaad	12	11	11	11
Q	(England) Robbie Temple	14	9	5	6
(Hong Kong) Max Lee	8	11	13	11
(Finland) Henrik Mustonen	11	8	11	7
(England) Adrian Grant	11	7	11	11
Q	(Australia) Rex Hedrick	5	11	8	8
(Egypt) Marwan El Shorbagy	7	10	8
5	(Egypt) Ramy Ashour	11	12	11

Second round
3	(France) Grégory Gaultier	11	11	11
(Colombia) Miguel Á. Rodríguez	9	7	9
(England) Chris Simpson	11	8	11	9	11
9	(Netherlands) Laurens Jan Anjema	4	11	7	11	9
10	(Egypt) Omar Mosaad	11	11	11
(Hong Kong) Max Lee	9	5	4
(England) Adrian Grant	6	2	9
5	(Egypt) Ramy Ashour	11	11	11

Third round
3	(France) Grégory Gaultier	11	11	11
(England) Chris Simpson	7	6	4
10	(Egypt) Omar Mosaad	13	10	2	12
5	(Egypt) Ramy Ashour	11	12	11	14

Quarter finals
3	(France) Grégory Gaultier	10	12	6	11	3
5	(Egypt) Ramy Ashour	12	10	11	9	11

==== Section 2 ====
First round
7	(Egypt) Amr Shabana	11	11	11
Q	(Malaysia) Ivan Yuen	6	4	9
(Pakistan) Aamir Atlas Khan	6	22	6
Q	(England) Joe Lee	11	24	11
(Canada) Shahier Razik	6	1
Q	(South Africa) Shaun Le Roux	11	11
(Egypt) Omar Abdel Aziz	7	3
12	(Botswana) Alister Walker	11	11
13	(Egypt) Tarek Momen	11	7	4	11	11
(South Africa) Stephen Coppinger	7	11	11	8	8
(Australia) Ryan Cuskelly	13	11	11
Q	(England) Jaymie Haycocks	11	6	3
(Australia) Zac Alexander	11	8	5	13	14
Q	(Wales) Peter Creed	9	11	11	11	12
(Switzerland) Nicolas Müller	8	6	4
2	(England) Nick Matthew	11	11	11

Second round
7	(Egypt) Amr Shabana	11	11	11
Q	(England) Joe Lee	5	2	4
Q	(South Africa) Shaun Le Roux	9	6	5
12	(Botswana) Alister Walker	11	11	11
13	(Egypt) Tarek Momen	11	11	11
(Australia) Ryan Cuskelly	6	8	6
(Australia) Zac Alexander	11	5	5	5
2	(England) Nick Matthew	8	11	11	11

Third round
7	(Egypt) Amr Shabana	11	9
11	(Botswana) Alister Walker	4	3
13	(Egypt) Tarek Momen	8	9	11
2	(England) Nick Matthew	11	11	11

Quarter finals
7	(Egypt) Amr Shabana	5	11	5	5
2	(England) Nick Matthew	11	9	11	11

Preceded by Netherlands (Rotterdam); 2011	PSA World Championship; Qatar (Doha); 2012	Succeeded by England (Manchester); 2013
Preceded by Hong Kong Squash Open; Hong Kong; 2012	PSA World Series 2012; World Championship; Qatar (Doha); 2012	Succeeded by Tournament of Champions; United States (New York) 2013
