= Ramy Ashour =

Egyptian squash player (born 1987)

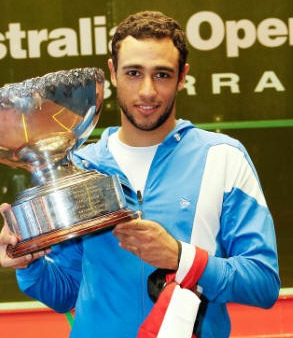
- Ramy Ashour with his 2011 Australian Open

Personal information
- Native name: رَامِي عَاشُور
- Full name: Ramy Mohamed Ashour
- Nicknames: The Maverick, The Artist, The Magician
- Born: September 30, 1987 (age 39) Cairo, Egypt
- Height: 1.80 m (5 ft 11 in)
- Weight: 78 kg (172 lb)

Sport
- Country: Egypt
- Handedness: Right handed
- Turned pro: 2006
- Coached by: Hisham Ashour (Ramy’s older brother)
- Retired: April 22, 2019
- Racquet used: Prince Textreme Pro Warrior 600

Men's singles
- Highest ranking: No. 1 (January 2010)
- Title: 40
- Tour final: 55
- World Open: W (2008, 2012, 2014)
Medal record
Men's squash
Representing Egypt
World Championships
Gold medal – first place	2008 Manchester	Singles
Silver medal – second place	2009 Kuwait	Singles
Gold medal – first place	2012 Doha	Singles
Bronze medal – third place	2013 Manchester	Singles
Gold medal – first place	2014 Doha	Singles
Silver medal – second place	2016 Cairo	Singles
World Team Championships
Gold medal – first place	2009 Odense	Team
Gold medal – first place	2011 Paderborn	Team
Silver medal – second place	2013 Mulhouse	Team
Gold medal – first place	2017 Marseille	Team

Ramy Mohamed Ashour (Arabic: رَامِي مُحَمَّد عَاشُور; born September 30, 1987) is a retired professional squash player from Egypt. Widely considered as one of the greatest squash players of all time, having won three World titles in 2008, 2012 and 2014. He became the youngest player to reach number one in the world since the 1980s, as well as the first ever two-time World Junior Squash Champion.

== Career overview ==
Ashour won his first major international title in 2004 at the age of 16, becoming the youngest player ever to win the Men's World Junior Squash Championship. The same year, he helped lead Egypt to a second-place finish in the team event, behind Pakistan. In July 2006, he became the first player in history to win the World Junior Championships for the second time, defeating fellow Egyptian Omar Mosaad. He also led Egypt to a 2–1 victory over Pakistan in the final of the team event; the Egyptian team captured the top three positions in the individual players' event as well as the team event title, a feat no other team had ever accomplished.

In the same year he transitioned out of the junior division, Ashour reached his first major final at the Cathay Pacific Swiss Privilege Hong Kong Squash Open in 2006, where he lost to fellow Egyptian, Amr Shabana, who later would attain the number one ranking in the world. En route to the final, Ashour defeated world number 10 John White, world number 3 Thierry Lincou, and world number 2 David Palmer.

Ashour won his first major professional title in January 2007, by defeating Palmer in 32 minutes (11–7, 11–3, 11–4), in the final of the Canadian Squash Classic. In April 2007, Ashour won the Kuwait Open, the richest squash event in the world, by defeating Amr Shabana, 11–5, 11–3, 12–10, in 34 minutes, after facing a 10–6 deficit in the third set. He then won the Qatar Classic in Doha by again downing David Palmer, this time with a score of 8–11, 11–9, 11–9, 11–6, in 66 minutes. Also in 2007, Ashour was invited to the ATCO World Series Squash Finals event, where he competed against the other seven top points earners of the season. The only player to go undefeated in all of his first three matches, he played French sensation Grégory Gaultier in the final. After a 62-minute battle, Ashour took the title 3–1 (12–10, 11–8, 4–11, 11–4).

According to squash legend and writer Malcolm Willstrop, "Ramy Ashour is something else — his movement is better than anyone in the game, and allied to his unique racket skills and vision, he lights up the sport. Not only that, but his modesty and engaging smile make him a rare commodity."

Ashour played Nick Matthew at the 2009 Saudi International Open, the outcome of which would determine not only the winner of the championship but also the next world number one. He won the match, his longest ever on the PSA tour, in a gruelling 110-minute, 5-game battle.

After losing his world number one ranking to his English rival, Nick Matthew, in June 2010, Ashour reached the final of the new PSA World Series Australian Open in August. Two weeks later, he battled to a 10–12, 11–9, 11–9, 9–11, 11–9 victory in a 90-minute match against Gaultier in the Hong Kong Open final. The back-to-back victories returned Ashour to the top of the rankings in September 2010.

He slipped behind Matthew again in early 2011, but Ashour then won the JP Morgan Tournament of Champions title for the second time since 2008, beating Matthew in the final match. This was his comeback tournament after recovering from a 2010 hamstring injury. A month later, Ashour played in a PSA World Series final at the North American Open in Virginia, losing to Matthew in a five-game match. At the 2011 Australian Open, Ashour beat Matthew, the tournament's defending champion, in another five-game match. The rivalry between the Egyptian and the Englishman continued when both played for their country in the WSF 2011 Men's World Team Squash Championships in Paderborn, Germany. Ashour (and Egypt) went on to win that encounter. Ashour furthered his attempt toward reclaiming his world number one ranking by defeating Matthew once more at the 2011 Rowe British Grand Prix, winning the match 3 games to 1.

Ashour's 2012 campaign was arguably the most successful of his career, becoming the first player to make the final of every tournament in which he competed since Jansher Khan. After coming back from a long injury break in February 2012, Ashour made the final at the North American Open 2012, where he lost to the new world number one, James Willstrop. At the El Gouna International in April, Ashour won their rematch, collecting another major title in front of his home crowd after Willstrop pulled out of the final in the third game. At the Allam British Open in May, Ashour missed the opportunity to be the first Egyptian title holder, after Abou Taleb in 1966, by losing to his old rival and defending champion Matthew. Ashour then went undefeated in the second half of 2012, winning all four tournaments in which he took part. Specifically, he defended his Australian Open title in August, won the US Open title in October by defeating Grégory Gaultier, and took the Hong Kong Open title in November by beating Willstrop. This string of wins led up to his final victory of the year at the 2012 Men's World Open Squash Championship in December. By beating Matthew in the semi-final, he would reclaim the world number one spot the following January, and by defeating his fellow countryman, Mohamed El Shorbagy, in the final after a gruelling five-game match, he gathered his second World Open title.

Although he did not play in the ATCO World Series final because of a hamstring injury sustained at the Qatar World Open, Ashour retained the world number one ranking at the first world series event in 2013, the J.P. Morgan Tournament of Champions. With his right leg heavily strapped, Ashour made it to the final, where he recovered from a 2–0 deficit against Gaultier to stage an unlikely comeback. By claiming another TOC title after his previous one in 2011, he became only the third player to win the prestigious PSA series title thrice since Peter Nicol did it in 2004. Ashour added two PSA world tour titles to his resume within two weeks. He beat his long running rivals, Willstrop and Matthew, in the semi-final and final of the North American Open in Richmond, Virginia, claiming his second North American Open title. Twelve days later, Ashour won his 30th tour title by taking the Kuwait PSA Cup (formerly the Kuwait Open). He defeated defending champion Willstrop in the final, and extended his run of consecutive major PSA titles to seven. In May, Ashour clinched his first British Open championship, becoming the first Egyptian to win the tournament since Abou Taleb in 1966. He also extended his unbeaten run to 41 matches, with his last previous loss taking place at the 2012 British Open final in London, exactly a year previously. After the summer break, Ashour won his ninth PSA World Tour title in a row and extended his unbeaten tour run to 45 matches by taking down defending champion Grégory Gaultier in the Netsuite Open final.

On November 21, 2014, Ashour won his third world title when he defeated fellow Egyptian Mohamad El-Shorbagy at the Squash World Championship in Doha, in a match that was described as "epic."

An unfortunate turn of events left Ashour plagued with a chronic hamstring problem at the peak of his career. It almost certainly had an impact on his trophy cabinet, but Ashour himself took a characteristically philosophical approach to his injury, demonstrated in his various social media posts on the issue - citing his mental battle and desire for a full recovery. The injury itself came just after his 40+ match winning streak, which was defined by his fast-paced rallies, reaction volleying and a unique insight into rally construction.

Ashour was known for his unique playing style, often referred to as 'The Artist'; he was regarded by many, to be one of the most naturally gifted players to ever play the game. Mohamed El Shorbagy, the 2017 world champion, once commented after losing in two world finals to him, as Ashour being 'the best of the best'; Jonah Barrington, also one of the Squash greats, ranks him as equal to Pakistani legends Jahangir Khan and Jansher Khan who dominated the game in the 1980s and 1990s.

On April 22, 2019, at the age of 31, Ashour announced his retirement from professional Squash.

== World Open final appearances ==
=== 3 titles & 2 runner-up ===
Outcome	Year	Location	Opponent in the final	Score in the final
Winner	2008	Manchester, England	(Egypt) Karim Darwish	5–11, 11–8, 11–4, 11–5
Runner-up	2009	Kuwait	(Egypt) Amr Shabana	11–8, 11–5, 11–5
Winner	2012	Doha, Qatar	(Egypt) Mohamed El Shorbagy	2–11, 11–6, 11–5, 9–11, 11–8
Winner	2014	Doha, Qatar	(Egypt) Mohamed El Shorbagy	13–11, 7–11, 5–11, 11–5, 14–12
Runner-up	2016	Cairo, Egypt	(Egypt) Karim Abdel Gawad	5–11, 11–6, 11–7, 2-1 (retired)

== Major World Series final appearances ==
=== British Open: 3 finals (1 title, 2 runner-up) ===
Outcome	Year	Opponent in the final	Score in the final
Runner-up	2012	(England) Nick Matthew	11–9, 11–4, 11–8
Winner	2013	(France) Grégory Gaultier	7–11, 11–4, 11–7, 11–8
Runner-up	2016	(Egypt) Mohamed El Shorbagy	11–2, 11–5, 11–9

=== Hong Kong Open: 4 finals (3 titles, 1 runner-up) ===
Outcome	Year	Opponent in the final	Score in the final
Runner-up	2006	(Egypt) Amr Shabana	13–11, 3–11, 11–5, 13–11
Winner	2010	(France) Grégory Gaultier	10–12, 11–9, 11–9, 9–11, 11–9
Winner	2012	(England) James Willstrop	11–8, 3–11, 11–7, 11–6
Winner	2016	(Egypt) Karim Abdel Gawad	11–9, 8–11, 11–6, 5–11, 11–6

=== Qatar Classic: 1 final (1 title, 0 runner-up) ===
Outcome	Year	Opponent in the final	Score in the final
Winner	2007	(Australia) David Palmer	8–11, 11–9, 11–9, 11–6

=== US Open: 2 finals (1 title, 1 runner-up) ===
Outcome	Year	Opponent in the final	Score in the final
Runner-up	2009	(Egypt) Amr Shabana	11–7, 11–2, 7–11, 12–14, 11–8
Winner	2012	(France) Grégory Gaultier	11–4, 11–9, 11–9

== Career statistics ==
Listed below.

=== PSA titles (40) ===
All Results for Ramy Ashour in PSA World's Tour tournament

Legend PSA Platinum Series / PSA Series Final / PSA World Open (16) PSA Gold Series (4) PSA Silver Series (6) PSA Star Series (5) PSA Super Satellite (0) PSA Satellite (1)	Titles by Major Tournaments World Open (3) Hong Kong Open (3) British Open (1) Qatar Classic (1) Kuwait Open (3) US Open (1) Tournament of Champions (3)

No.	Date	Tournament	Opponent in Final	Score in Final	Minutes Played
1.	November 21, 2004	Athens Open	(England) Andrew Whipp	13–11, 12–10, 7–11, 7–11, 11–9	1 h 15 min
2.	January 12, 2007	Canadian Classic	(Australia) David Palmer	11–7, 11–3, 11–4	32 min
3.	January 29, 2007	Dayton Open	(Scotland) John White	8–11, 7–11, 11–6, 12–10, 11–2	1 h 12 min
4.	April 11, 2007	Sheikha Al Saad Kuwait Open	(Egypt) Amr Shabana	11–5, 11–3, 12–10	34 min
5.	April 17, 2007	Qatar Classic Open	(Australia) David Palmer	8–11, 11–9, 11–9, 11–6	1 h 9 min
6.	August 12, 2007	Super Series Finals	(France) Grégory Gaultier	12–10, 11–8, 4–11, 11–4	1 h 2 min
7.	January 16, 2008	Tournament of Champions	(England) James Willstrop	11–7, 13–11, 11–9	40 min
8.	February 16, 2008	Canadian Classic	(Egypt) Amr Shabana	11–2, 11–9, 8–11, 11–8	38 min
9.	April 20, 2008	Hurghada International	(Egypt) Amr Shabana	12–10, 9–11, 11–7, 9–11, 12–10	47 min
10.	October 19, 2008	World Open	(Egypt) Karim Darwish	5–11, 11–8, 11–4, 11–5	1 h
11.	February 28, 2009	North American Open	(England) Nick Matthew	11–8, 13–11, 10–12, 5–11, 11–8	1 h 31 min
12.	April 4, 2009	Hurghada International	(France) Grégory Gaultier	7–11, 11–5, 11–3, 11–8	47 min
13.	December 10, 2009	PSA Masters	(England) Nick Matthew	11–6, 9–11, 11–9, 11–9	1 h 19 min
14.	December 18, 2009	Saudi International Open	(England) Nick Matthew	11–7, 7–11, 11–9, 9–11, 11–8	1 h 50 min
15.	March 20, 2010	CIMB KL Open	(Egypt) Karim Darwish	11–8, 11–8, 11–9	51 min
16.	August 29, 2010	Cathay Pacific Hong Kong Open	(France) Grégory Gaultier	10–12, 11–9, 11–9, 9–11, 11–9	1 h 30 min
17.	September 20, 2010	Rowe British Grand Prix	(England) James Willstrop	11–7, 3–11, 11–3, 11–5	40 min
18.	November 2, 2010	Kuwait Open	(Egypt) Amr Shabana	9–11, 11–4, 13–11, 11–1	45 min
19.	January 27, 2011	Tournament of Champions	(England) Nick Matthew	11–3, 7–11, 11–9, 11–7	52 min
20.	May 19, 2011	Hurghada International	(Egypt) Karim Darwish	11–9, 9–11, 12–14, 11–9, 11–3	1 h 20 min
21.	August 14, 2011	Australian Open	(England) Nick Matthew	12–14, 11–6, 10–12, 11–8, 11–4	1h 17 min
22.	September 25, 2011	Rowe British Grand Prix	(England) Nick Matthew	1–11, 11–3, 11–7, 11–4	1h 6 min
23.	April 13, 2012	El Gouna International	(England) James Willstrop	12–10, 11–5, 5-2 (ret)	37 min
24.	August 19, 2012	Australian Open	(Egypt) Omar Mosaad	11–9, 11–9, 11–6	53 min
25.	October 13, 2012	US Open	(France) Grégory Gaultier	11–4, 11–9, 11–9	43 min
26.	December 2, 2012	Cathay Pacific Hong Kong Open	(England) James Willstrop	11–8, 3–11, 11–7, 11–6	1h 4 min
27.	December 14, 2012	World Open	(Egypt) Mohamed El Shorbagy	2–11, 11–6, 11–5, 9–11, 11–8	1h 30 min
28.	January 24, 2013	Tournament of Champions	(France) Grégory Gaultier	7–11, 6–11, 12–10, 11–3, 11–1	1h 12 min
29.	March 2, 2013	North American Open	(England) Nick Matthew	11–7, 11–8, 5–11, 11–7	1h 5 min
30.	March 14, 2013	Kuwait PSA Cup	(England) James Willstrop	6–11, 11–8, 11–3, 11–3	58 min
31.	May 26, 2013	British Open	(France) Grégory Gaultier	7–11, 11–4, 11–7, 11–8	1h 4min
32.	October 1, 2013	Netsuite Open	(France) Grégory Gaultier	11–4, 7–11, 7–11, 11–3, 11–2	1h 8min
33	March 19, 2014	World Series Final	(Egypt) Mohamed El Shorbagy	15-17, 11–7, 11–4, 11–5	1h 3 min
34	April 18, 2014	El Gouna International	(Egypt) Mohamed El Shorbagy	11-7, 12–10, 8–11, 11–8	1h 11min
35	November 21, 2014	World Open	(Egypt) Mohamed El Shorbagy	13-11, 7–11, 5–11, 11–5, 14–12	1h 30min
36	April 10, 2015	El Gouna International	(Egypt) Mohamed El Shorbagy	11-9, 11–6, 4–11, 10–12, 12–10	1h 34 min
37	September 30, 2015	Netsuite Open	(England) Nick Matthew	11-7, 9–11, 11–5, 11–4	59 min
38	August 28, 2016	Hong Kong Open	(Egypt) Karim Abdel Gawad	11-9, 8–11, 11–6, 5–11, 11–6	75 min
39	September 3, 2017	J.P. Morgan China Squash Open	(Egypt) Ali Farag	11-3, 11–8, 10–12, 2–11, 11–5	60 min
39	March 18, 2018	Grasshopper Cup	(Egypt) Mohamed El Shorbagy	11-8, 11–9, 11–6	50 min

Note: (ret) = retired, min = minutes, h = hours

=== PSA Tour Finals (Runner-Up) (15) ===
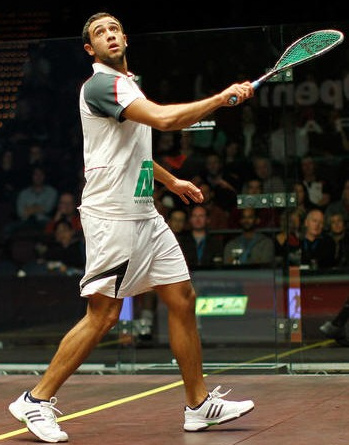
Ramy Ashour during the 2011 Australian Open quarter-final match against Peter Barker.

No.	Date	Tournament	Opponent in Final	Score in Final	Minutes Played
1.	October 22, 2005	Athens Open	(Egypt) Hisham Mohd Ashour	11–7, 2–11, 10–12, 7–11	37 min
2.	January 29, 2006	Dayton Open	(Scotland) John White	5–11, 3–11, 6–11	Unknown
3.	March 11, 2006	COAS International	(Egypt) Mohammed Abbas	4–11, 11–9, 5–11, 7–11	Unknown
4.	October 22, 2006	Hong Kong Open	(Egypt) Amr Shabana	11–13, 11–3, 5–11, 11–13	48 min
5.	October 28, 2007	Saudi International Open	(Egypt) Amr Shabana	5–11, 5–11, 11–1, 9–11	50 min
6.	April 27, 2008	Kuwait Open	(Egypt) Amr Shabana	9–11, 7–11, 11–13	52 min
7.	September 6, 2009	U.S. Open	(Egypt) Amr Shabana	7–11, 2–11, 11–7, 14–12, 8–11	57 min
8.	November 7, 2009	Kuwait Open	(Egypt) Amr Shabana	8–11, 8–11, 5–11	50 min
9.	January 28, 2010	Tournament of Champions	(England) James Willstrop	10–12, 5–11, 11–9, 2–11	49 min
10.	February 27, 2010	North American Open	(England) Nick Matthew	9–11, 14–16, 4-5 (ret)	48 min
11.	August 15, 2010	Australian Open	(England) Nick Matthew	14–16, 7–11, 10–12	1h 17 min
12.	October 24, 2010	El Gouna International	(Egypt) Karim Darwish	14–16, 3–11, 1-5 (ret)	52 min
13.	February 26, 2011	North American Open	(England) Nick Matthew	9–11, 5–11, 11–8, 11–8, 6–11	1h 23 min
14.	February 25, 2012	North American Open	(England) James Willstrop	11–7, 11–8, 11–7	51 min
15.	May 26, 2012	British Open	(England) Nick Matthew	11–9, 11–4, 11–8	49 min

=== Singles performance timeline ===
Terms
W–L	Win–loss	NWS	Not a World Series event
NG50	Not an international event	NH	Not held
A	Absent	LQ/#Q	Lost in qualifying draw and round number
RR	Lost at round robin stage	#R	Lost in the early rounds
QF	Quarterfinalist	SF	Semifinalist
SF-B	Semifinalist, won bronze medal	F	Runner-up
F	Runner-up, won silver medal	W	Winner

To prevent confusion and double counting, information in this table is updated after the player's participation in the tournament has concluded.

Tournament	2005	2006	2007	2008	2009	2010	2011	2012	2013	2014	2015	Career SR	Career W-L
PSA World Tour Tournaments
World Open	1R	QF	A	W	F	2R	QF	W	SF	W		3 / 9	33–6
British Open	A	2R	A	2R	A	Not Held		F	W	SF	A	1 / 5	14–4
Hong Kong Open	NH	F	A	QF	QF	W	A	W	QF	A		2 / 6	20–4
Qatar Classic	LQ	W	2R	QF	SF	A	1R	NH	A	NH	A	1 / 6	11–5
PSA Masters	Not Held		Absent		W	A	QF	Not Held				1 / 2	7–1
Tournament of Champions	Absent		SF	W	SF	F	W	A	W	Absent		3 / 6	25–3
North American Open	Not World Series		A	QF	W	F	F	F	W	Not Held		2 / 6	24–4
Kuwait PSA Cup	A	NH	W	F	NH	W	A	NH	W	Not Held		3 / 4	19–1
US Open	A	SF	A	SF	F	Absent		W	Absent		2R	1 / 5	15–4
Saudi International	1R	1R	F	QF	W	Not Held						1 / 5	11–4
Pakistan International	1R	SF	NH	NWS	Not Held					Not World Series		0 / 2	3–2
Win Ratio	0 / 4	1 / 7	1 / 4	2 / 9	3 / 8	2 / 5	1 / 5	3 / 5	4 / 6	1 / 2	0 / 1	18 / 56	NA
Win–loss	0 / 4	18 / 6	13 / 3	27 / 7	31 / 5	19 / 3	14 / 4	24 / 2	26 / 2	9 / 1	1 / 1	NA	185 / 38

Note: NA = Not Available

== RAM Scoring System ==
On May 19, 2019, Ashour unveiled a new RAM scoring system at his first Ramy Ashour invitation at the CityView Racquet Club in Long Island City NY that he developed with Osama Khalifa. The rules of the game are as follows (taken from RAMscoring site):

"Best of five games, where each game is three minutes long.

The three minutes of game time refers exclusively to actual play time and not the downtime between rallies.

Once the time is up, the clock stops, and the leading player must win one additional point in order to win the game. If the trailing player wins the point, then the game continues until either the leading player wins a final point, or the trailing player evens the score and wins an additional point to conclude the game.

For example: If the score is 8-5 at expiration time, then the leading player must win an additional point (point 9) in order to win the game. If the trailing player were to win the point, then the score becomes 8-6 and the game continues until the leading player wins the game 9-6, or the trailing player evens the score and then wins an additional point. In the event of a tie at expiration time, a final “sudden death” point is played to determine the winner of the game.

In the event that the time expires and the score remains at 0-0 (love-all), the 3-minute clock is then reset and the game resumes.

Time shall not be reverted unless only one of the below scenarios occur: For a “let calls,” the clock reverts to the start time of that point (“Time Revert Rule”)

If the 3-minute time expires and the score remains at 0-0, in which case the 3-minute clock is reset. There must be at least one referee and one “Time Keeper” to officiate the match. Players shall have 2 minutes of rest time between games. All other (Professional Squash Association) PSA and (World Squash Federation) WSF rules apply"

== See also ==
- Official Men's Squash World Ranking
- Micheal Kawooya
- Ian Rukunya

Sporting positions
Preceded by Karim Darwish; Nick Matthew; James Willstrop	World No. 1 January 2010 – May 2010; September 2010 - December 2012; January 2013 - December 2013	Succeeded by Nick Matthew; Nick Matthew; Nick Matthew
Awards and achievements
Preceded by James Willstrop	PSA Young Player of the Year; 2006-07	Succeeded by Omar Mosaad
Awards and achievements
Preceded by Nick Matthew; Nick Matthew	PSA Player of the Year; 2011-12; 2014	Succeeded by Nick Matthew; Current holder
