= James Willstrop =

British squash player (born 1983)

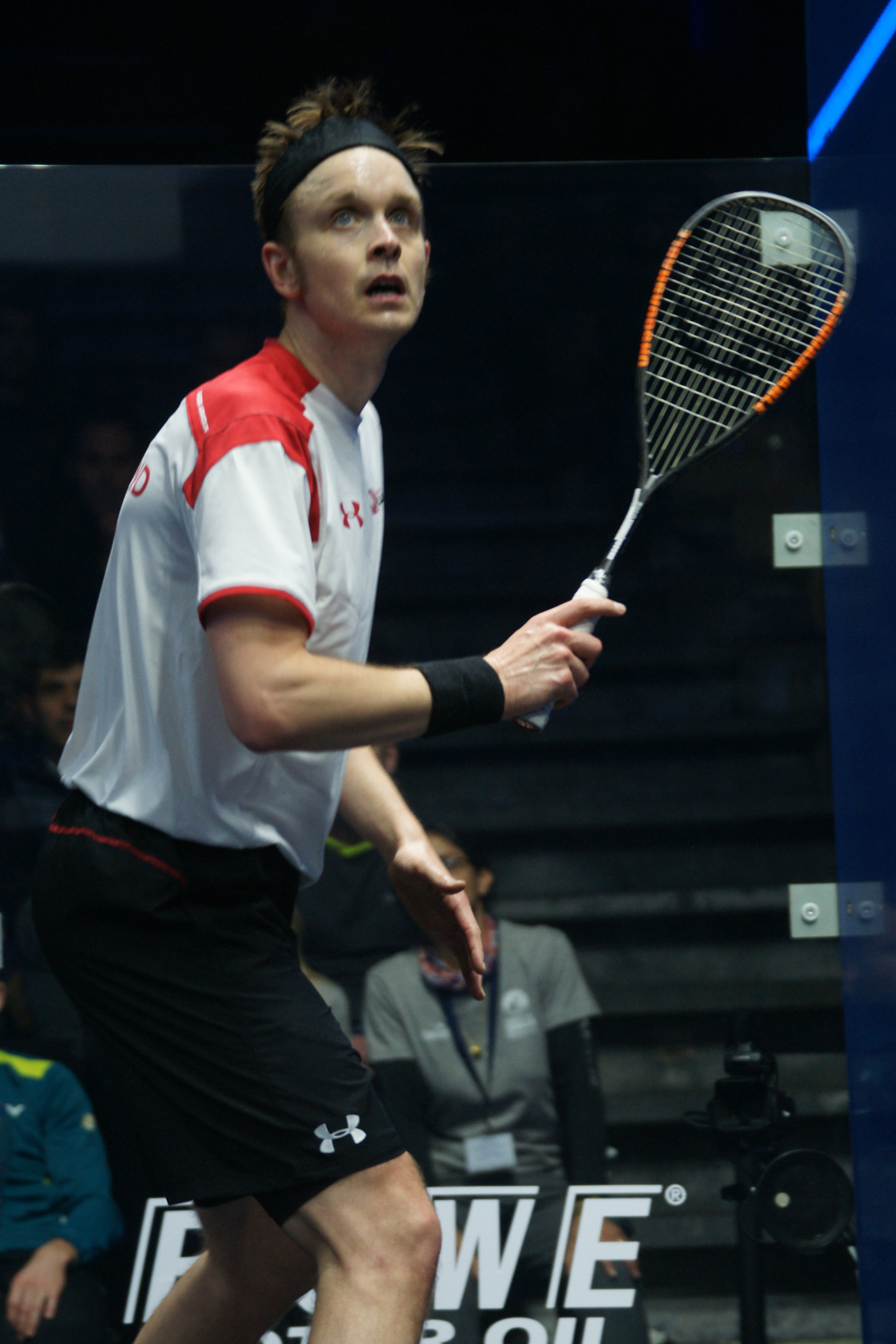
- James Willstrop at the 2017 Men's World Team Squash Championships

Personal information
- Born: 15 August 1983 (age 42) North Walsham, Norfolk, England
- Height: 1.95 m (6 ft 5 in)
- Weight: 88 kg (194 lb)

Sport
- Country: England
- Handedness: Right Handed
- Turned pro: 2002
- Coached by: David Campion
- Retired: Active
- Racquet used: Unsquashable

Men's singles
- Highest ranking: No. 1 (January 2012)
- Current ranking: No. 170 (December 2024)
- Title: 21
- Tour final: 46
Medal record
Men's squash
Representing England
World Championships
Silver medal – second place	2010 Khobar	Singles
Bronze medal – third place	2005 Hong Kong	Singles
Bronze medal – third place	2009 Kuwait	Singles
Bronze medal – third place	2011 Rotterdam	Singles
Bronze medal – third place	2012 Doha	Singles
Bronze medal – third place	2015 Bellevue	Singles
World Team Championships
Gold medal – first place	2005 Islamabad	Team
Gold medal – first place	2007 Chennai	Team
Gold medal – first place	2013 Mulhouse	Team
Silver medal – second place	2011 Paderborn	Team
Silver medal – second place	2017 Marseille	Team
Silver medal – second place	2019 Washington D.C.	Team
Bronze medal – third place	2003 Vienna	Team
World Doubles Championships
Gold medal – first place	2022 Glasgow	Doubles
Bronze medal – third place	2017 Manchester	Doubles
Commonwealth Games
Gold medal – first place	2018 Gold Coast	Singles
Gold medal – first place	2022 Birmingham	Doubles
Silver medal – second place	2006 Melbourne	Mixed doubles
Silver medal – second place	2010 Delhi	Singles
Silver medal – second place	2014 Glasgow	Singles
Bronze medal – third place	2014 Glasgow	Doubles
Bronze medal – third place	2018 Gold Coast	Doubles

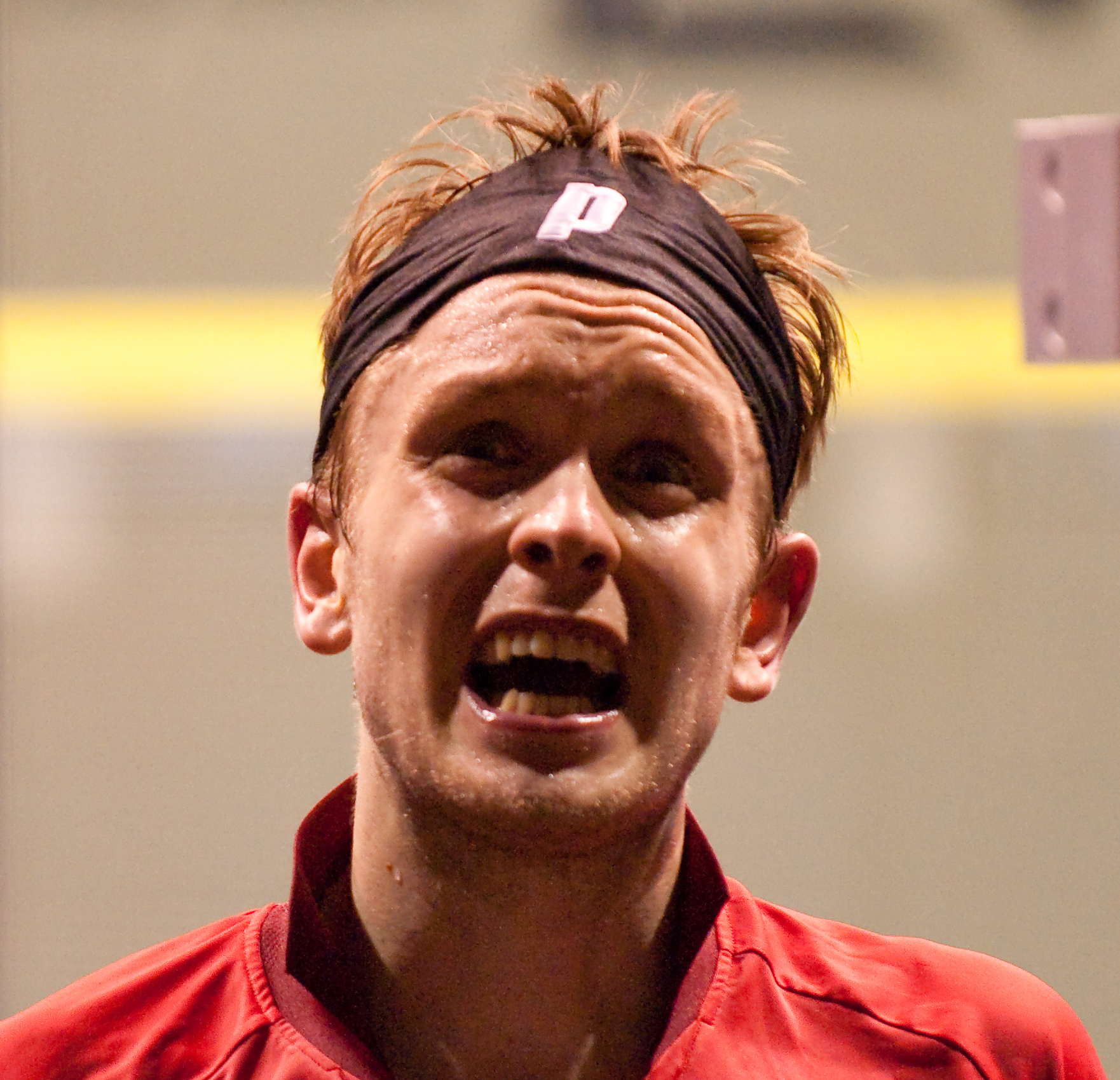
James Willstrop reacts during the 2009 Kuwait Open semi-finals.

James Willstrop (born 15 August 1983) is an English professional squash player from Yorkshire who represented the England men's national squash team and is a former world number 1.

== Career ==
Willstrop has a large build for a squash player, being 6 feet 5 inches (196 cm) and 194 pounds (88 kg). He trains at Pontefract Squash Club in West Yorkshire, where he was trained by his father, Malcolm Willstrop.

In 2002, Willstrop claimed his third consecutive British Junior Under-19 National Championship title, to establish himself as England's most successful junior player of all time – having won National titles at all age groups (under-12, under-14, under-17, and under-19), and British Junior Open trophies at under-14, under-17, and under-19. In the same year, he established himself as the world's top junior player, claiming both the European and the World junior titles.

Willstrop became one of the youngest players to represent the senior England team, making his debut at both the European and World Team Squash Championships in 2003. In 2004, he won the Pakistan Open title in Islamabad (upsetting Amr Shabana in the quarter-finals) in his first appearance in a PSA Super Series final. In 2005, he finished runner-up at the British Open as the seventh seed, then followed this by lifting the Qatar Classic trophy in only his second Super Series final appearance. This first-time success led to Willstrop a career-high World No. 2 in the PSA world rankings published that December. This made Willstrop the top-ranked Englishman, which led to his promotion to squad number one in the England team for the 2005 World Team Championships in Pakistan later in the month when he led the team to victory for the first time in eight years. He also won the bronze medal at the 2005 Men's World Open Squash Championship.

In the 2006 Commonwealth Games in Melbourne, Willstrop partnered with Vicky Botwright to a silver medal in the mixed doubles. In 2007, Willstrop won the British National Squash Championships title, beating John White in the final, helped England retain the 2007 Men's World Team Squash Championships title in Chennai, India, and won the English Open, beating fellow Yorkshireman Nick Matthew in the final.

Willstrop retained his British National title in February 2008, beating fellow Pontefract player Lee Beachill in the final. He also finished runner-up at the British Open for the second time in May 2008, losing in a five-set final to David Palmer. Willstrop held match balls at 10–9 and 11–10 in the fifth game, but Palmer ultimately won 11–9, 11–9, 8–11, 6–11, and 13–11 (3–2).

In 2009, he reached the semi finals of the 2009 Men's World Open Squash Championship and in January 2010, Willstrop won his first Tournament of Champions title in New York, defeating World Number 1 Ramy Ashour in the final and dropping only one game during the tournament. In the singles final of the 2010 Commonwealth Games in Delhi, Willstrop was defeated by compatriot Nick Matthew 11–6, 11–7, 11–7. The match ended after 66 minutes. He also finished runner up to Nick Matthew during the final of the 2010 Men's World Open Squash Championship; it was the first time in the history of the competition that it was an all English final.

In 2011, Willstrop reached the semi finals of the 2011 Men's World Open Squash Championship and finished runner up with England in the 2011 Men's World Team Squash Championships. He ended his 2011 season by winning 15 matches in a row en route to winning the Hong Kong Open, the Kuwait Open, and The Punj Lloyd PSA Masters. With those three PSA World Series titles, Willstrop succeeded fellow Englishman Nick Matthew as the World No. 1, in January 2012. The rivalry with Matthew continued for many years as Willstrop struggled to overcome his compatriot. Matthew regained the World Number 1 ranking and beat Willstrop in six National finals from 2010 to 2018.

In 2013, Willstrop won his third World team title, after winning the 2013 Men's World Team Squash Championships in France. He won two medals at the 2014 Commonwealth Games; a silver in the singles and a bronze in the doubles.

He continued to compete at the highest level into his thirties and won two silver medals in the 2017 Men's World Team Squash Championships and the 2019 Men's World Team Squash Championships. In between he won the gold medal in the singles and bronze medal in the doubles at the 2018 Commonwealth Games. In the men's singles he beat Paul Coll of New Zealand in straight games, 11–9, 11–4, 11–6.

In 2019 and 2020, Willstrop won the British National title, beating Daryl Selby and Joel Makin respectively in the finals. At the 2022 Commonwealth Games (his fifth Games) he won the gold medal partnering Declan James in the men's doubles. Also in 2022, Willstrop won his 13th gold medal for the England team at the 2022 European Squash Team Championships.

Willstrop continued to play on the PSA World Tour and in 2024 he won his 23rd PSA title after securing victory in the Harrogate Open during the 2024–25 PSA Squash Tour.

== Personal life ==
Willstrop is a vegan.

He resides in Harrogate, Yorkshire, with his partner Vanessa Atkinson, herself a professional squash player.

== World Open final appearances ==
Outcome	Year	Location	Opponent in the final	Score in the final
Runner-up	2010	Al-Khobar, Saudi Arabia	(England) Nick Matthew	7–11, 11–6, 11–2, 11–3

== Major World Series final appearances ==
=== British Open ===
Outcome	Year	Opponent in the final	Score in the final
Runner-up	2005	(Australia) Anthony Ricketts	11–7, 11–9, 11–7
Runner-up	2008	(Australia) David Palmer	11–9, 11–9, 8–11, 6–11, 13–11
Runner-up	2009	(England) Nick Matthew	8–11, 11–8, 7–11, 11–3, 12–10

=== Tournament of Champions ===
Outcome	Year	Opponent in the final	Score in the final
Runner-up	2008	(Egypt) Ramy Ashour	11–7, 14–12, 11–9
Winner	2010	(Egypt) Ramy Ashour	12–10, 11–5, 9–11, 11-3
Runner-up	2012	(England) Nick Matthew	8–11, 11–9, 11–5, 11–7

=== Qatar Classic ===
Outcome	Year	Opponent in the final	Score in the final
Winner	2005	(Australia) David Palmer	11–1, 11–7, 11–7
Runner-up	2011	(France) Grégory Gaultier	11–8, 11–7, 2–11, 11–8

=== US Open ===
Outcome	Year	Opponent in the final	Score in the final
Runner-up	2009	(England) Nick Matthew	11–7, 11–4, 11–7

=== Pakistan International ===
Outcome	Year	Opponent in the final	Score in the final
Winner	2004	(Australia) Anthony Ricketts	6–11, 11–9, 13–11, 11–3

Sporting positions
Preceded by Nick Matthew; Nick Matthew	World No. 1 January 2012; March 2012 – December 2012	Succeeded by Nick Matthew; Ramy Ashour
Awards and achievements
Preceded by –	PSA Young Player of the Year; 2005	Succeeded by Ramy Ashour
Awards and achievements
Preceded by Amr Shabana	PSA Player of the Year; 2007	Succeeded by Karim Darwish
