= 2012 PSA World Tour =

PSA World Tour 2012

Details
- Event name: PSA World Tour 2012
- Tournaments: 117
- Categories: PSA World Championship; PSA World Series (6); PSA World Series Finals; PSA International (22); PSA Challenger (87)
- Website www.psaworldtour.com

Achievements
- World Number 1: (England) James Willstrop (11 months) (England) Nick Matthew (1 month)
- World Champion: (Egypt) Ramy Ashour

Awards
- Player of the year: (Egypt) Ramy Ashour
- Young player of the year: (Egypt) Marwan El Shorbagy

The PSA World Tour 2012 is the international squash tour organised circuit organized by the Professional Squash Association (PSA) for the 2012 squash season. The most important tournament in the series is the World Championship held in Doha in Qatar. The tour features three categories of regular events, World Series, which feature the highest prize money and the best fields, International and Challenger. The Tour is concluded by the PSA World Series Finals, the end of season championship for the top 8 rated players.

== 2012 Calendar ==
=== Key ===
World Championship
World Series Platinum
World Series Gold
International 70
International 50

=== World Championship ===
Tournament	Date	Champion	Runner-up	Semifinalists	Quarterfinalists	Round of 16	
PSA World Championship 2012 (Qatar) Doha, Qatar; World Championship $325,000 - Draw	8–15 December 2012	(Egypt) Ramy Ashour; 2-11, 11-6, 11-5, 9-11, 11-8	(Egypt) Mohamed El Shorbagy	(England) James Willstrop (England) Nick Matthew	(France) Grégory Gaultier (Egypt) Karim Darwish (Egypt) Amr Shabana (Spain) Borja Golán	(England) Peter Barker (Egypt) Omar Mosaad (England) Daryl Selby (Botswana) Alister Walker	(Egypt) Tarek Momen (Australia) Cameron Pilley (India) Saurav Ghosal (England) Chris Simpson

=== World Series ===
Prize money: $115,000 and more

Tournament	Date	Champion	Runner-up	Semifinalists	Quarterfinalists
Tournament of Champions 2012 (United States) New York City, United States; World Series Gold $115,000 - Draw	20–26 January 2012	(England) Nick Matthew; 8-11, 11-9, 11-5, 11-7	(England) James Willstrop	(France) Grégory Gaultier (England) Daryl Selby	(Egypt) Amr Shabana (England) Peter Barker (Egypt) Mohamed El Shorbagy (Egypt) Marwan El Shorbagy
North American Open 2012 (United States) Richmond, Virginia, United States; World Series Gold $115,000 - Draw	19–25 February 2012	(England) James Willstrop; 11-7, 11-8, 11-7	(Egypt) Ramy Ashour	(France) Grégory Gaultier (England) Nick Matthew	(Egypt) Karim Darwish (Egypt) Amr Shabana (Germany) Simon Rösner (Egypt) Karim Abdel Gawad
El Gouna International 2012 (Egypt) El Gouna, Egypt; World Series Gold $115,000 - Draw	8–13 April 2012	(Egypt) Ramy Ashour; 12-10, 11-5, 5-2 rtd	(England) James Willstrop	(England) Nick Matthew (Egypt) Karim Darwish	(France) Grégory Gaultier (Egypt) Mohamed El Shorbagy (Netherlands) Laurens Jan Anjema (Egypt) Hisham Mohd Ashour
British Open 2012 (England) London, England; World Series Platinum $150,000 - Draw	14–20 May 2012	(England) Nick Matthew; 11-9, 11-4, 11-8	(Egypt) Ramy Ashour	(England) James Willstrop (England) Peter Barker	(France) Grégory Gaultier (Egypt) Amr Shabana (Egypt) Mohamed El Shorbagy (Netherlands) Laurens Jan Anjema
US Open 2012 (United States) Philadelphia, United States; World Series Gold $115,000 - Draw	5–12 October 2012	(Egypt) Ramy Ashour; 11-4, 11-9, 11-9	(France) Grégory Gaultier	(England) James Willstrop (England) Nick Matthew	(Egypt) Karim Darwish (England) Peter Barker (Egypt) Amr Shabana (Egypt) Mohamed El Shorbagy
Hong Kong Open 2012; Hong Kong, China; World Series Platinum $150,000 - Draw	27–2 December 2012	(Egypt) Ramy Ashour; 11-8, 3-11, 11-7, 11-6	(England) James Willstrop	(England) Nick Matthew (Egypt) Karim Darwish	(France) Grégory Gaultier (England) Peter Barker (Egypt) Amr Shabana (Spain) Borja Golán

Final tournament	Date	Champion	Runner-up	Semifinalists	Round Robin
PSA World Series Finals 2012 (England) Queen's Club, London, England; PSA World Series Finals $110,000 - Draw	2–6 January 2013	(Egypt) Amr Shabana; 4-11, 11-2, 11-4, 11-7	(England) Nick Matthew	(England) James Willstrop (France) Grégory Gaultier	(Egypt) Mohd El Shorbagy (Egypt) Karim Darwish (England) Peter Barker (Germany) Simon Rösner

=== International ===
Prize money: between $25,000 and $114,999

==== January ====
Tournament	Date	Champion	Runner-up	Semifinalists	Quarterfinalists
Comfort Inn Open 2012 (Canada) Vancouver, Canada; International 50 $50,000 - Draw	12–15 January 2012	(Egypt) Amr Shabana; 7-11, 11-9, 11-7, 12-10	(Egypt) Hisham Mohd Ashour	(Egypt) Omar Mosaad (Egypt) Tarek Momen	(Australia) Cameron Pilley (Finland) Olli Tuominen (Egypt) Mohd Ali Anwar Reda (Egypt) Mohamed Abouelghar
Motor City Open 2012 (United States) Detroit, United States; International 50 $50,000 - Draw	27–30 January 2012	(Malaysia) Ong Beng Hee; 11-8, 11-9, 11-7	(Egypt) Hisham Mohd Ashour	(Egypt) Mohamed El Shorbagy (South Africa) Stephen Coppinger	(Botswana) Alister Walker (Australia) Cameron Pilley (Colombia) Miguel Ángel Rodríguez (Hong Kong) Max Lee

==== February ====
Tournament	Date	Champion	Runner-up	Semifinalists	Quarterfinalists
Swedish Open 2012 (Sweden) Linköping, Sweden; International 70 $70,000 - Draw	2–5 February 2012	(France) Grégory Gaultier; 11-3, 11-6, 11-8	(Egypt) Karim Darwish	(England) Peter Barker (England) Daryl Selby	(England) Tom Richards (Switzerland) Nicolas Müller (Germany) Simon Rösner (South Africa) Stephen Coppinger
Metro Squash Windy City Open 2012 (United States) Chicago, United States; International 25 $25,000	9–12 February 2012	(India) Saurav Ghosal; 11-8, 15-13, 10-12, 11-5	(Pakistan) Yasir Butt	(Egypt) Mohd Ali Anwar Reda (Scotland) Alan Clyne	(Australia) Ryan Cuskelly (Mexico) Arturo Salazar (Canada) Shawn Delierre (England) Oliver Pett

==== March ====
Tournament	Date	Champion	Runner-up	Semifinalists	Quarterfinalists
HKFC Invitational 2012; Hong Kong, China; International 25 $25,000	14–17 March 2012	(Egypt) Omar Mosaad; 3-11, 11-5, 11-8, 11-4	(Finland) Olli Tuominen	(Malaysia) Muhd Asyraf Azan (Hong Kong) Leo Au	(Hong Kong) Max Lee (France) Grégoire Marche (India) Siddharth Suchde (Egypt) Amr Khaled Khalifa
Manitoba Squash Open 2012 (Canada) Winnipeg, Canada; International 35 $35,000	15–18 March 2012	(Spain) Borja Golán; 11-1, 11-5, 11-4	(Netherlands) Laurens Jan Anjema	(Australia) Cameron Pilley (England) Tom Richards	(England) Jonathan Kemp (Scotland) Alan Clyne (Canada) Shawn Delierre (Germany) Raphael Kandra
Canary Wharf Squash Classic 2012 (England) London, England; International 50 $50,000 - Draw	19–23 March 2012	(England) Nick Matthew; 11-7, 11-8, 11-9	(England) James Willstrop	(England) Peter Barker (Egypt) Mohamed El Shorbagy	(England) Daryl Selby (England) Adrian Grant (Egypt) Tarek Momen (Germany) Simon Rösner
Montréal Open 2012 (Canada) Montreal, Canada; International 35 $35,000	20–23 March 2012	(England) Tom Richards; 11-7, 8-11, 11-8, 5-11, 11-5	(France) Thierry Lincou	(Egypt) Hisham Mohd Ashour (France) Mathieu Castagnet	(Australia) Cameron Pilley (Scotland) Alan Clyne (New Zealand) Martin Knight (Australia) Steven Finitsis
CIMB KL Open Squash Championships 2012 (Malaysia) Kuala Lumpur, Malaysia; International 50 $50,000 - Draw	28–31 March 2012	(Egypt) Omar Mosaad; 11-6, 13-11, 12-14, 6-11, 11-8	(England) Adrian Grant	(Egypt) Karim Darwish (Malaysia) Ong Beng Hee	(India) Saurav Ghosal (Malaysia) Mohd Nafiizwan Adnan (Hong Kong) Max Lee (Hong Kong) Leo Au
Bluenose Classic 2012 (Canada) Halifax, Canada; International 50 $55,000 - Draw	28–31 March 2012	(France) Thierry Lincou; 9-11, 11-8, 9-11, 11-5, 11-4	(England) Daryl Selby	(Netherlands) Laurens Jan Anjema (Egypt) Hisham Mohd Ashour	(Egypt) Amr Shabana (Spain) Borja Golán (United States) Stephen Coppinger (United States) Julian Illingworth

==== April ====
Tournament	Date	Champion	Runner-up	Semifinalists	Quarterfinalists
Berkshire Squash Open 2012 (United States) Williamstown, United States; International 35 $35,000	11–15 April 2012	(Botswana) Alister Walker; 11-8, 11-7, 11-7	(England) Tom Richards	(Spain) Borja Golán (United States) Julian Illingworth	(Colombia) Miguel Ángel Rodríguez (Canada) Shawn Delierre (Pakistan) Yasir Butt (England) Oliver Pett
Grasshopper Cup 2012 (Switzerland) Zürich, Switzerland; International 25 $25,000	25–28 April 2012	(England) Daryl Selby; 12-10, 11-7, 8-11, 11-4	(Switzerland) Nicolas Müller	(Finland) Olli Tuominen (Egypt) Karim Abdel Gawad	(Czech Republic) Jan Koukal (Egypt) Omar Abdel Meguid (Denmark) Kristian Frost Olesen (England) Charles Sharpes
Irish Squash Open 2012 (Republic of Ireland) Dublin, Ireland; International 25 $25,000	25–28 April 2012	(Botswana) Alister Walker; 11-4, 11-6, 9-11, 11-3	(Scotland) Alan Clyne	(Spain) Borja Golán (England) Jonathan Kemp	(France) Mathieu Castagnet (England) Robbie Temple (United States) Christopher Gordon (Denmark) Rasmus Nielsen

==== August ====
Tournament	Date	Champion	Runner-up	Semifinalists	Quarterfinalists
Australian Open 2012 (Australia) Canberra, Australia; International 70 $70,000 - Draw	13–18 August 2012	(Egypt) Ramy Ashour; 11-9, 11-6, 11-6	(Egypt) Omar Mosaad	(England) Tom Richards (Australia) Cameron Pilley	(Malaysia) Ong Beng Hee (Switzerland) Nicolas Müller (Scotland) Alan Clyne (Egypt) Omar Abdel Aziz
Colombian Open 2012 (Colombia) Bogotá, Colombia; International 35 $35,000	29 August - 1 September 2012	(Egypt) Tarek Momen; 3-11, 11-4, 11-3, 12-10	(Colombia) Miguel Ángel Rodríguez	(South Africa) Stephen Coppinger (Finland) Henrik Mustonen	(Egypt) Mohamed El Shorbagy (Egypt) Mohd Ali Anwar Reda (New Zealand) Martin Knight (England) Jaymie Haycocks

==== September ====
Tournament	Date	Champion	Runner-up	Semifinalists	Quarterfinalists
Malaysian Open Squash Championships 2012 (Malaysia) Kuala Lumpur, Malaysia; International 50 $50,000 - Draw	12–15 September 2012	(Egypt) Tarek Momen; 12-10, 6-11, 12-10, 8-11, 14-12	(Egypt) Mohamed El Shorbagy	(Spain) Borja Golán (Switzerland) Nicolas Müller	(Egypt) Karim Darwish (Finland) Olli Tuominen (Malaysia) Mohd Nafiizwan Adnan (Kuwait) Abdullah Al Muzayen
British Grand Prix 2012 (England) Manchester, England; International 70 $70,000 - Draw	21–24 September 2012	(England) Nick Matthew; 4-11, 11-6, 11-9, 11-5	(England) James Willstrop	(France) Grégory Gaultier (England) Peter Barker	(Netherlands) Laurens Jan Anjema (Botswana) Alister Walker (England) Adrian Grant (Germany) Simon Rösner

==== October ====
Tournament	Date	Champion	Runner-up	Semifinalists	Quarterfinalists
Santiago Open 2012 (Spain) Santiago de Compostela, Spain; International 25 $25,000	17–20 October 2012	(Germany) Simon Rösner; 8-11, 11-5, 11-8, 16-14	(Australia) Cameron Pilley	(England) Adrian Grant (Spain) Borja Golán	(England) Adrian Waller (Egypt) Omar Abdel Aziz (Malaysia) Ivan Yuen (South Africa) Shaun Le Roux
Macau Open 2012; Macau, China; International 50 $50,000 - Draw	18–21 October 2012	(Egypt) Karim Darwish; 9-11, 11-7, 10-12, 11-4, 11-9	(Egypt) Mohamed El Shorbagy	(Egypt) Marwan El Shorbagy (Egypt) Karim Abdel Gawad	(Egypt) Omar Mosaad (England) Tom Richards (Hong Kong) Max Lee (Egypt) Karim Ali Fathi
Netsuite Open 2012 (United States) San Francisco, United States; International 70 $70,000 - Draw	19–23 October 2012	(France) Grégory Gaultier; 11-7, 13-11, 11-9	(England) Nick Matthew	(England) Peter Barker (Egypt) Amr Shabana	(England) James Willstrop (Netherlands) Laurens Jan Anjema (England) Daryl Selby (Egypt) Tarek Momen

==== November ====
Tournament	Date	Champion	Runner-up	Semifinalists	Quarterfinalists
Abierto Mexicano de Raquetas 2012 (Mexico) Toluca, Mexico; International 70 $70,000 - Draw	1–4 November 2012	(France) Grégory Gaultier; 11-6, 11-8, 11-5	(Egypt) Omar Mosaad	(England) Peter Barker (Germany) Simon Rösner	(Egypt) Karim Darwish (Egypt) Mohamed El Shorbagy (Spain) Borja Golán (Switzerland) Nicolas Müller
Dayton Open 2012 (United States) Dayton, United States; International 35 $35,000	7–10 November 2012	(Spain) Borja Golán; 11-5, 11-6, 11-6	(Botswana) Alister Walker	(Egypt) Omar Mosaad (Australia) Ryan Cuskelly	(Australia) Cameron Pilley (Egypt) Marwan El Shorbagy (France) Mathieu Castagnet (France) Grégoire Marche

== Year end world top 10 players ==
Rank	2012	
1	(England) James Willstrop	1082.500
2	(England) Nick Matthew	996.000
3	(France) Grégory Gaultier	995.500
4	(Egypt) Ramy Ashour	894.500
5	(England) Peter Barker	539.000
6	(Egypt) Mohamed El Shorbagy	531.000
7	(Egypt) Karim Darwish	511.500
8	(Egypt) Omar Mosaad	440.000
9	(Egypt) Amr Shabana	415.500
10	(England) Daryl Selby	412.000

== Retirements ==
Following is a list of notable players (winners of a main tour title, and/or part of the PSA World Rankings top 30 for at least one month) who announced their retirement from professional squash, became inactive, or were permanently banned from playing, during the 2012 season:

- Thierry Lincou (born 2 April 1976 in the Réunion Island, France) joined the pro tour in 1994, became the first French squash player to be ranked world no. 1 spot in 2004 and win the World Open in 2004. Keeping the spot for a whole year in 2004. He won 17 PSA World Tour titles including Cathay Pacific Hong Kong Open in 2004 and two times the Bluenose Classic. He was one of only five players to have maintained themselves in the top 10 without interruption for 10 years at the PSA World Tour. He retired in August after win the Bluenose Classic.
- Mohd Azlan Iskandar (born 1 June 1982 in Sarawak, Malaysia) joined the pro tour in 2000, reached the singles no. 10 spot in 2011. He won 13 PSA World Tour titles including Malaysian Open and the Cannon Kirk Irish Open. He retired in July after competing a last time in the Kuala Lumpur Open.
- Mohammed Abbas (born 24 December 1980 in Giza, Egypt) joined the pro tour in 1998, reached the singles no. 13 spot in April 2007. He won 4 PSA World Tour titles including Kuala Lumpur Open in 2007. He retired after losing in the first round of the Qatar World Open in December 2012.
- Davide Bianchetti (born 8 March 1977 in Brescia, Italy) joined the pro tour in 1996, reached the singles no. 24 spot in October 2004. He won 10 PSA World Tour. In 2003, he reached the quarter final of the World Open. He retired in December after competing a last time in the Prague Open.

== See also ==
- WSA World Tour 2012
- PSA World Series
- PSA World Rankings
- PSA World Series Finals
- PSA World Open
