= 2010 PSA World Tour =

PSA World Tour 2010

Details
- Event name: PSA World Tour 2010
- Tournaments: 127
- Categories: PSA World Championship; PSA World Series (10); PSA World Series Finals; PSA Stars (over 2&1/2) (18); PSA Stars (under 2&1/2) (97)
- Website www.psaworldtour.com

Achievements
- World Number 1: (Egypt) Ramy Ashour (9 months) (England) Nick Matthew (3 months)
- World Champion: (England) Nick Matthew

Awards
- Player of the year: (England) Nick Matthew
- Young player of the year: (Egypt) Mohamed El Shorbagy

The PSA World Tour 2010 is the international squash tour organised circuit organized by the Professional Squash Association (PSA) for the 2010 squash season. The most important tournament in the series is the World Open held in Saudi Arabia. The tour features three categories of regular events, Super Series, which feature the highest prize money and the best fields, Stars Tournament and Challenger. The Tour is concluded by the PSA Super Series Finals, the end of season championship for the top 8 rated players.

== 2010 Calendar ==
=== Key ===
World Open
World Series Platinum
World Series Gold
5 Stars
4 Stars

=== World Open ===
Tournament	Date	Champion	Runner-up	Semifinalists	Quarterfinalists	Round of 16	
World Open 2010 (Saudi Arabia) Al-Khobar, Saudi Arabia; World Open $327,500 - Draw	2–10 December 2010	(England) Nick Matthew; 8-11, 11-6, 11-2, 11-3	(England) James Willstrop	(Egypt) Amr Shabana (England) Peter Barker	(Egypt) Karim Darwish (France) Grégory Gaultier (France) Thierry Lincou (Egypt) Mohamed El Shorbagy	(England) Daryl Selby (Australia) David Palmer (Egypt) Wael El Hindi (Malaysia) Mohd Azlan Iskandar	(Botswana) Alister Walker (Australia) Stewart Boswell (Pakistan) Aamir Atlas Khan (Egypt) Hisham Mohd Ashour

=== Super Series ===
Prize money: $92,500 and more

Tournament	Date	Champion	Runner-up	Semifinalists	Quarterfinalists
Tournament of Champions 2010 (United States) New York City, United States; World Series Silver $97,500	22–28 January 2010	(England) James Willstrop; 12-10, 11-5, 9-11, 11-3	(Egypt) Ramy Ashour	(Egypt) Karim Darwish (England) Nick Matthew	(France) Grégory Gaultier (Egypt) Amr Shabana (Australia) David Palmer (Egypt) Wael El Hindi
North American Open 2010 (United States) Richmond, Virginia, United States; World Series Silver $93,500	20–26 February 2010	(England) Nick Matthew; 11-9, 16-14, 5-4	(Egypt) Ramy Ashour	(Egypt) Amr Shabana (England) James Willstrop	(France) Grégory Gaultier (France) Thierry Lincou (England) Adrian Grant (Finland) Olli Tuominen
Sky Open 2010 (Egypt) Cairo, Egypt; World Series Platinum $150,000	17–22 May 2010	(England) Nick Matthew; 6-11, 11-7, 12-10, 13-11	(Egypt) Karim Darwish	(Egypt) Ramy Ashour (France) Thierry Lincou	(England) James Willstrop (France) Grégory Gaultier (England) Peter Barker (Egypt) Wael El Hindi
Australian Open 2010 (Australia) Canberra, Australia; World Series Platinum $142,500	10–15 August 2010	(England) Nick Matthew; 16-14, 11-7, 12-10	(Egypt) Ramy Ashour	(France) Grégory Gaultier (England) James Willstrop	(Egypt) Amr Shabana (Egypt) Karim Darwish (France) Thierry Lincou (England) Peter Barker
Hong Kong Open 2010; Hong Kong, China; World Series Platinum $147,500	25–29 August 2010	(Egypt) Ramy Ashour; 10-12, 11-9, 11-9, 9-11, 11-9	(France) Grégory Gaultier	(Egypt) Karim Darwish (England) Peter Barker	(England) Nick Matthew (Egypt) Amr Shabana (England) James Willstrop (France) Thierry Lincou
British Grand Prix 2010 (England) Manchester, England; World Series Silver $92,500	15–20 September 2010	(Egypt) Ramy Ashour; 11-7, 3-11, 11-3, 11-5	(England) James Willstrop	(France) Grégory Gaultier (England) David Palmer	(Egypt) Amr Shabana (France) Thierry Lincou (England) Daryl Selby (India) Saurav Ghosal
El Gouna International 2010 (Egypt) El Gouna, Egypt; World Series Platinum $142,500	18–24 October 2010	(Egypt) Karim Darwish; 16-14, 11-3, 5-0	(Egypt) Ramy Ashour	(France) Grégory Gaultier (France) Thierry Lincou	(Egypt) Amr Shabana (England) James Willstrop (Australia) Cameron Pilley (Egypt) Omar Mosaad
Kuwait PSA Cup 2010; Kuwait City, Kuwait; World Series Platinum $172,500	28 October - 2 November 2010	(Egypt) Ramy Ashour; 9-11, 11-4, 13-11, 11-1	(Egypt) Amr Shabana	(France) Grégory Gaultier (England) James Willstrop	(Egypt) Karim Darwish (France) Thierry Lincou (England) Peter Barker (England) Daryl Selby
Qatar Classic 2010; Doha, Qatar; World Series Platinum $147,500	7–12 November 2010	(Egypt) Karim Darwish; 8-11, 11-2, 11-7, 11-6	(Egypt) Amr Shabana	(England) Nick Matthew (France) Grégory Gaultier	(England) James Willstrop (England) Peter Barker (France) Thierry Lincou (England) Daryl Selby
PSA Masters 2010 (India) New Delhi, India; World Series Platinum $192,500	12–18 December 2010	(England) Nick Matthew; 11-5, 11-8, 11-7	(England) James Willstrop	(Egypt) Amr Shabana (Egypt) Hisham Mohd Ashour	(France) Thierry Lincou (Egypt) Mohamed El Shorbagy (England) Daryl Selby (Australia) Cameron Pilley

Final tournament	Date	Champion	Runner-up	Semifinalists	Round Robin
PSA World Series Finals 2010 (England) Queen's Club, London, England; PSA World Series Finals $110,000	4–8 January 2010	(England) Nick Matthew / (Egypt) Amr Shabana		(England) James Willstrop (Egypt) Ramy Ashour	(France) Thierry Lincou (England) Peter Barker (Egypt) Wael El Hindi (Botswana) Alister Walker

=== Stars ===
Prize money: between $25,000 (2&1/2 Stars) and $50,000 (5 Stars)

==== January ====
Tournament	Date	Champion	Runner-up	Semifinalists	Quarterfinalists
Kig Open 2010 (United States) Los Angeles, United States; 2&1/2 Stars $28,000	7–10 January 2010	(Egypt) Omar Mosaad; 11-7, 4-11, 11-4, 11-9	(Canada) Shahier Razik	(Egypt) Tarek Momen (England) Tom Richards	(Australia) Aaron Frankcomb (England) Chris Simpson (Pakistan) Yasir Butt (Belgium) Stefan Casteleyn
Motor City Open 2010 (United States) Detroit, United States; 4 Stars $40,000	29 January - 1 February 2010	(Egypt) Karim Darwish; 11-3, 11-7, 11-4	(Malaysia) Mohd Azlan Iskandar	(France) Thierry Lincou (Egypt) Omar Abdel Aziz	(Finland) Olli Tuominen (Hungary) Márk Krajcsák (England) Chris Ryder (Australia) Ryan Cuskelly

==== February ====
Tournament	Date	Champion	Runner-up	Semifinalists	Quarterfinalists
Swedish Open 2010 (Sweden) Linköping, Sweden; 5 Stars $60,000	4–7 February 2010	(England) Nick Matthew; 11-9, 11-6, 6-2	(England) James Willstrop	(Egypt) Amr Shabana (Australia) Cameron Pilley	(France) Grégory Gaultier (England) Adrian Grant (Botswana) Alister Walker (Australia) Stewart Boswell
Bluenose Classic 2010 (Canada) Halifax, Canada; 4 Stars $40,000	4–7 February 2010	(France) Thierry Lincou; 11-2, 10-12, 11-8, 12-10	(England) Daryl Selby	(England) Peter Barker (Australia) David Palmer	(Malaysia) Mohd Azlan Iskandar (Malaysia) Ong Beng Hee (Canada) Shahier Razik (Australia) Aaron Frankcomb

==== March ====
Tournament	Date	Champion	Runner-up	Semifinalists	Quarterfinalists
Montreal Open 2010 (Canada) Montreal, Canada; 4 Stars $40,000	3–6 March 2010	(Netherlands) Laurens Jan Anjema; 11-9, 11-8, 11-1	(England) Daryl Selby	(England) Adrian Grant (Canada) Shahier Razik	(Finland) Olli Tuominen (England) Tom Richards (United States) Gilly Lane (Australia) Scott Arnold
Chennai Squash Open 2010 (India) Chennai, India; 2&1/2 Stars $25,000	4–7 March 2010	(Malaysia) Ong Beng Hee; 14-12, 11-9, 11-9	(England) Jonathan Kemp	(Egypt) Mohd Ali Anwar Reda (India) Saurav Ghosal	(England) Chris Simpson (France) Yann Perrin (Scotland) Alan Clyne (England) Laurence Delasaux
Rocky Mountain Open 2010 (Canada) Calgary, Canada; 3 Stars $30,750	17–20 March 2010	(England) Daryl Selby; 11-7, 11-4, 12-10	(Egypt) Hisham Mohd Ashour	(Netherlands) Laurens Jan Anjema (Canada) Shahier Razik	(Mexico) Eric Gálvez (Italy) Stéphane Galifi (United States) Gilly Lane (South Africa) Clinton Leeuw
Kuala Lumpur Open Squash Championships 2010 (Malaysia) Kuala Lumpur, Malaysia; 5 Stars $50,000	17–20 March 2010	(Egypt) Ramy Ashour; 11-8, 11-8, 11-9	(Egypt) Karim Darwish	(Malaysia) Ong Beng Hee (Malaysia) Mohd Azlan Iskandar	(Egypt) Mohamed El Shorbagy (Australia) Stewart Boswell (Australia) Cameron Pilley (Pakistan) Aamir Atlas Khan
Canary Wharf Squash Classic 2010 (England) Canary Wharf, London, England; 5 Stars $52,500	22–26 March 2010	(England) Nick Matthew; 12-10, 6-11, 13-11, 11-3	(France) Grégory Gaultier	(England) James Willstrop (England) Peter Barker	(Australia) David Palmer (France) Thierry Lincou (Botswana) Alister Walker (England) Daryl Selby

==== April ====
Tournament	Date	Champion	Runner-up	Semifinalists	Quarterfinalists
Berkshire Squash Open 2010 (United States) Williamstown, United States; 2&1/2 Stars $25,000	8–11 April 2010	(Australia) Stewart Boswell; 12-10, 2-11, 11-7, 11-4	(Botswana) Alister Walker	(England) Joey Barrington (Canada) Shawn Delierre	(Colombia) Miguel Ángel Rodríguez (France) Julien Balbo (United States) Gilly Lane (England) Robbie Temple
Heliopolis Open 2010 (Egypt) Cairo, Egypt; 5 Stars $50,000	14–17 April 2010	(France) Grégory Gaultier; 8-11, 11-2, 11-6, 11-5	(Egypt) Omar Mosaad	(Egypt) Karim Darwish (Egypt) Hisham Mohd Ashour	(Egypt) Mohd Ali Anwar Reda (England) Tom Richards (Germany) Simon Rösner (Switzerland) Nicolas Müller
Kolkata International 2010 (India) Kolkata, India; 5 Stars $50,000	14–17 April 2010	(Egypt) Mohamed El Shorbagy; 8-11, 11-2, 11-6, 11-5	(Egypt) Tarek Momen	(Australia) Cameron Pilley (India) Saurav Ghosal	(England) Adrian Grant (Malaysia) Mohd Azlan Iskandar (Malaysia) Ong Beng Hee (England) Jonathan Kemp

==== July ====
Tournament	Date	Champion	Runner-up	Semifinalists	Quarterfinalists
Malaysian Open Squash Championships 2010 (Malaysia) Kuala Lumpur, Malaysia; 5 Stars $52,500	21–24 July 2010	(Malaysia) Mohd Azlan Iskandar; 11-5, 11-6, 11-8	(Egypt) Tarek Momen	(Egypt) Mohamed El Shorbagy (Pakistan) Farhan Mehboob	(Australia) Stewart Boswell (Malaysia) Ong Beng Hee (Pakistan) Aamir Atlas Khan (Germany) Simon Rösner

==== September ====
Tournament	Date	Champion	Runner-up	Semifinalists	Quarterfinalists
Irish Squash Open 2010 (Republic of Ireland) Dublin, Ireland; 2&1/2 Stars $25,000	1–4 September 2010	(Malaysia) Mohd Azlan Iskandar; 11-9, 8-11, 9-11, 13-11, 11-5	(Spain) Borja Golán	(England) Chris Ryder (France) Grégoire Marche	(England) Joey Barrington (England) Chris Simpson (France) Mathieu Castagnet (Malta) Bradley Hindle
Colombian Open 2010 (Colombia) Bogotá, Colombia; 3 Stars $35,000	2–5 September 2010	(Colombia) Miguel Ángel Rodríguez; 9-11, 11-9, 11-5, 11-5	(Finland) Olli Tuominen	(Canada) Shahier Razik (Mexico) Arturo Salazar	(Brazil) Rafael Alarçón (Italy) Stéphane Galifi (Czech Republic) Jan Koukal (Mexico) Cesar Salazar

==== October ====
Tournament	Date	Champion	Runner-up	Semifinalists	Quarterfinalists
US Open 2010 (United States) Chicago, United States; 5 Stars $80,000	27 September - 2 October 2010	(Egypt) Wael El Hindi; 11-8, 5-11, 11-7, 11-7	(Netherlands) Laurens Jan Anjema	(Egypt) Omar Mosaad (Finland) Olli Tuominen	(France) Thierry Lincou (Egypt) Mohamed El Shorbagy (Switzerland) Nicolas Müller (Egypt) Mohammed Abbas

==== November ====
Tournament	Date	Champion	Runner-up	Semifinalists	Quarterfinalists
Santiago Open 2010 (Spain) Santiago de Compostela, Spain; 3 Stars $31,175	17–20 November 2010	(England) Adrian Grant; 6-11, 11-7, 11-7, 12-10	(Egypt) Omar Mosaad	(Finland) Olli Tuominen (Egypt) Mohammed Abbas	(Colombia) Miguel Ángel Rodríguez (Mexico) Arturo Salazar (South Africa) Stephen Coppinger (Spain) Borja Golán
Dutch Open Squash 2010 (Netherlands) Rotterdam, Netherlands; 3 Stars $30,000	18–21 November 2010	(Australia) Cameron Pilley; 11-7, 11-9, 11-13, 14-12	(Netherlands) Laurens Jan Anjema	(Australia) Stewart Boswell (England) Chris Ryder	(Botswana) Alister Walker (Egypt) Hisham Mohd Ashour (Germany) Simon Rösner (Australia) Steven Finitsis

== Year end world top 10 players ==
Rank	2010	
1	(England) Nick Matthew	1716.750
2	(England) James Willstrop	1392.250
3	(France) Grégory Gaultier	1050.750
4	(Egypt) Ramy Ashour	1028.250
5	(Egypt) Karim Darwish	980.750
6	(Egypt) Amr Shabana	789.500
7	(England) Peter Barker	644.000
8	(Egypt) Mohamed El Shorbagy	642.875
9	(Australia) David Palmer	485.000
10	(Malaysia) Mohd Azlan Iskandar	465.000

== Retirements ==
Following is a list of notable players (winners of a main tour title, and/or part of the PSA World Rankings top 30 for at least one month) who announced their retirement from professional squash, became inactive, or were permanently banned from playing, during the 2010 season:

- Renan Lavigne (born 1 November 1974 in Longjumeau, France) joined the pro tour in 1996, reached the singles no. 17 spot in October 2004. He won 9 PSA World Tour titles including Colombian Open in 2002 and the Comfort Inn Open in 2006. He retired after losing in the first round of the Saudi World Open in December 2010.

== See also ==
- PSA Super Series 2010
- PSA World Tour
- PSA World Rankings
- PSA World Series Finals
- PSA World Open
- WISPA World Tour 2010
