= 2010 PSA Super Series =

PSA Super Series 2010

Details
- Event name: PSA Super Series 2010
- Website psaworldtour.com/page/SuperSeriesRanking
- Year: World Tour 2010

The PSA Super Series 2010 is a series of men's squash tournaments which are part of the Professional Squash Association (PSA) World Tour for the 2010 squash season. The PSA Super Series tournaments are some of the most prestigious events on the men's tour. The best-performing players in the Super Series events qualify for the annual 2010 PSA World Series Finals tournament. Nick Matthew and Amr Shabana managed to reach the final of the 2010 PSA World Series Squash Finals, but this year there was no winner, because the venue at the Queens Club arena where the final was due to take place was damaged by gales.

== PSA Super Series Ranking Points ==
PSA Super Series events also have a separate World Series ranking. Points for this are calculated on a cumulative basis after each Super Series event. The top eight players at the end of the calendar year are then eligible to play in the PSA World Series Finals.

Tournament			Ranking Points
Rank	Prize Money US$	Ranking Points	Winner	Runner up	3/4	5/8	9/16	17/32
Super Series	$115,000-$274,999	625 points	100	65	40	25	15	10

== 2010 Tournaments ==
Tournament	Country	Location	Rank	Prize money	Date	2010 Winner
Tournament of Champions 2010	United States	New York City	Super Series Silver	$97,500	22–28 January 2010	(England) James Willstrop
North American Open 2010	United States	Richmond, Virginia	Super Series Silver	$93,750	20–26 February 2010	(England) Nick Matthew
Sky Open 2010	Egypt	Cairo	Super Series Platinum	$150,000	17–22 May 2010	(England) Nick Matthew
Australian Open 2010	Australia	Canberra	Super Series Platinum	$142,500	10–15 August 2010	(England) Nick Matthew
Hong Kong Open 2010	Hong Kong	Hong Kong	Super Series Platinum	$147,500	25–29 August 2010	(Egypt) Ramy Ashour
British Grand Prix 2010	England	Manchester	Super Series Silver	$92,500	15–20 September 2010	(Egypt) Ramy Ashour
El Gouna International 2010	Egypt	El Gouna	Super Series Platinum	$142,500	18–24 October 2010	(Egypt) Karim Darwish
Kuwait PSA Cup 2010	Kuwait	Kuwait	Super Series Platinum	$172,500	28 October - 2 November 2010	(Egypt) Ramy Ashour
Qatar Classic 2010	Qatar	Doha	Super Series Platinum	$147,500	7–12 November 2010	(Egypt) Karim Darwish
PSA Masters 2010	India	New Delhi	Super Series Platinum	$192,500	12–18 December 2010	(England) Nick Matthew

== Super Series Standings 2010 ==
Performance Table Legend
10	1st Round	15	2nd Round
25	Quarterfinalist	40	Semifinalist
65	Runner-up	**100**	Winner

**Top 16 Super Series Standings 2010**
Rank	Player	Number of Tournament	Tournament of Champions	North American Open	Sky Open	Australian Open	Hong Kong Open	British Grand Prix	El Gouna International	Kuwait PSA Cup	Qatar Classic	Punj Lloyd PSA Masters	Total Points
Rank	Player	Number of Tournament	USA (United States)	USA (United States)	EGY (Egypt)	AUS (Australia)	HKG (Hong Kong)	ENG (England)	EGY (Egypt)	KUW (Kuwait)	QAT (Qatar)	IND (India)	Total Points
1	(Egypt) **Ramy Ashour**	8	65	65	40	65	**100**	**100**	65	**100**	-	-	**600**
2	(England) **Nick Matthew**	8	40	**100**	**100**	**100**	25	-	-	15	40	**100**	**520**
3	(England) **James Willstrop**	10	**100**	40	25	40	25	65	25	40	25	65	**450**
4	(Egypt) Karim Darwish	8	40	15	65	25	40	-	**100**	25	**100**	-	**410**
5	(Egypt) **Amr Shabana**	10	25	40	15	25	25	25	25	65	65	40	**350**
6	(France) Grégory Gaultier	9	25	25	25	40	65	40	40	40	40	-	**340**
7	(France) **Thierry Lincou**	9	-	25	40	25	25	25	40	25	25	25	**255**
8	(England) **Peter Barker**	8	-	15	25	25	40	-	15	25	25	15	**185**
9	(Egypt) **Wael El Hindi**	9	25	15	25	15	15	-	10	15	10	15	**145**
10	(England) Daryl Selby	8	-	-	10	10	15	25	10	25	25	25	**145**
11	(Australia) David Palmer	7	25	15	15	15	15	40	-	-	15	-	**140**
12	(Botswana) **Alister Walker**	9	15	15	15	10	15	15	10	15	15	-	**125**
13	(Australia) Cameron Pilley	7	-	-	15	15	15	-	25	15	15	25	**125**
14	(Egypt) Hisham Mohd Ashour	7	15	-	10	-	10	15	10	-	10	40	**110**
15	(England) Adrian Grant	7	-	25	15	15	10	15	-	15	15	-	**110**
16	(Netherlands) Laurens Jan Anjema	7	-	-	15	15	15	-	10	15	15	15	**100**

Bold – The first eight players present for the final

Final tournament	Country	Location	Prize money	Date	2010 Super Series Champion
PSA World Series Finals 2010	England	Queen's Club, London	$110,000	11–15 January 2011	(England) Nick Matthew/ (Egypt) Amr Shabana

== See also ==
- PSA World Tour 2010
- PSA World Series
- Official Men's Squash World Ranking
