= 2012 Men's Australian Open (squash) =

Australian Open 2012
- 31st PSA Australian Open

Details
- Event name: Hi-Tec Australian Open 2012
- Location: Canberra Australia
- Venue: National Convention Centre
- Website www.australiansquashopen.com

Men's Winner
- Category: International 70
- Prize money: $70,000
- Year: World Tour 2012

The Men's Australian Open 2012 is the men' edition of the 2012 Australian Open, which is a tournament of the PSA World Tour event International (Prize money: $70,000). The event took place in Canberra in Australia from 13 to 18 August. Ramy Ashour won his second Australian Open trophy, beating Omar Mosaad in the final.

== Prize money and ranking points ==
For 2012, the prize purse was $70,000. The prize money and points breakdown is as follows:

Prize Money Australian Open (2012)
Event	W	F	SF	QF	2R	1R
Points (PSA)	1225	805	490	300	175	90
Prize money	$10,940	$7,185	$4,375	$2,655	$1,565	$780

== Seeds ==
1. (Egypt) Ramy Ashour (champion)
2. (Egypt) Omar Mosaad (final)
3. (England) Tom Richards (semifinals)
4. (Australia) Cameron Pilley (semifinals)
5. (Malaysia) Ong Beng Hee (quarterfinals)
6. (Switzerland) Nicolas Müller (quarterfinals)
7. (Scotland) Alan Clyne (quarterfinals)
8. (Malaysia) Mohd Nafiizwan Adnan (second round)

== Draw and results ==
First round
1	(Egypt) Ramy Ashour	11	11	11
Q	(New Zealand) Kashif Shuja	6	6	6
(England) Oliver Pett	11	11	11
Q	(Hong Kong) Dick Lau	4	5	7
(Hong Kong) Leo Au	11	11	10	11
Q	(Austria) Aqeel Rehmann	7	7	12	6
Q	(Australia) Aaron Frankcomb	5	7	6
6	(Switzerland) Nicolas Müller	11	11	11
8	(Malaysia) Mohd Nafi. Adnan	11	11	11
Q	(Argentina) Gonzalo Miranda	7	5	5
(Egypt) Omar Abdel Aziz	11	2	11	11
(New Zealand) Campbell Grayson	3	11	7	7
(Australia) Zac Alexander	11	7	11	11
WC	(Australia) Rex Hedrick	8	11	2	3
(Australia) Matthew Karwalski	7	5	7
4	(Australia) Cameron Pilley	11	11	11
3	(England) Tom Richards	11	11	14
(Malaysia) Kamran Khan	7	7	12
(Malaysia) Muhd Asyraf Azan	5	9	8
(Australia) Ryan Cuskelly	11	11	11
(New Zealand) Martin Knight	11	11	9	11
Q	(Australia) Justin Beard	5	9	11	4
(India) Siddharth Suchde	7	5	8
7	(Scotland) Alan Clyne	11	11	11
5	(Malaysia) Ong Beng Hee	12	11	11
(Malaysia) Ivan Yuen	10	8	7
(Egypt) Amr Khaled Khalifa	11	11	11
Q	(New Zealand) Evan Williams	10	5	8
(Czech Republic) Jan Koukal	11	11	11
Q	(Australia) Mike Corren	5	2	4
(Hong Kong) Max Lee	2	10	4
2	(Egypt) Omar Mosaad	11	12	11

Second round
1	(Egypt) Ramy Ashour	11	11	11
(England) Oliver Pett	7	4	7
(Hong Kong) Leo Au	11	4	2	2
6	(Switzerland) Nicolas Müller	4	11	11	11
8	(Malaysia) Mohd Nafi. Adnan	3	9	11	6
(Egypt) Omar Abdel Aziz	11	11	7	11
(Australia) Zac Alexander	6	11	9	11	3
4	(Australia) Cameron Pilley	11	9	11	7	11
3	(England) Tom Richards	11	9	11	11
(Australia) Ryan Cuskelly	7	11	4	4
(New Zealand) Martin Knight	7	11	8	11
7	(Scotland) Alan Clyne	11	7	11	11
5	(Malaysia) Ong Beng Hee	11	8	11	11
(Egypt) Amr Khaled Khalifa	9	11	7	7
(Czech Republic) Jan Koukal	7	8	11	10
2	(Egypt) Omar Mosaad	11	11	8	12

Quarter finals
1	(Egypt) Ramy Ashour	10	11	9	11	11
6	(Switzerland) Nicolas Müller	12	4	11	8	1
(Egypt) Omar Abdel Aziz	9	11	7	11	6
4	(Australia) Cameron Pilley	11	9	11	4	11
3	(England) Tom Richards	11	11	11
7	(Scotland) Alan Clyne	7	6	4
5	(Malaysia) Ong Beng Hee	11	5	10
2	(Egypt) Omar Mosaad	13	11	12

Semi finals
1	(Egypt) Ramy Ashour	8	11	11	11
4	(Australia) Cameron Pilley	11	7	7	7
Final
1	(Egypt) Ramy Ashour	11	11	11
2	(Egypt) Omar Mosaad	9	9	6
3	(England) Tom Richards	11	3	3	3
2	(Egypt) Omar Mosaad	9	11	11	11

== See also ==
- PSA World Tour 2012
- Australian Open (squash)
- 2012 Women's Australian Open (squash)
