= Motor City Open 2012 =

- 13th Motor City Open

Details
- Event name: Motor City Open 2012
- Location: Detroit United States
- Venue: Birmingham Athletic Club
- Website themotorcityopen.com

Men's Winner
- Category: World Tour International 50
- Prize money: $50,000
- Year: World Tour 2012

The Motor City Open 2012 is the 2012's Motor City Open (squash), which is a tournament of the PSA World Tour event International (Prize money: $50,000). The event took place at the Birmingham Athletic Club in Detroit in the United States from 27 to 30 January. Ong Beng Hee won his first Motor City Open trophy, beating Hisham Mohd Ashour in the final.

== Prize money and ranking points ==
For 2012, the prize purse was $50,000. The prize money and points breakdown is as follows:

Prize Money Motor City Open (2012)
Event	W	F	SF	QF	1R
Points (PSA)	875	575	350	215	125
Prize money	$8,550	$5,850	$3,825	$2,360	$1,350

== Seeds ==
1. (Egypt) Mohamed El Shorbagy (Semifinals)
2. (Egypt) Hisham Mohd Ashour (Final)
3. (Botswana) Alister Walker (Quarterfinals)
4. (Australia) Cameron Pilley (Quarterfinals)

== Draw and results ==
First round
1	(Egypt) Mohd El Shorbagy	11	11	11
Q	(France) Mathieu Castagnet	4	9	9
(Colombia) Miguel Á. Rodriguez	11	11	11
(Scotland) Alan Clyne	8	6	5
(Malaysia) Ong Beng Hee	10	11	11	7	11
Q	(France) Grégoire Marche	12	3	8	11	8
(Canada) Shahier Razik	6	3	9
4	(Australia) Cameron Pilley	11	11	11
3	(Botswana) Alister Walker	8	11	11	8	11
(Pakistan) Aamir Atlas Khan	11	8	7	11	8
(South Africa) Stephen Coppinger	11	11	13	11
Q	(Egypt) Mohammed Abbas	5	13	11	5
(Malaysia) Mohd Nafi. Adnan	7	10	5
Q	(Hong Kong) Max Lee	11	12	11
(England) Adrian Grant	6	4	11	5
2	(Egypt) Hisham Ashour	11	11	4	11

Quarter finals
(Egypt) Mohd El Shorbagy	11	11	11
(Colombia) Miguel Á. Rodriguez	5	9	8
(Malaysia) Ong Beng Hee	8	13	11	8	11
4	(Australia) Cameron Pilley	11	11	8	11	5
3	(Botswana) Alister Walker	11	3	9	7
(South Africa) Stephen Coppinger	9	11	11	11
Q	(Hong Kong) Max Lee	9	8	5
2	(Egypt) Hisham Ashour	11	11	11

Semi finals
1	(Egypt) Mohd El Shorbagy	9	7	11
(Malaysia) Ong Beng Hee	11	11	13
(South Africa) Stephen Coppinger	11	6	9	9
2	(Egypt) Hisham Ashour	8	11	11	11

Final
(Malaysia) Ong Beng Hee	11	11	11
2	(Egypt) Hisham Ashour	8	9	7

== See also ==
- PSA World Tour 2012
- Motor City Open (squash)
