= Motor City Open 2015 =

- 16th Motor City Open

Details
- Event name: Motor City Open 2015
- Location: Detroit United States
- Venue: Birmingham Athletic Club
- Website themotorcityopen.com

Men's Winner
- Category: World Tour International 70
- Prize money: $70,000
- Year: World Tour 2015

The 2015 Motor City Open is an International 70 tournament of the PSA World Tour. The event took place at the Birmingham Athletic Club in Detroit in the United States from 24 January to 27 January 2015. Miguel Ángel Rodriguez won his first Motor City Open title, beating Stephen Coppinger in the final.

== Prize money and ranking points ==
For 2015, the prize purse was $70,000. The prize money and points breakdown is as follows:

Prize money Motor City Open (2015)
Event	W	F	SF	QF	1R
Points (PSA)	1225	805	490	300	175
Prize money	$12,350	$8,450	$5,525	$3,410	$1,950

== Seeds ==
1. (Egypt) Mohamed El Shorbagy (first round)
2. (Egypt) Amr Shabana (first round)
3. (England) Peter Barker (quarterfinals)
4. (Spain) Borja Golán (quarterfinals)
5. (Egypt) Omar Mosaad (quarterfinals)
6. (Colombia) Miguel Ángel Rodriguez (champion)
7. (Egypt) Marwan El Shorbagy (first round)
8. (France) Mathieu Castagnet (semifinals)

== Draw and results ==
First round
1	(Egypt) Mohamed El Shorbagy	14	4	7	rtd
(Australia) Cameron Pilley	12	11	11
Q	(India) Saurav Ghosal	8	8	11	11	5
6	(Colombia) Miguel Á. Rodriguez	11	11	5	9	11
8	(France) Mathieu Castagnet	11	11	11
Q	(Scotland) Alan Clyne	7	9	3
Q	(Mexico) César Salazar	2	6	7
4	(Spain) Borja Golán	11	11	11
3	(England) Peter Barker	11	11	11
(Switzerland) Nicolas Müller	3	9	4
(South Africa) Stephen Coppinger	8	4	11	12	11
7	(Egypt) Marwan El Shorbagy	11	11	5	10	6
5	(Egypt) Omar Mosaad	11	11	11
Q	(Finland) Olli Tuominen	7	5	5
(Hong Kong) Max Lee	11	11
2	(Egypt) Amr Shabana	6	5	rtd

Quarter finals
(Australia) Cameron Pilley	11	7	6	9
6	(Colombia) Miguel Á. Rodriguez	6	11	11	11
8	(France) Mathieu Castagnet	11	11	11
4	(Spain) Borja Golán	7	8	6
3	(England) Peter Barker	11	4	11	7	5
(South Africa) Stephen Coppinger	7	11	5	11	11
5	(Egypt) Omar Mosaad	11	6	11	6	9
(Hong Kong) Max Lee	9	11	6	11	11

Semi finals
6	(Colombia) Miguel Á. Rodriguez	7	11	8	11	11
8	(France) Mathieu Castagnet	11	4	11	7	2
(South Africa) Stephen Coppinger	9	11	11	8	11
(Hong Kong) Max Lee	11	5	8	11	7

Final
6	(Colombia) Miguel Á. Rodriguez	9	11	8	11	11
(South Africa) Stephen Coppinger	11	7	11	7	3

== See also ==
- 2015 PSA World Tour
- Motor City Open (squash)
