= Swedish Squash Open 2012 =

Swedish Open 2012
- 9th Swedish Open

Details
- Event name: Case Swedish Open 2012
- Location: Linköping Sweden
- Venue: Linköping Sporthalle
- Website www.swedishopensquash.se

Men's Winner
- Category: World Tour International 70
- Prize money: $70,000
- Year: World Tour 2012

The Case Swedish Open 2012 is the 2012's Swedish Open, which is a tournament of the PSA World Tour event International (Prize money : 70 000 $). The event took place in Linköping in Sweden from 2 to 5 February. Grégory Gaultier won his first Swedish Open trophy, beating Karim Darwish in the final.

== Prize money and ranking points ==
For 2012, the prize purse was $70,000. The prize money and points breakdown is as follows:

Prize Money Swedish Open (2012)
Event	W	F	SF	QF	1R
Points (PSA)	1225	805	490	300	175
Prize money	$11,875	$8,125	$5,315	$3,280	$1,875

== Seeds ==
1. (France) Grégory Gaultier (champion)
2. (Egypt) Karim Darwish (final)
3. (England) Peter Barker (semifinals)
4. (France) Thierry Lincou (first round)

== Draw and results ==
First round
1	(France) Grégory Gaultier	11	11	11
(India) Saurav Ghosal	8	3	6
(England) Tom Richards	6	6	11	11	12
Q	(England) Chris Simpson	11	11	7	8	10
(South Africa) Stephen Coppinger	11	8	7	14	11
Q	(New Zealand) Campbell Grayson	9	11	11	12	4
WC	(Sweden) Rasmus Hult	4	8	7
3	(England) Peter Barker	11	11	11
4	(France) Thierry Lincou	11	11	9	7	3
(England) Daryl Selby	4	9	11	11	11
(Germany) Simon Rösner	11	11	11
Q	(Egypt) Amr Khaled Khalifa	5	9	5
(Malaysia) Mohd Nafi. Adnan	8	11	9	10
(Switzerland) Nicolas Müller	11	9	11	12
Q	(Finland) Henrik Mustonen	7	7	4
2	(Egypt) Karim Darwish	11	11	11

Quarter finals
1	(France) Grégory Gaultier	11	11	11
(England) Tom Richards	6	2	5
(South Africa) Stephen Coppinger	5	4	5
3	(England) Peter Barker	11	11	12
(England) Daryl Selby	2	11	11	11
(Germany) Simon Rösner	11	8	8	5
(Switzerland) Nicolas Müller	5	7	11	10
2	(Egypt) Karim Darwish	11	11	6	12

Semi finals
1	(France) Grégory Gaultier	11	11	11
3	(England) Peter Barker	1	3	2
(England) Daryl Selby	2	2	11	8
2	(Egypt) Karim Darwish	11	11	6	11

Final
1	(France) Grégory Gaultier	11	11	11
2	(Egypt) Karim Darwish	3	6	8

== See also ==
- PSA World Tour 2012
- Swedish Open (squash)
