= Bluenose Squash Classic 2012 =

- 7th Bluenose Squash Classic

Details
- Event name: Bluenose Squash Classic 2012
- Location: Halifax, Canada
- Website squashns.ca

Men's Winner
- Category: World Tour International 50
- Prize money: $55,000
- Year: World Tour 2012

The Bluenose Squash Classic 2012 is the 2012's Bluenose Classic, which is a tournament of the PSA World Tour event International (Prize money : 55 000 $). The event took place in Halifax, Canada, from 28 March to 1 April. Thierry Lincou won his second Bluenose Squash Classic trophy, beating Daryl Selby in the final.

== Prize money and ranking points ==
For 2012, the prize purse was $55,000. The prize money and points breakdown is as follows:

Prize Money Bluenose Squash Classic (2012)
Event	W	F	SF	QF	1R
Points (PSA)	875	575	350	215	125
Prize money	$9,025	$6,175	$4,035	$2,495	$1,425

== Seeds ==
1. (Egypt) Amr Shabana (Quarterfinals)
2. (Netherlands) Laurens Jan Anjema (Semifinals)
3. (Egypt) Hisham Mohd Ashour (Semifinals)
4. (England) Daryl Selby (Final)

== Draw and results ==
First round
1	(Egypt) Amr Shabana	11	11	11
Q	(England) Chris Simpson	9	10	4
(France) Thierry Lincou	11	11	11
(New Zealand) Martin Knight	2	9	4
(South Africa) Stephen Coppinger	11	11	11
WC	(Canada) Andrew Schnell	6	8	2
(Canada) Shahier Razik	3	4	0
3	(Egypt) Hisham Ashour	11	11	2
4	(England) Daryl Selby	11	11	11
Q	(Mexico) Cesar Salazar	6	3	8
(Spain) Borja Golán	11	11	11
Q	(Czech Republic) Jan Koukal	5	4	7
(United States) Julian Illingworth	11	9	10	12	11
Q	(Canada) Shawn Delierre	2	11	12	10	8
(Australia) Cameron Pilley	7	10	11	8
2	(Netherlands) Laurens Jan Anjema	11	11	7	11

Quarter finals
1	(Egypt) Amr Shabana	11	8	6	9
(France) Thierry Lincou	6	11	11	11
(South Africa) Stephen Coppinger	8	9	11	6
3	(Egypt) Hisham Ashour	11	11	6	11
4	(England) Daryl Selby	11	11	11
(Spain) Borja Golán	6	7	7
(United States) Julian Illingworth	4	11	7
2	(Netherlands) Laurens Jan Anjema	11	13	11

Semi finals
(France) Thierry Lincou	12	11	11
3	(Egypt) Hisham Mohd Ashour	10	5	5
4	(England) Daryl Selby	11	11	11
2	(Netherlands) Laurens Jan Anjema	7	8	7

Final
(France) Thierry Lincou	9	11	9	11	11
4	(England) Daryl Selby	11	8	11	5	4

== See also ==
- PSA World Tour 2012
- Bluenose Classic
