= British Grand Prix (squash) 2012 =

British Grand Prix 2012
- 7th British Grand Prix

Details
- Event name: British Grand Prix 2012
- Location: Manchester, England
- Venue: National Squash Centre
- Website www.britishsquashgrandprix.com

Men's Winner
- Category: International 70
- Prize money: $70,000
- Year: World Tour 2012

The British Grand Prix 2012 is the 2012's British Grand Prix (squash), which is a tournament of the PSA World Tour event International (Prize money : $70 000 ). The event took place at the National Squash Centre in Manchester in England from 21 to 24 September. Nick Matthew won his first British Grand Prix trophy, beating James Willstrop in the final.

== Prize money and ranking points ==
For 2012, the prize purse was $70,000. The prize money and points breakdown is as follows:

Prize Money British Grand Prix (2012)
Event	W	F	SF	QF	1R
Points (PSA)	1225	805	490	300	175
Prize money	$11,875	$8,125	$5,315	$3,280	$1,875

== Seeds ==
1. (England) James Willstrop (Final)
2. (England) Nick Matthew (Champion)
3. (France) Grégory Gaultier (Semifinals)
4. (England) Peter Barker (Semifinals)

== Draw and results ==
* First round *
1	(England) James Willstrop	11	11	11
(England) Daryl Selby	8	7	4
(Netherlands) Laurens Jan Anjema	11	11	11
WC	(Germany) Jens Schoor	7	4	6
(Germany) Simon Rösner	11	11	11
Q	(France) Mathieu Castagnet	6	3	5
Q	(England) Adrian Waller	6	7	4
3	(France) Grégory Gaultier	11	11	11
4	(England) Peter Barker	11	7	12	11
(Spain) Borja Golán	8	11	10	2
(England) Adrian Grant	7	7	11	12	11
Q	(India) Saurav Ghosal	11	11	3	10	6
(Botswana) Alister Walker	11	14	11
Q	(England) Chris Simpson	7	12	3
(England) Tom Richards	12	10	0
2	(England) Nick Matthew	14	12	11

* Quarter finals *
1	(England) James Willstrop	8	11	11	11
(Netherlands) Laurens Jan Anjema	11	5	3	5
(Germany) Simon Rösner	10	12	5	7
3	(France) Grégory Gaultier	12	10	11	11
4	(England) Peter Barker	11	11	11
(England) Adrian Grant	8	1	3
(Botswana) Alister Walker	11	8	4	3
2	(England) Nick Matthew	9	11	11	11

Semi finals
1	(England) James Willstrop *	7	11	11	15	15
3	(France) Grégory Gaultier	11	6	4	17	13
4	(England) Peter Barker	6	7	3
2	(England) Nick Matthew *	11	11	11

Final
1	(England) James Willstrop	11	6	9	5
2	(England) Nick Matthew *	4	11	11	11

== See also ==
- PSA World Tour 2012
- British Grand Prix (squash)
