= Netsuite Open 2012 =

- 2nd Netsuite Open

Details
- Event name: Netsuite Open 2012
- Location: San Francisco United States
- Venue: Standford Squash
- Website www.netsuiteopen.com

Men's Winner
- Category: International 70
- Prize money: $70,000
- Year: World Tour 2012

The Netsuite Open 2012 is the 2012's Netsuite Open, which is a tournament of the PSA World Tour event International (Prize money : 70 000 $). The event took place at the Standford Squash in San Francisco in the United States from 19 October to 23 October. Grégory Gaultier won his first Netsuite Open trophy, beating Nick Matthew in the final.

== Prize money and ranking points ==
For 2012, the prize purse was $70,000. The prize money and points breakdown is as follows:

Prize Money Netsuite Open (2012)
Event	W	F	SF	QF	1R
Points (PSA)	1225	805	490	300	175
Prize money	$11,875	$8,125	$5,315	$3,280	$1,875

== Seeds ==
1. (England) James Willstrop (Quarterfinals)
2. (England) Nick Matthew (Final)
3. (France) Grégory Gaultier (Champion)
4. (England) Peter Barker (Semifinals)

== Draw and results ==
First round
1	(England) James Willstrop	11	11	11
Q	(Scotland) Alan Clyne	4	9	9
(Botswana) Alister Walker	8	11	3	5
(Egypt) Amr Shabana	11	5	11	11
(Egypt) Tarek Momen	11	11	11
Q	(France) Grégoire Marche	7	3	7
(Switzerland) Nicolas Müller	4	11	1	1
3	(France) Grégory Gaultier	11	7	11	11
4	(England) Peter Barker	11	11	11
(Egypt) Hisham Ashour	6	4	3
(Netherlands) Laurens Jan Anjema	11	11	11
Q	(England) Chris Simpson	6	4	3
(England) Daryl Selby	11	11	11
Q	(New Zealand) Martin Knight	10	7	4
WC	(United States) Julian Illingworth	8	9	3
2	(England) Nick Matthew	11	11	11

Quarter finals
1	(England) James Willstrop	8	8	9
(Egypt) Amr Shabana	11	11	11
(Egypt) Tarek Momen	4	7	11	10
3	(France) Grégory Gaultier	11	11	7	12
4	(England) Peter Barker	11	11	11
(Netherlands) Laurens Jan Anjema	7	4	4
(England) Daryl Selby	6	10	4
2	(England) Nick Matthew	11	11	11

Semi finals
(Egypt) Amr Shabana	7	10	8
3	(France) Grégory Gaultier	11	11	11
4	(England) Peter Barker	7	5	11	6
2	(England) Nick Matthew	11	11	6	11

Final
3	(France) Grégory Gaultier	11	13	11
2	(England) Nick Matthew	7	11	9

== See also ==
- PSA World Tour 2012
- Netsuite Open
