= Motor City Open 2016 =

- 17th Motor City Open

Details
- Event name: Motor City Open 2016
- Location: Detroit, Michigan, United States
- Venue: Birmingham Athletic Club
- Website themotorcityopen.com

Men's Winner
- Category: World Tour International 70
- Prize money: $70,000
- Year: World Tour 2016

The 2016 Motor City Open is an International 70 tournament of the PSA World Tour. This 2016 edition of the Motor City Open took place at the Birmingham Athletic Club in Detroit, Michigan, in the United States on January 22–25, 2016. Ali Farag won his first Motor City Open title, beating Nick Matthew in the final.

== Prize money and ranking points ==
For 2016, the prize purse was $70,000. The prize money and points breakdown is as follows:

Prize Money Motor City Open (2016)
Event	W	F	SF	QF	1R
Points (PSA)	1225	805	490	300	175
Prize money	$12,350	$8,450	$5,525	$3,410	$1,950

== Seeds ==
1. (Egypt) Mohamed El Shorbagy (quarterfinals)
2. (England) Nick Matthew (final)
3. (France) Mathieu Castagnet (semifinals)
4. (Hong Kong) Max Lee (first round)
5. (Australia) Ryan Cuskelly (quarterfinals)
6. (Spain) Borja Golán (semifinals)
7. (Egypt) Ali Farag (champion)
8. (England) Chris Simpson (quarterfinals)

== Draw and results ==
First round
1	(Egypt) Mohd El Shorbagy	11	11	6	11
(England) Adrian Waller	9	9	11	8
Q	(Peru) Diego Elías	9	4	1
7	(Egypt) Ali Farag	11	11	11
5	(Australia) Ryan Cuskelly
Q	(Pakistan) Nasir Iqbal	wo
Q	(Finland) Olli Tuominen	4	6	11	4
3	(France) Mathieu Castagnet	11	11	9	11
4	(Hong Kong) Max Lee	6	7	9
Q	(Hong Kong) Leo Au	11	11	11
(France) Grégoire Marche	3	8	4
6	(Spain) Borja Golán	11	11	11
8	(England) Chris Simpson	13	11	19
(Switzerland) Nicolas Müller	11	1	17
(Egypt) Mohamed Abouelghar	8	9	12	11	9
2	(England) Nick Matthew	11	11	10	9	11

Quarter finals
1	(Egypt) Mohamed El Shorbagy	11	9	7	11	6
7	(Egypt) Ali Farag	6	11	11	8	11
5	(Australia) Ryan Cuskelly	9	11	11	9	2
3	(France) Mathieu Castagnet	11	7	5	11	11
Q	(Hong Kong) Leo Au	4	2	5
6	(Spain) Borja Golán	11	11	11
8	(England) Chris Simpson	6	6	7
2	(England) Nick Matthew	11	11	11

Semi finals
7	(Egypt) Ali Farag	12	9	11	11
3	(France) Mathieu Castagnet	10	11	4	9
6	(Spain) Borja Golán	8	11	8	7
2	(England) Nick Matthew	11	9	11	11

Final
7	(Egypt) Ali Farag	11	5	11	11
2	(England) Nick Matthew	7	11	6	7
