= British Grand Prix (squash) 2015 =

British Grand Prix 2015
- 9th British Grand Prix

Details
- Event name: British Grand Prix 2015
- Location: Manchester, England
- Venue: National Squash Centre
- Website www.britishsquashgrandprix.com

Men's Winner
- Category: International 70
- Prize money: $70,000
- Year: World Tour 2015

The British Grand Prix 2015 is the British Grand Prix (squash) for 2015, which is a tournament of the PSA World Tour event International (Prize money : 70 000 $). The event took place at the National Squash Centre in Manchester in England from 11 September to 14 September. Mohamed El Shorbagy won his first British Grand Prix trophy, beating Nick Matthew in the final.

== Prize money and ranking points ==
For 2015, the prize purse was $70,000. The prize money and points breakdown is as follows:

Prize Money British Grand Prix (2015)
Event	W	F	SF	QF	1R
Points (PSA)	1225	805	490	300	175
Prize money	$11,875	$8,125	$5,315	$3,280	$1,875

== Seeds ==
1. (Egypt) Mohamed El Shorbagy (Champion)
2. (England) Nick Matthew (Final)
3. (France) Grégory Gaultier (Semifinals)
4. (Colombia) Miguel Ángel Rodríguez (Quarterfinals)
5. (England) Peter Barker (Quarterfinals)
6. (Egypt) Karim Abdel Gawad (Semifinals)
7. (England) Daryl Selby (Quarterfinals)
8. (England) James Willstrop (Quarterfinals)

== Draw and results ==
First round
1	(Egypt) Mohd El Shorbagy *	11	11	11
WC	(England) Richie Fallows	4	7	7
(Australia) Cameron Pilley	8	3	9
7	(England) Daryl Selby *	11	11	11
5	(England) Peter Barker *	11	11	8	11
Q	(Mexico) César Salazar	7	5	11	2
Q	(Scotland) Alan Clyne	14	7	6
3	(France) Grégory Gaultier *	16	11	11
4	(Colombia) Miguel Á. Rodríguez *	11	11	11
Q	(France) Grégoire Marche	9	8	6
(England) Tom Richards	11	9	11	6	2
6	(Egypt) Karim Abdel Gawad *	8	11	7	11	11
8	(England) James Willstrop *	11	4	11	11
Q	(Netherlands) Laurens Jan Anjema	8	11	5	6
(England) Chris Simpson	4	7	6
2	(England) Nick Matthew *	11	11	11

Quarter finals
1	(Egypt) Mohd El Shorbagy *	6	11	11	11
7	(England) Daryl Selby	11	7	7	7
5	(England) Peter Barker	4	7	4
3	(France) Grégory Gaultier *	11	11	11
4	(Colombia) Miguel Ángel Rodríguez	7	13	11	11	3
6	(Egypt) Karim Abdel Gawad *	11	15	4	3	11
8	(England) James Willstrop	7	5	7
2	(England) Nick Matthew *	11	11	11

Semi finals
1	(Egypt) Mohd El Shorbagy *	7	11	11	6	11
3	(France) Grégory Gaultier	11	7	9	11	8
6	(Egypt) Karim Abdel Gawad	7	6	11
2	(England) Nick Matthew *	11	11	13

Final
1	(Egypt) Mohd El Shorbagy *	11	12	9	11
2	(England) Nick Matthew	7	10	11	6

== See also ==
- 2015 PSA World Tour
- British Grand Prix (squash)
