= Men's Macau Open 2012 =

Macau Open 2012
- 7th PSA Macau Open

Details
- Event name: Macau Open 2012
- Location: Macau China

Men's Winner
- Category: International 50
- Prize money: $50,000
- Year: World Tour 2012

The Men's Macau Open 2012 is the men's edition of the 2012 Macau Open (squash), which is a tournament of the PSA World Tour event International (Prize money: $50,000). The event took place in Macau in China from 18 to 21 October. Karim Darwish won his first Macau Open trophy, beating Mohamed El Shorbagy in the final.

== Prize money and ranking points ==
For 2012, the prize purse was $50,000. The prize money and points breakdown is as follows:

Prize Money Macau Open (2012)
Event	W	F	SF	QF	1R
Points (PSA)	875	575	350	215	125
Prize money	$8,075	$5,525	$3,615	$2,230	$1,275

== Seeds ==
1. (Egypt) Karim Darwish (Champion)
2. (Egypt) Mohamed El Shorbagy (Final)
3. (Egypt) Omar Mosaad (Quarterfinals)
4. (England) Tom Richards (Quarterfinals)

== Draw and results ==
First round
1	(Egypt) Karim Darwish	11	11	11
(Malaysia) Ong Beng Hee	8	6	9
(France) Mathieu Castagnet	4	6	11	12
Q	(Egypt) Karim Ali Fathi	11	11	6	14
(Egypt) Karim Abdel Gawad	11	11	9	11
Q	(Malaysia) Muhd Asyraf Azan	9	3	11	5
(Malaysia) Mohd Nafi. Adnan	9	11	8	11
4	(England) Tom Richards	11	9	11	13
3	(Egypt) Omar Mosaad	11	11	11
Q	(Egypt) Omar Abdel Meguid	5	7	2
(Egypt) Marwan El Shorbagy	11	8	11	11
(Finland) Olli Tuominen	7	11	6	5
(Hong Kong) Max Lee	11	11	11
(Macau) Armando Amante	4	4	4
Q	(Finland) Henrik Mustonen	8	9	11	12	9
2	(Egypt) Mohd El Shorbagy	11	11	8	10	11

Quarter finals
1	(Egypt) Karim Darwish	11	11	11
Q	(Egypt) Karim Ali Fathi	5	9	6
(Egypt) Karim Abdel Gawad	11	11	11
4	(England) Tom Richards	7	5	9
3	(Egypt) Omar Mosaad	6	3	5
(Egypt) Marwan El Shorbagy	11	11	11
(Hong Kong) Max Lee	8	6	7
2	(Egypt) Mohd El Shorbagy	11	11	11

Semi finals
1	(Egypt) Karim Darwish	11	9	11	11
(Egypt) Karim Abdel Gawad	1	11	5	3
(Egypt) Marwan El Shorbagy	4	12	3	9
2	(Egypt) Mohd El Shorbagy	11	10	11	11

Final
1	(Egypt) Karim Darwish	9	11	10	11	11
2	(Egypt) Mohd El Shorbagy	11	7	12	4	9

== See also ==
- PSA World Tour 2012
- Macau Open (squash)
