= Women's Netsuite Open 2016 =

Netsuite Open 2016
- 6th Women's Netsuite Open

Details
- Event name: Netsuite Open 2016
- Location: San Francisco United States
- Venue: Justin Herman Plaza
- Website www.netsuiteopen.com

Men's Winner
- Category: International 50
- Prize money: $50,000
- Year: World Tour 2016

The Women's Netsuite Open 2016 is the women's edition of the 2016 Netsuite Open, which is a tournament of the PSA World Tour event International (Prize money : $50,000). The event took place at the Justin Herman Plaza in San Francisco in the United States from 27 of September to 1 October. Laura Massaro won her first Netsuite Open trophy, beating Amanda Sobhy in the final.

== Prize money and ranking points ==
For 2016, the prize purse was $50,000. The prize money and points breakdown was as follows:

Prize Money Netsuite Open (2016)
Event	W	F	SF	QF	1R
Points (PSA)	875	575	350	215	125
Prize money	$8,075	$5,525	$3,615	$2,230	$1,275

== Seeds ==
1. (England) Laura Massaro (Champion)
2. (Malaysia) Nicol David (Semifinals)
3. (United States) Amanda Sobhy (Final)
4. (New Zealand) Joelle King (Semifinals)
5. (England) Victoria Lust (Quarterfinals)
6. (Egypt) Nour El Tayeb (Quarterfinals)
7. (Hong Kong) Joey Chan (Quarterfinals)
8. (Egypt) Heba El Torky (Quarterfinals)

== Draw and results ==
First round
1	(England) Laura Massaro	11	11	11
(United States) Olivia Blatchford	6	6	8
Q	(Australia) Sarah Cardwell	8	11	11
5	(England) Victoria Lust	11	13	13
8	(Egypt) Heba El Torky	11	9	11	11
Q	(Mexico) Samantha Terán	7	11	5	8
(Denmark) Line Hansen	11	9	8
4	(New Zealand) Joelle King	13	11	11
3	(United States) Amanda Sobhy	11	10	11	11
Q	(England) Fiona Moverley	5	12	9	4
(France) Coline Aumard	11	0	7	11	9
7	(Hong Kong) Joey Chan	8	11	11	6	11
6	(Egypt) Nour El Tayeb	11	9	11	11
Q	(Malaysia) Low Wee Wern	3	11	4	1
WC	(United States) Reyna Pacheco	3	1	3
2	(Malaysia) Nicol David	11	11	11

Quarter finals
1	(England) Laura Massaro	11	11	11
5	(England) Victoria Lust	3	7	9
8	(Egypt) Heba El Torky	8	4	6
4	(New Zealand) Joelle King	11	11	11
3	(United States) Amanda Sobhy	11	12	11
7	(Hong Kong) Joey Chan	3	10	2
6	(Egypt) Nour El Tayeb	9	6	0	rtd
2	(Malaysia) Nicol David	11	11	7

Semi finals
1	(England) Laura Massaro	12	11	11
4	(New Zealand) Joelle King	10	5	4
4	(United States) Amanda Sobhy	10	11	11	11
2	(Malaysia) Nicol David	12	5	2	5

Final
1	(England) Laura Massaro	11	9	11	11
4	(United States) Amanda Sobhy	4	11	8	7

== See also ==
- 2016 PSA World Tour
- Netsuite Open
- Men's Netsuite Open 2016
