= Men's Netsuite Open 2016 =

Netsuite Open 2016
- 6th Men's Netsuite Open

Details
- Event name: Netsuite Open 2016
- Location: San Francisco United States
- Venue: Justin Herman Plaza
- Website www.netsuiteopen.com

Men's Winner
- Category: International 100
- Prize money: $100,000
- Year: World Tour 2016

The Men's Netsuite Open 2016 is the men's edition of the 2016 Netsuite Open, which is a tournament of the PSA World Tour event International (prize money: $100,000). The event took place at the Justin Herman Plaza in San Francisco in the United States from 27 of September to 1 October. Grégory Gaultier won his third Netsuite Open trophy, beating James Willstrop in the final.

== Prize money and ranking points ==
For 2016, the prize purse was $100,000. The prize money and points breakdown is as follows:

Prize money Netsuite Open (2016)
Event	W	F	SF	QF	1R
Points (PSA)	1750	1150	700	430	250
Prize money	$17,575	$12,025	$7,860	$4,855	$2,775

== Seeds ==
1. (France) Grégory Gaultier (champion)
2. (England) Nick Matthew (first round)
3. (Colombia) Miguel Ángel Rodríguez (first round)
4. (Egypt) Marwan El Shorbagy (semifinals)
5. (Egypt) Ali Farag (first round)
6. (Germany) Simon Rösner (quarterfinals)
7. (Australia) Cameron Pilley (quarterfinals)
8. (Australia) Ryan Cuskelly (quarterfinals)

== Draw and results ==
First round
1	(France) Grégory Gaultier	11	11	11
(India) Saurav Ghosal	9	4	1
(Hong Kong) Max Lee	11	12	4	9
8	(Australia) Ryan Cuskelly	9	14	11	11
7	(Australia) Cameron Pilley	12	11	2	11
(South Africa) Stephen Coppinger	10	8	11	7
Q	(Switzerland) Nicolas Müller	8	11	8	7
4	(Egypt) Marwan El Shorbagy	11	9	11	11
3	(Colombia) Miguel Á. Rodríguez	10	6	4
WC	(England) James Willstrop	12	11	11
Q	(Qatar) Abdulla Al Tamimi	7	6	11	4
6	(Germany) Simon Rösner	11	11	8	11
5	(Egypt) Ali Farag	11	11	7	9	7
Q	(Peru) Diego Elías	8	6	11	11	11
Q	(France) Grégoire Marche	11	11	11
2	(England) Nick Matthew	5	3	8

Quarter finals
1	(France) Grégory Gaultier	11	11	11
8	(Australia) Ryan Cuskelly	6	9	6
7	(Australia) Cameron Pilley	2	11	5	5
4	(Egypt) Marwan El Shorbagy	11	7	11	11
WC	(England) James Willstrop	9	9	11	11	12
6	(Germany) Simon Rösner	11	11	9	2	10
Q	(Peru) Diego Elías	11	11	11
Q	(France) Grégoire Marche	8	9	4

Semi finals
1	(France) Grégory Gaultier	11	11	14
4	(Egypt) Marwan El Shorbagy	3	7	12
WC	(England) James Willstrop	11	11	11
Q	(Peru) Diego Elías	5	3	6

Final
1	(France) Grégory Gaultier	11	11	14
WC	(England) James Willstrop	9	2	12

== See also ==
- 2016 PSA World Tour
- Netsuite Open
- Women's Netsuite Open 2016
