= Motor City Open (squash) =

Details
- Event name: Motor City Open
- Location: Bloomfield Hills, Michigan, United States
- Venue: Birmingham Athletic Club
- Website themotorcityopen.com

Men's Winner
- Category: International 70
- Prize money: $90,500
- Current: Motor City Open 2024

The Motor City Open is an annual international squash championship held in Bloomfield Hills, Michigan. The tournament is hosted and organized by the Birmingham Athletic Club, a private club in Bloomfield Hills, Michigan, and has been held each year since 1999, with the exception of 2008, when the event was moved from November to the following January.

The Motor City Open is usually scheduled immediately to follow the Tournament of Champions held in New York City. The tournament takes place over six days. The first two days consist of a qualifying competition, where 16 competitors compete for four places in the main draw. After the qualification rounds, the four qualifiers join the 12 exempt players in the main draw.

In addition to the main draw, the Motor City Open also features a pro-am doubles competition and a clinic for juniors conducted by the professionals. The event also conducts a silent auction to raise funds for charity. In recent years, this charity has been the Barbara Ann Karmanos Cancer Institute.

== Past winners ==
Listed below are the results from the Motor City Open:

Year	Champion	Runner-up	Score in final
1999	(England) Peter Marshall	(Australia) David Palmer	15–10, 15–7, 15–12
2000	(Australia) David Palmer	(Wales) Alex Gough	12–15, 15–10, 15–11, 15–10
2001	(Netherlands) Tommy Berden	(Belgium) Stefan Casteleyn	10-15, 15-12, 15-11, 12-15, 15-12
2002	(England) Nick Taylor	(Canada) Graham Ryding	15–6, 12–15, 15–9, 15–9
2003	(Canada) Jonathon Power	(France) Thierry Lincou	15–11, 12–15, 15–10, 15–4
2004	(France) Grégory Gaultier	(Finland) Olli Tuominen	11–4, 11–10 (2–0), 3–11, 11–3
2005	(Canada) Jonathon Power	(Scotland) John White	11–2, 11–7, 11–6
2006	(Scotland) John White	(Republic of Ireland) Liam Kenny	11–3, 11–4, 11–6
2007	(Finland) Olli Tuominen	(Australia) Stewart Boswell	11–7, 11–6, 11–2
2008	No competition		
2009	(Spain) Borja Golán	(England) Adrian Grant	10–12, 11–9, 11–5, 14–12
2010	(Egypt) Karim Darwish	(Malaysia) Mohd Azlan Iskandar	11–3, 11–7, 11–4
2011	(Egypt) Mohamed El Shorbagy	(Egypt) Omar Mosaad	8-11, 11-6, 11-8, 11-5
2012	(Malaysia) Ong Beng Hee	(Egypt) Hisham Ashour	11-8, 11-9, 11-7
2013	(Egypt) Amr Shabana	(Egypt) Karim Darwish	11-4, 2-6 rtd
2014	(Egypt) Mohamed El Shorbagy	(England) Peter Barker	8-11, 12-14, 11-4, 11-6, 11-7
2015	(Colombia) Miguel Ángel Rodriguez	(South Africa) Stephen Coppinger	9-11, 11-7, 8-11, 11-7, 11-3
2016	(Egypt) Ali Farag	(England) Nick Matthew	11-7, 5-11, 11-6, 11-7
2017	(Australia) Ryan Cuskelly	(Egypt) Ali Farag	4–11, 11–5, 11–5, 11–9
2018	(Egypt) Marwan El Shorbagy	(New Zealand) Paul Coll	11-9, 11-9-13, 11-8, 11-8-13, 11-9
2019	(Egypt) Mohamed Abouelghar	(Peru) Diego Elías	5-11, 11-6, 11-3, 4-11, 11-8
2020	(Peru) Diego Elías	(Egypt) Mohamed ElSherbini	11-4, 11-5, 11-4
2021	There was no tournament in 2021 due to the Covid pandemic		
2022	(Peru) Diego Elías	(Egypt) Fares Dessouky	11-5, 11-8, 11-9
2023	(Peru) Diego Elías	(Egypt) Mazen Hesham	11-3, 11-4, 6-11, 11-3
2024	(Peru) Diego Elías	(New Zealand) Paul Coll	11-8, 11-9, 11-6
2025	(New Zealand) Paul Coll	(New Zealand) Leonel Cárdenas	8–11, 12–10, 11–9, 11–9
2026	(England) Marwan El Shorbagy	(Peru) Diego Elías	13–11, 11–5, 11–8
