= Laurence Delasaux =

English squash player (born 1985)

Personal information
- Born: 31 March 1985 (age 41) Kingston upon Hull, United Kingdom
- Height: 1.88 m (6 ft 2 in)

Sport
- Country: England
- Turned pro: 2009
- Racquet used: Dunlop

Men's singles
- Highest ranking: 65 (October 2010)
- Title: 6
- Tour final: 12

Laurence Delasaux (born 31 March 1985) is a former English squash player. He achieved his highest career ranking of 65 in October 2010 during the 2010 PSA World Tour. Laurence moved to Toronto and became a coaching professional after retiring from international squash in 2012.
