= Swedish Squash Open 2015 =

Swedish Open 2015
- 12th Swedish Open

Details
- Event name: Case Swedish Open 2015
- Location: Linköping Sweden
- Venue: Linköpings Sporthall
- Website www.swedishopensquash.se

Men's Winner
- Category: World Tour International 70
- Prize money: $70,000
- Year: World Tour 2015

The Case Swedish Open 2015 is the Swedish Open for 2015, which is a tournament of the PSA World Tour event International (prize money: $70,000). The event took place in Linköping in Sweden from 5 February to 8 February. Nick Matthew won his fifth Swedish Open trophy, beating Grégory Gaultier in the final.

== Prize money and ranking points ==
For 2015, the prize purse was $70,000. The prize money and points breakdown is as follows:

Prize money Swedish Open (2015)
Event	W	F	SF	QF	1R
Points (PSA)	1225	805	490	300	175
Prize money	$11,875	$8,125	$5,315	$3,280	$1,875

== Seeds ==
1. (France) Grégory Gaultier (final)
2. (England) Nick Matthew (champion)
3. (England) James Willstrop (quarterfinals)
4. (Germany) Simon Rösner (semifinals)
5. (Egypt) Marwan El Shorbagy (quarterfinals)
6. (Switzerland) Nicolas Müller (first round)
7. (Australia) Cameron Pilley (quarterfinals)
8. (South Africa) Stephen Coppinger (semifinals)

== Draw and results ==
1* First round 2*
1	(France) Grégory Gaultier	11	11	11
(Egypt) Fares Dessouky	5	6	6
Q	(England) Tom Richards	9	11	11	11
6	(Switzerland) Nicolas Müller	11	1	8	5
8	(South Africa) Stephen Coppinger	12	11	11
WC	(Sweden) Rasmus Hult	10	7	8
(England) Chris Simpson	9	11	11	4	8
3	(England) James Willstrop	11	7	7	11	11
4	(Germany) Simon Rösner	12	11	14	14
(England) Adrian Waller	14	6	12	12
Q	(South Africa) Shaun Le Roux	9	11	6	7
5	(Egypt) Marwan El Shorbagy	11	5	11	11
7	(Australia) Cameron Pilley	11	11	11
Q	(England) Joe Lee	5	9	3
Q	(Finland) Olli Tuominen	5	4	4
2	(England) Nick Matthew	11	11	11

1* Quarter finals 2*
1	(France) Grégory Gaultier	11	11	11
Q	(England) Tom Richards	7	7	4
8	(South Africa) Stephen Coppinger	11	11	11	11
3	(England) James Willstrop	7	9	13	7
4	(Germany) Simon Rösner	11	11	11
5	(Egypt) Marwan El Shorbagy	6	6	4
7	(Australia) Cameron Pilley	10	8	10
2	(England) Nick Matthew	12	11	12

Semi finals *
1	(France) Grégory Gaultier	11	11	11
8	(South Africa) Stephen Coppinger	4	3	6
4	(Germany) Simon Rösner	7	11	5	11
2	(England) Nick Matthew	11	7	11	13

Final
1	(France) Grégory Gaultier	9	8	7
2	(England) Nick Matthew *	11	11	11

== See also ==
- 2015 PSA World Tour
- Swedish Open (squash)
