= Netsuite Open 2015 =

- 5th Netsuite Open

Details
- Event name: Netsuite Open 2015
- Location: San Francisco United States
- Venue: Justin Herman Plaza
- Website www.netsuiteopen.com

Men's Winner
- Category: International 100
- Prize money: $100,000
- Year: World Tour 2015

The Netsuite Open 2015 is the men's edition of the 2015 Netsuite Open, which is a tournament of the PSA World Tour event International (prize money: $100,000). The event took place at the Justin Herman Plaza in San Francisco in the United States from 25 to 29 of September. Ramy Ashour won his second Netsuite Open trophy, beating Nick Matthew in the final.

== Prize money and ranking points ==
For 2015, the prize purse was $100,000. The prize money and points breakdown is as follows:

Prize money Netsuite Open (2015)
Event	W	F	SF	QF	1R
Points (PSA)	1750	1150	700	430	250
Prize money	$17,575	$12,025	$7,860	$4,855	$2,775

== Seeds ==
1. (England) Nick Matthew (final)
2. (France) Grégory Gaultier (semifinals)
3. (Colombia) Miguel Ángel Rodríguez (semifinals)
4. (Egypt) Ramy Ashour (champion)
5. (Germany) Simon Rösner (quarterfinals)
6. (England) Peter Barker (first round)
7. (France) Mathieu Castagnet (first round)
8. (England) James Willstrop (quarterfinals)

== Draw and results ==
First round
1	(England) Nick Matthew *	11	12	6	11
(Egypt) Mazen Hesham	6	10	11	4
WC	(United States) Mike Lewis	7	2	3
5	(Germany) Simon Rösner	11	11	11
6	(England) Peter Barker	8	3	9
(Australia) Cameron Pilley	11	11	11
Q	(Mexico) César Salazar	9	11	7	13	2
3	(Colombia) Miguel Á. Rodríguez	11	8	11	11	11
4	(Egypt) Ramy Ashour *	11	11	11
Q	(England) Tom Richards	6	8	5
Q	(Australia) Ryan Cuskelly	11	9	11	10	11
7	(France) Mathieu Castagnet	5	11	5	12	7
8	(England) James Willstrop	11	7	11	12	11
(Switzerland) Nicolas Müller	5	11	9	14	9
Q	(Egypt) Ali Farag	6	11	10	11	10
2	(France) Grégory Gaultier *	11	8	11	8	12

Quarter finals
1	(England) Nick Matthew *	5	11	11	13	11
5	(Germany) Simon Rösner	11	7	13	11	7
(Australia) Cameron Pilley	11	3	11	12	8
3	(Colombia) Miguel Á. Rodríguez *	6	11	8	14	11
4	(Egypt) Ramy Ashour *	11	11	11	11
Q	(Australia) Ryan Cuskelly	4	5	13	4
8	(England) James Willstrop	4	11	9	3
2	(France) Grégory Gaultier *	11	8	11	11

Semi finals
1	(England) Nick Matthew *	11	9	11	11
3	(Colombia) Miguel Á. Rodríguez	2	11	6	5
4	(Egypt) Ramy Ashour *	11	5	10	11	11
2	(France) Grégory Gaultier	4	11	12	2	3

Final
1	(England) Nick Matthew	7	11	5	4
4	(Egypt) Ramy Ashour *	11	9	11	11

== See also ==
- 2015 PSA World Tour
- Netsuite Open
