= Men's Abierto Mexicano de Raquetas 2012 =

Abierto Mexicano de Raquetas 2012
- 1st PSA Abierto Mexicano

Details
- Event name: Abierto Mexicano de Raquetas 2012
- Location: Toluca Mexico
- Website www.abiertomexicanoderaquetas.com

Men's Winner
- Category: International 70
- Prize money: $70,000
- Year: World Tour 2012

The Men's Abierto Mexicano de Raquetas 2012 is the men's edition of the 2012 Abierto Mexicano de Raquetas, which is a tournament of the PSA World Tour event International (prize money: 70 000 $). The event took place in Toluca in Mexico from 1 to 4 November. Grégory Gaultier won his first Abierto Mexicano de Raquetas trophy, beating Omar Mosaad in the final.

== Prize money and ranking points ==
For 2012, the prize purse was $70,000. The prize money and points breakdown is as follows:

Prize money Abierto Mexicano de Raquetas (2012)
Event	W	F	SF	QF	1R
Points (PSA)	1225	805	490	300	175
Prize money	$11,875	$8,125	$5,315	$3,280	$1,875

== Seeds ==
1. (France) Grégory Gaultier (champion)
2. (Egypt) Karim Darwish (quarterfinals)
3. (Egypt) Amr Shabana (first round)
4. (England) Peter Barker (semifinals)

== Draw and results ==
First round
1	(France) Grégory Gaultier	11	11	6	11
Q	(India) Saurav Ghosal	1	8	11	9
(Netherlands) Laurens Jan Anjema	8	9	4
(Egypt) Mohd El Shorbagy	11	11	11
(Switzerland) Nicolas Müller	18	11	7	13	11
Q	(Finland) Olli Tuominen	16	5	11	15	3
Q	(Egypt) Marwan El Shorbagy	5	11	6	11	4
4	(England) Peter Barker	11	6	11	6	11
3	(Egypt) Amr Shabana	9	11	9	3
(Spain) Borja Golán	11	7	11	5
(Germany) Simon Rösner	11	11	11	8	11
Q	(England) Chris Simpson	13	6	8	11	7
(Egypt) Omar Mosaad	11	11	11
WC	(Mexico) Alfredo Ávila	9	7	6
(Botswana) Alister Walker	5	11	10
2	(Egypt) Karim Darwish	11	12	11

Quarter finals
1	(France) Grégory Gaultier	7	11	13	11
(Egypt) Mohd El Shorbagy	11	5	11	4
(Switzerland) Nicolas Müller	8	11	3	6
4	(England) Peter Barker	11	7	11	11
(Spain) Borja Golán	7	11	10	10
(Germany) Simon Rösner	11	5	12	12
(Egypt) Omar Mosaad	9	13	11	2	12
2	(Egypt) Karim Darwish	11	11	6	11	10

Semi finals
1	(France) Grégory Gaultier	11	11	11
4	(England) Peter Barker	1	4	1
(Germany) Simon Rösner	11	11	9	9	9
(Egypt) Omar Mosaad	9	7	11	11	11

Final
1	(France) Grégory Gaultier	11	11	11
(Egypt) Omar Mosaad	6	8	5

== See also ==
- PSA World Tour 2012
- Abierto Mexicano de Raquetas
