= 2012 Canary Wharf Squash Classic =

- 9th Canary Wharf Squash Classic

Details
- Event name: Canary Wharf Squash Classic 2012
- Location: London, England
- Venue: East Wintergarden
- Website www.cwsquash.com

Men's Winner
- Category: World Tour International 50
- Prize money: $50,000
- Year: World Tour 2012

The Canary Wharf Squash Classic 2012 is the 2012's Canary Wharf Squash Classic, which is a tournament of the PSA World Tour event International (Prize money : 50 000 $). The event took place at the East Wintergarden in London in England from 19 March to 23 March. Nick Matthew won his third Canary Wharf Squash Classic trophy, beating James Willstrop in the final.

== Prize money and ranking points ==
For 2012, the prize purse was $50,000. The prize money and points breakdown is as follows:

Prize Money Canary Wharf Squash Classic (2012)
Event	W	F	SF	QF	1R
Points (PSA)	875	575	350	215	125
Prize money	$8,075	$5,525	$3,615	$2,230	$1,275

== Seeds ==
1. (England) Nick Matthew (Champion)
2. (England) James Willstrop (Final)
3. (England) Peter Barker (Semifinals)
4. (Egypt) Mohamed El Shorbagy (Semifinals)

== Draw and results ==
First round
1	(England) Nick Matthew	11	10	11	11
(Egypt) Ali Anwar Reda	5	12	5	6
(England) Daryl Selby	11	11	11
Q	(England) Robbie Temple	6	7	8
(Germany) Simon Rösner	11	11	11
Q	(England) Adrian Waller	8	5	6
Q	(Hungary) Márk Krajcsák	2	5	3
3	(England) Peter Barker	11	11	11
4	(Egypt) Mohd El Shorbagy	11	11	11
(England) Joe Lee	7	4	5
(England) Adrian Grant	11	10	11	11
Q	(England) Chris Simpson	8	12	8	6
(Egypt) Tarek Momen	12	13	11
(Egypt) Marwan El Shorbagy	10	11	7
(India) Saurav Ghosal	7	11	4	12	5
2	(England) James Willstrop	11	7	11	10	11

Quarter finals
1	(England) Nick Matthew	11	11	11
(England) Daryl Selby	8	7	9
(Germany) Simon Rösner	7	6	5
3	(England) Peter Barker	11	11	12
4	(Egypt) Mohd El Shorbagy	11	11	11
(England) Adrian Grant	4	6	6
(Egypt) Tarek Momen	11	8	11	3	9
2	(England) James Willstrop	6	11	8	11	11

Semi finals
1	(England) Nick Matthew	8	11	11	9	11
3	(England) Peter Barker	11	7	5	11	3
4	(Egypt) Mohd El Shorbagy	6	11	5	5
2	(England) James Willstrop	11	8	11	11

Final
1	(England) Nick Matthew	11	11	11
2	(England) James Willstrop	7	8	9

== See also ==
- PSA World Tour 2012
- Canary Wharf Squash Classic
- 2012 Men's British Open
