= Swedish Squash Open 2016 =

Swedish Open 2016
- 13th Swedish Open

Details
- Event name: Case Swedish Open 2016
- Location: Linköping Sweden
- Venue: Linköpings Sporthall
- Website www.swedishopensquash.se

Men's Winner
- Category: World Tour International 70
- Prize money: $70,000
- Year: World Tour 2016

The UCS Swedish Open 2016 is the 2016 Swedish Open, which is a tournament of the PSA World Tour event International (prize money: $70,000). The event took place in Linköping in Sweden from 4 February to 7 February. Karim Abdel Gawad won his first Swedish Open trophy, beating Tarek Momen in the final.

== Prize money and ranking points ==
For 2016, the prize purse was $70,000. The prize money and points breakdown is as follows:

Prize Money Swedish Open (2016)
Event	W	F	SF	QF	1R
Points (PSA)	1225	805	490	300	175
Prize money	$11,875	$8,125	$5,315	$3,280	$1,875

== Seeds ==
1. (Germany) Simon Rösner (semifinals)
2. (Egypt) Karim Abdel Gawad (champion)
3. (Egypt) Tarek Momen (final)
4. (Hong Kong) Max Lee (quarterfinals)
5. (England) Daryl Selby (semifinals)
6. (Egypt) Fares Dessouky (first round)
7. (Australia) Cameron Pilley (quarterfinals)
8. (England) Chris Simpson (quarterfinals)

== Draw and results ==
First round
1	(Germany) Simon Rösner *	11	11	11
Q	(England) Ben Coleman	7	4	6
Q	(Netherlands) Laurens Jan Anjema	4	11	8	9
7	(Australia) Cameron Pilley *	11	3	11	11
6	(Egypt) Fares Dessouky	11	11	7	2
Q	(France) Lucas Serme *	8	13	11	11
(England) Adrian Waller	9	8	11	2
3	(Egypt) Tarek Momen *	11	11	8	11
4	(Hong Kong) Max Lee *	11	11	4	10	11
(Scotland) Alan Clyne	6	7	11	12	8
Q	(Finland) Olli Tuominen	5	9	7
5	(England) Daryl Selby *	11	11	11
8	(England) Chris Simpson *	11	11	11
(Scotland) Greg Lobban	7	7	5
WC	(Sweden) Rasmus Hult	5	8	8
2	(Egypt) Karim Abdel Gawad *	11	11	11

Quarter finals
1	(Germany) Simon Rösner *	9	11	12	11
7	(Australia) Cameron Pilley	11	7	10	6
Q	(France) Lucas Serme	9	6	3
3	(Egypt) Tarek Momen *	11	11	11
4	(Hong Kong) Max Lee	9	5	14
5	(England) Daryl Selby *	11	11	16
8	(England) Chris Simpson	11	6	6	11	7
2	(Egypt) Karim Abdel Gawad *	7	11	11	9	11

Semi finals
1	(Germany) Simon Rösner	11	12	6	11	9
3	(Egypt) Tarek Momen *	5	14	11	7	11
5	(England) Daryl Selby	9	4	8
2	(Egypt) Karim Abdel Gawad *	11	11	11

Final
3	(Egypt) Tarek Momen	10	11	9	11	4
2	(Egypt) Karim Abdel Gawad *	12	8	11	3	11

== See also ==
- 2015 PSA World Tour
- Swedish Open (squash)
