= Silicon Valley Open =

Squash tournament

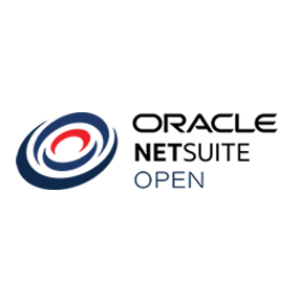

Details
- Event name: Netsuite Open (2011–2022); Silicon Valley Open (2024–
- Location: Redwood City, United States
- Venue: Squash Zone
- Website; Official website

Men's Winner
- Category: World Tour Gold
- Prize money: $122,000

Women's Winner
- Category: World Tour Gold
- Prize money: $122,000

The Silicon Valley Open sponsored by Oracle NetSuite is an annual squash tournament that takes place in Redwood City in October. In 2024 the competition changed its name from the NetSuite Open to the Silicon Valle Open.

The event was not held in 2020, when it was cancelled amid the COVID-19 pandemic. Also in 2023 the event was not held.

== Past winners ==
=== Men ===
Year	Winner	Runner-up	score	Notes/Ref
2011	(Netherlands) Laurens Jan Anjema	(Egypt) Omar Mosaad	7-11, 7-11, 11-8, 11-5, 14-12	
2012	(France) Grégory Gaultier	(England) Nick Matthew	11-7, 13-11, 11-9	
2013	(Egypt) Ramy Ashour	(France) Grégory Gaultier	11-4, 7-11, 7-11, 11-3, 11-3	
2014	(France) Grégory Gaultier	(Egypt) Amr Shabana	11-3, 11-5, 11-5	
2015	(Egypt) Ramy Ashour	(England) Nick Matthew	11-7, 9-11, 11-5, 11-4	
2016	(France) Grégory Gaultier	(England) James Willstrop	11-9, 11-2, 14-12	
2017	(Egypt) Mohamed El Shorbagy	(Egypt) Karim Abdel Gawad	11-9, 11-6, 11-3	
2018	(Egypt) Ali Farag	(Egypt) Mohamed El Shorbagy	11–9, 13–11, 4–11, 11–9	
2019	(Egypt) Mohamed El Shorbagy	(Egypt) Tarek Momen	11–5, 11–13, 11–9, 7–11, 11–4	
2020	Cancelled due to COVID-19 pandemic in the United States			
2021	(Egypt) Ali Farag	(New Zealand) Paul Coll	9–11, 12–10, 11–8, 11–8	
2022	(England) Mohamed El Shorbagy	(Egypt) Marwan El Shorbagy	6–11, 11–9, 11–2, 11–8	
2023	not held			
2024	(Wales) Joel Makin	(Egypt) Youssef Soliman	12-10, 12-10, 8-11, 11–3	
2025	(Egypt) Karim Gawad	(France) Victor Crouin	11–3, 2–11, 11–5, 12–10	

=== Women ===
Year	Winner	Runner-up	score	Notes/Ref
2015	(United States) Amanda Sobhy	(England) Sarah-Jane Perry	11-5, 4-11, 11-5, 12-10	
2016	(England) Laura Massaro	(United States) Amanda Sobhy	11-4, 9-11, 11-8, 11-7	
2017	(England) Sarah-Jane Perry	(Malaysia) Nicol David	8-11, 8-11, 11-7, 14-12, 11-7	
2018	(England) Sarah-Jane Perry	(Egypt) Raneem El Weleily	11–9, 11–7, 9–11, 7–11, 11–7	
2019	(Egypt) Raneem El Weleily	(Egypt) Nour El Tayeb	11–5, 11–5, 11–5	
2020	Cancelled due to COVID-19 pandemic in the United States			
2021	(United States) Amanda Sobhy	(Egypt) Salma Hany	11–7, 11–8, 11–4	
2022	(United States) Amanda Sobhy	(Egypt) Farida Mohamed	9–11, 11–5, 11–3, 11–7	
2023	not held			
2024	(United States) Olivia Weaver	(Japan) Satomi Watanabe	11-4, 11–2, 11–8	
2025	(United States) Olivia Weaver	(Malaysia) Sivasangari Subramaniam	12–10, 4–11, 11–4, 11–4	
