= Bluenose Classic =

Bluenose Squash Classic

Details
- Event name: Bluenose Squash Classic
- Location: Halifax, Canada
- Website squashns.ca

Men's Winner
- Category: International 35
- Prize money: $35,000
- Most recent champion(s): (Australia) Ryan Cuskelly

The Bluenose Squash Classic was an annual squash tournament that took place in Halifax, Canada.

The event was part of the PSA World Tour. It was established in 2006, and was last held in 2015.

== Past Results ==
Year	Champion	Runner-up	Score in final
2015	(Australia) Ryan Cuskelly	(Egypt) Karim Abdel Gawad	16–14, 11–8, 11–6
2014	(England) Peter Barker	(Colombia) Miguel Ángel Rodríguez	11–6, 11–7, 11–8
2013	(Colombia) Miguel Ángel Rodríguez	(England) Daryl Selby	4–11, 11–2, 11–2, 11–6
2012	(France) Thierry Lincou	(England) Daryl Selby	9–11, 11–8, 9–11, 11–5, 11–4
2011	(Malaysia) Mohd Azlan Iskandar	(Egypt) Hisham Mohd Ashour	11–8, 8–11, 11–9, 11–7
2010	(France) Thierry Lincou	(England) Daryl Selby	11–2, 10–12, 11–8, 12–10
2009	(Australia) David Palmer	(England) Peter Barker	11–5, 11–5, 11–7
2008	(Netherlands) Laurens Jan Anjema	(Spain) Borja Golán	8–11, 12–10, 11–5, 4–11, 13–11
2007	(Canada) Shahier Razik	(Spain) Borja Golán	5–11, 11–9, 8–11, 11–5, 11–6
2006	(Canada) Shawn Delierre	(Colombia) Bernardo Samper	12–10, 13–11, 3–11, 15–13

== See also ==
- PSA World Tour
