= Swedish Open (squash) =

Details
- Event name: Case Swedish Open
- Location: Linköping, Sweden
- Venue: Linkoping Sporthalle
- Website www.swedishopensquash.se

Men's PSA World Tour
- Category: World Tour International 70
- Prize money: $70,000
- Most recent champion(s): (France) Grégory Gaultier
- Current: Swedish Squash Open 2016

The Swedish Open is a squash tournament held in Linköping, Sweden in February. It is part of the PSA World Tour. The event has been played since the middle of the seventies.

== Past results ==
Year	Champion	Runner-up	Score in final
2017	(France) Grégory Gaultier	(Egypt) Karim Abdel Gawad	7-11, 11-3, 11-0, 11-8
2016	(Egypt) Karim Abdel Gawad	(Egypt) Tarek Momen	12-10, 8-11, 11-9, 3-11, 11-4
2015	(England) Nick Matthew	(France) Grégory Gaultier	11-9, 11-8, 11-7
2014	(England) Nick Matthew	(Egypt) Ramy Ashour	11-13, 11-6, 11-8, 6-11, 11-4
2013	(France) Grégory Gaultier	(England) Nick Matthew	11-3, 12-10, 11-9
2012	(France) Grégory Gaultier	(Egypt) Karim Darwish	11-3, 11-6, 11-8
2011	(England) Nick Matthew	(England) Peter Barker	11-7, 11-6, 11-5
2010	(England) Nick Matthew	(England) James Willstrop	11-9, 11-6, 6-2 rtd
2009	(England) Nick Matthew	(Egypt) Karim Darwish	rtd
2008	(England) James Willstrop	(England) Peter Barker	11-7, 11-4, 11-4
2007	(Australia) David Palmer	(Wales) Alex Gough	12-10, 11-4, 11-7
2006	No competition		
2005	No competition		
2004	(Egypt) Karim Darwish	(England) Nick Matthew	15-12, 15-13, 15-10
2003	(Australia) Stewart Boswell	(Scotland) John White	6-15, 15-7, 15-6, 15-12
2002	(Malaysia) Ong Beng Hee	(Finland) Olli Tuominen	15-10, 11-15, 15-12, 12-15, 15-8
