= National Squash Centre =

Squash venue in Manchester, England

Coordinates: 53.4846°N 2.2027°W

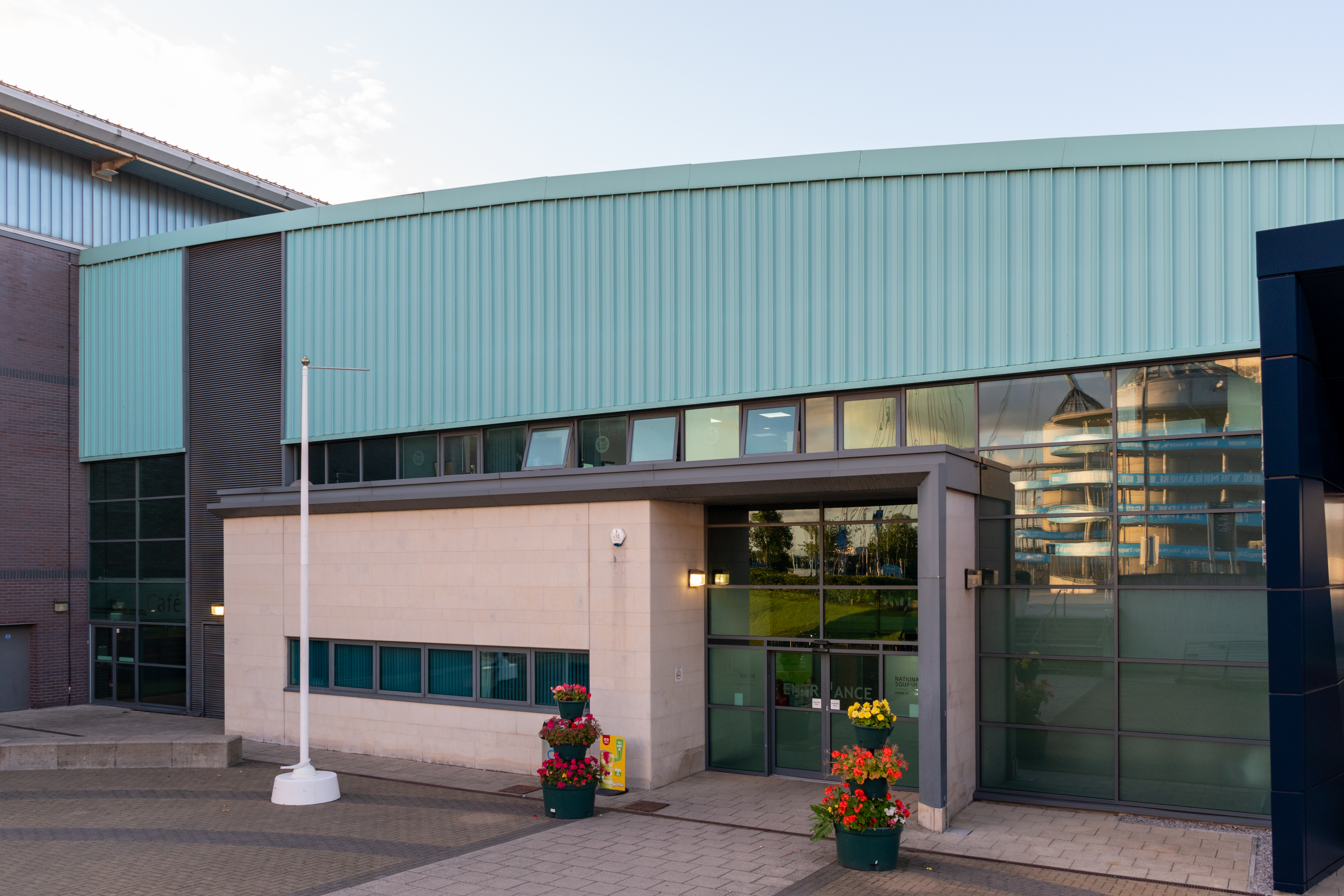
Entrance to the National Squash Centre

The National Squash Centre is a squash venue in Eastlands, Manchester, England, which was constructed for the 2002 Commonwealth Games. The National Squash Centre is part of the Sportcity complex and is joined to the Manchester Regional Arena.

Costing approximately £3.5m, the facilities include six courts and one glass-walled show court (this alone cost £110,000). The show court is moveable: it floats on air like a hovercraft and can be positioned in the athletics hall for all major tournaments. The show court has a maximum capacity of 1,200.

All of the courts can be converted into either singles or doubles courts.

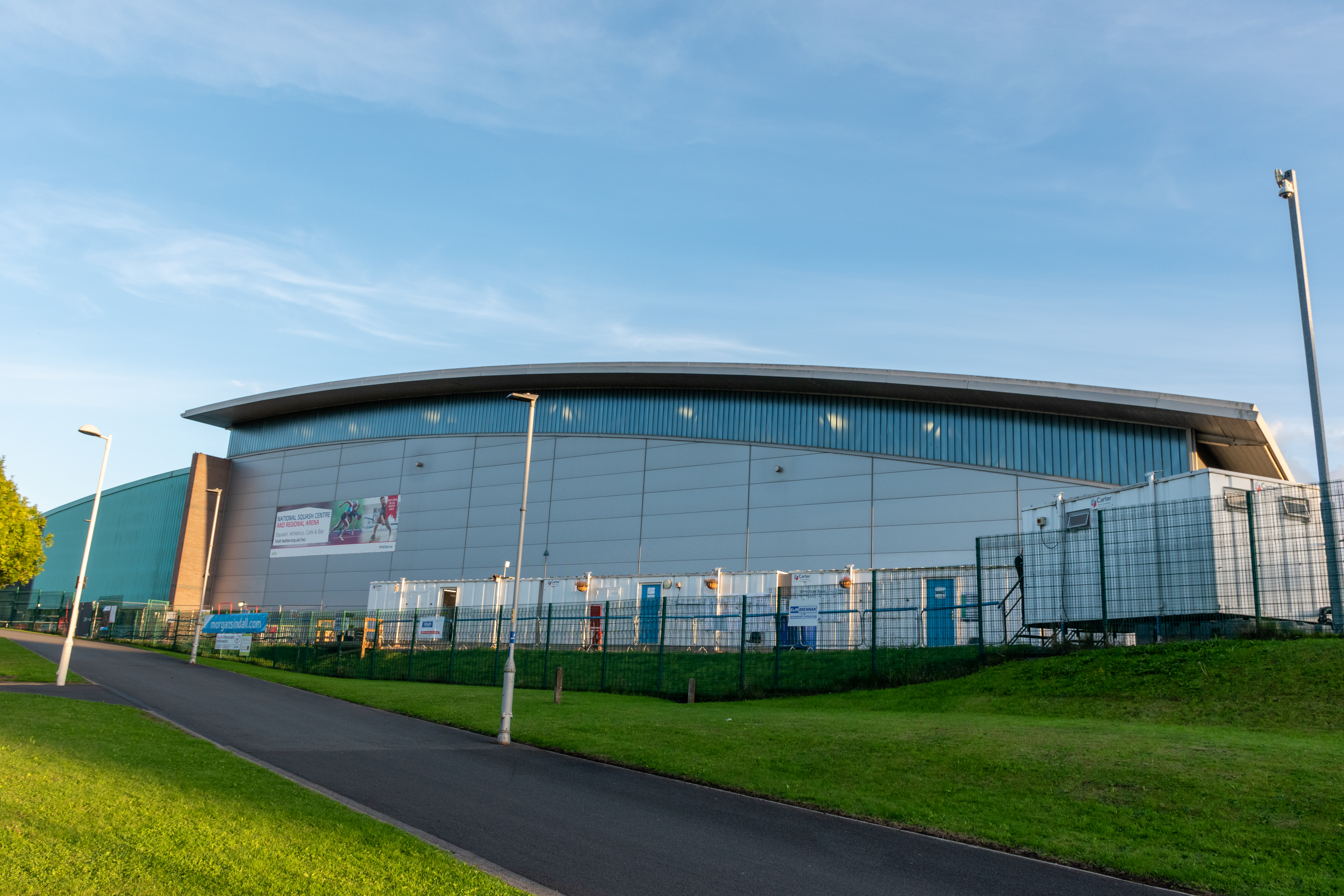
The centre in 2022

The centre has hosted the British National Squash Championships 17 times since 2003, the Men's World Open 2008, the Women's World Open 2008 and hosts the annual British Grand Prix, a PSA World Series event.

A refurbishment of the centre is due to be completed in early 2027.

== See also ==
- England Squash
