= Oliver Pett =

English squash player (born 1988)

Personal information
- Born: 19 October 1988 (age 37) Margate, England
- Height: 1.78 m (5 ft 10 in)
- Weight: 75 kg (165 lb)

Sport
- Country: England
- Turned pro: 2008
- Coached by: Tim Vail
- Retired: 2016
- Racquet used: ProKennex

Men's singles
- Highest ranking: No. 48 (October, 2012)
- Title: 3
- Tour final: 5

Oliver Pett (born 19 October 1988 in Margate) is a former professional squash player who represents England. He reached a career-high world ranking of World No. 48 in October 2012.
