= British Grand Prix (squash) =

Details
- Event name: British Grand Prix
- Location: Manchester, England
- Venue: National Squash Centre
- Website www.britishsquashgrandprix.com

Men's Winner
- Category: International 70
- Prize money: $70,000
- Most recent champion(s): (England) Nick Matthew
- Current: British Grand Prix (squash) 2015

The British Grand Prix is an annual men's squash tournament that takes place at the National Squash Centre in Manchester.

The tournament was part of the PSA World Series (2010-2011), the most prestigious class of event in the PSA World Tour. The tournament was founded in 2010 and takes place in September. The first two editions of the tournament were won by Egyptian Ramy Ashour. It was a partial replacement of the British Open Squash Championships, which were suspended in 2010 and restarted in 2012.

== Past Results ==
Year	Champion	Runner-up	Score in final
2016	(England) Nick Matthew	(England) James Willstrop	11-7, 12-10, 11-4
2015	(Egypt) Mohamed El Shorbagy	(England) Nick Matthew	11-7, 12-10, 9-11, 11-6
2014	(England) Nick Matthew	(France) Mathieu Castagnet	11-7, 11-6, 11-5
2013	not held due to the 2013 World Championship		
2012	(England) Nick Matthew	(England) James Willstrop	4-11, 11-6, 11-9, 11-5
2011	(Egypt) Ramy Ashour	(England) Nick Matthew	1-11, 11-3, 11-7, 11-4
2010	(Egypt) Ramy Ashour	(England) James Willstrop	11-7, 3-11, 11-3, 11-5
