= Sport in Birmingham =

Sport has always been important in Birmingham, England, from the hundreds of diverse grass-roots sports clubs to internationally famous teams, associations and venues.

The city was the first city to have been awarded the title National City of Sport by the Sports Council.

== Major teams ==
Major sports teams in Birmingham
Club	Sport	Founded	League	Venue
Aston Villa	Football	1874	Premier League	Villa Park
Birmingham City	Football	1875	EFL Championship	St. Andrew's Stadium
Birmingham Moseley Rugby	Rugby union	1873	National League 1	Billesley Common
Warwickshire County Cricket Club	Cricket	1882	County Championship	Edgbaston Cricket Ground

== Athletics ==
The Birmingham Athletic Club opened a Gymnasium in King Alfred's Place, in Aug 1865/6, and held their annual display and assault-at-arms in the Town Hall. The first festival of the Birmingham Athletic Club was held in 1868. On 1 March 1880 an association was organised of many of the bicycle clubs, cricket clubs, football clubs, and similar athletic bodies in the town and neighbourhood, under the name of "The Midland Counties Amateurs' Athletic Union." The sport was so popular that in January 1879 the "Midland Athlete" newspaper was first published. In 1889 the BAC formed the Birmingham Athletic Institute to promote public physical education along the lines of the Birmingham and Midland Institute for education.

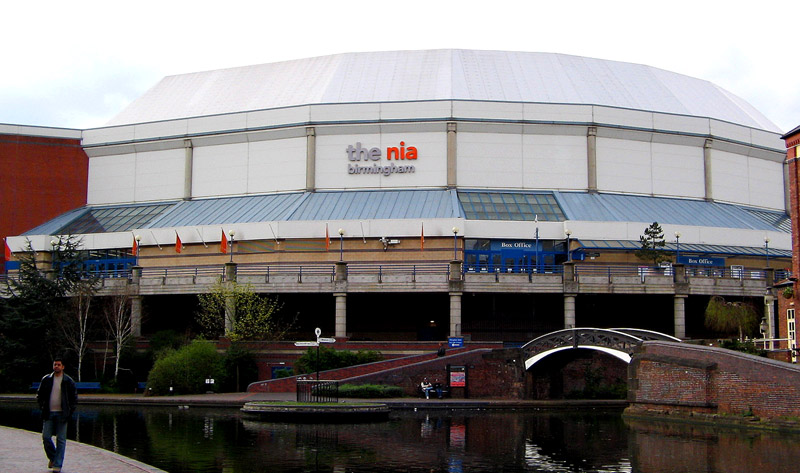
The NIA

In 1940 a German bomb destroyed the clubroom, gymnasium, equipment and 74 years of records. This initiated the slow decline of the BAC which eventually disbanded in November 1956. All that survived were their five most prized trophies, protected by a tin box in the basement.

Today track and field athletics takes place at the open-air Alexander Stadium on a national and international level. Recent development has seen addition of a High Performance Centre for indoor intense specialist training. The Stadium is also home to Birchfield Harriers, who have contributed towards Britain's National and International Athletics for many years and has produced international athletes such as Denise Lewis, Mark Lewis-Francis and Kelly Sotherton. The National Indoor Arena is Britain's Premier Indoor Athletics stadium and in 2003 hosted the 9th IAAF World Indoor Championships in Athletics. The city hosted the European Athletic Association's 2007 European Athletics Indoor Championships.

== Cricket ==
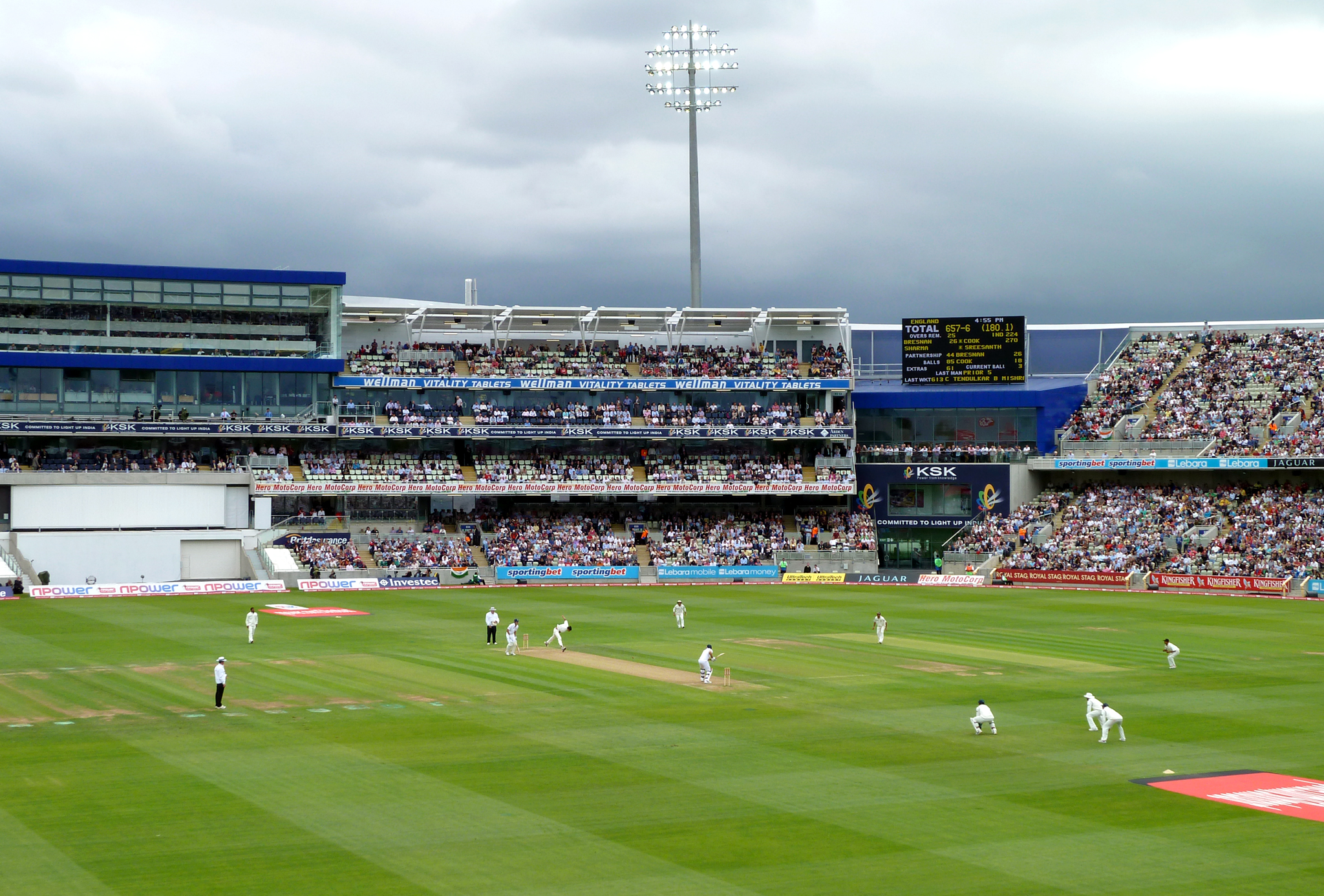
Edgbaston Cricket Ground, home of Warwickshire County Cricket Club

Records from the 19th century suggest that there was a cricket club in existence in Birmingham by 1745, and that a cricket match was being played in Birmingham on the day that the Battle of Culloden was fought in 1746. The earliest cricket match in Birmingham for which a definite record exists took place on Monday 15 July 1751, between "Eleven of the Gentlemen of the Holte Bridgman's Club and Eleven of the Gentlemen of Mr Thomas Bellamy's Club, the most of three innings, for Twenty-Two Guineas", at the cricket ground at Holte Bridgman's Apollo Gardens in Deritend, Aston. Admission was 2 pence. In 1760 a "Society of Cricket Players of Birmingham" advertised in Aris's Birmingham Gazette to challenge any other team within 30 miles of the town to a game for the prize of 20 guineas.

The Birmingham and District Cricket League is the oldest cricket league in the world, having been founded in 1888.

Cricket was extremely popular in Birmingham between World War I and World War II. Records from the Sports Argus show that there were 200 teams playing cricket weekly within Birmingham in 1922, a figure which rose to 300 in 1930 and exceeded 320 in 1939. These figures do not include teams playing in competitions within individual firms – in the early 1930s the Birmingham Small Arms Company alone supported a cricket league of 14 teams.

Today County Cricket is played at the Edgbaston Cricket Ground, home to Warwickshire County Cricket Club. International test matches are also held there.

In 1882, Bournville Cricket Club was founded in Froggarts Farm on the corner of Bournville Lane and Linden Road, which is now The Old Farm Hotel. The Ground held its first county game when Worcestershire played Essex in June 1910, and in 1982 held an ICC champions trophy 3rd Place Play off when Papua New Guinea played Bangladesh.

Birmingham was the host for the first ever Cricket World Cup of either gender, a Women's Cricket World Cup in 1973. England beat Australia in the finals.

== Football ==
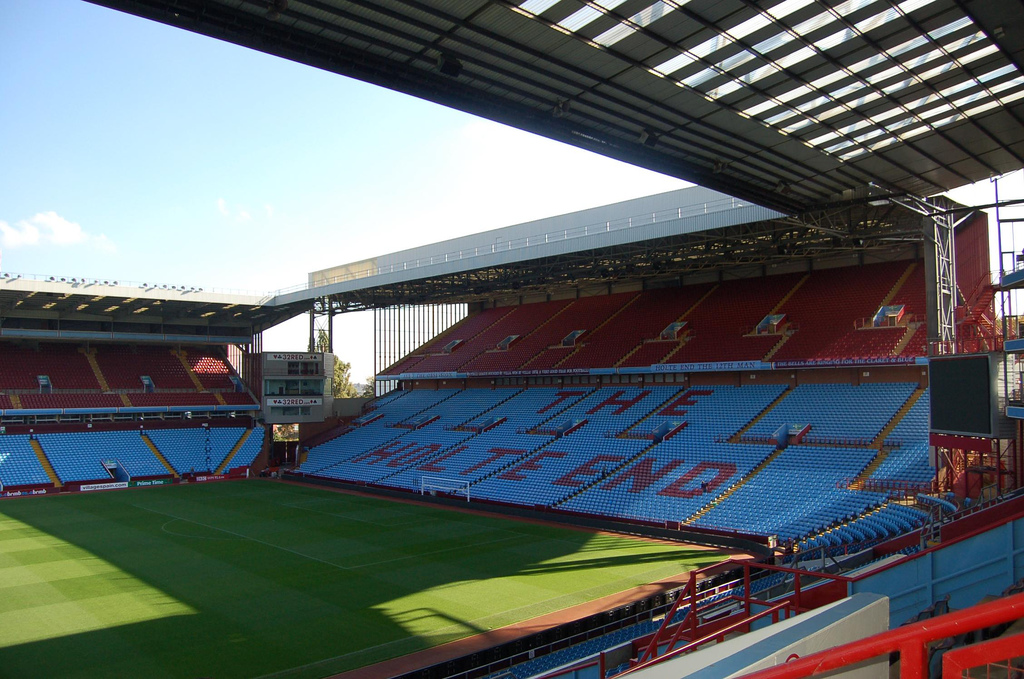
Villa Park, home of Aston Villa of the Premier League

The city is home to two of the oldest professional football teams in the world: Aston Villa (1874) and Birmingham City (1875). Nearby West Bromwich Albion's ground The Hawthorns used to be divided by the Birmingham/Smethwick border, but was moved completely into the latter by a minor rationalisation of local government borders in the 1960s and is now in Sandwell. In addition, Birmingham features several non-league teams including Romulus and Sutton Coldfield Town and professional team Coventry City played at St Andrew's for two seasons between 2019 and 2021.

Aston in Birmingham is notable for being the location for the first football league, which was invented by William McGregor on 22 March 1885. Aston Villa Football Club were among the founding clubs of the Premier League in 1992. Villa is also one of only three football clubs to be a founding member of both the Premier League in 1992 and the English Football League in 1888.

Birmingham City Ladies compete at the top level of English women's football, the FA WSL.

== Rugby Union ==
Rugby Union is played in Birmingham by Moseley Rugby Football Club promoted as Champions to the second tier in April 2006, since re-branded as the RFU Championship. The club was founded in 1873 and reached four cup finals, sharing the trophy with Gloucester on one occasion before an outright win at Twickenham in 2009. Playing for most of their history at The Reddings, in 2000 Moseley relocated to a temporary ground at the University of Birmingham and now have a new permanent home at Billesley Common.

The Solihull-based Birmingham & Solihull Pertemps Bees was established in 1989.

== Other team sports ==
=== Speedway ===
The first ever speedway meeting in Birmingham was held on 12 July 1928 at The Alexander Sports Stadium (now the Perry Barr Greyhound Stadium). The last speedway meeting of that season was held on 1 September 1928. The first meeting after World War II was held on 4 May 1946 against Norwich. It was used up until 1957 and again in 1960. The Birchfield Harriers then refused for the stadium to be used for speedway again.

The team then moved to the former Perry Barr Greyhound Stadium which was renamed the Ladbroke Stadium. It staged speedway from 1929 to 1931, and then from 1971 to 1983. It was demolished the following year. The team broke up in 1986 after their final meeting at Bordesley Green.

In March 2007, Speedway racing returned to Birmingham after 20 years. A new team was created to compete at the Perry Barr Greyhound Stadium under the name the "Birmingham Brummies".

The Brummies have won several honours since reforming in 2007. These include winning the Midland Shield in 2007, the Premier League pairs in 2009, the Premier League fours in 2010, the National League fours in 2015, the National Trophy in 2016. They also won back to back National League titles in 2015 and 2016.

Following the closure of Perry Barr Stadium in August 2025, the team dissolved.

=== American football ===
The city is home to two amateur American football teams. One, the Birmingham Bulls, founded in 1983, is amongst the oldest teams playing the sport in the United Kingdom, and play in the BAFANL Division One SFC North. The team play their home games at Erin Go Bragh in Erdington.

The other is the Birmingham Lions, the American football team representing the University of Birmingham in the BUAFL. Founded in 1989, they are one of the most successful teams in their league; winning multiple national championships in recent year.

=== Baseball ===
Birmingham is home to Birmingham Baseball Club, which fields two teams, the Metalheads and the Bats, in the West Midlands Baseball League, playing their home games at Marston Green Recreation Ground.

Based in Marston Green, the club claim a number of BBF division championships. In 2024, the Metalheads won the BBF AA Summer Cup and the West Midlands Baseball League Championship.

=== Basketball ===
Basketball was first introduced to Birmingham in 1911 when a YMCA instructor brought basketball to Birmingham YMCA, and a team was produced. The American Rules had been introduced, but the teams in Birmingham found them to be too complicated, and when forming a Local Basketball Association, they compiled a more practical set of rules for their own use. The first basketball tournament for the Senior Championship Cup was held in Birmingham on 6 June 1936. On 9 April 1938 the first Junior Championship Final was held in Birmingham.

For England's first international basketball competition, Birmingham provided three players; F. Cole, C. Hunt and A. J. Lee. A Championship Final was held in April 1940 with the Birmingham Athletic Institute (BAI) beating London Central YMCA in the match. Due to World War II, there was no championship for the next six years, resulting in Birmingham retaining the trophy for that period.

More recently, basketball was played by the Birmingham Bullets, who competed in the top United Kingdom basketball league. The Bullets went on a season-long break from competitive action in 2006, however, and subsequently went into liquidation and ceased to exist. The Birmingham Bullets were later replaced by the Birmingham Panthers for the 2007-08 season; however a lack of success led them to fold after a single season. A third basketball team, Birmingham Knights, was founded in 2011 and joined the league in 2013; playing their home games at North Solihull Sports Centre. However, as had happened with the Birmingham Panthers before them, Birmingham Knights folded after a single season; in which they had lost every single game.

=== Hockey ===
Hockey is a very popular sport with Edgbaston, Harborne and Bournville being the leading clubs in the city.

Edgbaston Hockey Club were founded in 1885, making them the second oldest hockey club in the country. Matches are played at the University of Birmingham and at Edgbaston High School. Bournville Hockey Club were founded in 1902 as a section of the Bournville Athletic Club. Their first game was against Small Heath on 15 November 1902, in which they lost. Bournville has produced international hockey players including David Griffith-Jones, who was selected to play for Wales in 1955 becoming Bournville's first international player. Bournville have moved venues in their history as a result of Cadbury's closure of the sports facilities at the factory. They are currently based at the University of Birmingham and King Edward VI High School for Girls.

=== Netball ===
Dozens of junior and senior Netball clubs exist in Birmingham such as the Birmingham City Netball Club (founded in 1995) and Sutton Town Netball Club (founded in 2006) (http://Suttontown.hitssports.com) which coordinates junior and intermediate netball teams (under-18s).

The Birmingham (adult) Netball League plays from September to March (approximately) and has roughly 100 teams which are arranged in 13 divisions. The 1st division includes some of England's top clubs like for instance Linden who are based at Nechells Community Centre and are currently the National Clubs League Division 1 leaders. There are several other Netball leagues in the UK of which Birmingham teams contribute considerably.

A "Netball Little League" was established in 2003 for the areas of Bournville and Selly Oak.

=== Rugby League ===
The city hosts a semiprofessional Rugby league club, the Midlands Hurricanes as well as an amateur club, the Birmingham Bulldogs, who compete in the Co-operative RLC Midlands Premier League (RLC)

=== Softball ===
Softball is a rapidly growing sport in Birmingham, having recently flourished since the founding of the Birmingham Bobcats in 2010. The Birmingham Softball League, an affiliate of the British Softball Federation, runs a summer season with league games played at the Birmingham City University Pavilion, while the Bobcats remain an independent national touring squad. Additionally, BCU routinely hosts the British Single-Sex National Championship tournament.

=== Volleyball ===
Volleyball takes place on a small scale across various venues in the city, several amateur teams exist such as "Selly Baskets Volleyball Team", "Persian Phoenix Volleyball Club"and "University of Birmingham Volleyball Club" who are currently in first division of the national league for men and the Super 8 level for women.

=== Water polo ===
There are many ground root Water Polo teams in existence across the Greater Birmingham area such as Warley Wasps who were established in 1888, the team runs both male and female water polo teams. Also "Sutton Coldfield Water Polo Club" and "Solihull Water Polo Club" offers water polo training for children and Adults with qualified Water Polo coaches.

The City of Birmingham Swimming Club draws from the local water polo clubs and competes at a national level.

=== Lacrosse ===
Lacrosse, a popular Canadian game, was introduced to Birmingham on 23 June 1883 by a team of Canadian Amateurs and Iroquois Indians, who exhibited their prowess at the Lower Grounds. The game never quite took off in the city, however the University of Birmingham, Birmingham Lacrosse Club and Aston University have lacrosse teams.

== Racket sports ==
=== Badminton ===
The National Indoor Arena has hosted international badminton events such as the World Indoor Badminton Championships. The All England Open Badminton Championships are now held at the NIA as a result of the tournament outgrowing all previous venues.

=== Tennis ===
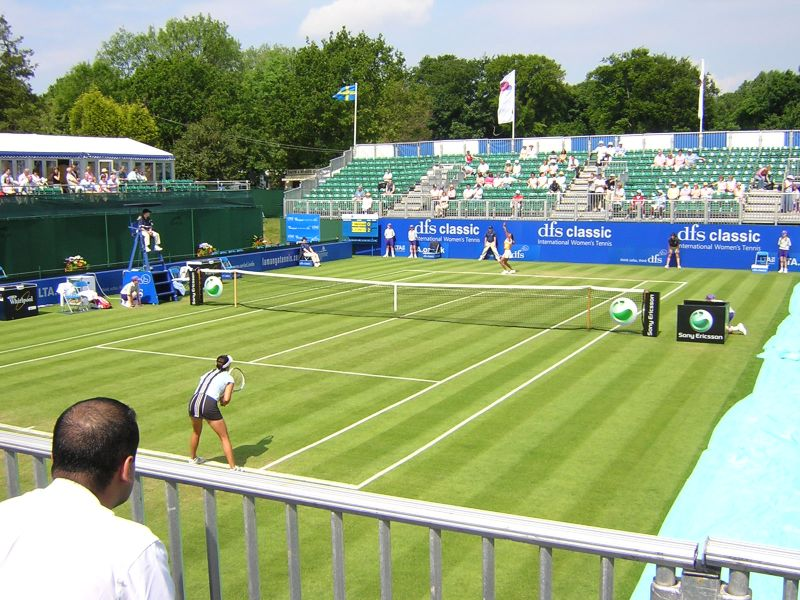
Aegon Classic international tennis tournament at the Edgbaston Priory Club

The first ever game of lawn tennis was played in Edgbaston in 1859 by Major Harry Gem and Augurio Perera, both residents of the city.

Tennis is not nowadays regularly associated with inner city urban areas, however several schemes nationwide are working to rectify this under achievement including "Tennis For Free". Many local tennis clubs and teams still exist in Greater Birmingham such as the 'Birmingham City Tennis Club' and international tennis is still played at Edgbaston's Priory Club.

== Other individual sports ==
=== Boxing ===
Boxing is popular in the city with many clubs and famous professional boxers such as Patrick Cowdell and Robert McKracken who have continued to support boxing in the UK by turning their skills to coaching new up- and- coming boxers. There are many professional boxers from Birmingham including Robert McKraken, Frankie Gavin and Matthew Macklin.

Famous Birmingham/Shropshire boxer Richie Woodhall works and trains with Birmingham Boxing Academy (BBA) and the city's premier boxing team Team Ringside . The BBA is a charitable organisation that works alongside lesser privileged children of central Birmingham. Richie also commentates for ITV, BBC and Sky.

Prize-fighting was long the popular sport of high and low life blackguards, and Birmingham added many a redoubtable name to the long list of famous prize-fighters, whose deeds are recorded in "Fistiana" and other chronicles of the ring. The earliest account of a local prize-fight is of that which took place in October 1782, for 100 guineas a side, between Jemmy Sargent, a professional, and Isaac Perrins, one of the Soho workmen. Jemmy knuckled under after being knocked down thirteen times, in as many rounds, by the knock-kneed hammer man from Soho, whose friends, it is said, won £1,500 in bets through his prowess. Bob Brettle was active in the 1850s.

During the late 18th century William Futrell (a well known Birmingham pugilist) becomes publisher of the first boxing paper.

There are twelve boxing clubs in Birmingham.

=== Mixed Martial Arts ===
Mixed Martial Arts is a popular sport in the city with many clubs such as Team Renegade which is home to the current UFC Welterweight Champion Leon Edwards who is from Aston, Birmingham.

=== Golf ===
Golf is a popular sport in the city with many clubs. Boldmere, Cocks Moors Woods, Harborne Church Farm, Hatchford Brook, Hilltop, Lickey Hills and Pype Hayes are all large high quality golf courses within Birmingham city.

Professional Golf is played at the Belfry (4 km outside Birmingham) which sometimes hosts The Ryder Cup.

=== Swimming ===
Birmingham's first swimming club formed in 1862 under the title of the "Birmingham Amateur Swimming Club". The "Birmingham Leander Swimming Club", based at Northwood Street Baths, commenced their aquatic activities in June 1877. The two clubs merged to form the "Birmingham and Leander Swimming Club" and moved to Woodcock Street Baths, now part of Aston University.

The celebrated swimmer, Captain Webb, visited Birmingham several times, and the Athletic Club presented him with a gold medal and purse on 4 December 1875. In 1949, the Birmingham Association of Swimming Clubs partnered with Warwickshire Amateur Swimming Association to win a bid to stage the "International Speed Swimming Contest for the Bologna Trophy", which was staged at Woodcock Street Baths. The Birmingham Baths Committee organised a visit as part of a tour by the "Het Y" Swimming Club of Amsterdam in 1950.

More recently The University of Birmingham has trained a number of competitive British swimmers. The team has won bronze medal consecutively in the BUSA team championships 2003-04 and 2004–05.

The "City of Birmingham Swimming Club" also trains swimmers of all ages and competes professionally at local and national level as does "Perry Beeches Sutton Swimming Squad", "Boldmere Swimming Club", "Orion Swimming Club" (located at King Edward VI High School for Girls) and "Solihull Swimming Club" (located at Tudor Grange Sports Centre, Solihull).

School swimming was introduced in the city in April 1875 following a campaign by Joseph Chamberlain, which commenced at a Meeting of the council on 10 November 1874. Following co-operation between the City of Birmingham Baths Department and the Birmingham School Board, schools were able to buy books of tickets to allow pupils to swim under the guidance of teachers at pools.

== Other sports and pastimes ==
=== Bowling ===
Bowling has long been a popular tradition in Birmingham with bowling greens and quoit grounds often attached to public houses.

In 1778 there was one at the Salutation inn, at the bottom of Snow Hill; in 1741 there was also one at the Hen and Chickens in the High Street. A new green was opened at the Union Tavern on Cherry Street on 26 March 1792. There was also a green at Aston Hall and Cannon Hill Park during the Victorian era.

In 1825 a bowling green was laid out at the corner of Highfield Road and Harborne Road, for "a very select party" of Edgbastonians. Bowls is still played in the city today with the existence of The Northfield & District Bowling Association and The Yardley Wood & District Mid-Week Bowling Association.

=== Greyhound racing ===
Greyhound racing was a popular event in the city until August 2025 when the final stadium in the city closed. Notable former stadiums include Perry Barr Stadium (1929-2025), Hall Green Stadium (1927-2017), Kings Heath Stadium (1927-1971), and Birchfield Ladbroke Stadium (1928-1984).

=== Ice skating ===
Ice Skating Rinks were opened at the Lower Grounds 1 May 1875; at Bingley Hall, 2 October 1875; at Moseley, 6 December 1876; and at Handsworth, 8 October 1877; and, for a time, the amusement was exceedingly popular, more than one fortune accruing from the manufacture of patent and other roller skates. One of the most noteworthy feats on the slippery rinks was the skating of 200 miles in 24 hours by a Mr. F. Betteridge at Bingley Hall, 20 August 1878.

Birmingham's last ice rink closed in 2003 and a project began campaigning for a new rink.

In the winter of 2005 one of the largest temporary outdoor ice skate rinks in Britain was erected on Centenary Square. Another rink was constructed in the square in the following year.

=== Ludosport (International Light Saber Combat Academy) ===
Ludosport, is an International Lightsaber Combat Academy, teaching light saber combat (inspired by the iconic weapon from the Star Wars movies) as an international competitive sport.

Classes started in Birmingham in January 2016 and pupils train on a weekly basis, with local instructors who have trained with the parent organisation in Italy "Ludosport International".

They regularly hold introductory "Discovery" Sessions where people can come along to try the sport.

The local classes are part of the UK network of Ludosport UK.

During the COVID-19 lockdown, all classes and competitions were suspended, but lessons re-started in September 2021 now run by the local franchise

=== Motor racing ===
The city is home to Birmingham Wheels motor sport park which features a short-track oval circuit based and MSA Kart Circuit. The oval circuit stages a number of high-profile stock car and banger race meetings, along with a charity race event every winter for Children in Need. The Grand Prix Karting circuit, where Nigel Mansell famously began his motor sport career remains one of the most testing circuits in the UK.

The city also staged the Birmingham Superprix on a number of occasions during the 1980s, a Formula 3000 event which took place on a street circuit in the city centre. Many of the competitors later went on to compete in Formula One, including former Ferrari driver Jean Alesi. Nigel Mansell also lived in Birmingham as a child and into his early adult years.

=== Roller derby ===
Birmingham has two female amateur roller derby leagues the Birmingham Blitz Derby Dames, formed in October 2006 by Bee Bentley who introduced the sport of roller derby to the West Midlands from America. Following this formation, the Central City Rollergirls formed from a split in November 2007.

Roller derby is an quad skating sport where blockers try to stop jammers from scoring points by lapping the blockers. The contact sport had Birmingham's first public bout in October 2007.

=== Skateboarding ===
Skateboarding is popular in the city. Many small skate parks exist as well as the Epic Skate Park based in Moseley, the park opened in 2003 within a former bus and tram garage. The park is one of the largest of its kind in Europe and now hosts international skate competitions as well as music videos and film.

The skate board wheel was pioneered in Birmingham during the 19th century.

=== Miscellany ===
Croquet was introduced in 1867; the first code of laws being published in October 1869. There is a croquet club at Edgbaston, which has been in existence since 1900. The club now play at Richmond Hill Road.

A horse racing course was located at Bromford Bridge in Bromford, Erdington during the late 19th and early 20th centuries. A smaller course was located on the former site of Four Oaks Hall in Sutton Coldfield, however its existence was short and it was removed before Sutton Coldfield became part of Birmingham in 1974.

The 1972 World Snooker Championship was held in Selly Oak. It was won by Alex Higgins.

== 2022 Commonwealth Games ==
Birmingham will host the 2022 Commonwealth Games. The city bid to host the event after Durban withdrew as the host city. Birmingham's bid was the only bid that was submitted to the Commonwealth Games Federation to replace Durban. It will be the first international multi-sport event to be held in Birmingham.
