= Hisham Mohd Ashour =

Egyptian squash player (born 1982)

Hisham Ashour
Personal information
- Full name: Hisham Mohamed Ashour
- Born: 29 May 1982 (age 44) Cairo, Egypt
- Height: 1.79 m (5 ft 10 in)
- Weight: 82 kg (181 lb)

Sport
- Country: Egypt
- Handedness: Right Handed
- Turned pro: 2000
- Coached by: Ahmed Matany
- Retired: 2014
- Racquet used: Dunlop

Men's singles
- Highest ranking: No. 11 (February 2012)
- Title: 2
- Tour final: 11
Medal record
Men's squash
Representing Egypt
World Team Championships
Gold medal – first place	2011 Paderborn	Team
- Updated on June 2013

Hisham Mohamed Ashour (born 29 May 1982 in Cairo) is a retired professional squash player who represents Egypt. He is the older brother of Ramy Ashour. He reached a career-high world ranking of World No. 10 in February 2012.
